= 1960 in American television =

This is a list of American television-related events in 1960.

== Events ==
Date	Event	Ref.
February 10	Jack Paar temporarily quit his television program because his monologue had been edited the night before, in favor of a three-minute news update. Parr walked out to the audience at the beginning of the show, announced that he was quitting, said "There's got to be a better way to make a living," and then walked off the stage. After network executives apologized personally, Parr resumed hosting the program a month later. His first show back started with the words "As I was saying before I was interrupted..."	
February 18–28	On an exclusive basis for $60,000, CBS broadcasts coverage of the 1960 Winter Olympics from Squaw Valley, in Placer County, California, making these games the first Winter Olympics to be broadcast in the U.S. Hosted by future CBS Evening News anchor Walter Cronkite, the coverage provided 31 hours of coverage over 11 days, including a healthy mix of alpine skiing, figure skating, ice hockey, speed skating, and ski jumping.	
March 2	Lucille Ball files for divorce from husband Desi Arnaz, ending a 20-year marriage, and the I Love Lucy franchise on CBS. The final installment of The Lucy-Desi Comedy Hour would air almost a month later.	
August 25-September 11	CBS broadcasts the 1960 Summer Olympics from Rome, Italy, hosted by a young Jim McKay, who would later host ABC's coverage of the 1964 Winter Olympics. These were the first Summer Olympics to be broadcast in the U.S. or any country in North America.	
September 24	After thirteen seasons of entertaining American children, the NBC children's show Howdy Doody ends. Clarabell the Clown says the final two words of the show ("Goodbye Kids"), after being assumed to only be mute throughout the show's run.	
September 26	1960 United States presidential debates. American presidential candidates John F. Kennedy and Richard M. Nixon debate live by television. The candidates' behavior and/or appearance during the debate may have altered the outcome of the election. In addition to being the first presidential debates to be televised, the debates also marked the first time "split screen" images were used by a network.	
October 7	Nixon and Kennedy participate in the second presidential debate.	
October 13	Nixon and Kennedy participate in the third presidential debate.	
October 21	The final 1960 presidential debate is held.	
December 31	Norma Zimmer officially becomes Lawrence Welk's "Champagne Lady" on The Lawrence Welk Show.	

=== Also occurring in 1960 ===
- Frank and Doris Hursley start their soap opera writing career, taking the jobs of joint head writers for the series Search for Tomorrow.
- Nearly 90% of homes in the United States now have at least one television set.

== Television programs ==
=== Debuts ===
Date	Debut	Network	Notes
January 1	The Deputy Dawg Show	CBS	
January 9	Home Run Derby	First-run syndication	
January 25	The Kate Smith Show	CBS	
February 7	Overland Trail	NBC	
March 23	Charley Weaver's Hobby Lobby	ABC	
June 8	Happy	NBC	
June 8	Tate	NBC	
June 20	The Bozo Show	WGN-TV	
June 28	The Comedy Spot	CBS	Renamed Comedy Spotlight in 1961
August 1	New Comedy Showcase	CBS	
September 17	Checkmate	CBS	
September 18	The Tab Hunter Show	NBC	
September 23	Dan Raven	NBC	
September 27	The Tom Ewell Show	CBS	
September 29	My Three Sons	ABC	
September 29	Outlaws	NBC	
September 30	The Flintstones	ABC	
October 1	Popeye the Sailor	First-run syndication	
October 1	The Shari Lewis Show	NBC	
October 3	The Andy Griffith Show	CBS	
October 4	Stagecoach West	ABC	
October 5	My Sister Eileen	CBS	
October 7	Route 66	CBS	
October 10	Bringing Up Buddy	CBS	
October 10	Klondike	NBC	
October 11	The Bugs Bunny Show	ABC	
October 12	Peter Loves Mary	NBC	

=== Ending this year ===
Date	Show	Network	Debut	Notes
January 8	Five Fingers	NBC	October 3, 1959	
January 18	Whirlybirds	First-run syndication	February 4, 1957	
January 25	Love and Marriage	NBC	September 21, 1959	
January 27	The Lineup	CBS	October 1, 1954	
February 7	Man with a Camera	ABC	October 10, 1958	
March 22	Bucky and Pepito	First-run syndication	1958	
March 24	Johnny Staccato	NBC	September 10, 1959	
March 26	Philip Marlowe	ABC	October 6, 1959	
April 1	People Are Funny	NBC	September 19, 1954	
April 1	The Lucy-Desi Comedy Hour	CBS	November 6, 1957	
April 1	The Troubleshooters	NBC	September 11, 1959	
April 2	The Ruff and Reddy Show	NBC	December 14, 1957	
April 6	Wichita Town	NBC	September 30, 1959	
May 6	Black Saddle	NBC	January 10, 1959 (on NBC)	
May 9	Colonel Bleep	NBC	September 21, 1957	
May 12	Rescue 8	First-run syndication	September 23, 1958	
May 13	Felix the Cat	First-run syndication	October 2, 1958	
May 18	Playhouse 90	CBS	October 4, 1956	
May 23	Alcoa Theatre	CBS	September 30, 1957	
May 23	Father Knows Best	NBC	October 3, 1954 (on CBS)	
May 23	Goodyear Theatre	NBC	September 30, 1957	
May 31	Startime	NBC	October 6, 1959	
June 2	Tales of the Vikings	First-run syndication	September 8, 1959	
June 3	Hotel de Paree	CBS	October 2, 1959	
June 7	The Millionaire	CBS	January 19, 1955	
June 10	Westinghouse Desilu Playhouse	CBS	June 10, 1960	
June 11	The Man and the Challenge	NBC	September 12, 1959	
June 12	The Alaskans	ABC	October 4, 1959	
June 18	Mr. Lucky	CBS	October 24, 1959	
June 21	M Squad	NBC	September 20, 1957	
June 24	Gillette Cavalcade of Sports	NBC	November 8, 1946	
June 30	Johnny Ringo	CBS	October 1, 1959	
June 30	The Betty Hutton Show	CBS	October 1, 1959	
July 2	Home Run Derby	First-run syndication	January 9, 1960	
July 2	Overland Trail	NBC	February 7, 1960	
July 4	Bourbon Street Beat	ABC	October 5, 1959	
July 8	Tombstone Territory	First-run syndication	October 16, 1957 (on ABC)	
September 6	Richard Diamond, Private Detective	NBC	July 1, 1957 (on CBS)	
September 7	Men Into Space	CBS	September 30, 1959	
September 10	The Dick Clark Show	ABC	February 15, 1958	
September 13	Tightrope!	CBS	September 8, 1959	
September 14	Tate	NBC	June 8, 1960	
September 15	Markham	CBS	May 2, 1959	
September 19	New Comedy Showcase	CBS	August 1, 1960	
September 19	The Texan	CBS	September 29, 1958	
September 22	Law of the Plainsman	NBC	October 1, 1959	
September 22	The Gale Storm Show	ABC	September 29, 1956	
September 23	The Man from Blackhawk	ABC	October 9, 1959	
September 24	Howdy Doody	NBC	December 27, 1947	
September 24	Jubilee USA	ABC	January 22, 1955	
September 27	Colt .45	ABC	October 18, 1957	
December 20	Dick Clark's World of Talent	ABC	September 27, 1959	
Unknown date	This Man Dawson	First-run syndication	1959	
Unknown date	NBC Sunday Showcase	NBC	September 20, 1959	
Unknown date	Clutch Cargo	First-run syndication	March 9, 1959	

== Television stations ==
=== Station launches ===
Date	Market	Station	Channel	Affiliation	Notes/References
January	Lead, South Dakota	KDSJ-TV	11	CBS	Satellite of KOTA-TV (now KHME) in Sioux Falls
January 30	Walla Walla, Washington	KNBS-TV	22	ABC	
February 29	Richardson/Dallas/Fort Worth, Texas	KRET-TV	23	Educational independent	
March 17	Selma/Montgomery, Alabama	WSLA (original)	8	ABC	
May	Aguadilla, Puerto Rico	WOLE-TV	12	Independent	
May 15	Hilo, Hawaii	KHVO	4	ABC	Satellite of KULA in Honolulu
May 23	Athens/Atlanta, Georgia	WGTV	8	NET	Flagship of Georgia Public Broadcasting
June	Weston/Clarksburg, West Virginia	WDTV	5	ABC	Returned to the air after a five-year hiatus after broadcasting on UHF channel 35 as primary ABC/secondary NBC and DuMont affiliate WJPB-TV.
June 12	Mitchell/Sioux Falls, South Dakota	KORN-TV	5	NBC (primary); ABC (secondary)	
June 17	Philadelphia, Pennsylvania	WPCA-TV	17	Independent	
July 31	Sioux Falls, South Dakota	KSOO-TV	13	NBC	
September 14	Dallas, Texas	KERA	13	NET	
September 20	Tallahassee, Florida	WFSU-TV	11	NET	
October 1	Coos Bay, Oregon	KCBY-TV	11	NBC (primary); ABC/CBS (secondary)	
October 5	Mankato, Minnesota	KEYC-TV	12	NBC	
October 10	Toledo, Ohio	WGTE	30	NET	
October 19	Ogden, Utah	KWCS-TV	18	Educational independent	
November 7	Pembina, North Dakota (Winnipeg, Manitoba, Canada)	KCND-TV	12	Independent (primary); ABC/NBC (secondary)	
November 15	Youngstown, Ohio	WXTV	45	Independent	
November 23	Fort Pierce, Florida	WTVI	19	CBS	
December 1	Ogden, Utah	KVOG-TV	9	NTA Film Network	
December 19	Eugene, Oregon	KEZI-TV	9	ABC (primary); CBS (secondary)	
Unknown date	Caguas, Puerto Rico	WKBM-TV	11	Independent	

=== Network affiliation changes ===
Date	Market	Station	Channel	Old affiliation	New affiliation	References
March 17	Montgomery, Alabama	WCOV-TV	20	CBS (primary); ABC (secondary)	CBS (exclusive)	Secondary ABC affiliations were lost when WSLA signed on the air to become a full-time ABC affiliate.
March 17	Montgomery, Alabama	WSFA-TV	12	NBC (primary); ABC (secondary)	NBC (exclusive)	Secondary ABC affiliations were lost when WSLA signed on the air to become a full-time ABC affiliate.
December 19	Eugene, Oregon; Coos Bay, Oregon; Roseburg, Oregon	KVAL-TV; KCBY-TV; KPIC	13; 11; 19	NBC (primary); ABC/CBS (secondary)	NBC (exclusive)	Lost CBS and ABC upon the launch of KEZI
Unknown date	Columbus, Georgia	WRBL	3	CBS (primary); ABC (secondary)	CBS (primary); NBC (secondary)	Switch occurred on same day WRBL moved from channel 4 to 3, and WTVM moved from UHF channel 28 to VHF channel 9.
Unknown date	Columbus, Georgia	WTVM	9	NBC (primary); ABC/NTA (secondary)	ABC (primary); NBC/NTA (secondary)	Switch occurred on same day WRBL moved from channel 4 to 3, and WTVM moved from UHF channel 28 to VHF channel 9.
Unknown date	Hannibal, Missouri (Quincy, Illinois)	KHQA-TV	7	CBS (exclusive)	CBS (primary); ABC (secondary)	
Unknown date	Kalamazoo, Michigan (Grand Rapids/Battle Creek, Michigan)	WKZO-TV	3	CBS (primary); ABC/NBC (secondary)	CBS (primary); ABC (secondary)	WKZO previously cleared NBC programs not picked up by existing NBC affiliate WOOD-TV until WKZO expanded its signal coverage. This allowed WOOD-TV and WKZO-TV to become full-time affiliates of their respective networks, but they both shared ABC until WZZM's 1962 sign-on.
Unknown date	Milwaukee, Wisconsin	WXIX-TV	18	Independent	Independent (primary); ABC/CBS/NBC (secondary)	From 1960 to 1981, WVTV aired network programs rejected by all three of the primary network affiliates in the Milwaukee area. This is not to be confused with today's WXIX-TV in Newport, Kentucky.
Unknown date	Pueblo, Colorado	KRDO-TV	13	NBC	ABC	Became a full-time ABC affiliate after the Pueblo television market merged with that of Colorado Springs.
Unknown date	Richmond, Virginia	WWBT	12	CBS	ABC	
Unknown date	Richmond, Virginia	WTVR-TV	6	ABC	CBS	
Unknown date	Salt Lake City, Utah	KCPX-TV	4	ABC	NBC	
Unknown date	Salt Lake City, Utah	KUTV	2	NBC	ABC	
Unknown date	Tacoma/Seattle, Washington	KTNT-TV	11	Independent	CBS	
Unknown date	San Jose/Salinas/Monterey, California	KNTV	11	Independent	ABC	
Unknown date	San Luis Obispo/Santa Maria/Santa Barbara, California	KSBY-TV	6	NBC (primary); ABC and CBS (secondary)	NBC (primary); CBS (secondary)	
Unknown date	Shreveport, Louisiana	KSLA	12	CBS (primary); ABC (secondary)	CBS (exclusive)	
Unknown date	Shreveport, Louisiana	KTBS-TV	3	NBC (primary); ABC (secondary)	ABC (exclusive)	
Unknown date	Sioux Falls, South Dakota; Florence, South Dakota; Reliance/Pierre, South Dakota	KELO-TV; KDLO-TV; KPLO-TV	11; 3; 6	NBC (primary); ABC (secondary)	CBS (primary); ABC (secondary)	Lost the NBC affiliation upon the sign on of KSOO-TV
Unknown date	Texarkana, Texas/Arkansas; Shreveport, Louisiana	KCMC-TV	6	CBS (primary); ABC (secondary)	CBS (exclusive)	

=== Station closures ===
Date	City of license/Market	Station	Channel	Affiliation	First air date	Notes/Ref.
March 13	Provo, Utah	KLOR-TV	11	Independent	December 17, 1958	
March 21	Sacramento, California	KVUE	40	Independent	November 1, 1959	
March 24	Nampa, Idaho (Boise, Idaho)	KCIX-TV	6	Independent	November 9, 1958	
December 8	Bridgeport, Connecticut	WICC-TV	43	ABC	March 29, 1953	
December 14	Walla Walla, Washington	KNBS-TV	22	ABC	January 30, 1960	

== See also ==
- 1960 in television
- 1960 in film
- 1960 in the United States
- List of American films of 1960
