= KPXJ =

Television station in Minden, Louisiana

ATSC 3.0 station
- Minden–Shreveport, Louisiana; Texarkana, Texas–Arkansas; United States
- City: Minden, Louisiana
- Channels: Digital: 32 (UHF); Virtual: 21
- Branding: KPXJ CW 21 (general); KTBS 3 News on KPXJ CW 21 (newscasts)

Programming
- Affiliations: 21.1: The CW / ABC (alternate); for others, see § Subchannels

Ownership
- Owner: Wray Properties Trust; (KTBS, LLC)
- Sister stations: KTBS-TV

History
- Founded: June 1, 1998
- First air date: August 31, 1998
- Former call signs: WPXO (1998–1999)
- Former channel numbers: Analog: 21 (UHF, 1998–2005); Digital: 21 (UHF, 2005–2019)
- Former affiliations: Pax TV (primary 1998–2003, secondary 2003–2004); UPN (2003–2006); The WB (September 2006, temporary during CW transition)
- Call sign meaning: Pax TV (former affiliation) and J to differentiate from other stations

Technical information
- Licensing authority: FCC
- Facility ID: 81507
- ERP: 1,000 kW
- HAAT: 540 m (1,772 ft)
- Transmitter coordinates: 32°41′8.5″N 93°56′0.6″W

Links
- Public license information: Public file; LMS

KPXJ (channel 21) is a television station licensed to Minden, Louisiana, United States, serving the Shreveport area and the Ark-La-Tex region as an affiliate of The CW. The station is owned by locally based KTBS, LLC, alongside ABC affiliate KTBS-TV (channel 3). The two stations share studios on East Kings Highway on the eastern side of Shreveport; KPXJ's transmitter is located near St. Johns Baptist Church Road (southeast of Mooringsport and Caddo Lake) in rural northern Caddo Parish.

== History ==
=== Early history; as a Pax TV owned-and-operated station ===
The UHF channel 21 allocation was contested between multiple groups that competed for approval by the Federal Communications Commission (FCC) to be the holder of the construction permit to build and license to operate a new television station on the third commercial UHF allocation to be assigned to the Shreveport–Texarkana market (assigned to the Shreveport suburb of Minden, Louisiana). Among the prospective applicants were John E. Powley (who applied for the license on January 16, 1996), Tucson, Arizona–based Northwest Television Inc. (owned by company president William L. Yde III, president, who applied for the license on January 18, 1996) and five parties who each applied for individual applications on April 4 and 5, 1996: Los Angeles–based Venture Technologies Group LLC (majority owned by Lawrence Rogow, who also served as the group's president), Little Rock–based Kaleidoscope Partners (forerunner company to Equity Broadcasting), Washington, D.C.–based WinStar Broadcasting Corp. (owned by Stuart B. Rekant), Wichita, Kansas–based entrepreneur Marcia T. Turner, Columbia, South Carolina–based Universal Media (majority owned by company president Murray Michaels) and Shreveport-based Word of Life Ministries Inc.

On December 19, 1997, West Palm Beach, Florida–based Paxson Communications (now Ion Media Networks)—which was preparing to launch Pax TV, a family-oriented broadcast television network, that tapped Paxson Communications-owned affiliate stations of the Infomall TV Network (inTV), and newly launched and purchased stations to serve as the network's initial affiliates—reached a settlement with the other applicants to acquire the construction permit to operate UHF channel 21, among seven it settled to acquire for an average cost of $4.95 million. On April 14, 1998, The FCC approved the purchase of the channel 21 permit to Paxson and dismissed the applications of the seven competing applicants.

The station first signed on the air on August 31, 1998, as WPXO (in reference to its network affiliation and original corporate parent). Channel 21 originally operated as a charter owned-and-operated station of Pax TV (now general entertainment network Ion Television), which launched on the date of the station's launch. On January 8, 1999, the station changed its call letters to KPXJ; at that time, KTBS, LLC, the Shreveport-based owner of local ABC affiliate KTBS-TV (channel 3), began to operate the station under a joint sales agreement (JSA) with Paxson. (Note: The WPXO-TV call letters were subsequently transferred to a sister station in St. Croix, U.S. Virgin Islands [later WVIF and owned by Corporate Media Consultants Group], which used them from 2000 to 2003; the WPXO calls are currently used by a low-power television station in East Orange, New Jersey.)

=== As a UPN affiliate ===
On June 17, 2003, Paxson Communications announced it would sell KPXJ to KTBS, LLC for $10 million; the FCC rejected the application as agency ownership rules prohibited common ownership of two television stations in a single market if there are fewer than eight independent full-power station owners. As such, Paxson reached an agreement to sell the KPXJ license to Minden Television Company LLC (owned by Lauren Wray Ostendorff, daughter of Edwin N. Wray Jr., part-owner of KTBS), an indirect subsidiary of Wray Properties Trust, for $10 million.

On September 24, 2003, KPXJ took over as the Shreveport-area affiliate of UPN, assuming rights to the network's programming from KSHV-TV (channel 45), which been affiliated with UPN since August 28, 1995 (originally as a primary affiliation until January 2001, before shifting to secondary status to the station's WB affiliation); as a result, KSHV became an exclusive affiliate of The WB. After affiliating with UPN, KPXJ—which, accordingly, changed its branding to "UPN 21"—adopted a general entertainment format typical of UPN stations at the time, initially carrying a mix of first-run syndicated talk, game and court shows, recent off-network sitcoms and drama series, syndicated cartoons and educational children's programs, religious programs, and some sports programming.

Channel 21 continued to carry Pax TV programming on a secondary basis until April 2004; it also continued to air programming from The Worship Network (originally via the Pax TV network feed, then via the direct network feed from 2007 onward) during the overnight hours until early 2010, when Pax successor Ion Television ceased carrying the network as a subchannel service on its owned-and-operated stations. On May 1, 2004, KTBS-TV parent KTBS, LLC re-assumed operational responsibilities for channel 21 under a local marketing agreement with Minden Television.

=== As a CW affiliate ===
On January 24, 2006, the respective parent companies of UPN and The WB, CBS Corporation and the Warner Bros. Entertainment division of Time Warner, announced that they would dissolve the two networks to create The CW Television Network, a joint venture between the two media companies that initially featured programs from its two predecessor networks as well as new series specifically produced for The CW. Subsequently, on February 22, 2006, News Corporation announced the launch of MyNetworkTV, a network operated by Fox Television Stations and sister syndication division Twentieth Television that was created to primarily to provide network programming to UPN and WB stations that The CW decided against affiliating based on their local viewership standing in comparison to the outlet that The CW ultimately chose as its charter outlets, giving these stations another option besides converting to a general entertainment independent format.

On March 7, 2006, in a press release announcement by the network, KPXJ was confirmed as The CW's Shreveport charter affiliate. Since the network chose its charter stations based on which of them among The WB and UPN's respective affiliate bodies was the highest-rated in each market, KPXJ was chosen to join The CW over KSHV-TV as it had been the higher-rated of the two stations at the time of its agreement despite channel 45 having had a four-year headstart on KPXJ operation-wise. Eight days later on March 15, News Corporation announced that it had signed an agreement with White Knight Broadcasting, in which KSHV would become the market's MyNetworkTV affiliate, as part of a deal that also saw Fox-affiliated sister station WNTZ-TV in Alexandria being committed to join the network under a secondary affiliation.

On May 1, KPXJ became one of a few UPN-affiliated stations not owned by Fox Television Stations to remove on-air brand references to the network—rebranding as "KPXJ 21"—and cease promotion of the network's programs. However, it officially remained a UPN affiliate until September 17, 2006, before affiliating with The CW when that network debuted on September 18. KSHV-TV, meanwhile, joined MyNetworkTV upon that network's launch on September 5; unlike in other markets where The WB and UPN both had over-the-air affiliates—where the WB-turned-MyNetworkTV outlet either disaffiliated from The WB entirely or remained a part-time affiliate during the transition—KPXJ assumed temporary rights to the WB affiliation, carrying the final two weeks of that network's programming between midnight and 2 a.m. weeknights and 11 p.m. and 2 a.m. early Mondays until The WB ceased operations on September 17. KPXJ officially affiliated with The CW the following day on September 18, 2006, at which time the station changed its on-air branding to "KPXJ CW 21".

On December 30, 2008, Wray Properties Trust (through KTBS, LLC) filed an application with the FCC to purchase KPXJ from Minden Television for $10.3 million, which would create the market's first (and only) legal television duopoly. As the Shreveport–Texarkana market has only eight full-power television stations, the minimum allowed to create a duopoly under FCC rules, it is the only duopoly legally allowed in the market. KTBS, LLC included in its license transfer request a "failing station waiver", indicating that KPXJ was in an economically non-viable position—noting that the station had lost revenue for the previous three years, and had averaged only a 1 audience share point for all but two sweeps ratings books while never reaching over a 4% share—and that FCC should relax ownership limits that apply to the Shreveport–Texarkana market so that Channel 21 could stay on the air; that limit (found in CFR§73.3555(b)(2) of the FCC's rules) permits ownership duopolies in markets with at least eight full-power stations, whereas Shreveport–Texarkana has only seven. The transfer was completed on August 3 of that year, officially making KTBS-TV and KPXJ directly owned sister stations.

== Programming ==
Occasionally as time permits, KPXJ may air ABC network programs whenever KTBS-TV is unable to in the event of special programming, or extended breaking news or severe weather coverage.

=== Newscasts ===
As of September 2017, KTBS-TV produces 17 hours of locally produced newscasts each week for KPXJ (with three hours each weekday and one hour each on Saturday and Sundays). In addition, KTBS also produces Friday Football Fever, an hour-long highlight program that airs on KPXJ on Friday nights during high school football season. As the duopoly partner of KTBS, the station may also simulcast long-form severe weather coverage from the ABC affiliate in the event that a tornado warning is issued for any county in its Ark-La-Tex viewing area.

==== News programming history ====
In September 2000, in conjunction with the joint sales agreement that Paxson had signed with KTBS-TV, KPXJ began airing tape delayed rebroadcasts of that station's 5 and 10 p.m. newscasts Monday through Fridays at 5:30 and 10:30 p.m. (the latter beginning shortly before that program's live broadcast ended on channel 3). Channel 21 was one of a handful of Pax-owned or -affiliated stations that maintained a news share agreement with an affiliate of a broadcast network other than NBC; most of the agreements forged between Pax TV and local broadcast stations during the early 2000s involved an NBC affiliate, by way of that network holding a minority ownership interest in Pax.

The rebroadcasts were discontinued on September 1, 2003, coinciding with the station's assumption of the UPN affiliation and the transfer of KPXJ to the Wray family's stewardship. On that date, KTBS began producing a half-hour newscast at 9 p.m. for channel 21 (under the title UPN 21 News at 9:00), which was the first locally produced prime time newscast to be offered in the Shreveport–Texarkana market. (On August 3, 2009, the 9 p.m. newscast to a full hour, making it the first hour-long late evening newscast in the market, at which time, it was renamed The KTBS 3 9:00 News Hour.)

On September 12, 2005, KTBS began producing a half-hour weekday morning newscast for KPXJ (titled KPXJ 21 News at 7), predating the debut of a two-hour-long 7 a.m. newscast on Fox affiliate KMSS-TV (channel 33)—that station's first attempt at a local morning newscast, albeit produced by sister station WGMB in Baton Rouge—by two years. (The KPXJ newscast was expanded to one hour in February 2012.) The morning newscast was shifted to 9 a.m. in September 2013, placing it in direct competition with a half-hour newscast in that slot on CBS affiliate KSLA (channel 12).

On August 22, 2016, KTBS began producing an hour-long weekday afternoon newscast at 4 p.m. for KPXJ (titled KTBS 3 News at 4:00 on KPXJ 21), making it the first television station in the market to offer a local newscast to air in that timeslot. (The program would soon gain a competitor when KSLA launched its own hour-long 4 p.m. newscast two weeks later on September 7.)

On August 16, 2021, KPXJ began airing the first 3 p.m. newscast in the market, titled KTBS 3 3:00 News Hour on KPXJ CW21.

== Technical information ==
=== Subchannels ===
Subchannels provided by KPXJ on the KTBS-TV multiplex (ATSC 1.0)
Subchannel	Res.	Short name	Programming	ATSC 1.0 host
21.1	720p	KPXJ-HD	The CW	KTBS-TV
21.2	480i	KPXJ-ME	MeTV	KTBS-TV
21.3	480i	KPXJ-ST	Start TV	KTBS-TV
21.4	480i	KPXJ-AN	Antenna TV	KTBS-TV

Subchannels of KPXJ (ATSC 3.0)
Subchannel	Res.	Short name	Programming
3.1	1080p	KTBS	ABC (KTBS-TV)
3.2	480i	KTBS-WX	KTBS-TV 24-Hour Weather
3.3	480i	KTBS-24	KTBS-TV 24-Hour News
21.1	1080p	KPXJ-HD	The CW

=== Analog-to-digital conversion ===
Because it was granted an original construction permit after the FCC finalized the DTV allotment plan on April 21, 1997, the station did not receive a companion channel for a digital television station. In September 2005, KPXJ discontinued regular programming on its analog signal, over UHF channel 21, and "flash-cut" its digital signal into operation on channel 21. The switchover caused an uproar with viewers that did not have the equipment to receive over-the-air digital broadcasts or subscribed to cable television. Three months later in December 2005, DirecTV added KPXJ to the local stations it made available to the satellite provider's subscribers in the Shreveport–Texarkana market, followed by Dish Network in April 2007.

== See also ==
- Channel 32 digital TV stations in the United States
- Channel 21 virtual TV stations in the United States
