= KNBS (disambiguation) =

KNBS may refer to:

- KNBS, a radio station in Bowling Green, Missouri formerly known as KPVR
- King's Norton Boys' School
- Kenya National Bureau of Statistics
- KNBS (TV), a TV station in Walla Walla, Washington in 1960
