= KSHV =

KSHV may refer to:

- KSHV-TV, a television station (channel 16, virtual 45) licensed to Shreveport, Louisiana, United States
- The ICAO airport code for the Shreveport Regional Airport
- Kaposi's sarcoma-associated herpesvirus (KSHV or HHV-8)
