= Cliff Arquette =

American actor and comedian (1905–1974)

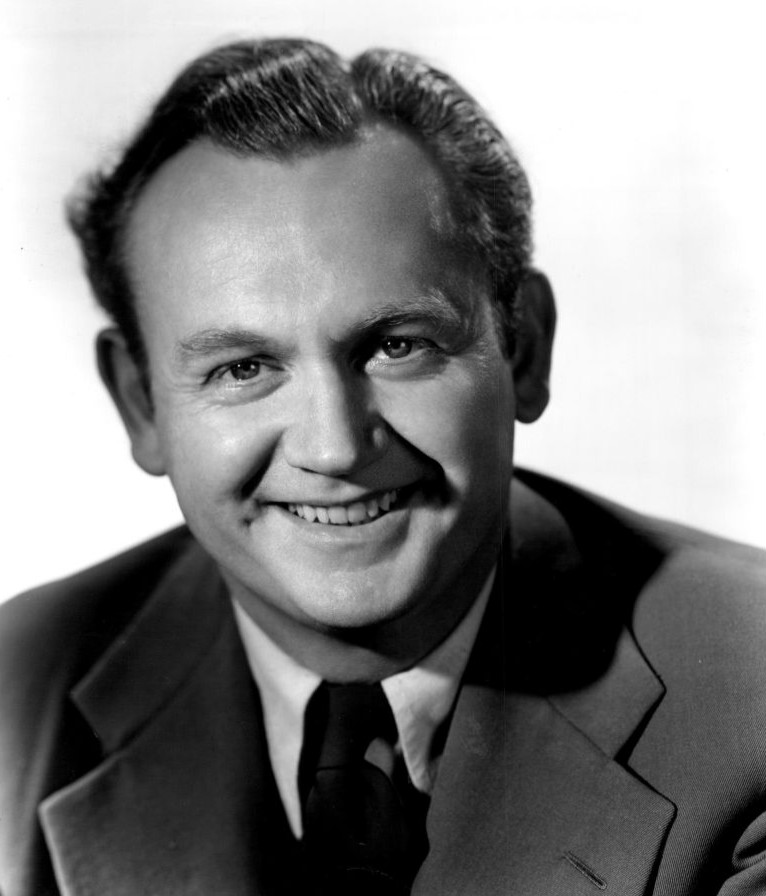
- Arquette in 1941
- Born: Clifford Charles Arquette; December 28, 1905; Toledo, Ohio, U.S.
- Died: September 23, 1974 (aged 68); Burbank, California, U.S.
- Other names: Charley Weaver
- Occupations: Actor, comedian
- Spouse: Mildred LeMay (Speight) (m. 1933; div. 1938)
- Children: Lewis Arquette
- Relatives: Rosanna Arquette (granddaughter); Patricia Arquette (granddaughter); Alexis Arquette (granddaughter); David Arquette (grandson)

Clifford Charles Arquette (/ɑːrˈkɛt/ ar-KET; December 28, 1905 – September 23, 1974) was an American actor and comedian. He was best known for performing comedic routines as his alter-ego Charley Weaver on numerous television and radio shows.

== Early life and career ==
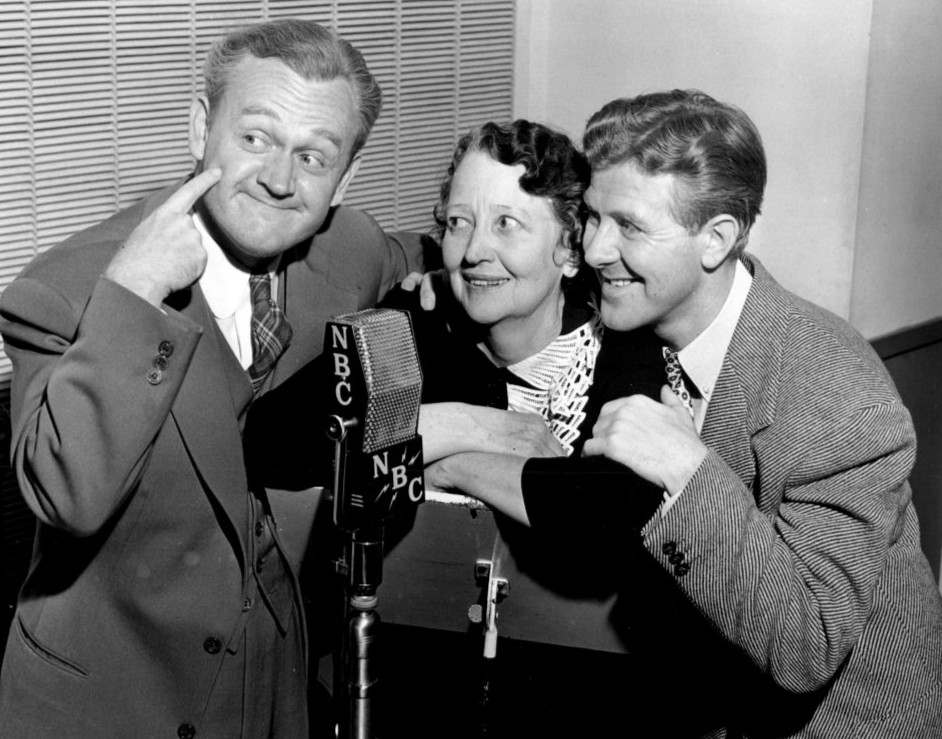
Arquette at left in 1941, during a rehearsal for the radio show Point Sublime

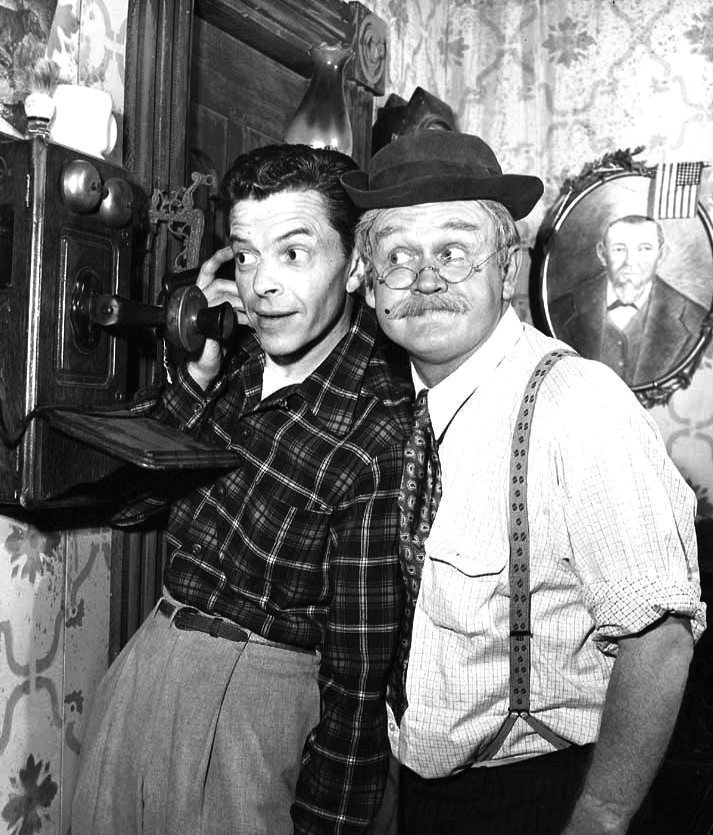
Arquette as Charley Weaver (right) with Dave Willock (left) from the Dave and Charley television program, 1952

Arquette was born on December 28, 1905, in Toledo, Ohio, the youngest of four children born to Winifred Ethel Clark (July 30, 1878 – February 12, 1966) and Charles Augustus Arquette (October 23, 1878 – August 12, 1927), a vaudevillian. His siblings were Naomi "Jane" Arquette Hammett (1899–1934), Russell Arquette (1901–1982), and Lester Kear Arquette (1904–1969). Cliff was of part French-Canadian descent, and his family's surname was originally "Arcouet". The eventual patriarch of the Arquette show business family, Arquette was the father of actor Lewis Arquette with his wife Mildred LeMay (née Speight) and the grandfather of actors Rosanna, Richmond, Patricia, Alexis, and David Arquette.

Arquette is credited for inventing the modern rubber theatrical prosthetic mask, which was flexible enough to allow changing facial expressions, and porous enough to allow air to reach the actor's skin.

Arquette had been a performer in radio, theatre, and motion pictures until 1956, when he retired from show business. At one time, he was credited with performing in 13 different daily radio shows at different stations in the Chicago market, getting from one studio to the other by way of motorboats along the Chicago River through its downtown. One such radio series he performed on was The Adventures of Wild Bill Hickok.

== Charley Weaver ==
Arquette and Dave Willock had their own radio show, Dave and Charley, in the early 1950s, as well as a television show by the same title that was on the air for three months. It was when Arquette performed on the shows that he created and inaugurated his performances as his eventual trademark character of Charley Weaver.

Arquette accepted Jack Paar's invitation to appear on Paar's NBC Tonight Show in 1957. Arquette had previously created the character of "Charley Weaver, the wild old man from Mount Idy.” He would read a letter from his "Mamma" back home. This characterization proved so popular that Arquette almost never again appeared in public as himself, but almost always as Charley Weaver, complete with his squashed hat, little round glasses, rumpled shirt, broad tie, baggy pants, and suspenders. Arquette could often convulse Paar and the audience into helpless laughter by way of his timing and use of double entendres in describing the misadventures of his fictional family and townspeople. As Paar noted, in his foreword to Arquette's first Charley Weaver book:

Sometimes his jokes are old, and I live in the constant fear that the audience will beat him to the punch line, but they never have. And I suspect that if they ever do, he will rewrite the ending on the spot. I would not like to say that all his jokes are old, although some have been found carved in stone. What I want to say is that in a free-for-all ad lib session, Charley Weaver has and will beat the fastest gun alive.

Arquette, as Charley Weaver, hosted Charley Weaver's Hobby Lobby on ABC from September 30, 1959, to March 23, 1960. He also appeared as Charley Weaver on The Roy Rogers and Dale Evans Show in 1962.

In 1960, Arquette was honored with a star on the Hollywood Walk of Fame for his contribution to radio.

== Later career and legacy ==
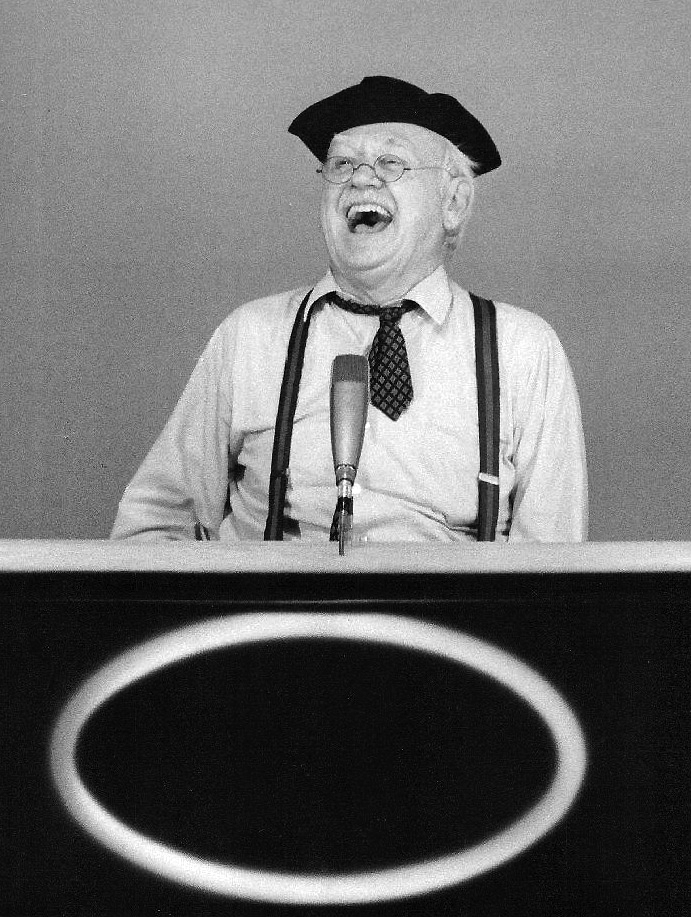
Arquette as Charley Weaver on Hollywood Squares in 1974.

Arquette's Charley Weaver character was a fixture on the TV game show Hollywood Squares for many years, always sitting in the lower left corner of the tic-tac-toe board. As a rule, he was given questions about American History, and as a rule, his answers were correct.

A Civil War buff, Arquette opened the Charley Weaver Museum of the Civil War in Gettysburg, Pennsylvania, in the 1950s. The museum was housed in a building that had served as headquarters for General O.O. Howard during the Battle of Gettysburg, and remained in operation for about ten years. The site later became the Soldier's National Museum, and closed in early November 2014.

Arquette spent some time hospitalized in the early 1970s due to heart disease. He suffered a stroke in 1972 that kept him off of Hollywood Squares for some time.

== Death ==
Arquette died in Burbank, California, following a stroke on September 23, 1974. He was 68 years old.

== Selected bibliography ==
- Charley Weaver's Letters from Mamma (with introduction by Jack Paar; John C. Winston Co., 1959)
- Charley Weaver's Family Album (These Are My People) (John C. Winston Co., 1960)
- Things Are Fine in Mount Idy (Holt, Rinehart and Winston, 1960)

== Discography ==
- Charley Weaver Sings for His People (Music direction by Charles (Puddin' Head) Dant and the Mt. Idy Symphonette, Columbia HF LP, Artist: Charley Weaver, Release date: 1959)
- Let's Play Trains with Cliff Arquette (Edited by H.W. Dunn, Produced by H. Krasne, Sound Effects by Ralph Curtiss and Byron Winett, Columbia HL 9513 (Harmony) LP, Release Date: 1960)
