= KSHV-TV =

Television station in Shreveport, Louisiana

ATSC 3.0 station
- Shreveport, Louisiana; United States
- Channels: Digital: 16 (UHF); Virtual: 45
- Branding: V45

Programming
- Affiliations: 45.1: Independent with MyNetworkTV; for others, see § Subchannels

Ownership
- Owner: Nexstar Media Group; (Nexstar Media Inc.)
- Sister stations: KTAL-TV, KMSS-TV

History
- First air date: April 15, 1994
- Former call signs: KCDN (1989–1991); KWLB (1991–1995); KSHV (1995–2009)
- Former channel numbers: Analog: 45 (UHF, 1994–2009); Digital: 44 (UHF, 2003–2019)
- Former affiliations: Independent (1994–1995); UPN (primary 1995–2001, secondary 2001–2003); The WB (secondary 1996–2001, primary 2001–2006)
- Call sign meaning: Shreveport

Technical information
- Licensing authority: FCC
- Facility ID: 73706
- ERP: 301 kW
- HAAT: 504.9 m (1,656 ft)
- Transmitter coordinates: 32°39′58.5″N 93°56′0.7″W

Links
- Public license information: Public file; LMS
- Website: www.ktalnews.com

KSHV-TV (channel 45) is a television station in Shreveport, Louisiana, United States, serving the Ark-La-Tex region. It is programmed primarily as an independent station, but maintains a secondary affiliation with MyNetworkTV. KSHV-TV is owned by Nexstar Media Group alongside NBC affiliate KTAL-TV (channel 6) and is co-managed with Fox affiliate KMSS-TV (channel 33). The stations share studios on North Market Street and Deer Park Road in northeast Shreveport; KSHV-TV's transmitter is located southeast of Mooringsport.

Channel 45 began broadcasting as KWLB on April 15, 1994. It was built by the Word of Life Center, a Shreveport church, and featured a family-oriented format of religious programs and classic TV shows and movies. The church sold the station the next year to White Knight Broadcasting. The new owners changed the station to a UPN affiliate under the new call sign of KSHV and entered into a local marketing agreement with KMSS-TV. The station added programming from The WB in 1996, became a primary WB affiliate in 2001, and dropped UPN altogether in 2003. The station switched to MyNetworkTV upon the 2006 merger of The WB and UPN into The CW.

Nexstar acquired KMSS-TV's owner, Communications Corporation of America, in 2014. The deal included the sale of KSHV-TV to Marshall Broadcasting Group, though Nexstar continued to provide services as well as a newscast produced by KTAL covering Texarkana-area news. Marshall sold its stations to Mission Broadcasting in 2020, and Nexstar acquired KSHV-TV outright from Mission the next year. KSHV is one of two ATSC 3.0 (NextGen TV) stations in the Shreveport area.

== History ==
=== Construction and Word of Life ownership ===
In 1986, the Federal Communications Commission (FCC) allocated UHF channel 45 to Shreveport, Louisiana. Two parties—businessman Wesley Godfrey and Word of Life Ministries—each had requested the channel be added. Word of Life envisioned a Christian station that offered ministry programming in prime viewing hours. It formally filed for the channel on October 29, 1986. Four other parties applied, and their applications were placed into comparative hearing status in May 1987. Word of Life Ministries reached settlement agreements with Media Communications, Inc., and Shreveport Community Television. On December 9, administrative law judge Joseph Chachkin dismissed the application of Godfrey for failure to prosecute. Even though Word of Life held the permit, there was no visible progress on the station for years. In 1990, Shreveport Community Television sued Word of Life for allegedly reneging on the financial component of their settlement; Word of Life, according to the complaint, had told the firm that station construction had been more expensive than anticipated. At the time, the construction permit held the call sign KCDN.

In 1994, the new station, then designated KWLB, began hiring and leased office space on Interstate Drive. It began broadcasting on April 15, 1994. Programming included religious and children's shows as well as classic TV series and movies. Local programming included a sports talk show, Sports Roundtable, and games of the Shreveport Crawdads of the Continental Basketball Association. In 1995, it aired twelve games of the Shreveport Pirates of the Canadian Football League. Word of Life pastor Sam Carr hosted a daily program with his wife, Becky.

=== As a general-entertainment station ===
After investing $500,000 to start KWLB, Word of Life put the station up for sale in April 1995. It wished to use the funds from the purchase to build a 2,000-seat auditorium at its West Shreveport location. It was sold that month to White Knight Broadcasting, a firm headed by Sheldon Galloway. Sheldon's father, Thomas Galloway, was a principal in Communications Corporation of America (ComCorp), owner of Shreveport Fox affiliate KMSS-TV (channel 33). White Knight's stations held sales agreements with the ComCorp stations in their markets. The $3.8 million earned from the sale went to expanding the sanctuary, a new building on the Word of Life campus, and donations to missions.

Upon the closure of the sale, the station changed call signs to KSHV and became an affiliate of UPN on August 28, 1995; previously, UPN programming aired on a secondary basis on Shreveport CBS affiliate KSLA-TV (channel 12). Religious programming was confined to weekday and Sunday mornings. In July 1996, the station added programming from The WB, with its shows airing on Saturday and Sunday nights. The station continued as a primary UPN, secondary WB affiliate until January 2001, when it flipped to primary WB, secondary UPN and began branding as WB45; WB programming now aired at its regular times and UPN on a two-hour delay. KSHV dropped UPN in September 2003, with KPXJ (channel 21) becoming the new affiliate.

In January 2006, The WB and UPN announced they would merge to form The CW. KPXJ was chosen as the network's new affiliate in March, and White Knight affiliated KSHV and WNTZ-TV serving Alexandria with MyNetworkTV later that month. On February 17, 2009, the station ceased analog broadcasting ahead of the digital television transition.

=== Nexstar operation and ownership ===
On April 24, 2013, Communications Corporation of America announced the sale of its stations to Nexstar Broadcasting Group, which locally owned KTAL-TV (channel 6), for $270 million. Under FCC rules, duopolies were not permissible in a market with fewer than eight full-power TV stations. Instead, Nexstar originally opted to sell KMSS-TV to Mission Broadcasting and KSHV to Rocky Creek Communications, Inc. a company founded by Shirley Green; Nexstar would have operated the stations under a shared services agreement (SSA), bringing them under common operation with KTAL. However, the deal came as the FCC began closely scrutinizing sharing agreements between two or more television stations within the same market. With the ComCorp sale still pending, Nexstar changed tack. It instead sold KMSS-TV and two other stations to a new minority-owned company, Houston-based Marshall Broadcasting Group (founded by Pluria Marshall, Jr.), for $58.5 million. Subsequently, on August 5, Rocky Creek withdrew its application to acquire KSHV. The sale of ComCorp to Nexstar received FCC approval on December 4, 2014.

Marshall Broadcasting Group filed for Chapter 11 bankruptcy protection on December 3, 2019. Marshall also sued Nexstar, alleging that the company sought to "sabotage" his business so that Nexstar could reclaim his stations by way of Mission Broadcasting. Mission agreed to purchase Marshall Broadcasting's stations for $49 million on March 30, 2020. The transaction received FCC approval in August 2020. Nexstar exercised an option to acquire KSHV-TV outright in 2021.

== Newscasts ==
Beginning in 2016, KSHV offered a dedicated newscast from KTAL, Texarkana News First. It covered news in the Texarkana metropolitan area. Airing at 5:30 p.m., presentation moved to KTAL's Texarkana studio when it opened in 2019. Its anchor, Heather Wright, departed the station in 2021.

== Subchannels ==
KSHV-TV's transmitter is located southeast of Mooringsport. Since July 2022, KSHV-TV is one of two ATSC 3.0 (NextGen TV) stations for Shreveport, and its subchannels are carried in ATSC 1.0 format by three other Shreveport TV stations:

Subchannels provided by KSHV-TV (ATSC 1.0)
Subchannel	Res.	Short name	Programming	ATSC 1.0 host
45.1	720p	KSHV-DT	Main KSHV-TV programming	KMSS-TV
45.2	480i	Escape	Ion Mystery (4:3)	KTAL-TV
45.3	480i	ION	Ion (4:3)	KTAL-TV
45.4	480i	Quest	Quest	KSLA

Subchannels of KSHV-TV (ATSC 3.0)
Subchannel	Res.	Short name	Programming
6.1	1080p	KTALDT	NBC (KTAL-TV)
12.1	1080p	KSLA DT	CBS (KSLA)
33.1	720p	KMSS-HD	Fox (KMSS-TV)
45.1	720p	KSHV-HD	Main KSHV-TV programming

Subchannel broadcast with digital rights management
