= KTAL TV Tower =

Coordinates: 32°54′11″N 94°00′21″W

KTAL TV-FM Tower (also called Nexstar Broadcasting Tower Vivian) is a 1,558-foot-tall (475 m), 1,480 feet (450 m) without appurtenances, tall guyed mast used for TV transmission by KTAL-TV. It is located at the Old Atlanta Highway near Vivian, Louisiana, US at 32° 54'11.0" N and 94° 00'21.0" W.

At its completion in 1961, the tower was the tallest structure of Louisiana and the fourth tallest in the world. In addition to broadcasting KTAL-TV, the tower also holds the transmission equipment for KTAL-FM (98 Rocks). Both stations are licensed to Texarkana, Texas, and at the time of the tower's construction were owned by Clyde E. Palmer, also owner of the Texarkana Gazette. Palmer's media holdings later became known as WEHCO Media, which eventually divested the stations to separate owners—the TV station to Nexstar Broadcasting Group and the radio station to Access.1 Louisiana Holding Company.

== See also ==
- List of masts
