= KMSS-TV =

Television station in Shreveport, Louisiana

- Shreveport, Louisiana; Texarkana, Texas–Arkansas; United States
- City: Shreveport, Louisiana
- Channels: Digital: 34 (UHF); Virtual: 33
- Branding: KMSS Fox 33; Fox 33 News

Programming
- Affiliations: 33.1: Fox; 33.2: Rewind TV

Ownership
- Owner: Mission Broadcasting, Inc.
- Operator: Nexstar Media Group via SSA
- Sister stations: KTAL-TV, KSHV-TV

History
- First air date: April 11, 1985
- Former channel number: Analog: 33 (UHF, 1985–2009)
- Former affiliations: Independent (1985–1986); CBS (secondary, 1985–1991)
- Call sign meaning: Media South of Shreveport, Inc. (original owner)

Technical information
- Licensing authority: FCC
- Facility ID: 12525
- ERP: 1,000 kW
- HAAT: 551 m (1,808 ft)
- Transmitter coordinates: 32°39′58″N 93°55′59″W

Links
- Public license information: Public file; LMS
- Website: www.ktalnews.com

KMSS-TV (channel 33) is a television station in Shreveport, Louisiana, United States, serving as the Fox affiliate for the Ark-La-Tex region. It is owned by Mission Broadcasting and operated by Nexstar Media Group under a shared services agreement (SSA), making it sister to KTAL-TV (channel 6), an NBC affiliate, and KSHV-TV (channel 45), an independent station with MyNetworkTV. The three stations share studios on North Market Street and Deer Park Road in northeast Shreveport; KMSS-TV's transmitter is located southeast of Mooringsport.

== History ==
=== Early history ===
The UHF channel 33 allocation was contested between seven groups that competed for approval by the Federal Communications Commission (FCC) to be the holder of the construction permit to build and license to operate a new television station on the first commercial UHF allocation to be assigned to Shreveport. The initial application to broadcast over the frequency was filed on June 12, 1982, when Poughkeepsie, New York–based Great Central Communications (owned by brothers and radio station owners Saul Dresner and Alfred Dresner, in partnership with minority owner Milton Aninger) applied with the FCC to obtain the construction permit and license. Washington, D.C.–based Media South Broadcasting Corp. (a subsidiary of Multi Media Communications and owned by Raymond A. Goudreau, Martin E. Firestone and John A. Fergie) filed a separate license application for channel 33 three weeks later on July 6.

Five additional prospective applicants filed for the channel 33 permit on September 9: Minden-based Drew & Kemmerly (a five-person partnership led by majority owners Jean T. Drew and David Kemmerly, who were the only applicants seeking to license the allocation to nearby Bossier City), Shreveport-based Godfrey & Associates (a family-led group owned by Glynn Godfrey, Patricia Godfrey and Kirk Godfrey, whose brother, Wesley Godfrey, was minority owner of radio station KDKS-FM [102.1, now licensed to nearby Blanchard] in Benton), Pacoima, California–based Seattle Community TV Network Inc. (owned by Rosa Ware and Titilola Payne), Cleveland, Tennessee–based Shreveport Metro Communications 33 Ltd. (owned by Farrell B. Jones and Evelyn S. Lane), and Atlanta-based Shreveport TV Co. (owned by James H. Thornton and Ramon Diaz).

On December 7, 1984, administrative law judge Byron E. Harrison—who oversaw the dispute over the UHF channel 33 construction permit—granted a motion for resolving disqualifying issues levied against Media South Communications as well as a joint settlement agreement request and applications dismissals by Shreveport Metro Communications 33 Ltd, Godfrey & Associates, and Shreveport Television Co. with prejudice. The decision also granted a merger between Great Southern TV Broadcasting (owned by Joseph D. Waggoner and Grey Teekell, whose separate application as existed prior to the merger was dismissed with prejudice) and Media South Broadcasting, whose amended application for channel 33 was given approval. In February 1985, Media South requested and received approval to assign KMSS-TV (in reference to the licensee, Media South of Shreveport, Inc.) as the call letters for its television station.

Channel 33 first signed on the air on April 11, 1985. It was the fifth commercial television station in the Shreveport–Texarkana market (as well as the first to sign on in the market since ABC affiliate KTBS-TV (channel 3) debuted thirty years earlier on September 3, 1955), and the second UHF station to have signed on in the market (after PBS member station and Louisiana Public Broadcasting satellite KLTS-TV [channel 24], which debuted six years prior on August 9, 1978). The station originally operated from studio and office facilities located at 3519 Jewella Avenue (between Claiborne Avenue and Ninock Street) in southwestern Shreveport. Originally broadcasting daily from 6 a.m. until 3 a.m., KMSS-TV—which was also the first independent station to sign on in the market—initially maintained a programming format consisting of a mix of recent and classic sitcoms, westerns and drama series, cartoons, religious programs and some older movies. Channel 33 also aired CBS programs that KSLA-TV (channel 12) declined to air, mostly the network's late night and morning lineup (with the exception of The Price Is Right and The Young and the Restless) and most of its Saturday morning children's programming. From its sign-on, KMSS was the first television station in the state of Louisiana to broadcast in stereo.

=== Fox affiliation; ComCorp ownership and JSA/SSA with KSHV-TV ===
In the summer of 1986, News Corporation approached Media South about turning KMSS into a charter affiliate of the Fox Broadcasting Company. Channel 33 joined Fox when the network inaugurated programming on October 9, 1986. Though it was technically a network affiliate, KMSS continued to be programmed as a de facto independent station as Fox's initial programming lineup consisted solely of a late-night talk show, The Late Show Starring Joan Rivers. Even after its programming expanded with the launch of a three-hour Sunday night lineup in April 1987, Fox aired its prime time programming exclusively on weekends until September 1989, when it began a five-year expansion towards a nightly prime time schedule. Until Fox began airing prime time programs on all seven nights of the week in January 1993, KMSS continued to air a movie at 7 p.m. on nights when the network did not offer any programming. (It is one of two television stations in the market, alongside KSLA, that has retained the same network affiliation, and the only station not to be affiliated with any other network.)

KMSS logo, used from 2001 to 2008.

KMSS logo, used from 2008 to 2015.

For its first four years as a Fox affiliate, KMSS-TV—which, in compliance with Fox's stricter branding requirements, began identifying as "KMSS Fox 33" in on-air verbiage in 1989 and within its logo in 1991—served as a default Fox station for the Tyler–Longview market. This status continued until April 1, 1991, when the Tyler-Longview market gained over-the-air access to Fox programming when present-day sister station, KLMG-TV—which concurrently changed its call letters to KFXK-TV—disaffiliated from CBS and switched to Fox (CBS would not regain an affiliate in the Tyler/Longview market until 2004, when KYTX switched its affiliation from NBC—through its previous status as a semi-satellite of Longview-based affiliate KETK-TV—to CBS). On May 1, 1987, Media South announced it would sell KMSS-TV to Austin, Texas-based Southwest Multimedia Corp. (owned by Billy Goldberg and Lester Kamin) for $7 million; the sale received FCC approval on June 24.

After Fox began offering programming on a nightly basis (with the addition of programming on Tuesday and Wednesday evenings) in January 1993, KMSS became less reliant on movies during the period, due to the growing cable television industry impacting the ability of broadcast stations to acquire film content; channel 33 relegated its movie presentations to weekend afternoons (except on days when Fox offered sports programming) and late nights. It would also rely on the network's Fox Kids block for its children's programming inventory, resulting in many syndicated children's programs that KMSS had aired to occupy portions of the weekday daytime and Saturday morning time periods being relegated to early morning time slots as well as around the morning and afternoon network blocks.

On April 15, 1993, Southwest Multimedia (under debtor-in-possession entity SWMM-Shreveport Corp.) filed an FCC application seeking to transfer 525 shares in KMSS-TV common stock to Arthur Lanham and Mitchell A. Levy at $1 per share, which would expand Lanham and Levy's interest to encompass 1,050 shares (of 52%) in station common stock; the application was dismissed on June 4. In September 1993, KMSS-TV began maintaining a secondary affiliation with the Prime Time Entertainment Network (PTEN), an ad hoc syndicated programming venture between Chris-Craft Television and Warner Bros. Domestic Television; because its Fox programming commitments precluded PTEN programming (which consisted of mainly first-run drama series) from airing during prime time, KMSS carried the latter's offerings in late night until the programming service ceased operations in September 1997.

On March 21, 1994, Southwest Multimedia announced it would sell KMSS-TV to Lafayette-based Associated Broadcasters Inc. (later renamed Communications Corporation of America, and founded by Thomas R. Galloway and D. Wayne Elmore) for $1.5 million; the sale received FCC approval on October 3, 1994. On June 1, 1995, White Knight Broadcasting—an arm of Associated Broadcasters/ComCorp (owned by media executive Sheldon Galloway), which purchased the station from Word of Life Ministries for $3.8 million that April—entered into a local marketing agreement to operate upstart independent station KWLB (channel 45), which subsequently changed its call letters to KSHV-TV on July 26, under which Associated Broadcasters/KMSS would provide programming, advertising and other administrative services for KSHV. Channel 45 subsequently migrated its operations from the Word of Life Center on West 70th Street/Meriwether Road (near LA 3132) in southwestern Shreveport into KMSS's Jewella Avenue studios. During the early- and mid-2000s, KMSS lessened its reliance on running cartoons and classic sitcoms, and began acquiring more talk shows, reality series and court shows, although more recent sitcoms remained as part of its schedule (including as part of its early evening and late prime time lineups surrounding the Fox nighttime schedule).

==== Virtual triopoly with KTAL-TV ====
On April 24, 2013, Irving, Texas–based Nexstar Broadcasting Group announced that it would acquire the nineteen television stations owned by Communications Corporation of America and White Knight Broadcasting, including KMSS and its time brokerage agreement with KSHV-TV, for $270 million in cash and stock. Because Nexstar could not legally purchase KMSS under FCC ownership rules as Shreveport has only eight full-power stations (the FCC requires a market to have at least eight unique owners once a duopoly is formed), and KTAL and KMSS were among the four highest-rated stations in the Shreveport market at the time of the transaction, plans called for KMSS to be acquired by Westlake, Ohio–based Nexstar partner company Mission Broadcasting for $27 million, while KSHV was to be sold to a female-controlled company, Denton, Texas–based Rocky Creek Communications (owned by Shirley Green), for $2.1 million. Nexstar planned to operate KMSS and KSHV under a shared services agreement, forming a virtual triopoly with KTAL.

However, on June 6, 2014, Nexstar announced that it would instead sell KMSS-TV, along with two other Fox affiliates—sister station KPEJ-TV in Midland, Texas and KLJB in Davenport, Iowa—to Houston-based Marshall Broadcasting Group (founded by Pluria Marshall, Jr.) for $58.5 million, an agreement that marked the company's first television station acquisitions. The minority-owned Marshall intended to fund the acquisitions—which were subject to FCC approval of Nexstar's acquisition of the ComCorp and White Knight Broadcasting stations as well as its concurring purchase of Grant Broadcasting—through borrowings guaranteed by Nexstar; Marshall planned to launch news operations and provide sports and minority-oriented public affairs programming on KMSS and the other two stations (opting instead to have Nexstar-owned stations produce additional newscasts for the Marshall stations in each of the three markets), with Nexstar providing sales and certain non-programming services including engineering, master control and other administrative functions.

The sale of ComCorp to Nexstar, as well as that of KMSS to Marshall and a concurring acquisition of the time brokerage agreement with KSHV, received FCC approval on December 4, 2014, and was completed on January 1, 2015. As a result, Nexstar began operating KMSS and KSHV under separate shared services agreements with Marshall and White Knight, forming a virtual triopoly with KTAL, leaving Shreveport's six major commercial stations under the control of just three broadcasting companies (the Wray family—through Wray Properties Trust—owns KTBS, while KSLA is owned by Gray Television); KMSS and KSHV subsequently migrated their operations into KTAL's North Market Street studios in northeastern Shreveport.

On April 3, 2019, Marshall filed a lawsuit against Nexstar in the New York Supreme Court, accusing it of sabotaging the value of KMSS, KPEJ and KLJB for future direct acquisition under a waiver of duopoly rules (which allow groups to seek approval for duopolies involving two of a given market's four highest-rated stations), being undermined in favor of Nexstar under the terms of Marshall's financing deal with that group (which Nexstar is alleged to have threatened to withdraw), being given a $16-million overevaluation of the collective worth of the stations, and withholding retransmission fees. (Prior to the 2014 deal with Nexstar, Pluria Marshall Jr.—who is African American—had struggled to obtain financing for station purchases dating to the late 1980s, including a rebuffed 2008 offer to buy stations from Media General, which Nexstar would eventually acquire in 2017.) Nexstar issued a statement calling the allegations "spurious and without merit.”

On December 3, 2019, Marshall Broadcasting Group filed for Chapter 11 bankruptcy protection. Mission Broadcasting, another company associated with Nexstar Media Group, agreed to purchase Marshall Broadcasting's stations for $49 million on March 30, 2020. The transaction was completed on September 1, 2020.

== Programming ==
=== Sports programming ===
In its early years, KMSS was the local over-the-air broadcaster of Major League Baseball games from both the Texas Rangers and the Houston Astros, and broadcast games from the now-defunct Shreveport Captains minor league baseball team. It also formerly broadcast Big 12 Conference football games after that conference formed in the mid-1990s, and until the launch of the cable SEC Network in August 2014, carried with KSHV Southeastern Conference football and basketball games.

=== News operation ===
As of September 2017, KTAL-TV produces 17 hours of locally produced newscasts each week for KMSS-TV (with three hours on weekdays, and one hour each on Saturday and Sundays). As the SSA partner of KTAL, the station may also simulcast long-form severe weather coverage from the NBC affiliate in the event that a tornado warning is issued for any county (or parish in Louisiana) in its Ark-La-Tex viewing area.

==== News programming history ====
For most of its history, KMSS-TV was one of several Fox-affiliated stations throughout the United States that did not have a local newscast; in lieu of a regular news program, starting in 1991, KMSS ran daily local weather inserts during regular programming that were produced by WeatherVision, a Jackson, Mississippi-based company formed by meteorologist Edward St. Pe to provide weather forecasts for stations without a news department; the agreement with WeatherVision was discontinued in December 2006.

On April 23, 2007, KMSS debuted a half-hour prime time newscast at 9 p.m. each weeknight. Titled Fox News Louisiana, the program was produced in partnership with Fox-affiliated sister station WGMB in Baton Rouge, which served as a hub for local newscasts seen on ComCorp's Louisiana-based stations and one of two news production hubs for the company as a whole. Similar to other outsourced newscasts by its sister Fox stations in Texas and Louisiana under Comcorp ownership, the program—which had its in-studio segments taped earlier in the evening—featured stories filed by reporters based in the Shreveport–Texarkana area, with a local forecast segment compiled and presented by WGMB's evening meteorologist Nelson Robinson. The news anchor and meteorologist were provided by the centralized production hub and other WGMB personnel filled-in as necessary. The original format of the broadcast consisted of local news headlines and a local forecast geared specifically towards the program's Ark-La-Tex audience during the first 20 minutes, with the final two segments of the program consisting of a direct partial simulcast of WGMB's live 9 p.m. newscast, which included a national and international news summary from Jeff Beimfohr, along with a statewide sportscast anchored by Chris Mycoskie. By the fall of 2008, the KMSS newscast's format was altered to have the entire broadcast be pre-recorded.

On August 20, 2007, about five months after the 9 p.m. newscast debuted, KMSS debuted a two-hour-long weekday morning newscast, titled Fox News Louisiana AM. Like the evening newscast, certain segments were pre-recorded and incorporated stories filed by the Shreveport-based reporting staff, while other segments were broadcast live. While production of the evening program was turned over to NBC-affiliated sister station KETK-TV in Tyler, Texas—the other news production hub maintained by ComCorp—in February 2008, WGMB continued to hold production responsibilities for the morning newscast. Fox News Louisiana AM was canceled in December 2008. (KMSS filling part of its former time slot with Montel, which previously aired on sister station KSHV-TV.)

The original half-hour incarnation of the 9 p.m. newscast was discontinued on September 5, 2008. Three days later on September 8, it was replaced by a 10-minute-long news program, Fox News Ark-La-Tex, which was also produced by KETK. Much like the original half-hour 9 p.m. newscast, it was recorded earlier in the evening and featured stories filed by Shreveport-based reporters, although meteorologists and sports anchors employed with KETK provided and prepared local forecast and sports segments out of that station's Tyler studios. On September 20, 2010, the program was expanded to a half-hour and was retitled to Fox [33] News Ark-La-Tex.

As a result of the sale to Marshall Broadcasting and the formation of the resulting SSA with the NBC affiliate, on February 2, 2015, KTAL-TV took over production responsibilities for KMSS's 9 p.m. newscast, relocating production to KTAL's Market Street studios in northeast Shreveport and utilizing channel 6's existing news department staff. On that date, the prime time newscast was retitled Fox 33 News: First at 9 and was converted into a live, seven-night-a-week broadcast. (The station expanded the weeknight editions of the program to one hour on July 28, 2015.) Subsequently, on August 3, KTAL began producing a one-hour-long weekday morning newscast at 7 a.m., titled Fox 33 News: Good Day, which replaced paid programming in that time period and restored a morning newscast to its schedule after an eight-year absence. (The morning newscast would expand to two hours on November 7, 2016.)

== Technical information ==
=== Subchannels ===
The station's signal is multiplexed:

Subchannels of KMSS-TV
Subchannel	Res.	Short name	Programming
33.1	720p	KMSS-HD	Fox
33.2	480i	Rewind	Rewind TV
45.1	720p	MyNet	MyNetworkTV (KSHV-TV)

Broadcast on behalf of another station

=== Analog-to-digital conversion ===
KMSS-TV ended regular programming on its analog signal, over UHF channel 33, on June 12, 2009, the official date on which full-power television stations in the United States transitioned from analog to digital broadcasts under federal mandate. The station's digital signal remained on its pre-transition UHF channel 34, using virtual channel 33.
