= KTBS-TV =

Television station in Shreveport, Louisiana

- Shreveport, Louisiana; Texarkana, Texas–Arkansas; United States
- City: Shreveport, Louisiana
- Channels: Digital: 28 (UHF); Virtual: 3
- Branding: KTBS 3 (general); KTBS 3 News (newscasts)

Programming
- Affiliations: 3.1: ABC; for others, see § Subchannels

Ownership
- Owner: Wray Properties Trust; (KTBS, LLC)
- Sister stations: KPXJ

History
- First air date: September 3, 1955
- Former channel numbers: Analog: 3 (VHF, 1955–2009)
- Former affiliations: NBC (1955–1961); ABC (secondary, 1955–1961)
- Call sign meaning: Tri-State Broadcasting System; -or-; Texarkana, Bossier City, Shreveport

Technical information
- Licensing authority: FCC
- Facility ID: 35652
- ERP: 1,000 kW
- HAAT: 563 m (1,847 ft)
- Transmitter coordinates: 32°41′8.5″N 93°56′0.6″W

Links
- Public license information: Public file; LMS
- Website: www.ktbs.com

KTBS-TV (channel 3) is a television station in Shreveport, Louisiana, United States, serving as the ABC affiliate for the Ark-La-Tex region. The station is owned by the locally based KTBS, LLC (owned by the Wray Properties Trust, which is managed by Betty Wray Anderson, John D. Wray, and Edwin N. Wray, Jr.), alongside CW affiliate KPXJ (channel 21). The two stations share studios on East Kings Highway on the eastern side of Shreveport; KTBS-TV's transmitter is located near St. Johns Baptist Church Road (southeast of Mooringsport and Caddo Lake) in rural northern Caddo Parish. Currently, KTBS-TV is one of a handful of American television stations to have locally based ownership.

== History ==
=== Early history; as a primary NBC/secondary ABC affiliate ===
The VHF channel 3 allocation was contested between three groups that competed for approval by the FCC to be the holder of the construction permit to build and license to operate a new television station on the first commercial VHF allocation to be assigned to Shreveport. On June 27, 1952, one week before the FCC released a Report and Order reallocation memorandum that lifted a four-year moratorium on new television broadcast license applications, Shreveport-based KTBS Inc. (a family-led group owned by George D. Wray Sr., Edwin N. Wray Sr., George D. Wray Jr., Charles W. Wray and John A. Hendrick) filed the initial application for the permit. Another Shreveport-based company, International Broadcasting Corp. (a consortium that owned local radio station KWKH [1130 AM and 94.5 FM; the latter is now KRUF] and was managed by William H. Bronson, Robert Ewing Jr., Wilson Ewing, Henry R. Clay and Toulmin Brown, the latter of whom was an assistant secretary principal to Shreveport Times parent Times Publishing Co.), filed its own application for the permit on July 3.

A wrench in International Broadcasting's application was a concurring proposed merger between Shreveport's two major daily newspapers, the Shreveport Times and the Shreveport Journal. On December 4, 1953, the FCC Broadcast Bureau reversed a hearing examiner's decision and approved KTBS Inc.'s request to subpoena International Broadcasting/KWKH for a "merger" agreement between the Times and the Journal, contending that the testimony of KWKH president William H. Bronson in respect to the agreement alone was insufficient and that the agreement be submitted for review in judging the KWKH application. KTBS Inc. respesentatives contended the agreement was relevant "because the [Times Publishing Company and the Journal Publishing Company, the newspapers' respective owners] publish the only major newspapers in Shreveport" and because Times Publishing would be the business agent for both newspapers and exert control of KWKH. On June 16, 1954, FCC Hearing Examiner Basil Cooper issued an initial decision looking to grant the construction permit application for channel 3 to KTBS Inc. The FCC Broadcast Bureau granted exclusive rights to the permit to Shreveport Television Company on February 16, 1955, formally denying KRMD and Southland Television's respective bids, finding that KTBS Inc. was a more qualified permittee due to its local ownership, integration of ownership and management, and had more extensive participation by its ownership in local affairs.

The KWKH application was denied due to critical deficiencies under FCC's diversification of media of communications policy, citing its ownership of two clear channel radio stations (KWKH-AM and KTHS [now KAAY] in Little Rock, Arkansas) and its parent's ownership of three newspapers (the Times, and the Monroe Morning World and The News-Star in Monroe) in neighboring states would produce a concentration of broadcast and newspaper facilities by a single company, but noted that the Times's joint printing agreement with the Shreveport Journal produced "no disservice to the public interest" due to the lack of a forced combination in print advertising. (A petition by KWKH to reconsider the grant of the channel 3 permit to KTBS Inc. was denied in May 1955, with the FCC admonishing KWKH for "repetitious[...], reckless and unsupported" charges in its petition that a KTBS principal witness committed perjury, and its "assertions and insinuations" that the agency did not give "fair, impartial" consideration to the evidence submitted; a subsequent appeal by International Broadcasting/KWKH seeking to overturn the grant, was denied by the U.S. District Court for the Western District of Louisiana in March 1956.) The Wray-led group subsequently requested and received approval to assign KTBS-TV as the television station's call letters; the base KTBS callsign—standing for "Tri-State Broadcasting System," the moniker that the Wrays used for the other radio stations they owned in Louisiana, Texas and Arkansas—had been used by the Wray-owned namesake radio station on 710 AM (now KEEL) since 1929, and applied to its FM sister on 96.5 (now KVKI-FM) upon its sign-on in 1953. (Note: The calls can also be taken to reference the three cities in its service area, "Texarkana, Bossier, Shreveport".)

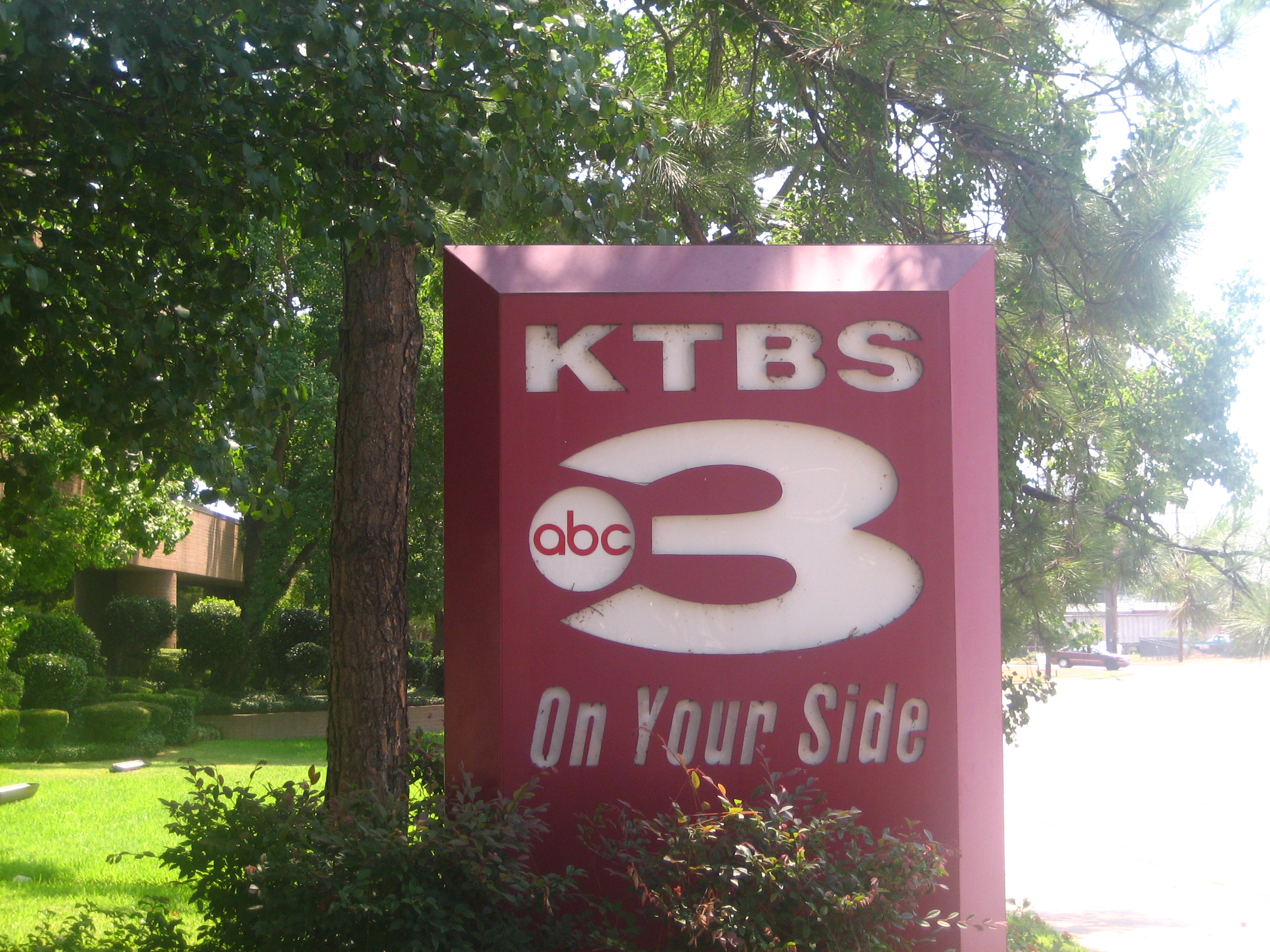
A plaque with the 1996–2005 version of the station logo, outside the KTBS studios on East Kings Highway; that marker has since been remodeled to include the current KTBS-TV and KPXJ logos.

KTBS-TV first signed on the air on September 3, 1955; it was the third television station to sign on in the present day Shreveport–Texarkana market and the second to be licensed to Shreveport, after Shreveport-based KSLA (channel 12), which signed on the air on January 1, 1954; and Texarkana, Texas-licensed KCMC-TV (channel 6, now KTAL-TV), which debuted on August 16, 1953. The station originally operated as a primary NBC affiliate, owing to KTBS radio's longtime relationship with the progenitor NBC Red Network. It also maintained a secondary affiliation with ABC, the rights to which it shared with KSLA-TV, which had carried a secondary affiliation with that network since it signed on. The station has maintained studio facilities located at 312 East Kings Highway since its inception, sharing its facility with KTBS radio. The radio stations were sold off in the late 1950s, but the Wrays (who are also the owners of a car dealership franchise in Shreveport) have retained channel 3 to this day.

=== As a full-time ABC affiliate ===
In March 1961, NBC reached an agreement with KCMC-TV to become the network's primary affiliate for the enlarged Shreveport–Texarkana market. KCMC owner Camden News Publishing Co.—which, in 1960, received permission to move the station's transmitter to a site 2.3 miles (3.7 km) south-southwest of Vivian, in a move that would consolidate Shreveport and Texarkana into a single television market—was in the process of expanding its service area to encompass and its primary operations to serve the Shreveport area. KTBS's contract with NBC was not scheduled to expire until September 1962, though, with the planned relocation of KCMC to cover Shreveport, there had been speculation that KTBS and KTAL would swap primary affiliations before the contract was set to expire. On September 3, 1961, KTAL took over as the exclusive NBC affiliate for the Shreveport–Texarkana market; KTBS-TV concurrently became the market's exclusive ABC affiliate as well as the second full-time ABC affiliate in the state of Louisiana (after WVUE-TV [now a Fox affiliate] in New Orleans, which became a full-time ABC station in 1957). Over the years, KTBS has become one of the strongest ABC affiliates in the country. In an era where most broadcast television stations have become owned by larger chain broadcasting companies due to increased ownership consolidation in the broadcast television industry, KTBS is one of the few major network affiliates in the U.S. that has remained under local ownership. It became the first of the local "Big Three" affiliates in Shreveport and the second television station in the market to launch stereo broadcasting, doing so in May 1987.

In January 1999, KTBS, LLC assumed partial operational responsibilities for Pax TV owned-and-operated station KPXJ (channel 21) under a joint sales agreement (JSA) with its owner at the time, Paxson Communications (now Ion Media Networks). Under the terms of the agreement, which was modeled similarly to other outsourcing agreements between Paxson and an owner of a local major network affiliate during that timeframe, KTBS also rebroadcast its 5 and 10 p.m. newscasts on channel 21. On June 17, 2003, Paxson announced it would sell KPXJ to KTBS, LLC for $10 million; the FCC rejected the application as agency ownership rules prohibited common ownership of two television stations in a single market if there are fewer than eight independent full-power station owners. As such, Paxson reached an agreement to sell the KPXJ license to Minden Television Company LLC (owned by Lauren Wray Ostendorff, daughter of Edwin N. Wray Jr., part-owner of KTBS), an indirect subsidiary of Wray Properties Trust, for $10 million. After the purchase was finalized, the Wrays converted KPXJ into the market's UPN affiliate.

Logo until 2020.

On December 30, 2008, KTBS, LLC (by way of Wray Properties Trust) filed an application with the FCC to purchase KPXJ from Minden Television for $10.3 million, which would create the market's first legal television duopoly. As the Shreveport–Texarkana market has only eight full-power television stations (the minimum required to create a duopoly under FCC rules), it is the first duopoly legally allowed in the market. KTBS, LLC included in its license transfer request a "failing station waiver", indicating that KPXJ was in an economically non-viable position—noting that the station had lost revenue for the previous three years, and had averaged only a 1 audience share point for all but two sweeps ratings books while never reaching over a 4% share—and that FCC should relax ownership limits that apply to the Shreveport–Texarkana market so that Channel 21 could stay on the air; that limit (found in CFR§73.3555(b)(2) of the FCC's rules) permits ownership duopolies in markets with at least eight full-power stations, whereas Shreveport–Texarkana has only seven. The transfer was completed on August 3 of that year, officially making KTBS-TV and KPXJ directly owned sister stations.

== Programming ==
KTBS-TV currently broadcasts the complete ABC network schedule (it did not begin clearing the entire network lineup until April 2018, when it reduced its Sunday 5 p.m. newscast to a half-hour in order to start carrying the Sunday edition of ABC World News Tonight, which had been preempted by KTBS since the mid-1990s).

The station may preempt some ABC programs in order to air long-form breaking news or severe weather coverage, or occasional specials produced by KTBS' news department. ABC shows preempted or otherwise interrupted by such content may either be rebroadcast on tape delay over KTBS' main channel in place of regular overnight programs. Station personnel also gives viewers who subscribe to AT&T U-verse, DirecTV, Dish Network and other pay television providers within the KTBS viewing area that do not carry KTBS-DT2 the option of watching the affected shows on ABC's desktop and mobile streaming platforms or its cable/satellite video-on-demand service the day after their initial airing.

For many years, one of the most watched Sunday programs on KTBS has been The First Word, broadcasts of the morning worship services at the large First Baptist Church of Bossier City that began airing on channel 3 in June 1983. KTBS was the market's broadcaster of the Louisiana Lottery's televised drawings from the lottery's inception in 1993 until April 2009, when the rights to the midday and evening drawings were acquired by KTAL; KTBS re-acquired the rights to the drawings in 2012, and now air on sister station KPXJ at 9:59 p.m., with a replay being carried on channel 3 during KTBS 3 News at 10:00.

KTBS aired the Jerry Lewis MDA Labor Day Telethon for several decades leading up to 2015, when the Muscular Dystrophy Association (MDA) discontinued the telethon; nearly all of its tenure carrying the telethon was spent as the Ark-La-Tex region's "Love Network" affiliate, having raised hundreds of thousands of dollars to benefit the organization. KTBS was, due to the long-time ABC affiliation, one of the few "Love Network" affiliates to still air the telethon during its last two years (as the MDA Show of Strength), during which time it was aired as part of the ABC network schedule (on September 1, 2013, and again on its last telecast, August 31, 2014). Other fundraisers held by the station include the KTBS M*A*S*H B*A*S*H Blood Drive, and the St. Jude Dream Home Giveaway (its participation in the latter was notable for being the giveaway's first television broadcast partner in the U.S.).

=== News operation ===
As of September 2018, KTBS-TV broadcasts 33 1/2 hours of locally produced newscasts each week (with 5 1/2 hours each weekday and three hours each on Saturdays and Sundays); in regards to the number of hours devoted to news programming, it is the highest local newscast output among all broadcast television stations in the Shreveport–Texarkana market. In addition, KTBS-TV produces an additional 17 hours of locally produced newscasts each week for KPXJ (with three hours each on weekdays and one hour each on Saturday and Sundays), along with producing the hour-long high school football highlight show Friday Football Fever, which airs on KPXJ on Friday nights during the fall months. In total, KTBS produces 50 1/2 hours of local newscasts each week between the two stations.

In addition to the station's main studios on Kings Highway, KTBS operates a news bureau located on Jefferson Avenue in Texarkana, Arkansas. During the weeknight 6 and 10 p.m. newscasts, the station airs news segments featuring stories from the East Texas area. KTBS may simulcast its long-form severe weather coverage on KTBS-DT2 and/or KPXJ in the event that a tornado warning is issued for any county in its Ark-La-Tex viewing area.

==== News department history ====
During the late 1980s and early 1990s, KTBS became engaged in very competitive race with CBS affiliate KSLA for first place in overall news viewership, occasionally trading places with one another in certain time periods. At present, channel 3 generally places second, behind KSLA, in the early and late evening time periods among total viewers. During the May 2008 ratings period, KTBS's newscasts placed number one in several time periods.

In September 2000, in conjunction with the joint sales agreement that Paxson had signed with KTBS-TV, KPXJ began airing tape delayed rebroadcasts of that station's 5 and 10 p.m. newscasts Monday through Fridays at 5:30 and 10:30 p.m. (the latter beginning shortly before that program's live broadcast ended on channel 3). The rebroadcasts were discontinued on September 1, 2003, coinciding with the station's assumption of the UPN affiliation and the transfer of KPXJ to the Wray family's stewardship. On that date, KTBS began producing a nightly, half-hour prime time newscast at 9 p.m. for channel 21 (the first locally produced prime time newscast to be offered in the Shreveport–Texarkana market); that program, which utilizes the same format as the 10 p.m. newscast on KTBS, expanded to a full hour on August 3, 2009. On September 12, 2005, KTBS began producing a half-hour weekday 7 a.m. newscast for KPXJ, predating the debut of a two-hour-long 7 a.m. newscast on Fox affiliate KMSS-TV (channel 33) by two years. (That newscast was expanded to one hour in February 2012, and was later shifted to 9 a.m. in September 2013, placing it in direct competition with a half-hour newscast in that slot on KSLA).

On October 15, 2008, KTBS began broadcasting its newscasts in 16:9 widescreen standard definition. On June 28, 2010, KTBS expanded its 6 p.m. newscast to one hour, becoming the first station in the market to carry an hour-long 6 p.m. newscast (CBS affiliate KSLA began broadcasting an hour-long 6 p.m. newscast a short time later); as a result, KTAL is the only Big Three affiliate in the market to carry syndicated programming during the 6:30 half-hour. In July 2010, KTBS expanded the weekend edition of its 10 p.m. newscast to one hour (again, KSLA quickly followed suit with an hour-long newscast at 10 p.m. on weekends).

On August 30, 2010, KTBS expanded its weekday morning newscasts to 2 1/2 hours, by moving its start time to 4:30 a.m. (one of the few stations in a non-Top 50 Nielsen market to begin their weekday morning newscast at 4:30). On October 14, 2010, beginning with the station's 5 p.m. newscast, KTBS became the first television station in the Shreveport–Texarkana market to begin broadcasting its local newscasts in high definition (rival KSLA began producing its news programming in high definition the next morning).

In December 2012, KTBS became ensnared over the controversial firing of meteorologist Rhonda Lee. The station claims that she (and another newscaster) were fired for violating the station's policy on responding to Facebook comments, while supporters of Lee claim that she was fired for her decision to respond to a racist and sexist comment. On August 22, 2016, KTBS began producing an hour-long weekday afternoon newscast at 4 p.m. for KPXJ (titled KTBS 3 News at 4:00 on KPXJ 21), making it the first television station in the market to offer a local newscast to air in that timeslot. (The program would soon gain a competitor when KSLA launched its own hour-long 4 p.m. newscast two weeks later on September 7.)

== Technical information ==
=== Subchannels ===
The station's signal is multiplexed:

Subchannels of KTBS-TV
Subchannel	Res.	Short name	Programming
3.1	720p	KTBS	ABC
3.2	480i	KTBS-WX	KTBS 24-Hour Weather
3.3	480i	KTBS-24	KTBS 24-Hour News
3.4	480i	KTBS-MO	Movies!
21.1	720p	KPXJ-HD	The CW (KPXJ)
21.2	480i	KPXJ-ME	MeTV (KPXJ)
21.3	480i	KPXJ-ST	Start TV (KPXJ)
21.4	480i	KPXJ-AN	Antenna TV (KPXJ)

Broadcast on behalf of another station

As part of the deployment of ATSC 3.0 (NextGen TV) in Shreveport on June 28, KPXJ was converted to 3.0 service, airing subchannels 3.1 through 3.3 and 21.1. In exchange, all four of KPXJ's subchannels moved to the KTBS-TV multiplex for continued ATSC 1.0 broadcast, for a total of eight.

=== Analog-to-digital conversion ===
KTBS-TV ended regular programming on its analog signal, over VHF channel 3, on June 12, 2009, the official date on which full-power television stations in the United States transitioned from analog to digital broadcasts under federal mandate. The station's digital signal remained on its pre-transition UHF channel 28, using virtual channel 3.

As part of the SAFER Act, KTBS-TV kept its analog signal on the air until June 26 to inform viewers of the digital television transition through a loop of public service announcements from the National Association of Broadcasters.

== See also ==
- Channel 28 digital TV stations in the United States
- Channel 3 virtual TV stations in the United States
