= KTAL-TV =

Television station in Texarkana, Texas

- Texarkana, Texas–Arkansas; Shreveport, Louisiana; United States
- City: Texarkana, Texas
- Channels: Digital: 26 (UHF); Virtual: 6
- Branding: NBC 6

Programming
- Affiliations: 6.1: NBC; for others, see § Subchannels

Ownership
- Owner: Nexstar Media Group; (Nexstar Media Inc.)
- Sister stations: KSHV-TV, KMSS-TV

History
- First air date: August 16, 1953
- Former call signs: KCMC-TV (1953–1961)
- Former channel numbers: Analog: 6 (VHF, 1953–2009); Digital: 15 (UHF, 2002–2019)
- Former affiliations: CBS (1953–1961); DuMont (secondary, 1953–1956); NBC (secondary, 1953–1961); ABC (secondary, 1953–1961); PBS (per program, 1970–1972)
- Call sign meaning: Texas, Arkansas, Louisiana

Technical information
- Licensing authority: FCC
- Facility ID: 35648
- ERP: 888 kW
- HAAT: 484.9 m (1,591 ft)
- Transmitter coordinates: 32°54′11″N 94°0′21″W

Links
- Public license information: Public file; LMS
- Website: www.ktalnews.com

KTAL-TV (channel 6) is a television station licensed to Texarkana, Texas, United States, serving the Shreveport, Louisiana, area and the Ark-La-Tex region as an affiliate of NBC. It is owned by Nexstar Media Group alongside KSHV-TV (channel 45)—an independent station with MyNetworkTV—and is co-managed with Fox affiliate KMSS-TV (channel 33). The three stations share studios on North Market Street and Deer Park Road in northeast Shreveport; KTAL-TV maintains a secondary studio on Summerhill Road in Texarkana, Texas, and transmitter facilities northwest of Vivian, Louisiana.

== History ==
=== Early history in Texarkana ===
On May 2, 1951, the KCMC Inc. subsidiary of the Camden News Publishing Company—owned by Clyde E. Palmer (owner of the Texarkana Gazette and several other newspapers and radio stations across Arkansas and Texas) and his son-in-law Walter E. Hussman, Sr.—filed an application with the Federal Communications Commission (FCC) to obtain a license and construction permit to operate a commercial television station on VHF channel 6, the only television allocation assigned to Texarkana, Texas. The FCC granted the permit to the Palmer/Hussman-led group on February 5, 1953. The group subsequently requested and received approval to assign KCMC-TV as the television station's call letters, using the base callsign that had been used by Camden News Publishing's Texarkana radio station on 740 AM since it signed on in 1933 and applied to its radio sister on 98.1 FM (now KTAL-FM) when it signed on in 1948.

Originally scheduled to debut on 1 1/2 months earlier on July 1, the station first signed on the air on August 16, 1953. Channel 6 was the first television station to sign on in the Shreveport–Texarkana market and the first such station to be licensed to a city outside of Shreveport; it is also the only full-power television station in the Shreveport–Texarkana Designated Market Area that is licensed to a municipality not within the Louisiana portion of the market. It originally operated as a primary affiliate of CBS—an affiliation that was inherited through KCMC radio's longtime relationship with the television network's direct predecessor, the CBS Radio Network—although it also maintained secondary affiliations with NBC, ABC and the DuMont Television Network, carrying select programs from all three networks. KCMC-TV originally maintained studio facilities located on Summerhill Road and College Drive in northwestern Texarkana, Texas; the station originally maintained transmitter facilities on a 390-foot-tall (120 m) broadcast tower, originally transmitting at an estimated power of 28,200 watts, located on Summerhill Road and College Drive (0.4 miles [0.64 km] to the southwest).

In May 1954, the station's transmitter power output was increased to 100,000 watts. Despite the power increase, KCMC-TV was only able to provide a grade B ("rimshot") signal in rural northern Caddo Parish and could not be seen at all in Shreveport proper. (Station advertisements did not include Caddo Parish as being part of KCMC's viewing area, even though its designated area included the neighboring Louisiana parishes of Bossier, Webster and Claiborne and the neighboring Texas counties of Cass, Marion and Harrison.)

KCMC-TV disaffiliated from DuMont after the network ceased operations in August 1956, amid various issues that arose from DuMont's relations with Paramount Pictures that hamstrung it from expansion; this left KCMC-TV with a primary CBS affiliate with secondary affiliations with ABC and NBC. Ownership of KCMC-TV, KCMC radio, the Gazette and Camden News Publishing's other print and broadcast holdings would transfer to the familial heirs of Clyde Palmer—led by Walter Hussman, Sr.—after he succumbed from complications of a stroke he suffered on July 4, 1957 at the age of 80.

It was also the default NBC affiliate for the Longview portion of the Tyler–Longview market until KETK-TV first signed on the air.

=== Channel 6 relocates to Shreveport ===
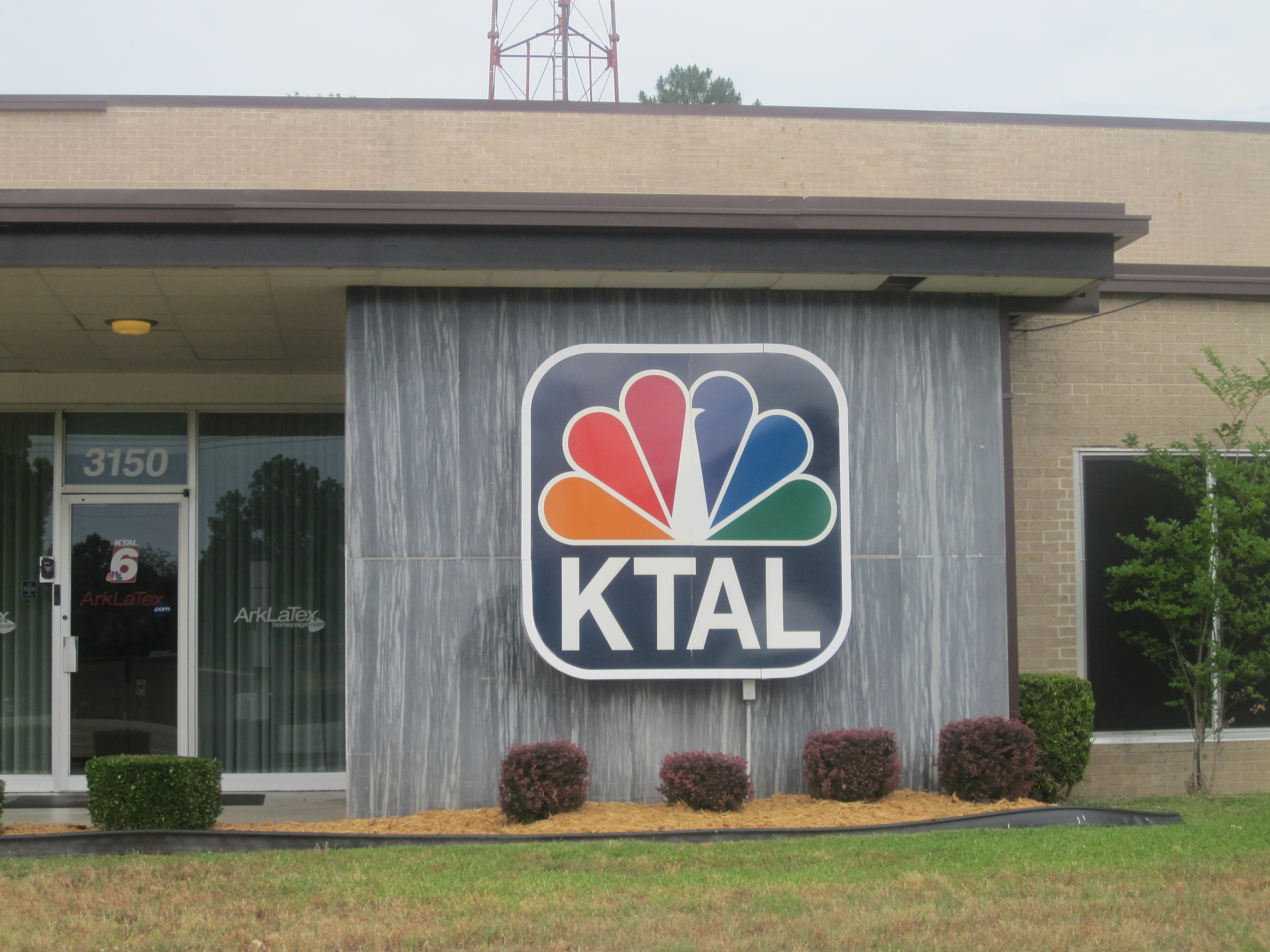
KTAL's primary studio facility in northeastern Shreveport.

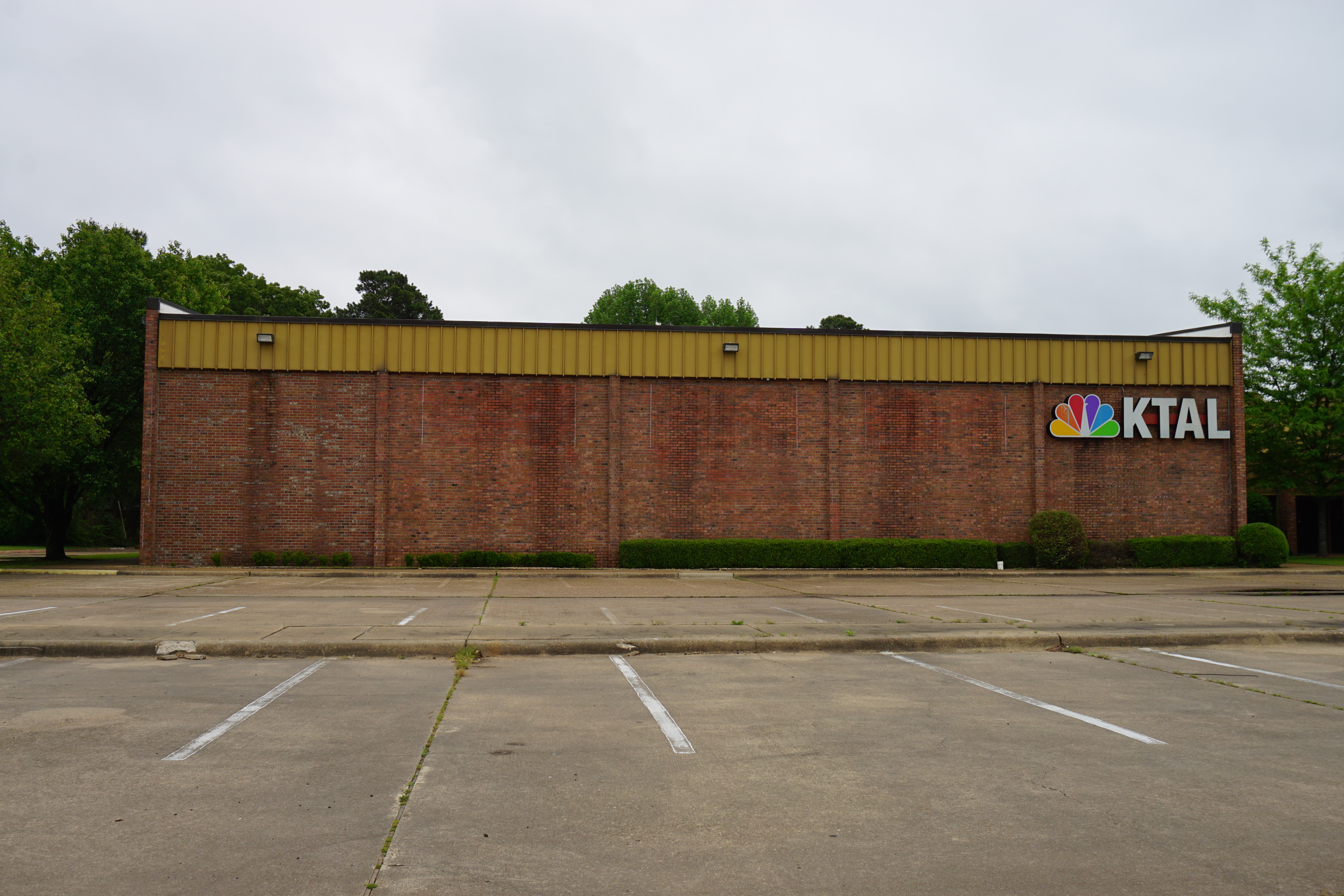
KTAL secondary studio building and news bureau in Texarkana, Texas.

On September 23, 1959, the FCC granted Camden News Publishing approval to construct a new transmitter tower for KCMC-TV at a site 2.3 miles (3.7 km) south-southwest of Vivian, Louisiana (approximately 46 miles [74 km] due south of the original transmitter site), opting to waive regulations that required a broadcast station's transmitter site be located no more than 15 miles (24 km) from its city of license (in this case, Texarkana, which is 72.3 miles [116.4 km] north-northwest of Shreveport).

CBS grew frustrated with having to maintain affiliations with two stations to carry its programming in an otherwise effectively consolidated market. In December 1960, CBS announced that it would disaffiliate from KCMC-TV and assume a full-time affiliation with Shreveport-based KSLA-TV (channel 12)—which had carried the network's programming since it signed on the air on January 1, 1954—citing that KSLA's signal decently covered Texarkana; with there being enough television stations serving the eastern two-thirds of the Ark-La-Tex region to allow it to maintain an exclusive affiliation, CBS therefore considered KCMC to be redundant. KCMC-TV was faced with the prospect of having to fall back on its secondary affiliation with the then-weak ABC (which would not gain a major foothold in the Nielsen ratings nationally until the latter part of the 1960s) or become an independent station—neither of which was a viable option for such a small market. Hussman thus persuaded the FCC to formally collapse Texarkana and Shreveport into a single television market.

The Vivian broadcast tower—which, at 1,580 feet (480 m), became the second-tallest transmission tower in the Southern United States at that time—was activated on May 1, 1961. The transmitter allowed the station to extended its signal deeper into parts of northwestern Louisiana and northeastern Texas that previously could not receive the station either adequately or at all as well as increasing its city-grade coverage deeper into the Shreveport area and extending up to 45 miles (72 km) to the south of the city. On that date, the station's call letters were changed to KTAL-TV, which served as both a reference to channel 6's three-state service area—Texas, Arkansas, and Louisiana—and to its new transmission tower. (The station was also phonetically referred to as "K-Tal" [or "Kay-Tall"] on an alternative basis until the mid-1970s.)

In March 1961, NBC reached an agreement with KTAL-TV to become the network's primary affiliate for the enlarged Shreveport–Texarkana market, replacing KTBS-TV (channel 3), which had served as Shreveport's original NBC affiliate since the station launched on September 3, 1955; KTBS's contract with NBC was not scheduled to expire until September 1962, though there had been speculation that KTBS and KTAL would swap primary affiliations before its expiration. On September 3, KTAL took over as the exclusive NBC affiliate for the Shreveport–Texarkana market; KTBS-TV concurrently became the market's exclusive ABC affiliate. Coinciding with the affiliation switch, KTAL-TV moved its primary operations into a new studio facility on Market Street in northeastern Shreveport, retaining its original Summerhill Road studios to primarily serve as a Texarkana news bureau. (FCC regulations had been changed in 1952 to allow for a broadcast station to house their main studio within 50 miles [80 km] of their city of license.) The FCC subsequently granted a reassignment of the KTAL license and its accompanying VHF channel 6 allocation to Shreveport on October 11, 1961.

In 1970, KTAL became one of several commercial stations in markets where the service did not have a member outlet to air the PBS program Sesame Street. To get that program on the air, an advocacy group called Citizens for Sesame Street was formed in the Shreveport–Bossier City area to fundraise to help cover the cost of bringing Sesame Street to local television. After struggling to find a timeslot for the show, having shifted it from 9 a.m. to 3 pm, the local programming rights to Sesame Street were moved to KSLA in February 1972, where it remained until both cable penetration allowed the show to be made available through other PBS member stations within the region and Louisiana Public Broadcasting (LPB) drafted plans to launch KLTS (channel 24), which launched as a satellite of the state network's Baton Rouge flagship, WLPB-TV, on August 9, 1978.

In 1975, Palmer Newspapers was renamed WEHCO Media, Inc., an abbreviation for the Walter E. Hussman Company. (The company is now run by Hussman's son, Walter E. Hussman, Jr.) In February 1975, in rulings that marked 16 "egregious" television station-print combinations for divestiture under the new law, the FCC ruled that WEHCO could not own both KTAL-TV and the Texarkana Gazette on grounds that the properties violated new cross-ownership rules that prohibited media companies from owning newspapers and full-power broadcast television and radio outlets in the same market, restricting media companies to owning only either a print or broadcast property within an individual market.

KCMC Inc. representatives subsequently filed an appeal against the decision, arguing that the rules did not apply with regards to its broadcast-print combination because KTAL's city-grade signal contour did not cover Texarkana and, therefore, that city was not its major market. In preparation for an appeal ruling that did not favor WEHCO, in the summer of 1979, the company attempted to sell KTAL-TV to Dallas-based A. H. Belo Corporation—then-owner of that market's ABC affiliate, WFAA—for a reported offer of $16.6 million. In August 1979, the U.S. District Court for the Eastern District of Texas ruled that the FCC had misinterpreted its own rules and could not lawfully apply the divestiture requirement to KCMC Inc./Texarkana Newspapers Inc., with regard to KTAL and the Texarkana Gazette.

=== Nexstar ownership; JSA/SSA with KMSS-TV and KSHV-TV ===
In July 2000, in an effort by the company to focus upon its newspaper properties, WEHCO Media announced it would sell KTAL-TV to the Irving, Texas-based Nexstar Broadcasting Group (co-founded by Perry A. Sook) for $35.25 million; the sale received FCC approval two months later on September 11. WEHCO subsequently sold its radio properties to separate buyers, with KCMC radio going to ArkLaTex, LLC and KTAL-FM being sold to Access.1 Communications Corp. In 2005, Cable One's Texarkana system and Cox Communications' Bossier City system both pulled KTAL due to compensation disputes during renewal negotiations of the station's carriage agreements with both providers, citing KTAL/Nexstar's reported request to increase carriage fees for both providers to 10 cents per subscriber. However, viewers in areas served by Cable One and Cox continued to be able to view the station over-the-air or on satellite via Dish Network or DirecTV. KTAL has since returned to Cable One and Cox, after reaching confidential agreements with both companies (Cox later turned over its Bossier City service area to Suddenlink Communications).

On April 24, 2013, Nexstar announced that it would acquire the nineteen television stations owned by Lafayette-based Communications Corporation of America (then-owner of Fox affiliate KMSS-TV [channel 33]) and White Knight Broadcasting (then-owner of MyNetworkTV affiliate KSHV-TV [channel 45], which maintained a time brokerage agreement with ComCorp to handle its operations) for $270 million in cash and stock. Because Nexstar could not legally purchase KMSS under FCC ownership rules as Shreveport has only eight full-power stations (the FCC requires a market to have at least eight unique owners once a duopoly is formed), and KTAL and KMSS were among the four highest-rated stations in the Shreveport market at the time of the transaction, plans called for KMSS to be acquired by Westlake, Ohio-based Nexstar partner company Mission Broadcasting for $27 million, while KSHV was to be sold to a female-controlled company, Denton, Texas-based Rocky Creek Communications (owned by Shirley Green), for $2.1 million. Nexstar planned to operate KMSS and KSHV under a shared services agreement, forming a virtual triopoly with KTAL.

However, on June 6, 2014, Nexstar announced that it would instead sell KMSS-TV to a new minority-owned company, Marshall Broadcasting (marking the company's first television station acquisitions), for $58.5 million. Subsequently, on August 5, Rocky Creek withdrew its application to acquire KSHV. Under the terms of the sale, Nexstar would assume operational responsibilities for KMSS and KSHV under a shared services agreement, forming a virtual triopoly with KTAL, leaving Shreveport's six major commercial stations under the control of just three broadcasting companies (the Wray family owns KTBS-TV and CW affiliate KPXJ (channel 21), while KSLA is owned by Gray Television). The sale of ComCorp to Nexstar, as well as that of KMSS to Marshall and a concurring acquisition of the time brokerage agreement with KSHV, received FCC approval on December 4, 2014, and was completed on January 1, 2015; KMSS and KSHV subsequently migrated their operations into KTAL's North Market Street studios in northeastern Shreveport.

== Programming ==
KTAL-TV currently broadcasts the entire NBC schedule; unlike most of Nexstar's legacy NBC affiliates, the station clears NBC's weekday overnight lineup (consisting of a rebroadcast of the fourth hour of Today and the customary loop of the network's early morning newscast Early Today) and most of its weekend overnight lineup of LXTV-produced lifestyle shows. Notably, in September 1984, KTAL made the decision to preempt The Tonight Show Starring Johnny Carson in favor of syndicated reruns of Dallas as a way to improve post-newscast ratings against KTBS and KSLA, which were also broadcasting syndicated programming in that timeslot. After no improvement in the ratings and criticism from viewers, KTAL resumed airing The Tonight Show on December 31, 1984.

=== News operation ===
As of September 2018, KTAL-TV presently broadcasts 22 hours of locally produced newscasts each week (with four hours each weekday and one hour each on Saturdays and Sundays). In addition, KTAL produces an additional 16 hours of locally produced newscasts each week for Fox-affiliated sister KMSS-TV (with three hours each weekday, and a half-hour each on Saturdays and Sundays) and 2 1/2 hours of newscasts each week for MyNetworkTV-affiliated sister KSHV-TV (with a half-hour each weekday).

In addition to its main studios in downtown Shreveport, KTAL operates a news bureau at its secondary studio facilities in Texarkana. KTAL may also simulcast long-form severe weather coverage on KMSS-TV and/or KSHV-TV in the event that a tornado warning is issued for any county in its Ark-La-Tex viewing area.

==== News department history ====
The station rebranded from NewsChannel 6 to KTAL News in 2006, dropping the channel number from its branding, as several of Nexstar's stations had done around that time. In 2009, the station once again retitled its newscasts from KTAL News to the current NBC 6 News; thus, reincorporating its original analog (now virtual) channel number into its branding after a three-year hiatus.

KTAL began broadcasting its local newscasts in partial widescreen standard definition on October 27, 2010. In-studio and field cameras continued to record in 4:3 SD, with video footage being upconverted to a 16:9 widescreen format in the control room.

On April 2, 2012, KTAL debuted a half-hour weekday noon newscast titled Arkansas Today, produced by Little Rock sister station KARK-TV (anchor Mallory Hardin and meteorologist/co-host Greg Dee also appear on KARK's weekday morning newscast); the statewide newscast features news stories filed by reporters from all four Nexstar-owned NBC affiliates serving Arkansas as well as a sports segment produced by Fayetteville sister station KNWA-TV, focusing on University of Arkansas athletics, called Razorback Nation. KTAL also provides a weather insert for southwest Arkansas during the broadcast. In addition to airing on KARK, KNWA and KTAL, the program is also simulcast on KTVE/Monroe–El Dorado (the coverage areas of KTVE and KTAL include several counties in southern Arkansas (ten in KTAL's viewing area, fourteen in KTVE's), though both stations primarily serve parts of northern Louisiana and KTAL also serves parts of northeast Texas).

On June 27, 2012, KTAL became the third (and last) news-producing station in the Shreveport–Texarkana market (after KTBS and KSLA) to begin broadcasting its local newscasts in high definition.

==== Notable former on-air staff ====
- Charles B. Pierce – weather anchor/art director/children's program host (1965–1968)
- Richard Zussman – political reporter (2008)

== Technical information ==
=== Subchannels ===
The station's signal is multiplexed. Two subchannels belonging to KSHV-TV were placed on this multiplex when ATSC 3.0 transmissions began in Shreveport in June 2022.

Subchannels of KTAL-TV
Subchannel	Res.	Short name	Programming
6.1	1080i	KTALDT	NBC
6.2	480i	Laff	Laff (4:3)
6.3	480i	Cozi	Cozi TV
6.4	480i	HSN	Busted (4:3)
45.2	480i	Mystery	Ion Mystery (KSHV-TV) (4:3)
45.3	480i	Ion	Ion (KSHV-TV)

Broadcast on behalf of another station

=== Analog-to-digital conversion ===
KTAL-TV ended regular programming on its analog signal, over VHF channel 6, on June 12, 2009, the official date on which full-power television stations in the United States transitioned from analog to digital broadcasts under federal mandate. The station's digital signal remained on its pre-transition UHF channel 15, using virtual channel 6.
