= KSLA =

Television station in Shreveport, Louisiana

- Shreveport, Louisiana; Texarkana, Texas–Arkansas; United States
- City: Shreveport, Louisiana
- Channels: Digital: 23 (UHF); Virtual: 12
- Branding: KSLA News 12

Programming
- Affiliations: 12.1: CBS; for others, see § Subchannels

Ownership
- Owner: Gray Media; (Gray Television Licensee, LLC)
- Sister stations: KTSH-CD

History
- First air date: January 1, 1954
- Former call signs: KSLA-TV (1954–2009)
- Former channel numbers: Analog: 12 (VHF, 1954–2009); Digital: 17 (UHF, 2000–2020)
- Former affiliations: All secondary: NBC (1954–1955); DuMont (1954–1955); ABC (1954–1961); United (1967); NET/PBS (per-program; 1972–1977); UPN (1995)
- Call sign meaning: "Shreveport, Louisiana"

Technical information
- Licensing authority: FCC
- Facility ID: 70482
- ERP: 190 kW
- HAAT: 541 m (1,775 ft)
- Transmitter coordinates: 32°40′28.3″N 93°56′0″W
- Translator(s): KTSH-CD 19.5 Shreveport; KTEV-LD 19.2 Texarkana, AR

Links
- Public license information: Public file; LMS
- Website: www.ksla.com

KSLA (channel 12) is a television station in Shreveport, Louisiana, United States, serving as the CBS affiliate for the Ark-La-Tex region. It is owned by Gray Media alongside low-power, Class A Telemundo affiliate KTSH-CD (channel 19). The two stations share studios on Fairfield Avenue and Dashiel Street (southeast of I-20) in central Shreveport; KSLA's transmitter is located near St. Johns Baptist Church Road (southeast of Mooringsport and Caddo Lake) in rural northern Caddo Parish.

== History ==
=== Early history ===
The VHF channel 12 allocation was contested between three groups that competed for approval by the Federal Communications Commission (FCC) to be granted a construction permit on one of Shreveport's two television channels. On June 27, 1952, one week before the FCC released a Report and Order reallocation memorandum that lifted a four-year moratorium on new television broadcast license applications, two Shreveport-based groups filed respective applications for the permit: Radio Station KRMD Inc. (then-parent of radio station KRMD (1340 AM) and principally owned by T. B. Lanford, who owned radio stations in Texas, Louisiana and Mississippi), and the Shreveport Television Co. (owned by movie theater operator Don George, Ben Beckham and William Carter Henderson, the latter being the son of KWKH founder William Kennon Henderson, Jr). The Southland Television Co.—a group led by Lester Kamin (owner of Houston-based Kamin Advertising Agency), John H. Pace (general manager of Southland-owned radio station KCIJ (980 AM)), and Dallas-based attorneys Pat Coon and Billy B. Goldberg—became the third applicant for the license on July 10, 1952. Several Shreveport residents bought a majority share in Southland in early 1953. In hearing, Southland attacked the KRMD facilities proposal as inadequate.

In August 1953, citing a desire to speed the arrival of television to Shreveport, Radio Station KRMD Inc., the Shreveport Television Co., and the Southland Television Co. submitted a joint application to the FCC to operate VHF channel 12 pending the outcome of the comparative hearings on their individual applications. The applicants held one-third interests in a new venture, Interim Television Corp., which would build operate the station until the FCC determined a grantee; at that time, the designated winner would buy out the others, with the permit becoming invalidated no longer than 10 days after the regular permit was issued to the winning applicant. The FCC granted the permit to the temporary corporation on September 18, and the construction permit took the call sign KSLA-TV, representing the station's location, Shreveport, Louisiana.

The station first signed on the air on January 1, 1954, as the first station in Shreveport proper and the second in the market, after KCMC-TV, which had gone on the air from Texarkana, Texas, on August 16, 1953. Channel 12 has been a CBS television affiliate since its debut, inheriting those rights through KWKH radio's longtime relationship with the CBS Radio Network; it also maintained secondary affiliations with ABC, NBC and the DuMont Television Network. Channel 12 – which is one of two stations in the market to have never changed its primary network affiliation, along with Fox affiliate KMSS-TV (channel 33) – originally operated out of studio facilities housed inside the Washington Youree Hotel, located on Edwards and Travis Streets in downtown Shreveport. KSLA temporarily transmitted its signal from a 277-foot (84 m) broadcast tower located near the intersection of Lake and Market Streets in downtown Shreveport.

=== Shreveport Television Company and Shreveport Journal ownership ===
On June 8, 1954, FCC hearing examiner Fanney N. Litvin issued an initial decision looking to grant the Shreveport Television Company the construction permit application for channel 12, citing its lack of radio facilities and better television programming proposals, facilities and staffing commitments. The FCC Broadcast Bureau granted exclusive rights to the permit to Shreveport Television Company on May 19, 1955, formally denying KRMD and Southland Television's respective bids. Both competitors filed exception petitions to the FCC examiner's initial decision favoring Shreveport Television on the grounds Litvin cited in the 73-page order. The FCC reaffirmed its prior decision on November 17, 1955, denying the Southland petition for rehearing and reconsideration of the grant and formally dismissing the competing bids. On March 5, 1955, Elvis Presley made his television debut on KSLA on the local music program Louisiana Hayride, which was produced from the Municipal Auditorium. That same year, D. L. Dykes, Jr., who launched a 30-year career as the pastor of the First Methodist Church at the Head of Texas Street in downtown Shreveport, began having his sermons televised on KSLA; over the years, other churches followed Dykes's lead.

KSLA disaffiliated from NBC after KTBS-TV (channel 3) signed on as Shreveport's second television station on September 3, 1955. DuMont ceased operations in September 1955; KSLA remained a primary CBS affiliate with secondary ABC and DuMont affiliations until the latter network discontinued operations in August 1956, amid various issues that arose from DuMont's relations with Paramount Pictures that hamstrung it from expansion; that year, the station also added an additional affiliation with the NTA Film Network. KSLA activated its permanent transmission facility on November 24, 1955; at 1,195 feet (364 m), the tower helped to significantly increase the station's reach from 177,100 viewers to 1.089 million viewers throughout northwestern Louisiana, northeastern Texas and southwestern Arkansas. It also marked the end of more than two years of interim operation.

KSLA and KTBS-TV continued to share limited amounts of ABC programming until 1961, when Texarkana, Texas–licensed KTAL-TV (channel 6) assumed the local rights to the NBC affiliation after KTAL owner Palmer Newspapers received FCC permission to relocate that station's transmitter closer to Shreveport, effectively folding the Texarkana area into the Shreveport television market. As a consequence, KTBS-TV chose to become an exclusive ABC affiliate; this left KSLA affiliated with CBS and the NTA Film Network, the latter of which KSLA continued to provide select programs from until that network ceased operations in 1961. Another local program aired on KSLA during this time was Hallelujah Train, a Sunday morning program many consider as a religious version of Soul Train. In 1959, KSLA became the first television station in the Shreveport market to broadcast in color.

In January 1960, the Shreveport Television Company to KSLA-TV Inc.—a local group headed by the Journal Publishing Company (owned by Douglas F. Attaway, owner and publisher of the now-defunct Shreveport Journal), Eugenie B. George, Dolores George LaVigne and various additional stockholders that included Winston B. Linam (who remained KSLA's station manager)—for $3.396 million; the sale received FCC approval on May 25. Under Journal Publishing ownership, KSLA was referred to as "The Journal Station" in on-air and print promotions during the second half of the 1960s and the early 1970s. In January 1965, the Journal Publishing Company filed a petition asking to deny a construction permit application by Television Broadcasters Inc. to build a new 1,000-foot (305 m)-tall transmission tower for ABC affiliate KBMT (which also transmitted on channel 12) in Beaumont, Texas, at a site two miles (3.2 km) west of Mauriceville. Journal Publishing charged that the new KBMT transmitter—which was proposed to be placed 33.5 miles (53.9 km) north of its existing transmitter location—would be short-spaced 18 miles (29 km) closer to the KSLA transmitter than permitted by standard mileage separation rules to prevent signal interference and that the FCC's order granting the application had not afforded KSLA "equivalent protection" that Television Broadcasters stated that it would in the original application. On October 29, 1966, the FCC granted construction permits to KSLA and KBMT to install precise frequency control systems to limit signal interference between the two stations.

For one month, in May 1967, KSLA maintained a secondary affiliation with the United Network (also known as the Overmyer Network), a short-lived attempt to create a fourth national commercial television network; it was one of several stations nationwide to broadcast United/Overmyer's short-lived late night program, The Las Vegas Show. In 1972, the station relocated its operations into its current studio facilities on Fairfield Avenue and Dashiel Street (near Schumpert Medical Center).

=== Local ownership by KSLA-TV Inc.; Viacom ownership ===
After Attaway sold the Shreveport Journal to local businessman and philanthropist Charles T. Beaird, in February 1976, the Journal Publishing Company announced it would sell the station to KSLA-TV Inc. (a local consortium owned by Attaway, Delores La Vigne and Winston B. Linam) for $2.823 million; the transfer received FCC approval on May 27. During the early morning of October 8, 1977, the station's 1,709-foot (521 m) transmitter tower located 2 miles (3.2 km) east-southeast of Mooringsport collapsed. Speculation centered upon a failure in a guy wire cable attached to the tower at the 800-foot (240 m) level that swayed significantly in winds sustained at 35 to 40 mph (56 to 64 km/h), with the rippling to be so great that it caused to the wire to snap and the tower broke at the aforementioned level and fell on the reinforced concrete transmitter building below, which was undamaged; however, no official cause was ever determined. The KSLA-TV signal was knocked off the air until the station set up temporary transmitter facilities that afternoon from a nearby auxiliary tower, although the shorter tower resulted in the station's coverage radius being significantly reduced from about 90 miles (140 km) to 45 miles (72 km). In March 1978, KSLA constructed and activated a new 1,794-foot-tall (547 m) tower on the site of the former transmitter facility.

On January 19, 1983, KSLA-TV Inc. announced it would sell the station to the Viacom International subsidiary of New York City–based Viacom in a tax-free stock swap valued at $29.9 million. Under the terms of the deal, KSLA-TV Inc.—which became a wholly owned subsidiary of Viacom International—exchanged its stock for one million shares in Viacom. The sale received FCC approval two months later on March 30. In 1984, KSLA-TV became the first television station in the Shreveport–Texarkana market to broadcast in stereo, initially broadcasting CBS network programs, local programs and certain syndicated shows that were transmitted in the audio format. In March 1989, the station began preempting CBS Sunday Morning with Charles Kuralt in favor of running religious programming and infomercials in its timeslot. This sparked outrage from viewers, resulting in a letter-writing campaign to Viacom, CBS and local newspapers to push for Sunday Morning's return to channel 12. The station was even subjected to picketing by upset viewers in an effort to get the show reinstated. Following a change in station management, KSLA reinstated Sunday Morning onto its schedule on August 27, 1989.

=== Ellis and Raycom ownership ===
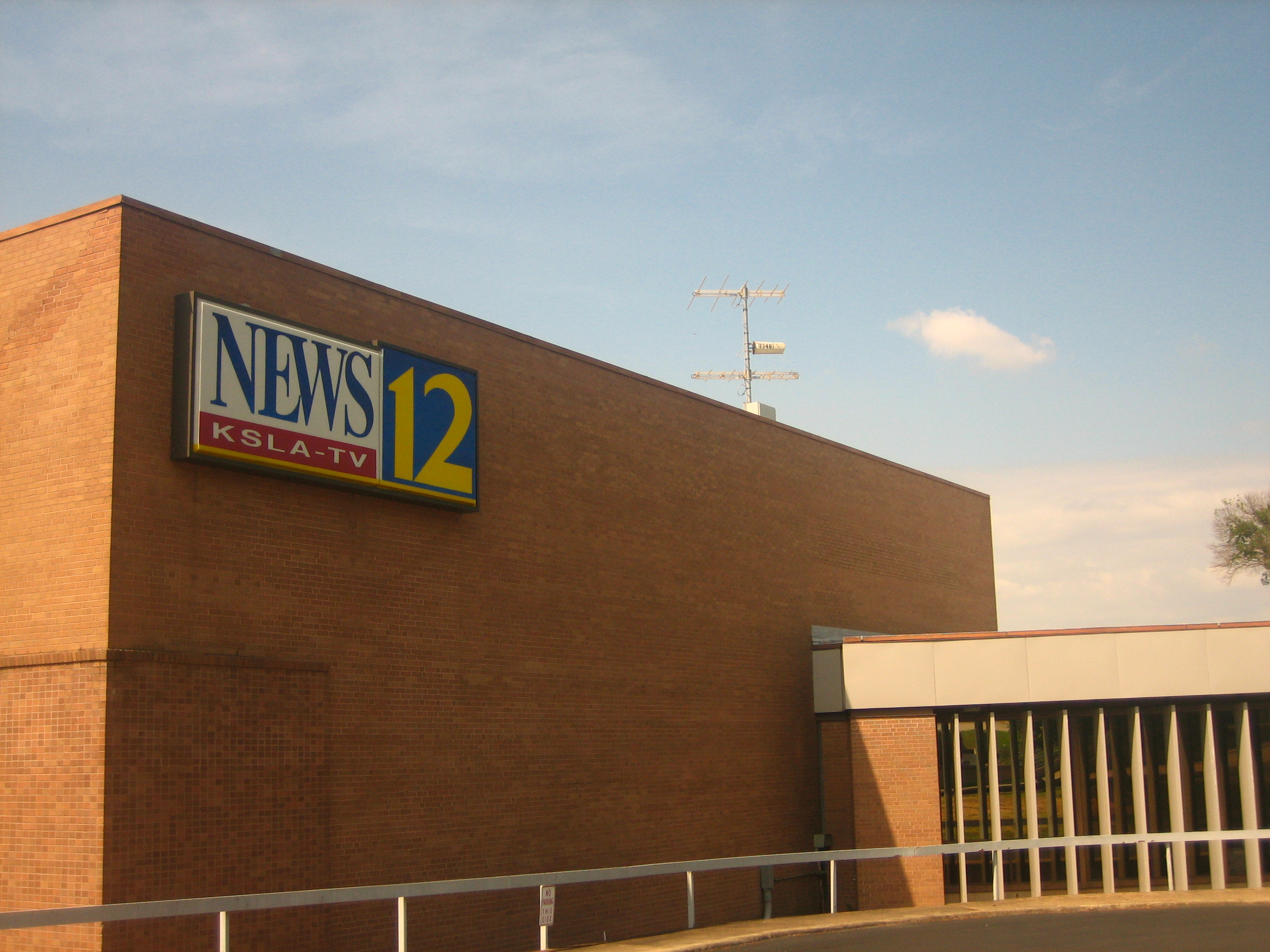
KSLA studios building in 2008

In 1994, following the completion of Viacom's acquisition of Paramount Pictures from Gulf+Western, Viacom's five television stations—KSLA; fellow CBS affiliate KMOV in St. Louis; and NBC affiliates WHEC-TV in Rochester, New York; WNYT in Albany, New York; and WVIT in New Britain, Connecticut—came under common ownership with Paramount's broadcasting arm, the Paramount Stations Group.

Shortly before the merger, Paramount announced the formation of the United Paramount Network (UPN), which started operating on January 16, 1995, with channel 12 as a charter owned-and-operated station; due to its CBS programming commitments, KSLA carried UPN's Monday and Tuesday prime time programming between 11:35 p.m. and 1:35 a.m. on both nights. This arrangement ended on August 22, 1995, six days before KSHV-TV (channel 45, now a MyNetworkTV affiliate)—through a programming revamp tied to a shared services agreement (SSA) it reached with Associated Broadcasters Inc.–owned Fox affiliate KMSS-TV—took over as the UPN affiliate for the Shreveport–Texarkana market.

Following the merger with Paramount, Viacom was reported to be considering the sale of all of its non-UPN stations. On May 12, 1995, Viacom announced that it would sell KSLA to Englewood, New Jersey–based Hillside Broadcasting (owned by Mario and Della Baeza) for $30 million. Viacom had planned to sell channel 12 both as part of its sale of the company's non-UPN affiliated stations (with KSLA being the first such station to be divested) and to comply with FCC rules of the time that prohibited a single company from owning more than twelve television stations nationwide; the sale to Hillside hinged on the completion of Viacom's $27-million purchase of Atlanta independent station WVEU from Broadcasting Corporation of Georgia. Hillside Broadcasting backed out of the deal on June 27; subsequently on July 1, Ellis Communications (owned by Atlanta-based businessman Bert Ellis)—which was formed two years earlier with the purchase of the original New Vision Group stations, and was an investor in Hillside Broadcasting—announced it would acquire KSLA for $30 million. The transaction was approved by the FCC on August 24, and was completed eight days later on September 1, 1995.

On May 16, 1996, Ellis Communications announced it would sell its fifteen television and two radio stations and sports production/syndication firm Raycom Sports to Atlanta-based Ellis Acquisitions Inc. (founded by Boston-based M&A lawyer Stephen Burr, with financing from Montgomery, Alabama-based pension fund administrator Retirement Systems of Alabama) in an all-cash deal worth $732 million; the Ellis Communications stations as well as subsequent purchases of television stations owned by AFLAC and Detroit-based Federal Enterprises Inc. served as the charter properties of Raycom Media. The purchase of KSLA and the Ellis stations received FCC approval on July 26, 1996.

=== Sale to Gray Television ===
On June 25, 2018, Atlanta-based Gray Television announced it had reached an agreement with Raycom to merge their respective broadcasting assets (consisting of Raycom's 63 existing owned-and/or-operated television stations, including KSLA, and Gray's 93 television stations) under Gray's corporate umbrella. The cash-and-stock merger transaction valued at $3.6 billion—in which Gray shareholders would acquire preferred stock currently held by Raycom—resulted in KSLA gaining new sister stations in nearby markets, including primary CBS/subchannel-only Fox and MyNetworkTV affiliate KXII in Sherman, Texas, primary CBS/subchannel-only ABC affiliate KNOE-TV in Monroe and primary NBC/subchannel-only CBS affiliate KALB-TV in Alexandria, in addition to its current sister stations under Raycom ownership; as a result, the combined company will have broadcast properties in six of the seven television markets serving Louisiana (with Lafayette as the lone exception). The sale was approved on December 20, and was completed on January 2, 2019.

After being acquired by Gray, KSLA expanded its signal reach to areas that struggled to receive its signal in the post-digital transition. In 2022, Gray acquired former The Box affiliate KBXS-CD in Shreveport and added the main CBS feed to its fifth subchannel shortly before changing the call sign to KTSH-CD to serve as the Telemundo affiliate for the market. In the same year, Gray acquired Texarkana, Arkansas–based station KTEV-CD from Buma Group and Tyler, Texas–based K14NR-D from Windsong Communications. By 2023, these two stations became translators of KSLA for the northern and western parts of the Shreveport market, respectively; while K14NR-D is licensed to Tyler, its signal only covers the immediate Longview area.

== Programming ==
As the Shreveport–Texarkana market did not have a PBS member station at the time, KSLA was among several commercial television stations in markets without a PBS station that carried programs from the service on a per-program basis. KSLA carried Sesame Street each weekday morning from February 7, 1972, until May 27, 1977, assuming the show from KTAL, which had carried it from 1970 until 1972. By the time KSLA removed the show from the airwaves, Louisiana Public Broadcasting (LPB) was in preparation for signing on KLTS-TV (channel 24) as a satellite of the member network's Baton Rouge flagship, WLPB-TV, and other PBS member stations were carried on cable. KSLA was among the first fifty television stations in the country to air the hybrid local/national lifestyle newsmagazine concept PM Magazine (which was licensed by Westinghouse Broadcasting and was also titled Evening Magazine when broadcast on Group W's television stations), it ran on the station from 1979 to 1984. The local version of the program was hosted by program producer Chuck Smith and Becky Strickland; it became one of the consistently highest-rated versions of PM in the country, beating syndicated programs (such as M*A*S*H, The Newlywed Game and The People's Court), sometimes averaging audience shares higher than 30 percent throughout its five-year run on KSLA and had garnered a 25 rating/39 share by the end of the run of the program. Despite its local success, the KSLA edition of PM Magazine was canceled in early 1984 and was replaced by reruns of Three's Company (which was distributed by Viacom at the time), resulting in an almost immediate decline in audience share to one-tenth of that PM had when it ran in the 6:30 p.m. timeslot.

=== Sports programming ===
KSLA was once the home of the Shreveport Captains, the defunct Canadian Football League team, the Shreveport Pirates, and Southeastern Conference sporting events, the latter of which they continue to air via the SEC's deal with CBS Sports. From 1994 to 2009, KSLA was a charter outlet of Raycom Sports, an ad hoc syndication service that mainly carries college football and basketball games not carried by regional sports networks (such as Fox Sports South) and select national broadcast and cable networks (such as ESPN). The Raycom-produced game telecasts consisted of events involving teams in the SEC (including those involving the Louisiana State University Tigers, the Texas A&M Aggies, the Ole Miss Rebels and the Mississippi State Bulldogs), airing between ten and twelve regular season games from each sport per year, with most college football and basketball telecasts airing on Saturday afternoons. Some games resulted in the station preempting sports broadcasts from CBS Sports and, occasionally, CBS prime time shows on its main channel; however, KSLA-DT2 served as an alternate feed of the service, carrying college basketball and football games that KSLA-DT1 could not carry due to CBS programming commitments.

Since 2001, KSLA has also held the local broadcast rights to NFL preseason games from the New Orleans Saints; the station carries roughly between three and five prime time game telecasts annually due to the Saints preseason games being produced by sister station WVUE.

On December 30, 2023, KSLA parent company Gray Television announced it had reached an agreement with the New Orleans Pelicans to air 10 games on the station during the 2023–24 season.

On September 17, 2024, Gray and the Pelicans announced a broader deal to form the Gulf Coast Sports & Entertainment Network, which will broadcast nearly all 2024–25 Pelicans games on Gray's stations in the Gulf South, including KSLA.

== News operation ==
As of September 2018, KSLA presently broadcasts 33 hours of locally produced newscasts each week (with six hours each weekday and 1 1/2 hours each on Saturdays and Sundays). In addition, KSLA-DT3 broadcasts eight hours of locally produced newscasts each week: consisting of an hour-long extension of KSLA News 12 This Morning, and a simulcast of the hour-long 6 p.m. newscast carried on the station's main feed, both on weekdays.

=== News department history ===
The station's first news anchor and news director, Don Owen, established KSLA's news department. Initially serving as a weather anchor, Owen became a highly trusted figure among area viewers during his three-decade tenure at the station; a local columnist in the Shreveport Times once referred him "the Walter Cronkite of the Shreveport media market," comparing him to the legendary CBS News anchor. Al Bolton served as the station's first meteorologist. Bolton also served as host of Al's Corral, a western-themed children's program that was one of the station's most popular local programs. Bolton remained the meteorologist until May 1991, when he began a ten-year association with KRMD radio before retiring. Bolton received the "Seal of Certification" from the National Weather Association in 1982 for "performance well above the media and meteorological standards".

In 1961, Bob Griffin joined KSLA as the station's sports editor. Griffin—who originally expected to stay in Shreveport for one or two years before deciding to embark on a 50-year-plus career in the Shreveport market—became personally acquainted with statistics of area athletes, some of whom reached national prominence. He also served as host of Bob & His Buddies, a children's show that aired on channel 12 during the 1960s, and the short-lived What's News?, a current events quiz program for high schoolers that ran from 1963 to 1965, which featured questions based on stories featured on KSLA's newscast and sports segments during the previous week. In October 1967, Nita Fran Hutcheson (later a chamber of commerce official in her hometown of Texarkana, Texas) was hired by Owen to serve as an assignment reporter; her appointment made history, with Hutcheson becoming the first female television reporter in the Shreveport–Texarkana market. Under Owen's stewardship, the station also hired Margaret Pelley (later of Dateline NBC) and Roseanne Colletti (later at WNBC in New York City) to serve as part of the station's reporting staff, along with local figures such as Wray Post, Tom and Barry Irwin, Carl Pendley, and Tony Taglavore.

In the late 1970s, KSLA was the first television station in the Shreveport–Texarkana market to update transition from film to videotape. In 1983, KSLA also became the first to operate a live satellite truck to assist in newsgathering purposes.

In September 2008, KSLA became the first television station in Louisiana (and one of the first in the nation) to air a weekday morning newscast at 9 a.m. In September 2010, KSLA expanded its weeknight 6 p.m. newscast to one hour and expanded the weekend edition of its 10 p.m. newscast to one hour. On October 15, 2010, KSLA became the second television station in the Shreveport–Texarkana market to begin broadcasting its local newscasts in high definition.

On September 7, 2016, KSLA launched a half-hour newscast at 4 p.m. on weekday afternoons.

In recent years, the station's news department has won several Regional Emmy Awards and four Regional Edward R. Murrow Awards for its news coverage. In 2019, the station was awarded a national Murrow Award for excellence in multimedia.

=== Notable former on-air staff ===
- David Begnaud
- Dennis Bounds – anchor/reporter (1987–1991)
- Christine Negroni – reporter

== Technical information ==
=== Subchannels ===
The station's signal is multiplexed:

Subchannels of KSLA
| Subchannel | Res. | Short name | Programming |
|---|---|---|---|
| 12.1 | 1080i | KSLACBS | CBS |
| 12.2 | 720p | KSLAGSN | Gulf Coast SEN |
| 12.3 | 480i | KSLABOU | Bounce TV |
| 12.4 | 480i | KSLAGRI | Grit |
| 12.5 | 480i | KSLADAB | Dabl |
| 12.6 | 480i | KSLADEF | Ion Plus |
| 45.4 | 480i | Quest | Quest (KSHV-TV) |

Broadcast on behalf of another station

=== Analog-to-digital conversion ===
KSLA ended regular programming on its analog signal, over VHF channel 12, on June 12, 2009, the official date on which full-power television stations in the United States transitioned from analog to digital broadcasts under federal mandate. The station's digital signal remained on its pre-transition UHF channel 17, using virtual channel 12.
