= Charley Weaver's Hobby Lobby =

- Also known as: Hobby Lobby, The Charley Weaver Show
- Genre: Interview/variety
- Created by: Allan Sherman
- Written by: Cliff Arquette; Harvey Bullock
- Theme music composer: George Tibbles

Production
- Producer: Allan Sherman
- Running time: 30 minutes
- Production company: American Broadcasting Company

Original release
- Network: ABC
- Release: September 30, 1959 – March 23, 1960

Charley Weaver's Hobby Lobby was a half-hour television interview show produced by Allan Sherman and the American Broadcasting Company (ABC), and broadcast weekly in the United States by the ABC network 8–8:30 pm (Eastern Standard Time) on Wednesdays in the 1959–60 television season.

== History ==
The show premiered on September 30, 1959. Cliff Arquette, in his Charley Weaver persona, hosted the show throughout the run of the series. For the first two months, the show was called Charley Weaver's Hobby Lobby, but on November 25, 1959, the name of the show was changed to The Charley Weaver Show.

The first episodes essentially followed the same format as the Hobby Lobby radio interview show hosted by Dave Elman and broadcast from 1937 to 1949: people, both celebrities and not, were interviewed about their hobbies, both unusual and not. But by the end of November, "variety and comedy sketches" had been added, and hobby discussions were dropped. Charley Weaver's "Letters from Mama" monologues concerning daily life in the fictional town of Mount Idy were always part of the show, with the other members of the cast playing characters referred to in the letters.

The last show was broadcast March 23, 1960.

== Cast ==
- Cliff Arquette (host) as Charley Weaver and as Charley's mother, "Mama Weaver"
- Pat Carroll
- Chuck McCann as Wallis Swine
- Charles R. Althoff as Grandpa Snyder
- Nancy Kovack (credited as Nancy Kovac) as "witch of the year"
- Irene Ryan as beauty pageant winner Miss Mount Idy

== Guests ==
Guests on the show included:

- Gloria DeHaven (September 30, 1959) Hobby discussed: Antique Music Boxes
- Gypsy Rose Lee (October 7, 1959). Hobby discussed: Sport Fishing.
- Zsa Zsa Gabor (October 14, 1959). Hobby discussed: Fencing.
- Guy Madison (November 4, 1959). Hobby discussed: Archery
- Eddie Bracken (November 18, 1959).
- Edie Adams (November 25, 1959).
- Abigail Van Buren (November 25, 1959)
- Faye Emerson (December 2, 1959).
- Harold Rome (December 2, 1959).
- Audrey Meadows (December 9, 1959).
- Cedric Hardwicke (December 16, 1959).
- Barbara Nichols (December 23, 1959).
- Arthur Treacher (December 30, 1959).
- Maureen O'Hara (1960?)
