= KNBS (TV) =

Television station in Walla Walla, Washington (1960)

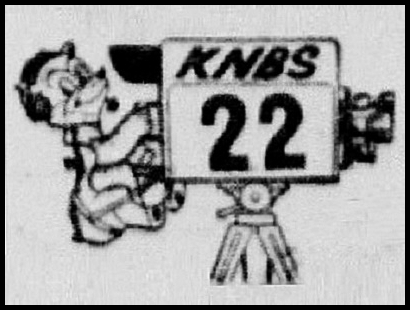

Walla Walla, Washington; United States
- Channels: Analog: 22 (UHF)

Programming
- Affiliations: ABC

Ownership
- Owner: Northwest Broadcasting System, Inc.

History
- First air date: January 3, 1960
- Last air date: December 14, 1960; (346 days)

Technical information
- ERP: 273 kW
- HAAT: 335 m (1,100 ft)

KNBS (channel 22) was a television station in Walla Walla, Washington, United States, which broadcast from January 3 to December 14, 1960, as an affiliate of ABC. Owned by Northwest Broadcasting System, Inc., the station closed due to lack of capital to continue operations.

== History ==
Northwest Broadcasting System, Inc., a group of investors from Los Angeles, was granted a construction permit to build a new television station on channel 22 in Walla Walla in 1959. The investor group also included Chuck Connors, who at the time starred in the ABC show The Rifleman; Connors, who invested $5,000 in the venture, was paid $1,000 a year for five years to be the station's "executive vice president". The station went on air January 3, 1960, from studios in downtown Walla Walla and a transmitter on Pikes Peak in Oregon, just across the state line. In addition to network programming from ABC, the station produced local news, sports and weather; a local variety show, Bondwagon; and a square dancing program, among others.

While Walla Walla's first TV station had the acceptance of the local community, it lacked the cash to keep going, despite increasing and adequate revenues, because of the costs incurred in launching the venture and lower than anticipated interest from potential local investors. In late 1960, Lyle Bond, who had been the vice president, station manager and newsreader, left for a station in San Diego, California. On the night of December 14, 1960, at sign-off, vice president and chief engineer William Barclay appeared to inform viewers of the station's closure and expressed hope that a new owner would appear to keep KNBS in operation; that same week, the station filed for bankruptcy listing $169,000 in liabilities and $90,000 in assets, and a receiver was appointed to manage the process of selling it to the highest bidder.

A high bid of $50,000, including the assumption of $27,000 in outstanding liens, for KNBS was placed by the Alert Acceptance Corp. of Portland, Oregon, a financial and property management business, and approved in January 1961. The sale to Alert was voided in June, after the company never paid the bid; additionally, it had not filed for Federal Communications Commission approval to transfer the license from Northwest Broadcasting System. While receiver Eugene Golden noted interest from others at the time that Alert's sale was voided, the station was never reactivated. Local television of any kind in Walla Walla would take 20 years to be reestablished, emerging in the form of a cable television channel in 1981.
