= Mooringsport, Louisiana =

- Town
- Town of Mooringsport
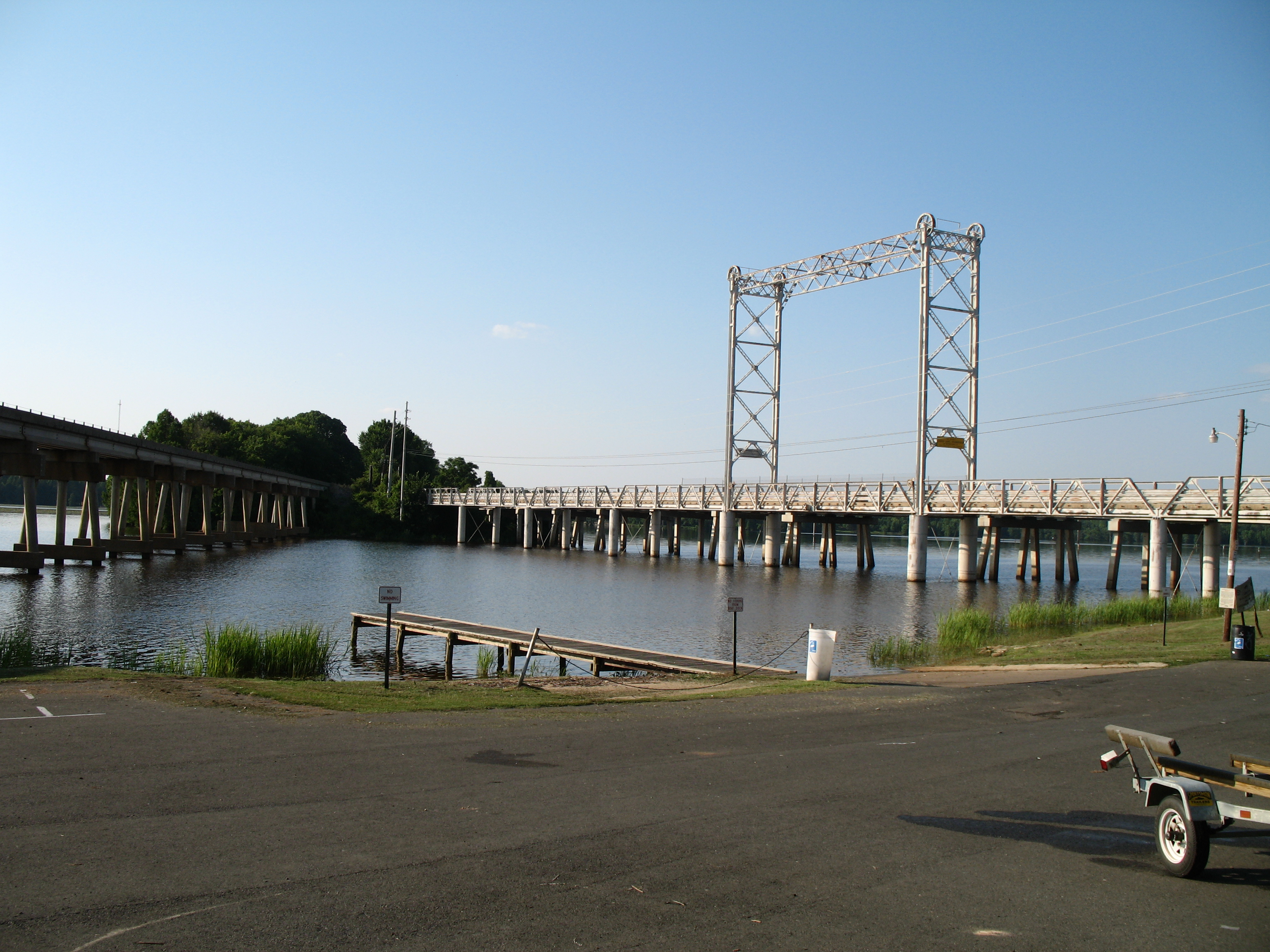
- Caddo Lake Drawbridge

- Location of Mooringsport in Caddo Parish, Louisiana.

- Location of Louisiana in the United States
- Coordinates: 32°40′56″N 93°57′38″W
- Country: United States
- State: Louisiana
- Parish: Caddo

Government
  - Mayor: Tyler Gordon

Area
  - Total: 1.30 sq mi (3.36 km^{2})
  - Land: 1.29 sq mi (3.34 km^{2})
  - Water: 0.0077 sq mi (0.02 km^{2})
- Elevation: 243 ft (74 m)

Population (2020)
  - Total: 748
  - Rank: CD: 6th
  - Density: 580.6/sq mi (224.16/km^{2})
- Time zone: UTC-6 (CST)
  - Summer (DST): UTC-5 (CDT)
- Area code: 318
- FIPS code: 22-51830
- GNIS feature ID: 2406190

Mooringsport is an incorporated municipality in the U.S. state of Louisiana, located in Caddo Parish. Part of the Shreveport–Bossier City metropolitan area and located approximately 18 miles (29 km) outside of the principal city of Shreveport, the town of Mooringsport had a population of 748 at the 2020 U.S. census.

== History ==
Settled by Alabama and North Carolina settlers in 1836, present-day Mooringsport served as a minor economic hub for steamboats transporting cotton. From its continued growth into an established settlement, the Kansas City Southern Railway came through the area.

== Geography ==
Mooringsport is located in western Caddo Parish on the south shore of Caddo Lake. Louisiana Highway 1 bypasses the municipality 2 miles (3 km) to the east. Downtown Shreveport is approximately 18 miles (29 km) to the southeast. According to the United States Census Bureau in 2010, Mooringsport had a total area of 1.17 square miles (3.04 km^{2}), of which 1.16 square miles (3.01 km^{2}) was land and 0.012 square miles (0.03 km^{2}), or 1.06%, was water.

== Demographics ==
Historical population
Census	Pop.	Note	%±
1920	992		—
1930	802		−19.2%
1940	748		−6.7%
1950	709		−5.2%
1960	864		21.9%
1970	830		−3.9%
1980	911		9.8%
1990	873		−4.2%
2000	833		−4.6%
2010	793		−4.8%
2020	748		−5.7%
2025 (est.)	705	▼	−5.7%
U.S. Decennial Census

Mooringsport racial and ethnic composition as of 2020
Race and ethnicity	Number	Percentage
White (non-Hispanic)	570	76.2%
Black or African American (non-Hispanic)	93	12.43%
Native American	6	0.8%
Other/Mixed	57	7.62%
Hispanic or Latino	22	2.94%

In 1920, Mooringsport had a historic high of 992 residents; since then, its population has fluctuated to a low of 709 at the 1950 U.S. census, to 911 in 1980. By 2020, there were 748 people, 257 households, and 140 families in Mooringsport. At the 2000 census, there were 833 people, 334 households, and 228 families. The population density was 716.6 inhabitants per square mile (276.7/km^{2}). There were 397 housing units at an average density of 341.5 per square mile (131.9/km^{2}).

Reflecting its historically predominant non-Hispanic white population, the racial makeup was 80.19% White American, 17.77% Black and African American, 0.36% American Indian and Alaska Native, 0.36% from other races, and 1.32% from two or more races in 2000. Hispanic or Latino Americans of any race were 0.72% of the population. At the 2020 census and its nationwide reflection of continued diversification, the racial and ethnic makeup was 76.2% non-Hispanic white, 12.43% Black and African American, 0.8% American Indian and Alaska Native, 7.62% from two or more races, and 2.94% Hispanic or Latino American of any race.

Financially, the median income for a household was $32,177 at the 2000 census. The median income for a family was $40,625. Males had a median income of $29,167 versus $21,875 for females. The per capita income for Mooringsport was $14,589. About 9.8% of families and 10.7% of the population were below the poverty line, including 10.7% of those under age 18 and 14.2% of those age 65 or over. At the 2020 American Community Survey, the median household income declined to $21,346 with a mean income of $33,428. Families had a median household income of $33,438 with a mean of $44,989; married-couple families a median income of $53,542; and non-family households a median income of $17,188.

== Education ==
It is in the Caddo Parish School District.

== Notable people ==
- Sam Caldwell, mayor of Shreveport from 1934–1946, born and reared in Mooringsport
- Earl Holliman, actor, was raised in Mooringsport
- Lead Belly (Huddie William Ledbetter, 1888–1949), singer and guitarist born in Mooringsport
- Mayor of Mooringsport.
