= List of programs broadcast by the NTA Film Network =

This is a list of programs broadcast by the NTA Film Network, an early American television network and syndication service which operated in North America from 1956 to around 1961, when the network's flagship station, WNTA-TV, was sold.

All programs are listed below, whether they were NTA original series or programs only seen in second-run syndication.

Table of affiliate stations
NTA Program	Number of Episodes	Notes
Alex in Wonderland		
Amy Vanderbilt's Etiquette		
Assignment: Underwater	39	
Best of Bishop Sheen	52	
Bill Corum Show	26	
Bobo the Hobo	26	
China Smith	26 (1953); 26 (1955)	
Combat Sergeant	13	
Crime Reporter		
Danger Is My Business		
Design for Living	39	
Divorce Court	130	
Drew Pearson Show		
Find a Hobby	26	
Flash Gordon		
George Jessel's Show Business		
Glencannon		
Grand Jury	39	
Hal Roach Laff Time Show	7	
Hand to Heaven	13	
Health and Happiness Club	105	
Henry Morgan and Company		
Holiday	13	
Hour of Stars		
How to Marry a Millionaire		
International Playhouse	26	
James Mason Show	26	
Janet Dean, RN	39	
Jukebox Jury		
Layman's Call to Prayer	52	
Lilli Palmer Theatre	26	
Mad Whirl	26	
Man From Cochise	156	
Man Without a Gun	52	
Man's Heritage	13 10-min. episodes 1 60-min. episode	
Mantovani	39	
M.D.	39	
Mike Wallace Interview		
Music of the Masters	13	
New Orleans Police Department		
NTA Film Spectacular		
NTA Presents		
NTA Theatre		
Official Detective	39	
Open End		
Orient Express	26	
Oscar Levant Show		
Pantomime Quiz	13	
The Play of the Week	26 (1953); 52 (1959-1960)	
Police Call	26	
Premiere Performance		
Q. T. Hush		
Quality Theatre		
Roller Derby		
Russ Hodges' Scoreboard		
Sheriff of Cochise	78	
Sherlock Holmes	39	
Shirley Temple Specials		
Stu Erwin Show		
The Big Night		
The Passerby	26	
The Third Man	76	
This Is Alice	39	
Theater	26	
TV Playhouse		
U.S. Marshal	78	
William Tell	39	
