= Republic Entertainment (1984–2010) =

Defunct American television syndicator (1954–2010)

Republic Entertainment Inc.
- Formerly: National Telefilm Associates (1954–1984); Republic Pictures Corporation (1984–1994)
- Type: Motion pictures
- Founded: 1954; 72 years ago
- Founder: Ely Landau and Oliver A. Unger
- Defunct: 2010; 16 years ago
- Fate: Folded into Viacom
- Headquarters: Studio City, Los Angeles, California
- Parent: Spelling Entertainment (1994–1999); Viacom (1999–2005; 2005–2010)
- Divisions: Republic Pictures Home Video

Republic Entertainment, Inc. was a distribution company primarily concerned with the syndication of American film libraries to television, including the Republic Pictures catalogue and the National Telefilm Associates (NTA) film library. It was successful enough on cable television between 1983 and 1985 that it renamed itself Republic Pictures and undertook film production and home video sales as well.

== Background ==
=== National Telefilm Associates ===
NTA was founded by Ely Landau and Oliver A. Unger in 1953 when Ely Landau, Inc. was reorganized in partnership with Unger and Harold Goldman. NTA was the successor company to U.M. & M. TV Corporation, which it bought out in 1956. In mid 1956, 20th Century Fox licensed the pre-1948 film library for television distribution, but not the copyrights to National Telefilm Associates.

In October 1956, NTA launched the NTA Film Network, a syndication service which distributed both film and live programs to television stations not affiliated with NBC, CBS, or ABC (DuMont had recently gone out of business). The ad-hoc network's flagship station was WNTA-TV, channel 13 in New York. The NTA Network was launched as a "fourth TV network", and trade papers of the time referred to it as a new television network.

The NTA network launched on October 15, 1956, with over 100 affiliate stations. NTA programming included syndicated programs such as Police Call (1955), How to Marry a Millionaire (1957-1959), The Passerby, Man Without a Gun (1957-1959), and This is Alice (1958). The network also distributed 52 Twentieth Century Fox films in 1956. In November of the same year, it was announced that 50% of the network had been purchased by Fox, which would also produce original content for the network.

In January 1959, Ely Landau was succeeded by Charles C. Barry, who took over as president of network operations. Landau continued to chair National Telefilm Associates. Bernard Tabakin became the president of National Telefilms Associates in 1962 and retained that position until 1975. During his tenure, NTA became the largest independent television distributor in the industry and acquired various film libraries, including NBC Films and Republic Pictures.

Despite the 50% ownership of 20th Century Fox, the film network never developed into a major commercial television network on a par with the "Big Three" television networks; modern TV historians regard the NTA Film Network as a syndication service rather than a major television network.

In March 1973, NTA bought NBC Films, the syndication arm of the NBC television network since March 1953 for $7.5 million, after the FCC ruled TV networks could not syndicate their own shows. Notable titles include Bonanza, The High Chaparral, Car 54, Where Are You?, Kimba the White Lion and Get Smart.

Like its U.M. & M. predecessor, NTA altered the original negatives to the Paramount black-and-white animated shorts, replacing the front-and-end titles. References to Paramount and Technicolor were blacked out, with the NTA logo replacing the Paramount mountain.

At the end of color prints, the NTA logo had a U.M. & M. copyright byline below it, but on black-and-white prints, the U.M. & M. copyright appeared where the original Paramount copyright had been.

On some shorts, either the original Paramount copyright line, the original color process line, the "Paramount Presents" line, or even part of the Paramount logo could still be seen for a few frames before the black bars appear. On two Noveltoons featuring Little Audrey, the "spinning star" portion of the Paramount opening could still be seen. On the Little Lulu cartoons altered by NTA, they had no choice but to leave in the last part of the Paramount opening, albeit with much of it blacked out, since the "Little Lulu by Marge from The Saturday Evening Post" title card appeared over the Paramount mountain. In addition, most Betty Boop cartoons made between 1932 and 1934 utilize the Paramount mountain (minus the stars and typeface) as a backdrop for the main titles, with even a select few keeping the original copyright byline. However, when NTA repackaged many of those same cartoons in the 1970s, the original titles were kept without black bars, but the opening and ending Paramount logos were replaced with a contemporary NTA logo (the design taken from NTA predecessor Commonwealth United). At the same time, the Fleischer Studios feature Gulliver's Travels, as well as a small number of short subjects have circulated with their original Paramount titles.

Following Warner Bros.'s example of having their black-and-white cartoons colorized in 1968, NTA also sent the Betty Boop cartoons to South Korea in the early 1970s to be redrawn in color in order to become more marketable in the wake of color TV.

By 1982, NTA had launched a home video division called NTA Home Entertainment to market its holdings on VHS and Betamax, after its original contract with The Nostalgia Merchant ended. NTA previously licensed several of the titles for videocassette to The Nostalgia Merchant. Two labels, Spotlite Video, releasing video cassettes of public domain material and documentaries, and Inspiration Video, which released Christian/faith content was also established.

=== Republic Pictures Corporation ===
Following the immense success of their syndication of the Republic Pictures catalogue to cable television, National Telefilm Associates announced on December 28, 1984, that they had acquired the logos, copyrights, and trademarks of Republic Pictures Corporation and effectively renamed themselves as such. A television production unit was set up under the Republic name and offered, among other things, off-network repeats of the CBS series Beauty and the Beast and game show Press Your Luck in syndication. There were also a few theatrical films, including Freeway, Ruby in Paradise, Dark Horse, Live Nude Girls, and Bound. At the same time, subsidiary NTA Home Entertainment was renamed Republic Pictures Home Video and began remarketing the original Republic film library. In 1985, the company bought out Blackhawk Films, and eventually, Republic decided to close Blackhawk in 1987.

Also that year, Republic Pictures Home Video, the home video division of Republic Pictures, had signed an agreement with Hawk Company, headed by Robert Clouse, in order to gain access to 31 projects that were developed by Hawk, for home video release, and that Republic Pictures Home Video received a 24% share in the newly formed Hawk Company organization.

On August 27, 1986, Republic Pictures Home Video established a venture with Eagle Productions Ltd. that Eagle would produce family-oriented outdoors programming, and that Republic Pictures Home Video would handle sales, marketing, and distribution of the Eagle Productions titles, with the venture The Eagle Heritage Video Collection is aimed at the interest of hunting, fishing and other "non-consumptive" uses of the outdoors. In 1987, Republic Pictures decided to expand onto its television production activities, in association with Jaffe/Lansing Productions, on a television movie for ABC, which is When the Time Comes, plus two prospective projects for CBS, which are Indiscreet, and Mistress, which was part of a three-picture deal between Jaffe/Lansing and Republic Pictures. That year, Chuck Larsen was hired by Republic Pictures as president of domestic television distribution, and will select the two from a number of series we have in development.

==== Republic Entertainment Inc. ====
In January 1993, Blockbuster Entertainment announced they would purchase a 35% stake in Republic. In June, the company's home video division signed a deal with the Children's Television Workshop for the release of several of the company's properties on VHS in order for the former to expand to the children's video market; however, videos tied to the CTW's flagship series Sesame Street were not included due to a preexisting deal with Random House Home Video that eventually expired two years later. Later on in the year, the company used the landmark legal decision Stewart v. Abend in order to reactivate the copyright on Frank Capra's 1946 RKO film It's a Wonderful Life (under NTA, it had already acquired the film's negative, music score, and the story on which it was based, "The Greatest Gift"). On September 14, following Blockbuster's purchase of a 48.2% stake in Aaron Spelling's Spelling Entertainment, Spelling announced that they would enter into a $100 million purchase and merger with Republic Pictures Corporation, which would close at the end of January 1994. The deal was closed on April 27, 1994, with Republic Pictures Corporation becoming a fully owned subsidiary of Spelling Entertainment and was renamed Republic Entertainment Inc.

Following Blockbuster Entertainment's merger with Viacom on September 29, 1994, Blockbuster by then owned 67% of Spelling Entertainment and Republic. At the end of the year, Spelling's existing home video division, Worldvision Home Video, was merged with Republic Pictures Home Video and took the latter name.

In 1996, Republic shut down its film production unit. In September 1997, Republic's video rental operations were taken over by Paramount Home Video; although its sell-through operations remained.

In September 1998, Spelling announced that they would license the American and Canadian video rights to the Republic Pictures library to Artisan Entertainment, and would continue to be released with the Republic Pictures brand and logo. Overseas, Spelling licensed out the library to distributors such as PolyGram Video/Universal Pictures Video in the United Kingdom.

By the end of the decade, Viacom bought the portion of Spelling it did not own previously; thus, Republic became a wholly owned division of Paramount Pictures. Artisan (later sold to Lionsgate Home Entertainment) continued to use the Republic name, logo, and library under license from Paramount. Republic Pictures' holdings consist of a catalog of 3,000 films and TV series, including the original Republic library (except for the Roy Rogers and Gene Autry catalogs, owned by their respective estates) and inherited properties from NTA and Aaron Spelling.

In 2012, Richard Feiner & Co. sued Paramount for the unauthorized exploitation of 17 films from the 1940s and 50s originally released by Warner Bros. which Feiner had previously acquired. Feiner sold Republic Pictures the "rights, and interest of every kind, nature, and description throughout the Universe" to the films in 1986, but retained the license to exploit the films in major U.S. markets (New York, Atlanta, Los Angeles, Philadelphia, etc.). The plaintiff claimed that the films aired on cable several times without their knowledge. The case was later settled, with Feiner now sharing in the royalties.

Republic Entertainment Inc. has since been folded by Paramount, who later formed a holding company called Melange Pictures for the Republic library, logos and brand. After Lionsgate's domestic deal with Paramount expired, Paramount signed new deals with Olive Films and Kino Lorber to distribute the Republic Library. As before, the Republic brand and logo continue to be used by both companies under license.

== Library ==
The Melange Pictures library includes:

- Most of the pre-1949 films produced by 20th Century Fox (these would later revert to Fox through their own TV division; as NTA held only a license to distribute, while Fox retained ownership)
- Most of Paramount's short film library, including the Fleischer Studios and pre-October 1950 Famous Studios cartoons (excluding Popeye the Sailor and Superman), Puppetoons, and the live-action comedies, musicals, and novelties (Burns and Allen, Robert Benchley, Eddie Cantor, Rudy Vallee, Louis Armstrong, Mack Sennett comedies, Hedda Hopper's Hollywood, etc.), excluding all Jerry Fairbanks-produced short films
- Select films produced by Monogram Pictures and Allied Artists Pictures Corporation (post-1938)
- Part of the pre-1952 United Artists library (those films whose rights did not revert to their original producers)
- The Frank Capra film It's a Wonderful Life by Liberty Films and RKO Radio Pictures
- Leo McCarey's Rainbow Productions (The Bells of St. Mary's and Good Sam) This sale in October 1956 also included Gulliver's Travels and Mr. Bug Goes to Town, both produced by Fleischer Studios
- Enterprise Productions catalog (Body and Soul, Arch of Triumph, Force of Evil, Caught, etc.)
- A number of reissued films from Budd Rogers Releasing Corporation (The Dark Mirror, Magic Town, A Double Life, Secret Beyond the Door, and Mr. Peabody and the Mermaid)
- The library of Richard Feiner & Company, including the pre-1960 United States Pictures catalog
- The 1947 film The Lost Moment released by Universal Pictures
- In the early 1970s, Cary Grant licensed television distribution rights to several of his films, most of them independently produced by his company, to NTA for $2 million including royalties. These films included Penny Serenade, Indiscreet, Operation Petticoat, The Grass is Greener, That Touch of Mink, and Father Goose.
- Select films produced by Landau Company
- The film library of Bank of America
- Most films from NTA's sub-division Commonwealth United Entertainment
- The original Republic Pictures library (NTA had acquired Republic's catalog after that company ceased production in 1957)
- 30 films by Robert L. Lippert's Regal Films that were released by 20th Century Fox
- WNTA-AM-FM-TV, licensed to Newark, New Jersey. WNTA-TV served the New York City television market, broadcasting on Channel 13 beginning in 1958. The stations were previously WAAT AM 970, WAAT-FM 94.7 and WATV. A notable WNTA-TV production syndicated to other commercial stations was the dramatic anthology series, The Play of the Week. NTA shut down its TV station in late 1961, selling its license in 1962 to Educational Broadcasting Corporation, which reappeared in September 1962 as noncommercial WNDT and eventually WNET, the primary PBS outlet for the greater New York area. The radio stations were sold as well; they currently operate as WNYM AM 970 and WXBK 94.7 FM.

== Sources ==
- "14 Franchise Holders as Regional Distribs for Landau's NTA Vidpix". Variety. Vol. 193, no. 6. January 13, 1954. pp. 26, 32.
- "Barry Named President of NTA Film Network". Boxoffice. Vol. 74, no. 14. January 26, 1959. p. 17.
- "Bernard Tabakin". Variety. August 13, 1997. Archived from the original on May 29, 2016.
- "Blockbuster's Spelling Finishes Buying Republic". Orlando Sentinel. August 2, 2012 [1994-04-28].
- "Fourth TV Network, For Films, Is Created". Boxoffice. Vol. 69, no. 11. July 7, 1956. p. 8.
- "Fox Buys Into TV Network; Makes 390 Features Available". Boxoffice. Vol. 70, no. 2. November 3, 1956. p. 8.
- "Martin Ross Here Seeking Telefilms for Nat'l Distrib'n". Variety. Vol. 80, no. 35. July 24, 1953. p. 11.
- "National Telefilm leases Fox movies, buys UM&M in $6 million plus deals" (PDF). Broadcasting. May 21, 1956. p. 52.
- "NTA Scratches Nostalgia Pact, Getting Into Own Homevid Retail Setup". Variety. Vol. 311, no. 3. May 18, 1983. p. 34.
- "Oliver Unger Quits NTA; Charles Glett Successor". Boxoffice. Vol. 79, no. 6. May 29, 1961. p. 15 – via Internet Archive.
- "Repub Pix Hires Chuck Larsen As Domestic TV Prez". Variety. Vol. 327, no. 11. July 8, 1987. pp. 57, 73.
- "Republic & Eagle In A Joint Prod.-Distrib Plan For Outdoor Pics". Variety. Vol. 324, no. 5. August 27, 1986. p. 32.
- "Republic Pictures' Eagle Flies Again". Los Angeles Times. Associated Press. January 8, 1985. ISSN 0458-3035.
- "Republic Pix HV Gains Access to 31 Projects Via Hawk Co. Contract". Variety. Vol. 321, no. 3. November 13, 1985. p. 41.
- "Republic Fires Up TV Production Unit". Variety. Vol. 326, no. 8. March 18, 1987. p. 47.
- "Richard FEINER v. PARAMOUNT – 95 A.D.3d 232 (2012) – 20120405321". Leagle. 2012.
- "Sale of NBC Films completes exodus of networks from syndication" (PDF). Broadcasting. February 12, 1973.
- "Spelling Entertainment, Republic Pictures in Merger". AP News. September 13, 1993. Archived from the original on March 29, 2023.
- "Spelling Will Acquire Republic Pictures Corp". Deseret News. September 19, 1993. Archived from the original on June 14, 2025 – via New York Times News Service.
- "Viacom Completes Merger With Blockbuster". techagreements.com. Archived from the original on June 17, 2015.
- Bates, James (January 22, 1993). "Blockbuster Will Buy 35% Stake in Republic Pictures". Los Angeles Times.
- Bates, James (June 30, 1993). "Republic Pictures to Distribute Children's Videos". Los Angeles Times.
- Carver, Benedict (September 9, 1998). "Artisan to distrib Republic". Variety.
- Elliot, Mark (2004). Cary Grant: a biography. New York: Three Rivers Press. ISBN 0-307-20983-0. LCCN 2004052023.
- Fitzpatrick, Eileen (September 6, 1997). "Spelling Ends Republic's Rentals; 'Hercules' On Hold". Billboard. Vol. 109, no. 36. p. 96 – via Google Books.
- Fitzpatrick, Eileen (September 26, 1998). "Artisan Lands Spelling Deal; Blockbuster Unveils DVD Plans". Billboard. Vol. 110, no. 39. p. 137 – via Google Books.
- Gardner, Eriq (April 24, 2012). "Paramount Gets Mixed Rulings in Legal Cases Over 'La Dolce Vita,' 'Johnny Come Lately.'". The Hollywood Reporter.
- Golembiewski, Dick (2008). Milwaukee Television History: The Analog Years. Marquette University Press. pp. 280–281. ISBN 978-0-87462-055-9.
- Lichtman, Irv (May 28, 1994). "The Billboard Bulletin... Robert Sigman Gets Official Nod". Billboard. Vol. 106, no. 22. p. 82 – via Google Books.
- Lippman, John (March 9, 1993). "Blockbuster to Buy Stake in Spelling: Entertainment: Pushing further into Hollywood, the video store chain will acquire 48.2% in a $141.3-million deal". Los Angeles Times.
- Lumenick, Lou (May 14, 2013). "DVD Extra: Fred MacMurray's cynical Hollywood press agent gets religion, with help from Valli, Frank Sinatra and Ben Hecht". New York Post.
- Rothman, Matt (January 22, 1993). "Blockbuster gets 35% stake in Republic Pix". Variety.
- Spielman, Bob (August 18, 1956). "Dozens of Questions Marks Blur Road Signs of TV Films' Future". Billboard Magazine. Vol. 68, no. 33. pp. 28–9 – via Google Books.
- Sventon, Argus (n.d.). "U.M. & M. and NTA, a brief history". Archived from the original on August 6, 2009.
