= List of NTA Film Network affiliates in the United States =

Between July 1956 to around November 1961, the National Telefilm Associates (NTA) operated the NTA Film Network, an early television network and syndication service that operated in the United States and Canada. The organization had syndicated television programs to individual stations since the early 1950s. The film network effort was an attempt to launch a viable "fourth television network" that would compete directly with CBS, NBC, and ABC, the three largest television networks in the United States. Although the program service was intended to attract independent television stations, many CBS, NBC, and ABC affiliates also aired NTA programs.

Between 1956 and 1961, NTA offered dozens of programs to affiliated stations. Some popular television series, such as How to Marry a Millionaire, Premiere Performance, Sheriff of Cochise, and The Third Man, each aired on over 100 local television stations. Other NTA programs were never widely seen; for example, after its first few months on the air, Alex in Wonderland aired on just one TV station. Station managers were free to choose which programs they would air, and no television station aired NTA's complete program line-up. Even NTA's three owned-and-operated stations (O&Os), WNTA-TV in New York, KMSP-TV in Minneapolis, and WDAF-TV in Kansas City, "cherry-picked" programs.

As a way of assuring widespread viewership of its programs, NTA sold series to any television station that would air them. This angered station managers who had already signed affiliation agreements with the NTA Film Network, and led to NTA programs being aired on several television stations in the same city. NTA also purposely double-booked or triple-booked some programs to guarantee higher ratings. For example, in New York City, How to Marry a Millionaire aired on three different area stations at the same time. This distribution method led to large numbers of stations airing some NTA offerings — by one estimate 370 stations in 1957.

Many NTA Film Network series were filmed in Hollywood or England; some later NTA programs were videotaped in New York. The film or tape medium of the recordings allowed local station owners to fill in empty spots in their schedules using NTA programs, and allowed the company to re-run its programs years after program production had ceased. NTA attempted to establish a standardized network schedule in 1958, but only 17 local stations agreed to air NTA programs in pattern (during the set time). Although NTA announced provisional plans to telecast sporting and special events over a live network, the network remained distributed almost entirely on film. One notable exception, the public affairs program Open End, was broadcast live from New York City to a network of 10 stations; the rest of the affiliates received the program on videotape.

Although NTA's program service was fairly popular, occasionally attracting up to 22 percent of the viewing audience, the NTA Film Network was never a serious competitor to the "Big Three" television networks. The company had only three O&Os, while the larger networks had five apiece. Executives considered purchasing KTVR in Denver and WITI in Milwaukee, but those stations were never acquired. NTA and its parent company sold the Minneapolis station in November 1959, the Kansas City station in August 1960, and its flagship New York City station in November 1961. NTA continued syndication services even after its flagship station was sold, however, and a few new television series debuted between 1961 and 1965. NTA also re-ran its older filmed programs during this era.

All affiliate television stations are listed below, whether they carried many NTA programs or only a single series. Television stations listed here aired NTA programs between the launch of the network in 1956 and the end of the 1961–1962 television season. (Note: Pantomime Quiz aired on CBS, NBC, DuMont, and ABC between 1950 and 1956. NTA acquired the distribution rights to Pantomime Quiz by 1957. However, both CBS and ABC continued to broadcast episodes of the series between 1957 and 1963. For this reason, stations airing Pantomime Quiz are not listed here.)

== Stations ==
Table of affiliate stations
City	State or Territory	Call sign	Channel	Programs aired
Aberdeen	South Dakota	KXAB-TV	9	Glencannon; Premiere Performance
Abilene	Texas	KRBC-TV	9	Sheriff of Cochise
Ada	Oklahoma	KTEN*	10	China Smith; Combat Sergeant; How to Marry a Millionaire; NTA Film Spectacular; Orient Express; Police Call; Premiere Performance; This is Alice
Albany	New York	WTRI	35/13	Best of Bishop Sheen; Hour of Stars; How to Marry a Millionaire; Man Without a Gun; NTA Film Spectacular; Premiere Performance; Shirley Temple Specials; This is Alice
Albuquerque	New Mexico	KGGM-TV	13	Hour of Stars; NTA Film Spectacular; Official Detective; Orient Express; Premiere Performance; Sheriff of Cochise
Albuquerque	New Mexico	KOAT-TV	7	Hour of Stars; How to Marry a Millionaire; Janet Dean, RN (Note: Janet Dean, RN was distributed by UM&M from 1954 to 1955. NTA had acquired distribution rights by 1956. Only the airings after June 1956 are listed here.); Man Without a Gun; New Orleans Police Dept. This is Alice; U.S. Marshal
Albuquerque	New Mexico	KOB-TV	4	Assignment: Underwater; Combat Sergeant; Danger is My Business; Lilli Palmer Theater; Mike Wallace Interview (Note: Mike Wallace Interview was broadcast by ABC from 1957 to 1958. NTA aired the program from 1959 to 1961. Only the NTA airings are listed here.); Sheriff of Cochise; The Third Man; U.S. Marshal
Alexandria	Louisiana	KALB-TV	5	Danger is My Business; Glencannon; Official Detective; Sheriff of Cochise; William Tell
Alexandria	Minnesota	KCMT-TV	7	Grand Jury; Sheriff of Cochise; The Third Man
Allentown	Pennsylvania	WGLV*	57	NTA Film Spectacular
Amarillo	Texas	KFDA-TV	10	Hour of Stars; How to Marry a Millionaire; Man Without a Gun; Sheriff of Cochise; The Third Man; This is Alice; U.S. Marshal
Amarillo	Texas	KGNC-TV	4	Danger is My Business; Premiere Performance; Sheriff of Cochise
Amarillo	Texas	KVII-TV	7	The Big Night; Combat Sergeant; Man's Heritage; Official Detective
Anchorage	Alaska	KTVA*‡	11	NTA Film Spectacular
Asheville	North Carolina	WLOS*	13	Best of Bishop Sheen; Combat Sergeant; Hour of Stars; How to Marry a Millionaire; Man Without a Gun; NTA Film Spectacular; NTA Theatre; Official Detective; Premiere Performance; Sheriff of Cochise; Shirley Temple Specials; This is Alice
Atlanta	Georgia	WAGA-TV*	5	China Smith; Combat Sergeant; Danger is My Business; Divorce Court; Hour of Stars; NTA Film Spectacular; Police Call; Premiere Performance; Orient Express; The Third Man; U.S. Marshal
Atlanta	Georgia	WLWA	11	Assignment: Underwater; Grand Jury; Hour of Stars; How to Marry a Millionaire; Man Without a Gun; Official Detective; This is Alice
Atlanta	Georgia	WSB-TV	2	Glencannon; Janet Dean, RN; Man Without a Gun; Play of the Week; Sheriff of Cochise
Augusta	Georgia	WJBF	6	Assignment: Underwater; China Smith; How to Marry a Millionaire; This is Alice
Augusta	Georgia	WRDW-TV	12	Man Without a Gun; New Orleans Police Dept. The Third Man; U.S. Marshal; William Tell
Austin	Minnesota	KGLO-TV	3	Sheriff of Cochise; The Third Man
Austin	Minnesota	KMMT-TV*	6	China Smith; Combat Sergeant; Hour of Stars; How to Marry a Millionaire; International Playhouse; James Mason; Man Without a Gun; NTA Film Spectacular; Orient Express; The Passerby; Play of the Week; Premiere Performance
Austin	Texas	KTBC	7	Official Detective; The Third Man; U.S. Marshal
Bakersfield	California	KERO-TV*	10	Assignment: Underwater; NTA Film Spectacular; Official Detective; Sheriff of Cochise; The Third Man; U.S. Marshal
Bakersfield	California	KBAK-TV	29	Danger is My Business; Glencannon; Man From Cochise
Bakersfield	California	KLYD-TV	17	Grand Jury; Hour of Stars; Man Without a Gun; U.S. Marshal
Baltimore	Maryland	WBAL-TV	11	Play of the Week; Sheriff of Cochise
Baltimore	Maryland	WJZ-TV	13	Danger is My Business
Baltimore	Maryland	WMAR-TV	2	Bobo the Hobo; Hour of Stars; How to Marry a Millionaire; Man Without a Gun; NTA Film Spectacular; Premiere Performance; This is Alice
Bangor	Maine	WABI-TV*	5	China Smith; Combat Sergeant; How to Marry a Millionaire; NTA Film Spectacular; Police Call; Play of the Week; Premiere Performance; Sheriff of Cochise
Baton Rouge	Louisiana	WAFB-TV	28/9	China Smith; Glencannon; Premiere Performance; Sheriff of Cochise
Baton Rouge	Louisiana	WBRZ-TV	9	How to Marry a Millionaire; Man Without a Gun; This is Alice
Bay City	Michigan	WNEM-TV	5	Man Without a Gun; NTA Film Spectacular; This is Alice
Beaumont	Texas	KFDM-TV	6	Hour of Stars; How to Marry a Millionaire; Man Without a Gun; This is Alice
Beaumont	Texas	KPAC-TV	4	Hour of Stars
Bellingham	Washington	KVOS-TV	12	Sheriff of Cochise
Big Spring	Texas	KBST/ KEDY-TV	4	Hour of Stars; How to Marry a Millionaire; Man Without a Gun; NTA Film Spectacular; Official Detective; Sheriff of Cochise
Billings	Montana	KGHL-TV	8	Assignment: Underwater; Danger is My Business; How to Marry a Millionaire; Mantovani; Official Detective; The Third Man; This is Alice
Billings	Montana	KOOK-TV	2	Man Without a Gun; Sheriff of Cochise
Billings	Montana	KXLJ/ KBLL-TV	12	Grand Jury
Binghamton	New York	WNBF-TV	12	NTA Film Spectacular
Birmingham	Alabama	WAPI-TV	13	Danger is My Business
Birmingham	Alabama	WBRC*	6	China Smith; Man Without a Gun; NTA Film Spectacular; Premiere Performance; Sheriff of Cochise; The Third Man; U.S. Marshal
Bismarck	North Dakota	KBMB-TV*	12	China Smith; NTA Film Spectacular; Orient Express; The Passerby; Play of the Week; Police Call
Bismarck	North Dakota	KFYR-TV	5	Man Without a Gun; Sheriff of Cochise; This is Alice
Bloomington	Indiana	WTTV	4	Alex in Wonderland; Best of Bishop Sheen; China Smith; Danger is My Business; Divorce Court; Henry Morgan and Co. Janet Dean, RN; Mike Wallace Interviews; Official Detective; Open End (Note: The December 6, 1960, episode of Open End aired on NBC. Stations airing this broadcast are not listed here.) The Passerby; Play of the Week
Bluefield	West Virginia	WHIS-TV	6	U.S. Marshal
Boise	Idaho	KBOI-TV	2	Play of the Week
Boston	Massachusetts	WBZ-TV	4	Assignment: Underwater; Best of Bishop Sheen; China Smith; Divorce Court; Glencannon; How to Marry a Millionaire; Juke Box Jury; NTA Film Spectacular; Play of the Week; Premiere Performance
Boston	Massachusetts	WGBH-TV†	2	Open End
Boston	Massachusetts	WHDH-TV	5	Best of Bishop Sheen; Danger is My Business; Divorce Court; Glencannon; Juke Box Jury; This is Alice; William Tell
Boston	Massachusetts	WNAC-TV	7	Combat Sergeant; Flash Gordon (Note: Flash Gordon was distributed by UM&M in 1955. By 1956, NTA distributed the series in some markets, while Guild Films distributed it in others. Only NTA-distributed broadcasts are listed here.) Janet Dean, RN; Sheriff of Cochise; Sherlock Holmes; The Third Man; U.S. Marshal
Bristol	Virginia	WCYB-TV	5	How to Marry a Millionaire
Bryan	Texas	KBTX-TV	3	The Third Man
Buffalo	New York	WBEN-TV	4	Grand Jury; Play of the Week; Sheriff of Cochise; William Tell
Buffalo	New York	WGR-TV	2	Best of Bishop Sheen; Danger is My Business; Man Without a Gun; NTA Film Spectacular; Official Detective; Sheriff of Cochise; The Third Man
Buffalo	New York	WKBW-TV	7	How to Marry a Millionaire; Man Without a Gun; This is Alice
Buffalo	New York	WNED-TV	17	Open End
Burlington	Vermont	WCAX-TV	3	Glencannon; Hour of Stars
Cape Girardeau	Missouri	KFVS-TV	12	Grand Jury; Hour of Stars; U.S. Marshal
Carbondale	Illinois	WSIL-TV	3	Hour of Stars; Official Detective; The Third Man; William Tell
Carlsbad	New Mexico	KAVE-TV*‡	6	NTA Film Spectacular
Cedar Rapids	Iowa	KCRG-TV	9	Crime Reporter; Danger is My Business; Official Detective
Cedar Rapids	Iowa	WMT-TV	2	Grand Jury; Sheriff of Cochise; The Third Man; U.S. Marshal
Champaign	Illinois	WCIA	3	Grand Jury; How to Marry a Millionaire; NTA Film Spectacular; Sheriff of Cochise
Charleston	West Virginia	WCHS-TV*	8	Hour of Stars; How to Marry a Millionaire; NTA Film Spectacular; Official Detective; This is Alice
Charleston	South Carolina	WUSN-TV*	2	China Smith; Divorce Court; Hour of Stars; How to Marry a Millionaire; International Playhouse; Man Without a Gun; NTA Film Spectacular; Orient Express; Police Call; Premiere Performance; This is Alice; U.S. Marshal
Charlotte	North Carolina	WBTV	3	Sheriff of Cochise; U.S. Marshal
Charlotte	North Carolina	WSOC-TV	9	The Third Man
Chattanooga	Tennessee	WDEF-TV*	12	NTA Film Spectacular; Premiere Performance; Sheriff of Cochise
Chicago	Illinois	WBKB-TV	7	Best of Bishop Sheen; Combat Sergeant; Janet Dean, RN; U.S. Marshal
Chicago	Illinois	WGN-TV*	9	Assignment: Underwater; China Smith; Combat Sergeant; Danger is My Business; Divorce Court; Hour of Stars; How to Marry a Millionaire; Man Without a Gun; New Orleans Police Dept. NTA Film Spectacular; Official Detective; Play of the Week; Premiere Performance; Sherlock Holmes; Stu Irwin; The Third Man; This is Alice; U.S. Marshal; William Tell
Chicago	Illinois	WTTW	11	Open End
Chico	California	KHSL-TV	12	Glencannon; Danger is My Business
Cincinnati	Ohio	WCPO-TV	9	Flash Gordon; Hour of Stars; Lilli Palmer Theater; Man Without a Gun; This is Alice
Cincinnati	Ohio	WKRC-TV*	12	Janet Dean, RN; NTA Film Spectacular; Premiere Performance; Sheriff of Cochise
Cincinnati	Ohio	WLWT	5	Man From Cochise; Sheriff of Cochise
Clarksburg	West Virginia	WBOY-TV	12	William Tell
Cleveland	Ohio	KYW-TV	3	Open End; Sheriff of Cochise; William Tell
Cleveland	Ohio	WEWS-TV	5	Assignment: Underwater; Best of Bishop Sheen; Bobo the Hobo; China Smith; Combat Sergeant; Find a Hobby; Glencannon; Hour of Stars; How to Marry a Millionaire; International Playhouse; James Mason; Man Without a Gun; Orient Express; The Passerby; Play of the Week; Police Call; Stu Irwin; Sheriff of Cochise; The Third Man; This is Alice; U.S. Marshal; William Tell
Cleveland	Ohio	WJW-TV*	8	Drew Pearson; Divorce Court; NTA Film Spectacular; Premiere Performance
Colorado Springs	Colorado	KCSJ-TV	5	Crime Reporter
Colorado Springs	Colorado	KKTV	11	Sheriff of Cochise; The Third Man
Columbia	Missouri	KOMU-TV	8	China Smith; Drew Pearson; Grand Jury; Hour of Stars; How to Marry a Millionaire; Man Without a Gun; Sherlock Holmes; The Third Man; This is Alice; U.S. Marshal
Columbia	South Carolina	WIS	10	Danger is My Business; Sheriff of Cochise; The Third Man; U.S. Marshal
Columbus	Georgia	WDAK-TV/WTVM*	28	NTA Film Spectacular
Columbus	Ohio	WBNS-TV	10	Man From Cochise; Sheriff of Cochise; Stu Irwin; This is Alice
Columbus	Ohio	WLWC	4	Assignment: Underwater; Best of Bishop Sheen; Danger is My Business; Grand Jury; Man Without a Gun; Official Detective
Columbus	Ohio	WTVN-TV*	6	China Smith; Glencannon; Hour of Stars; How to Marry a Millionaire; Man Without a Gun; NTA Film Spectacular; Premiere Performance; Sheriff of Cochise; U.S. Marshal
Columbus	Mississippi	WCBI-TV*	4	NTA Film Spectacular
Coos Bay	Oregon	KCBY-TV	11	How to Marry a Millionaire; U.S. Marshal
Corpus Christi	Texas	KRIS-TV	6	Sheriff of Cochise; U.S. Marshal
Corpus Christi	Texas	KVDO-TV	22	China Smith; Police Call; Sherlock Holmes
Corpus Christi	Texas	KZTV	10	Janet Dean, RN; U.S. Marshal
Dallas	Texas	KFJZ-TV/ KTVT-TV*‡	11	Assignment: Underwater; Divorce Court; Hour of Stars; How to Marry a Millionaire; Juke Box Jury; Man Without a Gun; Mike Wallace Interview; NTA Film Spectacular; Premiere Performance; Sheriff of Cochise; Sherlock Holmes; The Third Man; This is Alice; U.S. Marshal
Dallas	Texas	KRLD-TV	4	Janet Dean, RN; Man Without a Gun; New Orleans Police Dept.
Dallas	Texas	WBAP-TV	5	Danger is My Business; Premiere Performance
Dallas	Texas	WFAA-TV	8	Best of Bishop Sheen; China Smith; Combat Sergeant; Danger is My Business; Hour of Stars; Orient Express; Police Call; Sheriff of Cochise; U.S. Marshal
Dayton	Ohio	WHIO-TV	7	Assignment: Underwater; Grand Jury; Man Without a Gun; Police Call; This is Alice
Dayton	Ohio	WLWD	2	Danger is My Business; NTA Film Spectacular; Premiere Performance; Sheriff of Cochise
Davenport	Iowa	WOC-TV	6	Grand Jury; The Third Man; U.S. Marshal
Decatur	Illinois	WTVP-TV*	17	Mike Wallace Interview; NTA Film Spectacular
Decatur	Alabama	WMSL-TV*	23	NTA Film Spectacular
Denver	Colorado	KBTV	9	Best of Bishop Sheen; How to Marry a Millionaire; Man Without a Gun; Official Detective; This is Alice
Denver	Colorado	KLZ-TV	7	Divorce Court; Juke Box Jury; Sheriff of Cochise
Denver	Colorado	KOA-TV	4	Glencannon; Grand Jury; Play of the Week; U.S. Marshal
Denver	Colorado	KRMA	6	Open End
Denver	Colorado	KTVR*	2	NTA Film Spectacular; Premiere Performance
Des Moines	Iowa	KRNT-TV	8	Sheriff of Cochise
Des Moines	Iowa	WHO-TV	13	Grand Jury; Official Detective; Sheriff of Cochise; The Third Man; U.S. Marshal
Des Moines	Iowa	WOI-TV*	5	China Smith; Combat Sergeant; Hour of Stars; How to Marry a Millionaire; Janet Dean, RN; Man Without a Gun; NTA Film Spectacular; Open End; Play of the Week; Premiere Performance; This is Alice; William Tell
Detroit	Michigan	WJBK-TV	2	Assignment: Underwater; Divorce Court; Grand Jury
Detroit	Michigan	WWJ-TV	4	Sheriff of Cochise; U.S. Marshal
Dickinson	North Dakota	KDIX-TV*	2	Bill Corum Show; China Smith; International Playhouse; Lilli Palmer Theater; Mad Whirl; Man's Heritage; MD; NTA Film Spectacular; Orient Express; Police Call
Dothan	Alabama	WTVY*‡	9	NTA Film Spectacular
Duluth	Minnesota	KDAL-TV*	3	Grand Jury; Hour of Stars; How to Marry a Millionaire; NTA Film Spectacular; Premiere Performance; Sheriff of Cochise; The Third Man; This is Alice; U.S. Marshal
Duluth	Minnesota	WDSM-TV	6	How to Marry a Millionaire; Man Without a Gun; This is Alice
Durham	New Hampshire	WENH-TV	11	Open End
Eau Claire	Wisconsin	WEAU-TV*	13	Bill Corum Show; China Smith; Grand Jury; How to Marry a Millionaire; James Mason; Mantovani; Man Without a Gun; NTA Film Spectacular; Official Detective; Orient Express; Play of the Week; Premiere Performance
Eau Claire	Wisconsin	WKBT-TV	8	Assignment: Underwater; Glencannon; Grand Jury; Hour of Stars; Mantovani; Sheriff of Cochise; The Third Man; This is Alice; U.S. Marshal
Evansville	Indiana	WTVW	7	Assignment: Underwater; Grand Jury; Janet Dean, RN
El Dorado	Arkansas	KRBB-TV/ KTVE	10	China Smith; NTA Film Spectacular; Orient Express; Sheriff of Cochise
El Paso	Texas	KELP-TV	13	Best of Bishop Sheen; Janet Dean, RN; Sheriff of Cochise; The Third Man; This is Alice; William Tell
El Paso	Texas	KROD-TV*‡	4	China Smith; Glencannon; Grand Jury; How to Marry a Millionaire; Man Without a Gun; Man's Heritage; NTA Film Spectacular; Orient Express; Police Call; Premiere Performance; Sheriff of Cochise; This is Alice
El Paso	Texas	KTSM-TV	9	Danger is My Business; Man Without a Gun; Official Detective
Erie	Pennsylvania	WICU	12	Best of Bishop Sheen; Hour of Stars; Sheriff of Cochise
Eugene	Oregon	KVAL-TV	13	How to Marry a Millionaire; U.S. Marshal
Eugene	Oregon	KEZI	9	This is Alice
Eureka	California	KIEM-TV	3	Shirley Temple Specials
Fairbanks	Alaska	KFAR-TV	2	Glencannon; Hour of Stars
Fairbanks	Alaska	KTVF*‡	11	Best of Bishop Sheen; Bill Corum Show; China Smith; Holiday; International Playhouse; Janet Dean, RN; NTA Film Spectacular; Orient Express; The Passerby; Play of the Week; Police Call; Premiere Performance; Sheriff of Cochise; Sherlock Holmes
Fargo	North Dakota	KXJB-TV*	4	Bill Corum Show; China Smith; Glencannon; NTA Film Spectacular
Fargo	North Dakota	WDAY-TV	6	U.S. Marshal
Florence	South Dakota	KDLO-TV	3	China Smith; Sheriff of Cochise; U.S. Marshal
Fort Myers	Florida	WINK-TV	11	Man Without a Gun
Fort Wayne	Indiana	WINT-TV/ WANE-TV*	15	Best of Bishop Sheen; How to Marry a Millionaire; Man Without a Gun; NTA Film Spectacular; Police Call; Premiere Performance
Fort Wayne	Indiana	WKJG-TV	33	Janet Dean, RN; Sheriff of Cochise
Fort Wayne	Indiana	WPTA	21	Hour of Stars; Man From Cochise; Shirley Temple Specials
Fort Smith	Arkansas	KFSA-TV	5	Assignment: Underwater; Grand Jury; The Third Man
Fresno	California	KFRE-TV	12	Glencannon
Fresno	California	KJEO	47	Danger is My Business; Hour of Stars; How to Marry a Millionaire; NTA Film Spectacular; Official Detective; Sheriff of Cochise; This is Alice
Garden City	Kansas	KGLD	11	Man's Heritage
Grand Junction	Colorado	KREX-TV*‡	5	NTA Film Spectacular; Sheriff of Cochise
Grand Rapids	Michigan	WOOD-TV	8	Danger is My Business; How to Marry a Millionaire; Man Without a Gun; NTA Film Spectacular; Sheriff of Cochise; Shirley Temple Specials; This is Alice
Great Bend	Kansas	KCKT-TV	2	Bill Corum Show; Bobo the Hobo; Drew Pearson; Find a Hobby; International Playhouse; Janet Dean, RN; Man's Heritage; Orient Express; The Passerby; Play of the Week; Sheriff of Cochise
Great Falls	Montana	KRTV	3	Hour of Stars; Sheriff of Cochise
Green Bay	Wisconsin	WBAY-TV*	2	Grand Jury; How to Marry a Millionaire; Man Without a Gun; NTA Film Spectacular; Premiere Performance; The Third Man; This is Alice; U.S. Marshal; William Tell
Green Bay	Wisconsin	WFRV-TV	5	Official Detective; Sheriff of Cochise
Green Bay	Wisconsin	WMBV-TV/ WLUK-TV	11	Danger is My Business; Hour of Stars; Man From Cochise
Greensboro	North Carolina	WFMY-TV	2	The Third Man; U.S. Marshal
Greenville	North Carolina	WNCT-TV	9	Bill Corum Show; James Mason; Orient Express
Greenville	South Carolina	WFBC-TV	4	Man Without a Gun; NTA Film Spectacular; The Third Man; U.S. Marshal
Hannibal	Missouri	KHQA-TV	7	Grand Jury; Sheriff of Cochise; U.S. Marshal
Harlingen	Texas	KGBT-TV	4	How to Marry a Millionaire; Janet Dean, RN; Official Detective; Sheriff of Cochise
Harrisburg	Pennsylvania	WCMB-TV*	27	NTA Film Spectacular
Harrisburg	Pennsylvania	WTPA-TV	71/27	Hour of Stars; How to Marry a Millionaire
Harrison	Arkansas	KHOZ-TV	6	Sherlock Holmes
Harrisonburg	Virginia	WSVA-TV	3	The Third Man
Hartford	Connecticut	WHCT-TV†	18	Danger is My Business; Hour of Stars; Open End
Hartford	Connecticut	WTIC-TV	3	Hour of Stars; How to Marry a Millionaire; Man Without a Gun; Official Detective; Play of the Week; This is Alice
Hastings	Nebraska	KHAS-TV	5	China Smith; International Playhouse; Janet Dean, RN; Orient Express; Play of the Week; Police Call
Hattiesburg	Mississippi	WDAM-TV*	9/7	Bill Corum Show; China Smith; Find a Hobby; How to Marry a Millionaire; Janet Dean, RN; NTA Film Spectacular; New Orleans Police Dept. Orient Express; The Passerby; Premiere Performance; Sheriff of Cochise
Hayes Center	Nebraska	KHPL-TV‡	6	Bill Corum Show; China Smith; Hour of Stars; How to Marry a Millionaire; Mantovani; NTA Film Spectacular; Orient Express
Hilo	Hawaii	KHBC-TV	9	NTA Film Spectacular
Honolulu	Hawaii	KGMB-TV	9	NTA Film Spectacular
Houston	Texas	KGUL-TV/ KHOU-TV	11	Danger is My Business; Man Without a Gun
Houston	Texas	KPRC-TV	2	Divorce Court; Grand Jury; Hour of Stars; Lilli Palmer Theater; Official Detective; Sheriff of Cochise; Play of the Week; The Third Man; U.S. Marshal; William Tell
Houston	Texas	KTRK-TV*‡	13	China Smith; Combat Sergeant; Hour of Stars; How to Marry a Millionaire; Janet Dean, RN; Man Without a Gun; NTA Film Spectacular; Play of the Week; Premiere Performance; Sheriff of Cochise; Sherlock Holmes; This is Alice
Huntington	West Virginia	WHTN-TV	13	Assignment: Underwater; China Smith; International Playhouse; Orient Express; Play of the Week; Sheriff of Cochise; The Third Man
Huntington	West Virginia	WSAZ-TV	3	William Tell
Idaho Falls	Idaho	KIFI-TV	8	How to Marry a Millionaire; The Third Man
Indianapolis	Indiana	WFBM-TV*	6	China Smith; Combat Sergeant; NTA Film Spectacular; Orient Express; The Passerby; Sheriff of Cochise; U.S. Marshal
Indianapolis	Indiana	WISH-TV	8	Assignment: Underwater; Grand Jury; Hour of Stars; How to Marry a Millionaire; Man Without a Gun; NTA Film Spectacular; Premiere Performance; The Third Man; This is Alice; William Tell
Indianapolis	Indiana	WLWI	13	Best of Bishop Sheen
Jackson	Mississippi	WJTV	12	Best of Bishop Sheen; Danger is My Business; How to Marry a Millionaire; Man Without a Gun
Jackson	Mississippi	WLBT*	3	Bill Corum Show; China Smith; Glencannon; NTA Film Spectacular; Orient Express; Police Call; Premiere Performance; Sheriff of Cochise
Jefferson City	Missouri	KRCG*	13	Bill Corum Show; China Smith; International Playhouse; NTA Film Spectacular; Orient Express; Play of the Week; Police Call; Premiere Performance; Sheriff of Cochise
Johnson City	Tennessee	WJHL-TV	11	Play of the Week; The Third Man; U.S. Marshal
Johnstown	Pennsylvania	WARD-TV*	56	NTA Film Spectacular; Orient Express
Johnstown	Pennsylvania	WFBG-TV	10	China Smith; How to Marry a Millionaire; Man Without a Gun; NTA Film Spectacular; Orient Express; Play of the Week; This is Alice
Johnstown	Pennsylvania	WJAC-TV	6	Danger is My Business; Play of the Week; Sheriff of Cochise
Joplin	Missouri	KODE-TV	12	Design for Living; Hour of Stars; How to Marry a Millionaire; Janet Dean, RN; Man Without a Gun; Sherlock Holmes
Juneau	Alaska	KINY-TV*	8	NTA Film Spectacular
Kalamazoo	Michigan	WKZO-TV	3	Hour of Stars; William Tell
Kansas City	Missouri	KCMO-TV	5	Sheriff of Cochise; The Third Man; U.S. Marshal
Kansas City	Missouri	KMBC-TV*	9	Assignment: Underwater; Grand Jury; Hour of Stars; Man From Cochise; NTA Film Spectacular; Open End; Premiere Performance
Kansas City	Missouri	WDAF-TV	4	Crime Reporter; Hour of Stars; Mantovani; Mike Wallace Interview; Official Detective
Kearney	Nebraska	KHOL-TV*‡	13	Bill Corum Show; China Smith; Hour of Stars; How to Marry a Millionaire; Mantovani; NTA Film Spectacular; Orient Express
Knoxville	Tennessee	WATE-TV	6	Hour of Stars; Official Detective
Knoxville	Tennessee	WBIR-TV*	10	How to Marry a Millionaire; Man Without a Gun; NTA Film Spectacular; Premiere Performance; Sheriff of Cochise; The Third Man; This is Alice; U.S. Marshal
Lafayette	Indiana	WFAM-TV*	59/18	NTA Film Spectacular
Lafayette	Louisiana	KLFY-TV*	10	Best of Bishop Sheen; Bill Corum; China Smith; Find a Hobby; Hand to Heaven; Hour of Stars; Janet Dean, RN; NTA Film Spectacular; Official Detective; Orient Express; Sheriff of Cochise; The Third Man; U.S. Marshal
Lake Charles	Louisiana	KPLC-TV	7	Sheriff of Cochise; U.S. Marshal
Lancaster	Pennsylvania	WGAL-TV	8	Divorce Court; Official Detective; Sheriff of Cochise; The Third Man; U.S. Marshal
Lancaster	Pennsylvania	WLBR-TV	15	Hour of Stars; This is Alice
Lansing	Michigan	WJIM-TV	6	Sheriff of Cochise
Laredo	Texas	KGNS-TV	8	China Smith; Official Detective; U.S. Marshal
Las Vegas	Nevada	KLRJ-TV*	2	NTA Film Spectacular
Lawton	Oklahoma	KSWO-TV	7	China Smith; Combat Sergeant; Police Call
Lexington	Kentucky	WKYT-TV	27	How to Marry a Millionaire
Lexington	Kentucky	WLEX-TV	18	How to Marry a Millionaire
Lima	Ohio	WIMA-TV	35	Official Detective; Sheriff of Cochise
Lincoln	Nebraska	KOLN*	10	Combat Sergeant; Hour of Stars; Man Without a Gun; NTA Film Spectacular; Premiere Performance; Sheriff of Cochise; Shirley Temple Specials; The Third Man
Little Rock	Arkansas	KARK-TV	4	Official Detective
Little Rock	Arkansas	KATV*	7	Janet Dean, RN; Man Without a Gun; NTA Film Spectacular; The Third Man; This is Alice
Louisville	Kentucky	WAVE-TV	3	Roller Derby
Louisville	Kentucky	WHAS-TV	11	Sheriff of Cochise
Los Angeles	California	KCOP-TV	13	China Smith; Danger is My Business; George Jessel; Hand to Heaven; Henry Morgan and Co. Hour of Stars; Mantovani; Oscar Levant Show; Play of the Week
Los Angeles	California	KHJ-TV	9	Alex in Wonderland; Best of Bishop Sheen; Official Detective; Open End
Los Angeles	California	KTLA	5	Combat Sergeant; Mike Wallace Interviews; Official Detective; Orient Express
Los Angeles	California	KTTV*	11	China Smith; Crime Reporter; Divorce Court; Glencannon; Hour of Stars; How to Marry a Millionaire; Juke Box Jury; Lilli Palmer Theater; Man Without a Gun; New Orleans Police Dept. NTA Film Spectacular; Open End; Orient Express; Premiere Performance; Sheriff of Cochise; The Third Man; This is Alice; U.S. Marshal
Lubbock	Texas	KCBD-TV	11	Sheriff of Cochise
Lubbock	Texas	KDUB-TV*	13	China Smith; Hour of Stars; How to Marry a Millionaire; Man Without a Gun; NTA Film Spectacular; Official Detective; Play of the Week; Police Call; Premiere Performance; The Third Man; This is Alice; U.S. Marshal
Madison	Wisconsin	WISC-TV*	3	Bill Corum Show; China Smith; Find a Hobby; Grand Jury; International Playhouse; James Mason; Music of the Masters; NTA Film Spectacular; Orient Express; The Passerby; Play of the Week; Police Call; Premiere Performance; Sheriff of Cochise; Sherlock Holmes; Shirley Temple Specials; William Tell
Madison	Wisconsin	WKOW-TV	27	Grand Jury; Play of the Week
Madison	Wisconsin	WMTV	33	Best of Bishop Sheen; Holiday; How to Marry a Millionaire
Manchester	New Hampshire	WMUR-TV	9	Bill Corum Show; Janet Dean, RN; Sherlock Holmes; The Third Man
Medford	Oregon	KBES-TV	5	Grand Jury
Memphis	Tennessee	WMCT*	5	Best of Bishop Sheen; China Smith; Grand Jury; Hour of Stars; How to Marry a Millionaire; Man Without a Gun; NTA Film Spectacular; The Passerby; Premiere Performance; The Third Man; This is Alice
Memphis	Tennessee	WHBQ-TV	13	Best of Bishop Sheen
Memphis	Tennessee	WREC-TV	3	Sheriff of Cochise; U.S. Marshal
Meridian	Mississippi	WTOK-TV	11	Mantovani; The Third Man
Miami	Florida	WCKT-TV	7	Danger is My Business; Grand Jury; Sheriff of Cochise
Miami	Florida	WGBS-TV*	23	China Smith; NTA Film Spectacular
Miami	Florida	WPST-TV	10	Assignment: Underwater; Divorce Court; Hour of Stars; Man Without a Gun; This is Alice
Miami	Florida	WTVJ	4	Divorce Court; How to Marry a Millionaire; Janet Dean, RN; Official Detective; Premiere Performance; The Third Man; U.S. Marshal
Midland	Texas	KMID-TV	2	Danger is My Business; Man's Heritage; Q.T. Hush; U.S. Marshal
Midland	Texas	KOSA-TV	7	Assignment: Underwater; China Smith; Man Without a Gun; Official Detective; Sheriff of Cochise; William Tell
Midland	Texas	KVKM-TV	9	Glencannon; How to Marry a Millionaire; U.S. Marshal
Milwaukee	Wisconsin	WISN-TV	12	Assignment: Underwater; Best of Bishop Sheen; Combat Sergeant; Hour of Stars; New Orleans Police Dept. Official Detective; Sherlock Holmes; The Third Man
Milwaukee	Wisconsin	WITI-TV*	6	Bill Corum Show; China Smith; Combat Sergeant; Divorce Court; Grand Jury; How to Marry a Millionaire; International Playhouse; Lilli Palmer Theater; Man Without a Gun; NTA Film Spectacular; Orient Express; The Passerby; Play of the Week; Police Call; Premiere Performance; Shirley Temple Specials; This is Alice; U.S. Marshal
Milwaukee	Wisconsin	WTMJ-TV	4	Grand Jury; Sheriff of Cochise
Minneapolis	Minnesota	WTCN-TV*	11	Best of Bishop Sheen; NTA Film Spectacular; Premiere Performance
Minneapolis	Minnesota	KMGM-TV/ KMSP-TV	9	O&O (1957) aired: Assignment: Underwater; Divorce Court; How to Marry a Millionaire; International Playhouse; The Third Man
Minneapolis	Minnesota	KSTP-TV	5	Man From Cochise; Police Call; Sheriff of Cochise
Minneapolis	Minnesota	WCCO-TV	4	Divorce Court; Grand Jury; Sheriff of Cochise
Minot	North Dakota	KCJB-TV/ KXMC-TV*	13	Hour of Stars; NTA Film Spectacular
Missoula	Montana	KMSO-TV	13	Glencannon
Mitchell	South Dakota	KORN-TV	5	Grand Jury; Hour of Stars; How to Marry a Millionaire; U.S. Marshal
Mobile	Alabama	WALA-TV*	10	NTA Film Spectacular; Premiere Performance; Sheriff of Cochise
Mobile	Alabama	WKRG-TV	5	Hour of Stars; How to Marry a Millionaire; Man Without a Gun; The Third Man; This is Alice
Monroe	Louisiana	KNOE-TV*	8	Hour of Stars; How to Marry a Millionaire; Man Without a Gun; NTA Film Spectacular; Premiere Performance; This is Alice
Montgomery	Alabama	WCOV-TV*	20	NTA Film Spectacular
Montrose	Colorado	KFXJ-TV‡	10	NTA Film Spectacular; Official Detective; Premiere Performance; Sheriff of Cochise
Muncie	Indiana	WLBC-TV*	49	Hour of Stars; NTA Film Spectacular
Nashville	Tennessee	WSIX-TV*	8	NTA Film Spectacular; Sheriff of Cochise
Nashville	Tennessee	WSM-TV	4	Sheriff of Cochise
New Haven	Connecticut	WNHC-TV	8	Best of Bishop Sheen; Combat Sergeant; Divorce Court; NTA Film Spectacular; Play of the Week; Sheriff of Cochise; The Third Man; William Tell
New Orleans	Louisiana	WDSU	6	Divorce Court; Janet Dean, RN; Mantovani; NTA Film Spectacular; Orient Express; Premiere Performance; Sheriff of Cochise; The Third Man; U.S. Marshal
New Orleans	Louisiana	WWL-TV	4	Assignment: Underwater; Danger is My Business; Glencannon; Grand Jury; How to Marry a Millionaire; Man Without a Gun; Official Detective; Play of the Week; Sheriff of Cochise; This is Alice
New Orleans	Louisiana	WJMR-TV/ WVUE	13/12	Hour of Stars; Janet Dean, RN; Sherlock Holmes
New York City	New York	WABD/ WNEW-TV	5	Assignment: Underwater; Lilli Palmer Theater; Official Detective; Orient Express; Play of the Week; Sheriff of Cochise; Sherlock Holmes
New York City	New York	WNTA-TV†	13	Danger is My Business; George Jessel; Henry Morgan and Co. Hour of Stars; How to Marry a Millionaire; Juke Box Jury; Man Without a Gun; Mike Wallace Interview; Open End; Oscar Levant Show; The Passerby; Play of the Week; This is Alice
New York City	New York	WPIX*	11	Best of Bishop Sheen; Combat Sergeant; Divorce Court; Grand Jury; Hour of Stars; How to Marry a Millionaire; NTA Film Spectacular; Premiere Performance; William Tell
New York City	New York	WOR-TV	9	China Smith; Hour of Stars; How to Marry a Millionaire; Mantovani
Norfolk	Virginia	WTAR-TV	3	Alex in Wonderland; Henry Morgan and Co. Janet Dean, RN; Mike Wallace Interview; Sheriff of Cochise; Sherlock Holmes; U.S. Marshal
Norfolk	Virginia	WVEC-TV*	15	NTA Film Spectacular; Premiere Performance
Oak Hill	West Virginia	WOAY-TV*‡	4	International Playhouse; Janet Dean, RN; Man Without a Gun; NTA Film Spectacular; Premiere Performance
Ogden	Utah	KVOG-TV	9	China Smith; Hour of Stars; Orient Express; Play of the Week; Police Call
Oklahoma City	Oklahoma	KGEO-TV*	5	NTA Film Spectacular
Oklahoma City	Oklahoma	WKY-TV	4	Hour of Stars; How to Marry a Millionaire; Mike Wallace Interview; Sheriff of Cochise; The Third Man; U.S. Marshal
Oklahoma City	Oklahoma	KWTV	9	Grand Jury; How to Marry a Millionaire; Man Without a Gun; This is Alice; U.S. Marshal
Omaha	Nebraska	KETV	7	Janet Dean, RN; Mantovani; Sherlock Holmes
Omaha	Nebraska	KMTV-TV	3	Flash Gordon; Official Detective; Sheriff of Cochise
Omaha	Nebraska	WOW-TV	6	China Smith; Man From Cochise; NTA Film Spectacular; Premiere Performance; Sheriff of Cochise; The Third Man
Orlando	Florida	WDBO-TV	6	The Third Man
Ottumwa	Iowa	KTVO	3	Hour of Stars; How to Marry a Millionaire; Man Without a Gun; Sheriff of Cochise; This is Alice
Panama City	Florida	WJHG-TV	7	The Third Man
Parkersburg	West Virginia	WTAP-TV	15	Danger is My Business; Sheriff of Cochise
Pasco	Washington	KEPR-TV	19	Man Without a Gun
Peoria	Illinois	WTVH*	19	Crime Reporter; How to Marry a Millionaire; NTA Film Spectacular
Philadelphia	Pennsylvania	Channel 4	4	Hour of Stars; How to Marry a Millionaire
Philadelphia	Pennsylvania	WCAU-TV	10	Combat Sergeant; Official Detective; Premiere Performance; Sheriff of Cochise
Philadelphia	Pennsylvania	WFIL-TV	6	Hour of Stars; How to Marry a Millionaire; Man Without a Gun; NTA Film Spectacular; The Third Man; This is Alice; U.S. Marshal; William Tell
Philadelphia	Pennsylvania	WRCV-TV	3	Danger is My Business; Grand Jury
Phoenix	Arizona	KPHO-TV*	5	Assignment: Underwater; Divorce Court; Grand Jury; Hour of Stars; How to Marry a Millionaire; Man Without a Gun; NTA Film Spectacular; Premiere Performance; Sheriff of Cochise; Shirley Temple Specials; The Third Man; This is Alice; U.S. Marshal
Phoenix	Arizona	KOOL-TV	10	Divorce Court; Janet Dean, RN; Juke Box Jury; New Orleans Police Dept. Sheriff of Cochise; Sherlock Holmes
Phoenix	Arizona	KTVK	3	Official Detective
Phoenix	Arizona	KVAR-TV/ KTAR-TV	12	China Smith; Danger is My Business; This is Alice; William Tell
Pierre	South Dakota	KPLO-TV	6	U.S. Marshal
Pinedale	Wyoming	K70AX	70	Danger is My Business; Glencannon
Pittsburg	Kansas	KOAM-TV	7	Danger is My Business; Grand Jury; Official Detective; Sheriff of Cochise; The Third Man; U.S. Marshal
Pittsburg	Kansas	KSWM-TV/ KODE-TV	12	Find a Hobby
Pittsburgh	Pennsylvania	KDKA-TV	2	Assignment: Underwater; Combat Sergeant; Drew Pearson; NTA Film Spectacular; Sheriff of Cochise
Pittsburgh	Pennsylvania	WIIC-TV	11	Henry Morgan and Co. Open End; Sheriff of Cochise; The Third Man; U.S. Marshal
Pittsburgh	Pennsylvania	WQED-TV	13	Open End; Play of the Week
Pittsburgh	Pennsylvania	WTAE-TV	4	Divorce Court; Hour of Stars; How to Marry a Millionaire; Premiere Performance; This is Alice; William Tell
Plattsburgh	New York	WPTZ	5	How to Marry a Millionaire; Man Without a Gun; Official Detective; This is Alice; U.S. Marshal
Pocatello	Idaho	KID-TV	3	Danger is My Business; Glencannon; This is Alice
Portland	Maine	WCSH*	6	Danger is My Business; NTA Film Spectacular; Orient Express; Premiere Performance; Sheriff of Cochise
Portland	Maine	WGAN-TV	13	Assignment: Underwater; Best of Bishop Sheen; Combat Sergeant; How to Marry a Millionaire; Man Without a Gun; Official Detective; Sheriff of Cochise; The Third Man; This is Alice; U.S. Marshal; William Tell
Portland	Oregon	KGW-TV	8	China Smith; Divorce Court; Glencannon; Janet Dean, RN; Juke Box Jury; U.S. Marshal
Portland	Oregon	KLOR-TV/ KPTV*	12/27	China Smith; Danger is My Business; Hour of Stars; How to Marry a Millionaire; Man Without a Gun; NTA Film Spectacular; Official Detective; Orient Express; Premiere Performance; Sheriff of Cochise; Sherlock Holmes This is Alice
Portland	Oregon	KOIN	6	Assignment: Underwater; Hour of Stars; Man From Cochise; Sheriff of Cochise; The Third Man
Portsmouth	Virginia	WAVY-TV	10	China Smith; Hour of Stars
Providence	Rhode Island	WJAR*	10	Hour of Stars; How to Marry a Millionaire; NTA Film Spectacular; Premiere Performance
Providence	Rhode Island	WPRO-TV	12	Sheriff of Cochise; Sherlock Holmes; The Third Man; U.S. Marshal
Quincy	Illinois	WGEM-TV	10	Best of Bishop Sheen; U.S. Marshal
Raleigh	North Carolina	WTVD*	11	Glencannon; How to Marry a Millionaire; NTA Film Spectacular; Premiere Performance; The Third Man; This is Alice
Reno	Nevada	KCRL-TV	4	Danger is My Business; Divorce Court; U.S. Marshal
Reno	Nevada	KOLO-TV	8	Danger is My Business; Glencannon; New Orleans Police Department; The Third Man; This is Alice; U.S. Marshal
Reno	Nevada	CATV 2 (Cable)	2	China Smith; Glencannon; Janet Dean, RN; New Orleans Police Dept. Official Detective; Open End; Play of the Week; Stu Erwin
Reno	Nevada	CATV 4 (Cable)	4	Alex in Wonderland; Divorce Court; U.S. Marshal
Reno	Nevada	CATV 5 (Cable)	5	Glencannon; Hour of Stars; How to Marry a Millionaire; Man Without a Gun; Sheriff of Cochise; This is Alice
Reno	Nevada	CATV 6 (Cable)	6	Assignment: Underwater; Combat Sergeant; Grand Jury; Man Without a Gun; Premiere Performance
Richmond	Virginia	WRVA-TV	12	Mike Wallace Interview; U.S. Marshal
Richmond	Virginia	WTVR-TV*	6	Bill Corum Show; China Smith; Combat Sergeant; Glencannon; How to Marry a Millionaire; Man Without a Gun; NTA Film Spectacular; Official Detective; Orient Express; The Passerby; Police Call; Premiere Performance; This is Alice
Richmond	Virginia	WXEX-TV	8	China Smith; Sheriff of Cochise; The Third Man
Riverton	Wyoming	KWRB-TV	10	Sheriff of Cochise
Roanoke	Virginia	WDBJ*	7	China Smith; Hour of Stars; How to Marry a Millionaire; Man Without a Gun; NTA Film Spectacular; Orient Express; The Passerby; Play of the Week; Premiere Performance; Sheriff of Cochise; Shirley Temple Specials; This is Alice
Roanoke	Virginia	WSLS-TV	10	Glencannon; The Third Man; U.S. Marshal
Rochester	Minnesota	KROC-TV	10	U.S. Marshal
Rochester	New York	WROC-TV	5	Hour of Stars; Sheriff of Cochise; U.S. Marshal
Rochester	New York	WVET/ WHEC-TV	10	NTA Film Spectacular; Premiere Performance
Rock Island	Illinois	WHBF-TV*	4	China Smith; Find a Hobby; Hour of Stars; How to Marry a Millionaire; James Mason; Man Without a Gun; NTA Film Spectacular; Orient Express; The Passerby; Police Call; Sheriff of Cochise; This is Alice
Rockford	Illinois	WREX-TV*	13	Best of Bishop Sheen; James Mason; Man Without a Gun; NTA Film Spectacular; The Passerby; Premiere Performance; This is Alice
Rockford	Illinois	WTVO-TV	39	Official Detective; The Third Man
Roseburg	Oregon	KPIC	4	How to Marry a Millionaire; U.S. Marshal
Roswell	New Mexico	KSWS-TV	8	Sheriff of Cochise
Sacramento	California	KCRA-TV	3	Alex in Wonderland; Danger is My Business; Divorce Court; NTA Film Spectacular; Sheriff of Cochise; This is Alice
Sacramento	California	KOVR	13	China Smith; Glencannon; Hour of Stars; How to Marry a Millionaire; Janet Dean, RN; Man Without a Gun; New Orleans Police Dept. Official Detective; Orient Express; Play of the Week; Sherlock Holmes; This is Alice
Sacramento	California	KVIE†	6	Open End
Sacramento	California	KXTV	10	Assignment: Underwater; Man From Cochise; Sheriff of Cochise
Salinas	California	KSBW	8	U.S. Marshal
Salisbury	Maryland	WBOC-TV	16	The Third Man
Salt Lake City	Utah	KCPX-TV	4	Crime Reporter; Danger is My Business; Divorce Court; Man From Cochise; U.S. Marshal
Salt Lake City	Utah	KLOR-TV	11	Divorce Court; George Jessel
Salt Lake City	Utah	KSL-TV*	5	Assignment: Underwater; Grand Jury; NTA Film Spectacular; Premiere Performance; Sheriff of Cochise
Salt Lake City	Utah	KUTV	2	Hour of Stars; How to Marry a Millionaire; Man Without a Gun; QT Hush; Official Detective; The Third Man; This is Alice; U.S. Marshal
San Angelo	Texas	KTXL-TV/ KCTV*	8	Bill Corum Show; China Smith; NTA Film Spectacular; Orient Express; Play of the Week; Police Call
San Antonio	Texas	KENS-TV*	5	NTA Film Spectacular; Premiere Performance
San Antonio	Texas	KONO-TV	12	Combat Sergeant; Hour of Stars; How to Marry a Millionaire; Man From Cochise; Man Without a Gun; Official Detective; Sheriff of Cochise; This is Alice
San Diego	California	KFMB-TV	8	Assignment: Underwater; Hour of Stars; Sheriff of Cochise
San Diego	California	KFSD-TV	10	Danger is My Business; Divorce Court; Man Without a Gun; U.S. Marshal
San Diego	California	XETV*	6	Assignment: Underwater; Bill Corum; China Smith; Find a Hobby; Glencannon; Hour of Stars; International Playhouse; James Mason; NTA Film Spectacular; Orient Express; The Passerby; Police Call; Premiere Performance; Sherlock Holmes
San Francisco	California	KNTV	11	Hour of Stars; Lilli Palmer Theater; New Orleans Police Department; The Third Man
San Francisco	California	KPIX-TV	5	Assignment: Underwater; Combat Sergeant; Juke Box Jury; Lilli Palmer Theater; NTA Film Spectacular; Police Call; Premiere Performance; Russ Hodges' Scoreboard; The Third Man
San Francisco	California	KQED†	9	Open End
San Francisco	California	KRON-TV	4	Divorce Court; Glencannon; Official Detective; Sheriff of Cochise; U.S. Marshal
San Francisco	California	KTVU	2	Alex in Wonderland; Danger is My Business; Glencannon; Hour of Stars; How to Marry a Millionaire; Juke Box Jury; Man From Cochise; Man Without a Gun; Play of the Week; Sheriff of Cochise; This is Alice
San Francisco	California	KGO-TV	7	Assignment: Underwater; Man From Cochise; Man Without a Gun
Santa Barbara	California	KEYT-TV	3	Bill Corum Show; Danger is My Business; Find a Hobby; Glencannon; Grand Jury; Holiday; Hour of Stars; How to Marry a Millionaire; Juke Box Jury; Official Detective; Orient Express; The Passerby; Sheriff of Cochise; U.S. Marshal
Savannah	Georgia	WSAV-TV*	3	Glencannon; Hour of Stars; NTA Film Spectacular; Premiere Performance; U.S. Marshal
Savannah	Georgia	WTOC-TV	11	Sheriff of Cochise
Schenectady	New York	WRGB	6	Assignment: Underwater; Danger is My Business; Grand Jury; Official Detective; Play of the Week; Sheriff of Cochise; The Third Man; This is Alice; U.S. Marshal
Scranton	Pennsylvania	WDAU	22	Grand Jury; Hour of Stars; Man's Heritage; Play of the Week
Seattle	Washington	KING-TV	5	China Smith; Danger is My Business; Divorce Court; Glencannon; Grand Jury; Open End; Sheriff of Cochise; The Third Man
Seattle	Washington	KIRO-TV	7	Man From Cochise
Seattle	Washington	KOMO-TV	4	Assignment: Underwater; Glencannon; Juke Box Jury
Seattle	Washington	KTNT-TV*	11	Alex in Wonderland; Henry Morgan; Hour of Stars; How to Marry a Millionaire; Juke Box Jury; Man Without a Gun; Mike Wallace Interview; NTA Film Spectacular; Official Detective; Premiere Performance; Sheriff of Cochise; This is Alice; U.S. Marshal; William Tell
Shreveport	Louisiana	KCMC-TV/ KTAL-TV	6	Official Detective; Sheriff of Cochise; Sherlock Holmes; U.S. Marshal
Shreveport	Louisiana	KSLA	12	Assignment: Underwater; Hour of Stars; Man Without a Gun; Sheriff of Cochise
Shreveport	Louisiana	KTBS-TV	3	Glencannon; How to Marry a Millionaire; Man Without a Gun; Sherlock Holmes; The Third Man; This is Alice; U.S. Marshal
Sioux City	Iowa	KTIV*	4	Hour of Stars; How to Marry a Millionaire; Man Without a Gun; NTA Film Spectacular; Police Call; Premiere Performance; This is Alice; U.S. Marshal
Sioux City	Iowa	KVTV	9	The Third Man; U.S. Marshal
Sioux Falls	South Dakota	KELO-TV	11	Best of Bishop Sheen; Design For Living
Sioux Falls	South Dakota	KSOO-TV	13	Grand Jury; Hour of Stars; How to Marry a Millionaire; The Third Man; U.S. Marshal
Sitka	Alaska	KSA-TV	4	Hour of Stars; The Third Man
South Bend	Indiana	WSBT-TV	22	Combat Sergeant
South Bend	Indiana	WSJV*‡	52	NTA Film Spectacular; Premiere Performance
Spartanburg	South Carolina	WSPA-TV	7	Hour of Stars
Spokane	Washington	KHQ-TV	6	Official Detective; Sheriff of Cochise; The Third Man; U.S. Marshal
Spokane	Washington	KREM-TV*	2	Combat Sergeant; Glencannon; Grand Jury; Hour of Stars; How to Marry a Millionaire; Janet Dean, RN; NTA Film Spectacular; NTA Presents; Play of the Week; Premiere Performance; This is Alice; U.S. Marshal
Spokane	Washington	KXLY-TV	4	Assignment: Underwater; Sheriff of Cochise; This is Alice
Springfield	Illinois	WICS	20	China Smith
Springfield	Massachusetts	WHYN-TV*	55/40	Best of Bishop Sheen; NTA Film Spectacular; Premiere Performance; Sheriff of Cochise; Shirley Temple Specials
Springfield	Massachusetts	WWLP	22	Bill Corum Show; China Smith; Hour of Stars; Orient Express; Play of the Week; Sheriff of Cochise; The Third Man
Springfield	Missouri	KTTS-TV	10	How to Marry a Millionaire; Man Without a Gun; Sheriff of Cochise; This is Alice
Springfield	Missouri	KYTV	3	Grand Jury; The Third Man
St. Joseph	Missouri	KFEQ-TV*‡	2	Bill Corum Show; China Smith; Find a Hobby; Hand to Heaven; How to Marry a Millionaire; International Playhouse; Janet Dean, RN; NTA Film Spectacular; Orient Express; The Passerby; Play of the Week; Police Call; Premiere Performance
St. Louis	Missouri	KPLR-TV†	11	Alex in Wonderland; Best of Bishop Sheen; China Smith; Glencannon; Hour of Stars; How to Marry a Millionaire; Juke Box Jury; Mike Wallace Interview; Open End; Official Detective; Play of the Week; This is Alice; William Tell
St. Louis	Missouri	KSD-TV	5	Divorce Court; Grand Jury; NTA Film Spectacular; Premiere Performance; Sheriff of Cochise
St. Louis	Missouri	KTVI	36/2	Bill Corum Show; China Smith; Combat Sergeant; International Playhouse; James Mason; Janet Dean, RN; Man Without a Gun; Orient Express; The Passerby; Play of the Week; The Third Man; U.S. Marshal
Steubenville	Ohio	WSTV-TV	9	Hour of Stars; How to Marry a Millionaire; Man Without a Gun
Sweetwater	Texas	KPAR-TV*	12	Hour of Stars; How to Marry a Millionaire; Man Without a Gun; NTA Film Spectacular; Official Detective; Play of the Week; Police Call; U.S. Marshal
Syracuse	New York	WHEN-TV	8	NTA Film Spectacular; Premiere Performance
Syracuse	New York	WSTM-TV	3	How to Marry a Millionaire; Man Without a Gun; Official Detective; The Third Man; This is Alice; U.S. Marshal
Tacoma	Washington	KTVW	13	New Orleans Police Dept. Sherlock Holmes
Tallahassee	Florida	WCTV	6	China Smith; Janet Dean, RN; New Orleans Police Dept. Orient Express; Sherlock Holmes; The Third Man
Tampa	Florida	WSUN-TV*	38	NTA Film Spectacular; Premiere Performance
Tampa	Florida	WTVT	13	Sheriff of Cochise
Temple	Texas	KCEN-TV	6	China Smith; How to Marry a Millionaire; International Playhouse; James Mason; Layman's Call to Prayer; Man Without a Gun; NTA Film Spectacular; Official Detective; Orient Express; Play of the Week; Sheriff of Cochise; This is Alice
Terre Haute	Indiana	WTHI-TV	10	Sheriff of Cochise; The Third Man; U.S. Marshal
Toledo	Ohio	WSPD-TV	13	Grand Jury; NTA Film Spectacular; Premiere Performance
Toledo	Ohio	WTOL	11	Danger is My Business; Official Detective; U.S. Marshal
Topeka	Kansas	WIBW-TV†	13	Hour of Stars; How to Marry a Millionaire; Man Without a Gun; Open End; Orient Express; The Passerby; Sheriff of Cochise; This is Alice
Traverse City	Michigan	WPBN-TV	7	Sheriff of Cochise; The Third Man
Tucson	Arizona	KGUN-TV	9	Best of Bishop Sheen; Sherlock Holmes; William Tell
Tucson	Arizona	KOPO-TV/ KOLD-TV	13	Assignment: Underwater; Official Detective; Sheriff of Cochise; The Third Man; U.S. Marshal
Tucson	Arizona	KVOA*	4	Danger is My Business; Hour of Stars; How to Marry a Millionaire; Man Without a Gun; NTA Film Spectacular; Premiere Performance; This is Alice
Tulsa	Oklahoma	KOTV*	6	Grand Jury; NTA Film Spectacular; Premiere Performance; Sheriff of Cochise; U.S. Marshal
Tulsa	Oklahoma	KTVX/ KTUL	8	Combat Sergeant; Hour of Stars; How to Marry a Millionaire; Official Detective; The Third Man; This is Alice
Tulsa	Oklahoma	KVOO-TV	2	China Smith; Official Detective; Sheriff of Cochise
Twin Falls	Idaho	KLIX-TV*	11	Bill Corum Show; China Smith; Danger is My Business; James Mason; NTA Film Spectacular; Orient Express; The Passerby; Play of the Week; Premiere Performance; Sheriff of Cochise
Waco	Texas	KWTX-TV	10	Combat Sergeant; Sheriff of Cochise; The Third Man
Wailuku	Hawaii	KMAU-TV	3	NTA Film Spectacular
Walla Walla	Washington	KNBS-TV	22	Hour of Stars
Washington	District of Columbia	WMAL-TV*	7	Combat Sergeant; Danger is My Business; Glencannon; NTA Film Spectacular; Premiere Performance
Washington	District of Columbia	WTOP-TV	9	China Smith; Hour of Stars; Play of the Week
Washington	District of Columbia	WTTG	5	Assignment: Underwater; Hand to Heaven; Hour of Stars; How to Marry a Millionaire; Lilli Palmer Theatre; New Orleans Police Dept. Official Detective; Open End; Sheriff of Cochise; This is Alice
Washington	North Carolina	WITN-TV	7	The Third Man
Waterbury	Connecticut	WATR-TV	53	Best of Bishop Sheen; NTA Film Spectacular
Waterloo	Iowa	KWWL*	7	Bill Corum Show; China Smith; Hour of Stars; How to Marry a Millionaire; International Playhouse; Man Without a Gun; NTA Film Spectacular; Orient Express; The Passerby; Play of the Week; Police Call; Premiere Performance; Shirley Temple Specials; This is Alice
Watertown	New York	WCNY-TV*	7	China Smith; Grand Jury; NTA Film Spectacular; Orient Express; Play of the Week; Sheriff of Cochise
Wausau	Wisconsin	WSAW-TV	7	China Smith; Lilli Palmer Theatre; Orient Express; Play of the Week; Police Call; Sheriff of Cochise; The Third Man
Weslaco	Texas	KRGV-TV	5	Hour of Stars; The Third Man
West Palm Beach	Florida	WEAT-TV	12	China Smith; Danger is My Business
West Palm Beach	Florida	WPTV-TV	5	Assignment: Underwater; Grand Jury; How to Marry a Millionaire; Man Without a Gun; Official Detective; Sheriff of Cochise; William Tell
Wheeling	West Virginia	WTRF-TV	7	Henry Morgan and Co. NTA Film Spectacular; Premiere Performance; The Third Man; U.S. Marshal
Wichita	Kansas	KAKE-TV	10	Combat Sergeant; U.S. Marshal
Wichita	Kansas	KARD-TV	3	Glencannon; Hour of Stars; Play of the Week
Wichita	Kansas	KTVH*	12	How to Marry a Millionaire; Mantovani; NTA Film Spectacular; Open End; Premiere Performance; Sheriff of Cochise; The Third Man; This is Alice; U.S. Marshal
Wichita Falls	Texas	KSYD-TV*	6	Bill Corum Show; China Smith; Janet Dean, RN; Man Without a Gun; NTA Film Spectacular; Premiere Performance; Sheriff of Cochise
Wichita Falls	Texas	KFDX-TV	3	Drew Pearson; Hour of Stars; How to Marry a Millionaire; Man Without a Gun; This is Alice; U.S. Marshal
Wilkes-Barre	Pennsylvania	WBRE-TV	28	Danger is My Business; The Third Man
Wilkes Barre	Pennsylvania	WILK-TV/ WNEP-TV*	34/16	Bobo the Hobo; China Smith; NTA Film Spectacular
Wilmington	Delaware	WPFH/ WVUE	12	China Smith; Combat Sergeant; Police Call; Orient Express; Sherlock Holmes
Winston-Salem	North Carolina	WSJS-TV	12	Glencannon; Wiliam Tell
York	Pennsylvania	WNOW-TV*	49	NTA Film Spectacular; Premiere Performance
Yuma	Arizona	KIVA	11	China Smith; Design for Living; Glencannon; Official Detective; Sheriff of Cochise; U.S. Marshal
Yuma	Arizona	XEM-TV	3	Combat Sergeant; Find a Hobby; Orient Express; The Passerby; Play of the Week; Sherlock Holmes
Zanesville	Ohio	WHIZ-TV	18	Danger is My Business; The Third Man; U.S. Marshal

An asterisk (*) denotes stations that affiliated at the launch of the network. A dagger (†) indicates stations that aired NTA's few live broadcasts. A diesis (‡) indicates stations that identified as NTA affiliates in the 1957–1958 Broadcasting/Telecasting Yearbook.

=== Owned and operated stations of other networks ===
A number of CBS, ABC, and NBC owned-and-operated stations (O&Os) also aired NTA programs. Among these were:

Table of network O&Os that aired NTA programs
City	State	Call sign	Network	Channel	Programs aired
Chicago	Illinois	WBBM-TV	CBS	2	Juke Box Jury; Sheriff of Cochise
Chicago	Illinois	WNBQ	NBC	5	Combat Sergeant; Official Detective; Orient Express; Sheriff of Cochise; Sherlock Holmes
Los Angeles	California	KABC-TV	ABC	7	Drew Pearson; Glencannon; Janet Dean, RN; Orient Express; U.S. Marshal; William Tell
Los Angeles	California	KNXT	CBS	2	Assignment: Underwater; Grand Jury; Sheriff of Cochise; This is Alice
Los Angeles	California	KRCA-TV	NBC	4	Grand Jury
New York City	New York	WABC-TV	ABC	7	U.S. Marshal
New York City	New York	WCBS-TV	CBS	2	Man Without a Gun
New York City	New York	WRCA-TV	NBC	4	Grand Jury; The Third Man
Washington	District of Columbia	WRC-TV	NBC	4	Play of the Week; Sheriff of Cochise; The Third Man

== Radio simulcast ==
One of the more unusual broadcast agreements during the 1950s was a deal with radio station KSBK (later JORO) in Naha, Okinawa, during the era when Okinawa was a U.S.-administered territory (1952 to 1972). KSBK simulcast the audio portion of the program for U.S. servicemen and their families. A video feed came from mainland Japan. Among the NTA programs broadcast in this way were Divorce Court, George Jessel, and Sheriff of Cochise.

== See also ==
- List of former NTA Film Network affiliates in Canada

== Sources ==
- Brooks, Tim; Earle Marsh (2007). The Complete Directory to Prime Time Network and Cable TV Shows (1946—Present): Ninth Edition. U.S.A.: Ballantine Books. p. 1702. ISBN 978-0-345-49773-4.
- Erickson, Hal (1989). Syndicated Television: The First 40 Years, 1947–1987. Jefferson, NC: McFarland. ISBN 0-7864-1198-8.
