= List of NTA Film Network affiliates in Canada =

This is a list of former NTA Film Network affiliates in Canada. The NTA Film Network was an American television network or syndication service which operated from August 1956 to 1961, when the network's flagship station, WNTA-TV, was sold. Although NTA was based in the United States, many Canadian television stations aired NTA programs.

| City, Province | Station | Programs aired |
|---|---|---|
| Barrie, ON | CKVR-TV 3 (Now CTV Two O&O) | Hour of Stars; Mantovani |
| Brandon, MB | CKX-TV 5 (later a private affiliate of CBC; now defunct) | China Smith; Danger is My Business; Hour of Stars; Mantovani; Sheriff of Cochise |
| Cornwall, ON | CJSS-TV 8 (Now closed) | Alex in Wonderland; Hour of Stars; How to Marry a Millionaire; Sheriff of Cochise |
| Fredericton, NB | CHSJ-TV 4 (CBC O&O) | Premiere Performance |
| Hamilton, ON | CHCH-TV 11 | Mantovani |
| Kingston, ON | CKWS-TV 11 | Mantovani; Official Detective |
| Kitchener, ON | CKCO-TV 13 | Alex in Wonderland; Mantovani |
| Lethbridge, AB | CJLH-TV 7 | Hour of Stars; How to Marry a Millionaire; Mantovani; Premiere Performance |
| London, ON | CFPL-TV 10 (Now CTV Two O&O) | Hour of Stars; How to Marry a Millionaire; Mantovani; Sheriff of Cochise |
| Moncton, NB | CKCW-TV (Now a CTV O&O) | Premiere Performance |
| Montreal, QC | CBMT-TV 6 (CBC O&O) | James Mason; Man's Heritage; Premiere Performance |
| Montreal, QC | CKMI-TV 5 (Now Global O&O) | Hour of Stars; James Mason; The Passerby |
| North Bay, ON | CKGN-TV 10 (CTV O&O) | Hour of Stars; Mantovani |
| Ottawa, ON | CBOFT 9 (Radio-Canada O&O) | Mantovani |
| Ottawa, ON | CBOT-TV 4 (CBC O&O) | How to Marry a Millionaire; Man's Heritage; Mantovani; Premiere Performance; This is Alice |
| Ottawa, ON | CJOH-TV 13 (CTV O&O) | Play of the Week; The Third Man |
| Prince George, BC | CKPG-TV 4 (Now Citytv affiliated station) | How to Marry a Millionaire; Sheriff of Cochise; U.S. Marshal |
| Prince George, BC | channel 3 | Assignment: Underwater; Best of Bishop Sheen; Hour of Stars; Official Detective; The Third Man; William Tell |
| Regina, SK | CKCK-TV 2 | Best of Bishop Sheen |
| Sault Ste. Marie, ON | CJIC-TV 2 | Mantovani |
| Sudbury, ON | CKSO-TV 5 | Mantovani |
| Thunder Bay, ON | CFCJ-TV 2 | Sheriff of Cochise |
| Toronto, ON | CBLT-TV 6 (CBC O&O) | Mantovani; Premiere Performance; Sheriff of Cochise |
| Toronto, ON | CFTO-TV 9 (CTV O&O) | Glencannon; Mike Wallace Interviews |
| Vancouver, BC | CHAN-TV 8 (Now Global O&O) | Premiere Performance |
| Victoria, BC | CHEK-TV 6 | China Smith |
| Windsor, ON | CKLW-TV 9 (CBC O&O) | Hour of Stars; How to Marry a Millionaire; Man Without a Gun; NTA Film Spectacular; Premiere Performance; Sheriff of Cochise; William Tell |
| Wingham, ON | CKNX-TV 8 (CBC O&O) | Mantovani |
| Winnipeg, MB | CBWFT 6 (Radio-Canada O&O) | Danger is My Business |
| Winnipeg, MB | CBWT 3 (CBC O&O) | Danger is My Business; How to Marry a Millionaire; Premiere Performance; This is Alice |
| Winnipeg, MB | CJAY-TV 7 | Assignment: Underwater; Glencannon; Grand Jury; Hour of Stars; How to Marry a Millionaire; Man From Cochise; Man Without a Gun; Official Detective; Play of the Week; The Third Man; This is Alice; William Tell |
| Yorkton, SK | CKOS-TV 3 | Best of Bishop Sheen; Hour of Stars; Official Detective |
