= Mantovani (TV series) =

- Starring: Mantovani; John Conte
- Country of origin: United States

Production
- Running time: 30 minutes

Original release
- Network: Syndication (NTA Film Network)
- Release: January 1959 – 1959

Mantovani is an American television series which aired in NTA Film Network syndication during 1959.

== Overview ==
It was an easy-listening musical program featuring British orchestra leader Annunzio Paolo Mantovani and his 46-piece orchestra, and hosted by John Conte. Guest stars included Vic Damone, Connie Francis, Dorothy Collins, Joni James, and the Hi-Los.

In Newark, New Jersey, radio station WNTA simulcast the audio of the broadcast on WNTA-TV and encouraged listeners to tune in both with receivers about eight feet apart and against a wall to create a "maximum hi-fi effect".

== Production ==
Recorded by Towers of London, the series was produced in England during 1958 and 1959, but was distributed to local stations across the United States. 39 episodes were filmed for National Telefilm Associates.

In 2019, Filmrise offered 20 restored episodes of Mantovani on their free streaming service.
