= Official Detective =

American syndicated TV anthology series (1957–1958)

- Genre: Anthology
- Written by: Mort Briskin; Don Martin
- Directed by: Paul Guilfoyle; Lee Sholem
- Presented by: Everett Sloane
- Theme music composer: Jack Shaindlin
- Composer: E.C. Norton
- Country of origin: United States
- Original language: English
- No. of seasons: 1
- No. of episodes: 40

Production
- Producer: Mort Briskin
- Camera setup: Single-camera
- Running time: 25 mins.
- Production companies: Desilu Productions; National Telefilm Associates

Original release
- Network: Syndication
- Release: 1957 – March 19, 1958

Official Detective is an American anthology television series which aired in syndication from 1957 to March 19, 1958. The series was hosted by veteran film actor Everett Sloane.

== Overview ==
The production of the first pilot was announced in December 1956. The story dealt with the slaying of a woman where the main challenge is to identify the body.

Mort Briskin was the producer, and Lee Sholem was the director. The episodes of Official Detective are archived at the UCLA Film & Television Archive in Los Angeles. Episodes were produced for NTA at Desilu.

Desilu employed professional detectives as technical advisers to ensure that procedures depicted in the program accurately represented real-life police work. Scripts were adapted from articles published in Official Detective magazine, and officials at the magazine reviewed the scripts' content for accuracy.

== Critical response ==
Critic Jack Gould, writing in The New York Times, described the program as "another routine crime series", adding, "The major horror of the first episode was the senseless slaughter of half-hour by a very ancient blunt instrument."

A review in the trade publication Billboard called the program "another of this year's more solid entries into the syndication field". The review called the premiere episode's approach "a little too pedestrian". Although it said that some dialog was corny, it added that the show "has enough muscle to have planted a firm foot on the ground."
