= How to Marry a Millionaire (TV series) =

American television series 1957-1959

- Genre: Sitcom
- Starring: Lori Nelson (Season 1); Merry Anders; Barbara Eden; Lisa Gaye (Season 2)
- Theme music composer: Alec Compinsky
- Composer: Leon Klatzkin
- Country of origin: United States
- Original language: English
- No. of seasons: 2
- No. of episodes: 52

Production
- Executive producers: Irving Asher; Nat Perrin
- Producers: Ben Feiner, Jr. Paul Jones; Nat Perrin
- Camera setup: Single-camera
- Running time: 24 minutes
- Production companies: 20th Century-Fox Television; National Telefilm Associates

Original release
- Network: Syndication; NTA Film Network
- Release: October 7, 1957 – August 20, 1959

Related
- How to Marry a Millionaire

How to Marry a Millionaire is an American sitcom that aired in syndication and on the NTA Film Network from October 7, 1957 to August 20, 1959. The series is based on the 1953 film of the same name starring Marilyn Monroe, Betty Grable, and Lauren Bacall.

The series stars Lori Nelson, Merry Anders, and Barbara Eden. Lisa Gaye joined the cast in the second season after Lori Nelson left the series. How to Marry a Millionaire was one of the first television sitcoms based on a feature film, and was the first series that Barbara Eden was featured in as a regular cast member. Eden would go on to play one of her more notable roles, "Jeannie" in the NBC sitcom I Dream of Jeannie.

== Synopsis ==
=== Season one ===
The series follows the adventures and mishaps of three 20-something women who are attempting to marry a rich man. The three women are Greta Hanson (Nelson), a sophisticated, college educated co-hostess of the quiz show Go For Broke; Michelle "Mike" McCall (Anders), an intelligent (and often scheming), wise cracking Wall Street secretary; and Loco Jones (Eden), a ditzy but good-hearted "Miss Magoo"-esque fashion model who, despite having very poor eyesight, refuses to wear her glasses in the presence of men. As in the film, the three women have concocted a scheme to land a rich husband by placing themselves in the same social scene as rich bachelors. The three rent a pricey penthouse apartment together at the Tower House on Park Avenue and vow to help each other land a rich husband. While their address may be ritzy, Greta, Mike and Loco struggle to make the rent, are constantly faced with the threat of eviction and barely make ends meet.

In the series' initial episodes, Dabbs Greer portrayed Mr. Blandish, the Tower House's building manager who frequently threatens the women with eviction due to their failure to pay the rent on time. Midway through the first season, Joseph Kearns was cast as the building manager, Augustus P. Tobey. Mr. Tobey is also regularly annoyed by Greta, Mike and Loco because of their inability to pay the rent on time and is constantly trying to get the women evicted. Also appearing in a recurring role is Jimmy Cross, the building's elevator operator Jesse Flouge who often helps, but sometimes inadvertently hinders, the women in their millionaire husband landing schemes.

The original, unaired pilot episode was shot in Spring 1957. Lori Nelson appeared as Greta Lindquist (the character's last name was later changed to Hanson), Loco Jones was played by Charlotte Austin and Doe Avedon (ex-wife of photographer Richard Avedon) portrayed Mike McCall. Joseph Kearns, who was later cast in the series as the women's building manager, appeared in the pilot as Mike's co-worker Maurice. After all three major networks passed on the series, National Telefilm Associates and 20th Century-Fox Television (which owned part of the series) sold and distributed the series to 115 independent syndicated channels. Millionaire was included in a package deal with two other NTA productions, This Is Alice and Man Without a Gun, that subscribing syndicated channels aired in a programming block on the same night. After the series was sold, Charlotte Austin and Doe Avedon's roles were recast. Approximately seventy actresses auditioned for the roles of Loco and Mike before producers chose Barbara Eden and Merry Anders.

=== Season two ===
How to Marry a Millionaire was generally well received by critics and audiences and a second, abbreviated season was ordered. However, Lori Nelson's character was written out and a new character, Gwen Kirby (Lisa Gaye), was added to the cast. Nelson later said she chose to quit the show stating, "I felt that I was the biggest of the three actresses in terms of star status...I felt that I needed to move on. I didn't need to be stuck in that little series that was in syndication." However, Nelson's co-star Merry Anders said that Nelson was fired. According to Anders, the series' entire first season, 39 episodes, was shot before the series debuted on television. While promoting the series shortly before its debut, Nelson gave an interview in which she said that she was disappointed with her role. She stated that she felt her role was not as well defined as that of her co-stars, who were more clearly based on their film counterparts (Mike McCall was patterned after Lauren Bacall's role while Barbara Eden's character was a combination of Betty Grable and Marilyn Monroe's roles). Anders stated that when the series' production company, National Telefilm Associates, got wind of Nelson's remarks, they fired her.

After Nelson's departure, her character was written out by having her marry a gas station owner and relocating to California. The second-season premiere episode, "Cherchez la Roommate", deals with Loco and Mike trying to find a suitable replacement for Greta or face eviction. Mr. Tobey is delighted that he finally has a legitimate reason to throw the women out and gives them one week to find a new roommate or get evicted. After a disastrous attempt to find a new roommate through a want ad in the newspaper, Loco and Mike are introduced to Gwen Kirby, a new girl in town who needs a place to live. After learning of Mike and Loco's plan to land a rich husband, Gwen agrees to help with their plan and becomes the third roommate.

After an abbreviated second season consisting of thirteen episodes, How to Marry a Millionaire was canceled.

== Cast ==
=== Main ===
- Barbara Eden as Loco Jones
- Merry Anders as Michelle "Mike" McCall
- Lori Nelson as Greta Hansen (Season 1)
- Lisa Gaye as Gwen Kirby (Season 2)

During the series' first season, Eden was billed third. After Lori Nelson left the series, Eden was billed first.

=== Recurring ===
- Dabbs Greer as Mr. Blandish (season 1 only)
- Joseph Kearns as Augustus P. Tobey
- Jimmy Cross as Jesse Flouge

=== Notable guest stars ===
- Morey Amsterdam
- Richard Deacon
- Stacy Keach Sr.
- Werner Klemperer
- Ted Knight
- Charles Lane
- Amanda Randolph
- Cosmo Sardo
- Vito Scotti
- William Swan
- Willard Waterman

== Episodes ==
=== Season 1 (1957–58) ===
The first season of How to Marry a Millionaire premiered on October 7, 1957, and ended in July 1958, after 39 episodes.

No. overall	No. in series	Title	Directed by	Written by	Original release date
1	1	"The Penthouse"	Lester Vail	Howard Leeds & Milton Pascal	October 7, 1957
2	2	"Subletting the Apartment"	Danny Dare	Margaret and Paul Schneider	October 14, 1957
3	3	"Three Pretenders"	Danny Dare	Bernard Drew & John Kohn	October 21, 1957
4	4	"To Hock or Not to Hock"	Danny Dare	Howard Leeds & Milton Pascal	October 28, 1957
5	5	"It's a Dog's Life"	Danny Dare	Martin Ragaway	November 4, 1957
6	6	"The Cruise"	Danny Dare	Bernard Drew & John Kohn	November 11, 1957
7	7	"The Brat"	Danny Dare	William Manhoff	November 18, 1957
8	8	"Loco, the Heiress"	Danny Dare	Si Rose & Seaman Jacobs	November 25, 1957
9	9	"Alias the Secretary"	Danny Dare	Si Rose & Seaman Jacobs	December 2, 1957
10	10	"Sea Island Story"	Danny Dare	Harvey Orkin & Leo Solomon	December 9, 1957
11	11	"Society Mother"	Danny Dare	Margaret and Paul Schneider	December 16, 1957
12	12	"Tom, Dick and Harry"	Danny Dare	Alan Lipscott & Bob Fisher	December 23, 1957
13	13	"Good Time Charlie"	Peter Tewksbury	Margaret and Paul Schneider	December 30, 1957
14	14	"The Bird Man"	Peter Tewksbury	Everett Greenbaum & Milton Pascal	January 7, 1958
15	15	"The Fourth Girl"	Danny Dare	Howard Leeds & Milton Pascal	January 14, 1958
16	16	"For the Love of Art"	Danny Dare	Dick Conway & Roland MacLane	January 21, 1958
17	17	"The Playwright"	Danny Dare	Everett Greenbaum & Milton Pascal	January 28, 1958
18	18	"Youth for the Asking"	Danny Dare	John Kohn & Bernard Drew	February 4, 1958
19	19	"Loco Leaves Home"	Danny Dare	Lou and Bill Derman	February 11, 1958
20	20	"The Maid"	Danny Dare	Everett Greenbaum & Milton Pascal	February 18, 1958
21	21	"Prince Kaudim Story"	Danny Dare	Leo Solomon & Harvey Orkin	February 25, 1958
22	22	"The Yachting Party"	Danny Dare	Dick Conway & Roland MacLane	March 4, 1958
23	23	"The Utterly Perfect Man"	Danny Dare	Karen De Wolfe & John L. Greene	March 11, 1958
24	24	"Loco and the Cowboy"	Danny Dare	Bob Fisher & Alan Lipscott	March 25, 1958
25	25	"Loco Versus Wall Street"	Danny Dare	Si Rose & Seaman Jacobs	1958
26	26	"A Call to Arms"	Jerry Hopper	Dick Conway & Roland MacLane	1958
27	27	"For the Love of Mink"	Bernard Wiesen	John Kohn & Bernard Drew	1958
28	28	"Operation Greta"	Danny Dare	Everett Greenbaum & Milton Pascal	1958
29	29	"Loco Goes to Night School"	Bernard Wiesen	Laurence Marks & Milton Pascal	1958
30	30	"A Job for Jesse"	Bernard Wiesen	Si Rose & Seaman Jacobs	1958
31	31	"Day in Court"	Lester Vail	Harvey Orkin & Leo Solomon	1958
32	32	"A Man for Mike"	Danny Dare	Si Rose & Seaman Jacobs	1958
33	33	"The Truthivac"	Bernard Wiesen	Everett Greenbaum	1958
34	34	"The New Lease"	Bernard Wiesen	Laurence Marks & Milton Pascal	1958
35	35	"Situation Wanted"	Danny Dare	Dick Conway & Roland MacLane	1958
36	36	"Loco and the Gambler"	Danny Dare	Lou and Bill Derman	1958
37	37	"The Big Order"	Bernard Wiesen	Margaret and Paul Schneider	1958
38	38	"The Shortstop"	Danny Dare	Margaret and Paul Schneider	1958
39	39	"Greta's Big Chance"	Bernard Wiesen	Laurence Marks & Milton Pascal	1958

=== Season 2 (1958−59) ===
The abbreviated second season lasted 13 episodes. The second season aired from October 7, 1958, to August 20, 1959. The series was on hiatus from January to June 1959.

No. overall	No. in series	Title	Directed by	Written by	Original release date
40	1	"Cherchez la Roommate"	Danny Dare	Si Rose & Seaman Jacobs	October 7, 1958
41	2	"What's Cookin' with Loco?"	Danny Dare	Laurence Marks & Milton Pascal	October 14, 1958
42	3	"Guest with a Gun"	Danny Dare	Dick Conway & Roland MacLane	October 21, 1958
43	4	"Hit and Run"	Danny Dare	Laurence Marks & Milton Pascal	October 28, 1958
44	5	"The Three Stacked Stockholders"	Danny Dare	Si Rose & Seaman Jacobs	November 1958
45	6	"Gwen's Secret"	Danny Dare	Si Rose & Seaman Jacobs	1959
46	7	"Loco, the Teenager"	Danny Dare	Si Rose & Seaman Jacobs	1959
47	8	"The Seal Who Came to Dinner"	Danny Dare	Si Rose & Seaman Jacobs	1959
48	9	"The Method"	Danny Dare	Laurence Marks & Milton Pascal	1959
49	10	"The Golf Tournament"	Danny Dare	Martin Ragaway	1959
50	11	"The Comic"	Danny Dare	Laurence Marks & Milton Pascal	1959
51	12	"Husband for Julia"	Danny Dare	Kay Lenard & Jess Carneol	1959
52	13	"Love on Approval"	Danny Dare	Dick Conway & Roland MacLane	1959

== Production notes ==
How to Marry a Millionaire was one of the first television series filmed by Twentieth Century Fox. The series was executive produced by Nat Perrin and Irving Asher, and produced by Ben Feiner, Jr. and Paul Jones.

== Home media ==
On February 21, 2017, the first season was released on manufactured-on-demand DVD by CBS Home Entertainment. Season two was released on September 18, 2017.

DVD name	Ep #	Release date
The Complete First Season	39	February 21, 2017
The Complete Second Season	13	September 18, 2017

== Footnotes ==
=== References ===
- Brooks, Tim; Marsh, Earle (2007). The complete directory to prime time network and cable TV shows: 1946 - present (9th ed.). New York: Ballantine Books. ISBN 978-0-345-49773-4.
- Magers, Boyd; Fitzgerald, Michael G. (2004). Westerns Women: Interviews With 50 Leading Ladies Of Movie And Television Westerns From The 1930s To The 1960s. McFarland. ISBN 0-786-42028-6.
- Tucker, David C. (2010). Lost laughs of '50s and '60s television: thirty sitcoms that faded off screen. Jefferson, N.C: McFarland. ISBN 978-0-786-44466-3.
