= Grand Jury (TV series) =

- Genre: Drama
- Created by: Mort Briskin
- Starring: Lyle Bettger; Harold J. Stone
- Composer: Ray Ellis
- Country of origin: United States
- Original language: English
- No. of seasons: 1
- No. of episodes: 40

Production
- Producer: Mort Briskin
- Running time: 22 minutes
- Production companies: Desilu Productions; National Telefilm Associates

Original release
- Network: Syndication
- Release: November 21, 1959 – May 23, 1960

Grand Jury is an American drama television series created by Mort Briskin. The series stars Lyle Bettger and Harold J. Stone. The series aired in syndication from November 21, 1959, to May 23, 1960.

== Premise ==
Episodes in this series dramatized files from the grand jury of Los Angeles. Ex-FBI agent Harry Driscoll and John Kennedy investigated cases for the grand jury.

The series focused more on investigative activities than on activity in the courtroom. Targets of investigations included crime bosses, corrupt officials in prisons, and businessmen who profited at the expense of deaths of other people.

== Cast ==
- Lyle Bettger as Harry Driscoll
- Harold J. Stone as John Kennedy
- Douglass Dumbrille as Grant
- Richard Travis as Thompson
- Ed Prentiss as Russell
- Addison Richards as Fullerton

== Episodes ==
No.	Title	Directed by	Written by	Original release date
1	"Prison Scandal"	Alvin Ganzer	Frank L. Moss	November 21, 1958
2	"The Fire Traps"	Sobey Martin	Ray Buffum	November 28, 1958
3	"The Thieving Eye"	Unknown	Unknown	December 5, 1958
4	"Accident by Appointment"	Sobey Martin	Oliver Crawford	December 12, 1958
5	"The Bus Scandal"	Unknown	Unknown	December 19, 1958
6	"The Organization"	Unknown	Unknown	December 26, 1958
7	"Extortion"	Unknown	Unknown	February 7, 1959
8	"Paradise Acres"	Unknown	Unknown	February 14, 1959
9	"Conspiracy"	Lee Sholem	Frank L. Moss	September 28, 1959
10	"Strong Arm"	Lee Sholem	Don Martin	October 10, 1959
11	"Murder for Insurance"	Sobey Martin	Irving H. Cooper	October 17, 1959
12	"Rendezvous with Love"	Unknown	Unknown	October 24, 1959
13	"Off the Record"	Unknown	Unknown	October 31, 1959
14	"Your Number's Up"	Unknown	Unknown	November 7, 1959
15	"The Big Boss"	Lee Sholem	Don Martin	November 14, 1959
16	"Fighting Alone"	Lee Sholem	Frank L. Moss	November 21, 1959
17	"The Big Take"	Unknown	Unknown	November 28, 1959
18	"Hired for Homicide"	Unknown	Unknown	December 5, 1959
19	"Terror"	Unknown	Unknown	December 12, 1959
20	"The Woman Who Talked"	Unknown	Unknown	December 19, 1959
21	"Parole"	Unknown	Unknown	December 26, 1959
22	"Boxing Scandal"	Lee Sholem	Frank Phares	January 3, 1960
23	"Give Away"	Sobey Martin	Ray Buffum	January 10, 1960
24	"The Guilty Victim"	Sobey Martin	Don Martin	January 24, 1960
25	"No Soap"	Sobey Martin	Don Martin	January 31, 1960
26	"Private Patrol"	Sobey Martin	Martin Berkeley	February 6, 1960
27	"Crime Crusader"	Unknown	Unknown	February 14, 1960
28	"Condemned"	Lee Sholem	Don Martin	February 21, 1960
29	"The Magazine Scandal"	Sobey Martin	Story by : Richard J. Collins; Teleplay by : Richard J. Collins & Frank L. Moss	February 28, 1960
30	"Framed"	Unknown	Unknown	March 7, 1960
31	"Baby for Sale"	Unknown	Unknown	March 14, 1960
32	"The Juke Box Story"	Unknown	Unknown	March 21, 1960
33	"Tough Guy"	Unknown	Unknown	March 28, 1960
34	"Missing Witness"	Unknown	Unknown	April 4, 1960
35	"The Escapee"	Unknown	Unknown	April 11, 1960
36	"Inquest"	Unknown	Unknown	April 18, 1960
37	"Innocent"	Unknown	Unknown	April 25, 1960
38	"The Bootleggers"	Unknown	Unknown	May 9, 1960
39	"Election"	Unknown	Unknown	May 16, 1960
40	"The Perfect Crime"	Unknown	Unknown	May 23, 1960

== Production ==
Episodes were filmed in Hollywood at Desilu Studios, often with sets from RKO Radio Pictures, which had previously occupied the site. Desilu Productions produced the series, which was distributed by National Telefilm Associates Inc. Ray Ellis wrote the theme, which was released in December 1959 by MGM Records.
