= Man's Heritage =

- Starring: Raymond Massey
- Country of origin: United States

Production
- Running time: 10 or 30 minutes

Original release
- Network: Syndicated (NTA Film Network)
- Release: 1954 or 1956

Man's Heritage is an early American television series which aired in NTA Film Network syndication in the 1950s. It was a religious program featuring prolific American actor Raymond Massey. Few details about this little-noted series have been recorded. The series aired during 1956 and was 30 minutes long. However, a 10-minute-long program named Man's Heritage aired during Autumn 1954. In each episode, Mr. Massey would narrate stories from the Bible. The series also aired in parts of Canada.

Massey told stories from the Bible "against a backdrop of famous paintings, sculptures, and tapestries and appropriate classical music". Ely Landau was the producer.
