= Alex in Wonderland (TV series) =

American TV series (1959)

- Directed by: Max Miller
- Presented by: Alexander King
- No. of episodes: ~13

Production
- Producer: Mitchell Grayson
- Production location: WNTA-TV

Original release
- Network: NTA Film Network
- Release: 1959 – 1959

Alex in Wonderland is a 1959 television series of at least 13 episodes that was distributed by the NTA Film Network. The raconteur Alexander King was the host, giving commentary on various topics.

== Format ==
John P. Shanley wrote in The New York Times, "Mr. King, author, artist, and raconteur, spends virtually the entire hour he is on the air each week in telling anecdotes from his own life and philosophizing about achievements and derelictions of others."

In preparation for each episode, King made a list of approximately 20 topics about which he might talk. He said that he always had at least six topics unaddressed when an episode was completed. He sometimes had guests, and his wife sometimes appeared with him. She also occasionally performed a drum solo on the show.

== Production ==
It was produced by Mitchell Grayson and directed by Max Miller. It was filmed on Tuesdays at NTA's flagship station WNTA-TV beginning on March 10.
