= Police Call (TV series) =

- Country of origin: United States
- No. of episodes: 28

Production
- Running time: 30 minutes

Original release
- Network: Syndicated (NTA)
- Release: 1955 – 1956

Police Call is a 1955 anthology drama television series which was based on actual police cases and was one of the top grossing television series released that year. The series was syndicated by National Telefilm Associates.

There were 28 episodes produced, among them:

- An Australian miner vanishes after a big gambling win, featuring Nelson Leigh
- A lovely French agent charms the debonair leader of a smuggling operation, featuring Philip Reed
- An unappreciative delinquent defies his aunt's kindness with a plan to rob her good friend, featuring Alan Furlan
- A boxer's faith in "once a champ, always a champ" rouses suspicion after he wins an uneven match, featuring Shep Menken
- A beach-colony resident is suspected of robbing fur salons posing as a wealthy matron, featuring Laura Solari
- Someone is putting arsenic in bonbons---and giving them to children, featuring Alan Furlan
