= NTA Film Network =

Early American television network

- Type: Defunct broadcast television network
- Country: United States
- Availability: United States (1956–1961)
- Owner: National Telefilm Associates; Twentieth Century-Fox
- Key people: Charles C. Barry; Oliver A. Unger
- Launch date: October 1956; 70 years ago
- Dissolved: November 1961; 64 years ago

The NTA Film Network was an early American television network founded by Ely Landau in 1956 that operated on a part-time basis, broadcasting films and several first-run television programs from major Hollywood studios. Despite attracting more than 100 affiliate stations and securing the financial support of Twentieth Century-Fox (which purchased a 50% share of NTA in November 1956), the network proved unprofitable and was discontinued by 1961. The NTA Film Network's flagship station WNTA-TV is now WNET, one of the flagship stations of the Public Broadcasting Service.

== Origins ==
Parent company National Telefilm Associates was founded by producers Ely Landau and Oliver A. Unger in 1954 when Landau's film and television production company Ely Landau, Inc. was reorganized in partnership with Unger and screenwriter/producer Harold Goldman. NTA was the successor company to U.M. & M. TV Corporation, which it purchased in 1956.

In October 1956, the NTA Film Network was launched with more than 100 affiliate stations. It was a syndication service that distributed films and television programs to independent television stations and stations affiliated with NBC, CBS or ABC. The network's flagship station was WNTA-TV Channel 13 in New York. Trade papers called the NTA Film Network a new television network.

Unlike the Big Three television networks, the local stations in the NTA Film Network were not connected via coaxial cable or microwave relay. Instead, NTA Film Network programs were mailed to each station, a method used by other television syndicators in the 1950s and 1960s. However, many local stations agreed to broadcast NTA Film Network programs simultaneously. Landau's claim to network status was based on the simultaneous airing of the programs.

In November 1956, Twentieth Century-Fox announced its 50% purchase of the NTA Film Network and its plans to produce original content for the network. The film network grew to 128 stations. In September 1957, the network purchased KMGM-TV (now KMSP-TV) in Minneapolis.

== Affiliates ==
The following is a list of NTA Film Network affiliate stations in November 1956.

Ada, OK: KTEN	Grand Junction: KREX-TV	Oklahoma City: KGEO
Allentown-Bethlehem, PA: WGLV	Green Bay-Marinette, WI: WBAY-TV	Peoria: WTVH
Anchorage: KTVA	Harrisburg: WCMB-TV	Phoenix: KPHO-TV
Amarillo, TX: KGNC-TV	Hattiesburg: WDAM-TV	Portland, ME: WCSH
Asheville, NC: WLOS	Henderson-Las Vegas: KLRJ-TV	Portland, OR: KPTV
Atlanta: WAGA	Houston: KTRK-TV	Providence: WJAR
Austin, MN: KMMT	Indianapolis: WFBM-TV	Raleigh-Durham: WTVD
Bakersfield: KERO-TV	Jackson, MS: WLBT	Richmond: WTVR-TV
Bangor, ME: WABI-TV	Jefferson City, MO: KRCG	Roanoke, VA: WDBJ
Birmingham, AL: WBRC	Johnstown, PA: WARD-TV	Rock Island: WHBF-TV
Bismarck ND: KBMB-TV	Juneau: KINY-TV	Rockford, IL: WREX-TV
Carlsbad NM: KAVE-TV	Kansas City: KMBC-TV	Salt Lake City: KSL-TV
Cedar Rapids-Waterloo: KWWL	Kearney, NE: KHOL-TV	San Angelo, TX: KTXL-TV
Charleston, WV: WCHS-TV	Knoxville: WBIR-TV	San Antonio: KENS-TV
Charleston, SC: WUSN-TV	West Lafayette, IN: WFAM-TV	San Diego: XETV
Chattanooga: WDEF-TV	Lafayette, LA: KLFY-TV	Savannah: WSAV-TV
Chicago: WGN-TV	Lincoln: KOLN	Seattle-Tacoma: KTNT-TV
Cincinnati: WKRC-TV	Little Rock-Pine Bluff: KATV	Sioux City: KTIV
Cleveland: WJW-TV	Los Angeles: KTTV	South Bend-Elkhart, IN: WSJV
Columbus, GA: WDAK-TV	Lubbock: KDUB	Spokane: KREM-TV
Columbus, OH: WTVN-TV	Madison: WISC-TV	Springfield, MA: WHYN-TV
Columbus, MS: WCBI-TV	Memphis: WMCT	St. Joseph, MO: KFEQ-TV
Dallas-Ft Worth: KFJZ-TV	Miami: WGBS-TV	Sweetwater, TX: KPAR-TV
Decatur, IL: WTVP-TV	Milwaukee: WITI	Tampa: WSUN-TV
Decatur, AL: WMSL-TV	Minneapolis: WTCN-TV	Tucson: KVOA
Denver: KTVR	Minot: KCJB-TV	Tulsa-Muskogee: KOTV
Des Moines-Ames: WOI-TV	Mobile: WALA-TV	Twin Falls, ID: KLIX-TV
Dickinson, ND: KDIX-TV	Monroe, LA: KNOE-TV	Washington: WMAL-TV
Dothan, AL: WTVY	Montgomery: WCOV-TV	Waterloo-Ft Wayne, IN: WINT
Duluth-Superior: KDAL-TV	Muncie: WLBC	Watertown, NY: WCNY-TV
Eau Claire: WEAU-TV	Nashville: WSIX-TV	Wichita Falls, TX: KSYD-TV
El Paso: KROD-TV	New Jersey-New York: WATV, later WNTA	Wichita-Hutchinson: KTVH
Fairbanks: KTVF	Norfolk: WVEC-TV	Wilkes Barre-Scranton: WILK-TV
Fargo-Valley City: KXJB-TV	Oak Hill, WV: WOAY-TV	York, PA: WNOW-TV

Later affiliates included KOOK-TV in Billings, Montana (c. 1958–1959), KONO-TV in San Antonio (c. 1958–1959), WISH-TV in Indianapolis (c. 1958–1959) and KTVU in San Francisco (c. 1959–1960). The network purchased KMGM-TV in Minneapolis in September 1957.

== Programs ==
The NTA Film Network broadcast both films and television programs. NTA publicized its feature films as "Spectaculars". Seen here is the 1957 advertisement for the first TV airing of Suez, starring Tyrone Power and Loretta Young.

The NTA Film Network aired both films and television series. Among its 1956–1957 offerings were 52 Twentieth Century-Fox films. Premiere Performance, a prime-time block of Twentieth Century-Fox films, aired from 1957 to 1959. Other film blocks included TV Hour of Stars and The Big Night (both 1958–1959).

The network's television programs included:

- How to Marry a Millionaire (1957–1959), based on the popular 1953 film of the same name.
- Man Without a Gun (1957–1959), a Western series about a newspaper editor who brings criminals to justice without the use of guns.
- This Is Alice (1958–1959)
- The Play of the Week (1959–1961), a series of 67 televised plays.

Other lesser-known NTA series included:

- The Bill Corum Sports Show (1957)
- Man's Heritage (1957)
- The Passerby (1957)
- Official Detective (1957–1958)
- Open End (1958–1961)
- William Tell (1958–1959)
- Assignment: Underwater (1959–1960)
- Q. T. Hush (1960–1961)
- The Sheriff of Cochise (1956–1958)
- Alex in Wonderland (1959)
- Newsbeat (1959–1961)
- Juke Box Jury (1958–1959)
- The Best of Bishop Sheen (1958–1963)
- Danger Is My Business (1958)
- Divorce Court (1958–1961)
- Glencannon (1959)
- Grand Jury (1959)
- Mantovani (1959)
- Henry Morgan and Company (1959)
- George Jessel's Show Business (1959)
- The Mike Wallace Interview (1959–1961)
- The Third Man (1960–1961)
- The Oscar Levant Show (1960)
- Confidential Portrait (1962)
- Crime Reporter (1962)
- Probe (1962)

In October 1956, the NTA Film Network also announced provisional plans to telecast live sporting and special events (using network relays) by the 1959–1960 television season.

Friday night NTA Film Network schedule for the 1958–1959 television season
7:00	7:30	8:00	8:30	9:00	9:30	10:00	10:30
—N/a	Man Without a Gun	This Is Alice	How to Marry a Millionaire	Premiere Performance (20th Century Fox movies)			

Up to 17 television stations followed this schedule for the 1958–1959 television season; other affiliates aired the programs out of pattern.

== End of network ==
In January 1959, Ely Landau was succeeded by Charles C. Barry, who assumed the role of president of network operations. Landau continued to chair National Telefilm Associates. Despite Twentieth Century-Fox's 50% ownership, the film network never developed into a major commercial television network on a par with the "Big Three" television networks. Several modern television historians regard the NTA Film Network as a syndication service rather than a major television network.

By 1961, WNTA-TV was losing money, and the network's flagship station was sold to the Educational Broadcasting Corporation that November. WNTA-TV became WNDT (later WNET), flagship station of the National Educational Television network, a forerunner of PBS. NTA network operations did not continue without a flagship station, although parent company National Telefilm Associates continued syndication services. Four television series (Probe, Tintin, The Fair Adventure and A Day with Doodles) were syndicated by NTA between 1962 and 1966.

== See also ==
Other early failed American television networks:

- DuMont Television Network
- Fourth television network
- Overmyer Network (1966)
- Hughes Television Network (1960s–1970s; occasional broadcasts)
- Mizlou Television Network (1968; occasional broadcasts)
- Paramount Television Network (1949–1956)
