= National Telefilm Associates =

American television syndicator (1954–1984)

- Final logo used from 1978 to 1984
- Type: Corporation
- Industry: Television; Broadcast syndication
- Founded: 1954; 72 years ago
- Defunct: December 28, 1984; 41 years ago
- Fate: Renamed Republic Pictures
- Successors: Studio: Republic Pictures; Library: Disney Entertainment (20th Television's pre-1949 20th Century Fox library only); Paramount Television/CBS Media Ventures (all other material)
- Headquarters: Studio City, California

National Telefilm Associates (NTA) was a distribution company primarily concerned with the syndication of American film libraries to television, including the Republic Pictures film library. It was successful enough on cable television between 1983 and 1985 that it renamed itself Republic Pictures and undertook film production and home video sales as well.

== History ==
NTA was founded by Ely Landau and Oliver A. Unger in 1954 when Ely Landau, Inc. was reorganized in partnership with Unger and Harold Goldman. NTA was the successor company to U.M. & M. TV Corporation, which it bought out in 1956. In mid 1956, 20th Century Fox licensed the pre-1948 film library for television distribution, but not the copyrights to National Telefilm Associates.

In October 1956, NTA launched the NTA Film Network, a syndication service which distributed both film and live programs to television stations not affiliated with NBC, CBS, or ABC (DuMont had recently gone out of business). The ad-hoc network's flagship station was WNTA-TV, channel 13 in New York. The NTA Network was launched as a "fourth TV network", and trade papers of the time referred to it as a new television network.

The NTA network launched on October 15, 1956, with over 100 affiliate stations. NTA programming included syndicated programs such as Police Call (1955), How to Marry a Millionaire (1957-1959), The Passerby, Man Without a Gun (1957-1959), and This is Alice (1958). The network also distributed 52 Twentieth Century Fox films in 1956. In November of the same year, it was announced that 50% of the network had been purchased by Fox, which would also produce original content for the network.

In January 1959, Ely Landau was succeeded by Charles C. Barry, who took over as president of network operations. Landau continued to chair National Telefilm Associates. Bernard Tabakin became the president of National Telefilms Associates in 1962 and retained that position until 1975. During his tenure, NTA became the largest independent television distributor in the industry and acquired various film libraries, including NBC Films and Republic Pictures.

Despite the 50% ownership by 20th Century Fox, the film network never developed into a major commercial television network on a par with the "Big Three" television networks; modern TV historians regard the NTA Film Network as a syndication service rather than a major television network.

In March 1973, NTA bought NBC Films, the syndication arm of the NBC television network since June 1948 for $7.5 million, after the FCC ruled TV networks could not syndicate their own shows. Notable titles include Bonanza, The High Chaparral, Car 54, Where Are You?, Kimba the White Lion and Get Smart.

Like its U.M. & M. predecessor, NTA altered the original negatives to the Paramount black-and-white animated shorts, replacing the front-and-end titles. References to Paramount and Technicolor were blacked out, with the NTA logo replacing the Paramount mountain.

At the end of color prints, the NTA logo had a U.M. & M. copyright byline below it, but on black-and-white prints, the U.M. & M. copyright appeared where the original Paramount copyright had been.

On some shorts, either the original Paramount copyright line, the original color process line, the "Paramount Presents" line, or even part of the Paramount logo could still be seen for a few frames before the black bars appear. On two Noveltoons featuring Little Audrey, the "spinning star" portion of the Paramount opening could still be seen. On the Little Lulu cartoons altered by NTA, they had no choice but to leave in the last part of the Paramount opening, albeit with much of it blacked out, since the "Little Lulu by Marge from The Saturday Evening Post" title card appeared over the Paramount mountain. In addition, most Betty Boop cartoons made between 1932 and 1934 utilize the Paramount mountain (minus the stars and typeface) as a backdrop for the main titles, with even a select few keeping the original copyright byline. However, when NTA repackaged many of those same cartoons in the 1970s, the original titles were kept without black bars, but the opening and ending Paramount logos were replaced with a contemporary NTA logo (the design taken from NTA predecessor Commonwealth United). At the same time, the Fleischer Studios feature Gulliver's Travels, as well as a small number of short subjects have circulated with their original Paramount titles.

Following Warner Bros.-Seven Arts' example of having their black-and-white cartoons colorized in 1968, NTA also sent the Betty Boop cartoons to South Korea in the early 1970s to be redrawn in color in order to become more marketable in the wake of color TV.

By 1982, NTA had launched a home video division called NTA Home Entertainment to market its holdings on VHS and Betamax, after its original contract with The Nostalgia Merchant ended. NTA previously licensed several of the titles for videocassette to The Nostalgia Merchant. Two labels, Spotlite Video, releasing video cassettes of public domain material and documentaries, and Inspiration Video, which released Christian/faith content was also established. By 1984, NTA had bought the name and trademarks of the old Republic studio and renamed itself Republic Pictures and the home video arm was renamed Republic Pictures Home Video, as well as Spotlite and Inspiration closing in 1986.

NTA/Republic changed hands in succeeding years, and distribution of the former NTA holdings is split—the theatrical rights are handled by Republic Pictures, an acquisition-only label owned by Paramount Pictures, while television rights lie with Trifecta Entertainment & Media (for the theatrical output), and CBS Media Ventures (for the television library). When Republic folded in 2012, Viacom took full control of the former's theatrical library, with Olive Films or Kino Lorber handling home video rights to the theatrical catalog (except It's a Wonderful Life, which Paramount now distributes on DVD, among other selected films), while Paramount Home Entertainment (through CBS Home Entertainment) handles the television library for home video.

In December 2019, Viacom and CBS Corporation re-merged into a single entity under the name ViacomCBS (later Paramount Global and currently known as Skydance Corporation), which reunited the former NTA assets.

== Library ==
NTA's library includes:

- Most of the pre-1949 films produced by 20th Century Fox (these would later revert to Fox through their own TV division; as NTA held only a license to distribute, while Fox retained ownership)
- Most of Paramount's short film library, including the Fleischer Studios and pre-October 1950 Famous Studios cartoons (excluding Popeye the Sailor and Superman), Puppetoons, and the live-action comedies, musicals, and novelties (Burns and Allen, Robert Benchley, Eddie Cantor, Rudy Vallee, Louis Armstrong, Speaking of Animals, Mack Sennett comedies, Hedda Hopper's Hollywood, etc.)
- Select films produced by Monogram Pictures and Allied Artists Pictures Corporation (post-1938)
- Part of the pre-1952 United Artists library (those films whose rights did not revert to their original producers)
- The Frank Capra film It's a Wonderful Life by Liberty Films and RKO Radio Pictures
- Leo McCarey's Rainbow Productions (The Bells of St. Mary's and Good Sam)
- Gulliver's Travels and Mr. Bug Goes to Town, both produced by Fleischer Studios. These two were purchased from Rainbow Productions as well.
- Enterprise Productions catalog (Body and Soul, Arch of Triumph, Force of Evil, Caught, etc.)
- A number of reissued films from Budd Rogers Releasing Corporation (The Dark Mirror, Magic Town, A Double Life, Secret Beyond the Door, and Mr. Peabody and the Mermaid)
- The library of Richard Feiner & Company, including the pre-1960 United States Pictures catalog
- The 1947 film The Lost Moment released by Universal Pictures
- In the early 1970s, Cary Grant licensed television distribution rights to several of his films, most of them independently produced by his company, to NTA for $2 million including royalties. These films included Penny Serenade, Indiscreet, Operation Petticoat, The Grass is Greener, That Touch of Mink, and Father Goose.
- Select films produced by Landau Company
- The film library of Bank of America
- Most films from NTA's sub-division Commonwealth United Entertainment
- The original Republic Pictures library (NTA had acquired Republic's catalog after that company ceased production in 1957)
- 30 films by Robert L. Lippert's Regal Films that were released by 20th Century Fox
- WNTA-AM-FM-TV, licensed to Newark, New Jersey. WNTA-TV served the New York City television market, broadcasting on Channel 13 beginning in 1958. The stations were previously WAAT AM 970, WAAT-FM 94.7 and WATV. A notable WNTA-TV production syndicated to other commercial stations was the dramatic anthology series, The Play of the Week. NTA shut down its TV station in late 1961, selling its license in 1962 to Educational Broadcasting Corporation, which reappeared in September 1962 as noncommercial WNDT and eventually WNET, the primary PBS outlet for the greater New York area. The radio stations were sold as well; they currently operate as WNYM AM 970 and WXBK 94.7 FM.
