= This Is Alice =

1950s American sitcom

- Genre: Sitcom
- Created by: Sidney Salkow
- Directed by: Sidney Salkow
- Starring: Patty Ann Gerrity; Phyllis Coates; Tommy Farrell; Kathy Garver
- Theme music composer: William Loose; John Seely
- Country of origin: United States
- Original language: English
- No. of seasons: 1
- No. of episodes: 39

Production
- Producer: Sidney Salkow
- Running time: 25 mins.
- Production companies: Desilu Productions; National Telefilm Associates

Original release
- Network: First-run syndication via the NTA Film Network
- Release: 1958 – 1959

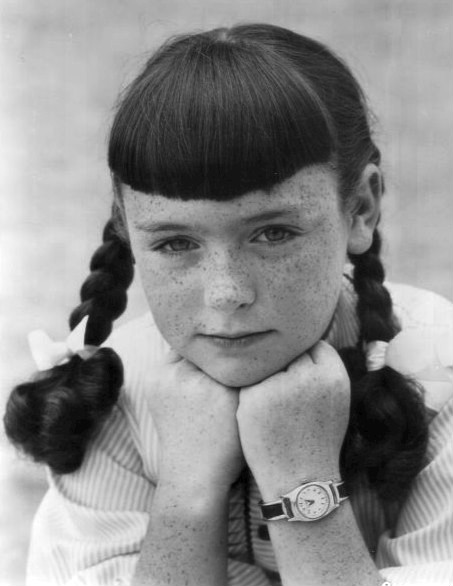
Patty Ann Gerrity as Alice Holliday.

This Is Alice is an American television sitcom starring nine-year-old Patty Ann Gerrity. The program aired in first-run syndication from October 1958 to August 1959, distributed by the NTA Film Network.

== Synopsis ==
Alice Holliday is a precocious nine-year-old girl who lives in the fictional town of River Glen, Georgia (although some sources say the show was set in River Glen, New Jersey). Alice is bright and bubbly and she means well, but no matter how well-intentioned she is, her efforts always seem to backfire, leading to comic adventures and making her the female equivalent and precursor of Dennis the Menace.

Alice's father, Chet Holliday, is a newspaperman. Her mother is Clarissa Mae Holliday, and her grandfather, a former Georgia peanut farmer, is known as "The Colonel." Alice attends River Glen Elementary School, where her best friend is Sally and she also is friends with "Soapy" Weaver — a frequent co-conspirator in her adventures — and Susan Gray.

== Cast ==
- Alice Holliday...Patty Ann Gerrity
- Clarissa Mae Holliday...Phyllis Coates
- Chester ‘Chet’ Holliday...Tommy Farrell
- Sally...Kathy Garver
- Clarence ‘Soapy’ Weaver...Stephen Wootton
- The Colonel...Lucien Littlefield
- Susan Gray...Nancy DeCarl

== Production ==
This Is Alice was produced by National Telefilm Associates and filmed at Desilu Productions. Sidney Salkow created, produced, and directed the series. Production of the series halted in mid-1959.

Kathy Garver, who played Sally, later appeared on Family Affair.

== Broadcast history ==
Thirty-nine episodes were produced. The series ran in first-run syndication from October 1958 to August 1959. Previously broadcast episodes continued to air as late as July 1961.

== Episode status ==
All 39 episodes are held by the UCLA Film and Television Archive.

== Episodes ==
No.	Title	Directed by	Written by	Copyright date
1	"The Princess"	Sidney Salkow	TBA	TBA
The pilot episode for the series, alternatively titled "Princess Pat." A local dressmaker and her daughter — who is a friend of Alice's — plan to move away when the dressmaker's business is unsuccessful, so Alice tries to drum up business for the dressmaker's shop to keep them from leaving.
2	"Alice Goes to Washington"	Sidney Salkow	Unknown	July 2, 1958
Alice agrees to behave if Chet takes Soapy and her with him to Washington, D.C., for a press conference.
3	"Alice Plays Detective"	Sidney Salkow	Unknown	July 21, 1958
When Alice discovers that a friend′s parents are planning to divorce, she tries to bring them back together.
4	"Big Louie Comes Through"	Sidney Salkow	Unknown	September 3, 1958
Alice meets a bookie named Big Louie, and the two of them become involved in a real estate deal after Alice convinces him to use his bad reputation and ready cash to help a needy family.
5	"American Beauty"	Sidney Salkow	Unknown	October 7, 1958
Alice tries to change the mind of a beauty contest entrant who has chosen her career over marriage.
6	"Quiz Show"	Sidney Salkow	Unknown	January 8, 1958
Alice competes against Chet's boss on a quiz show.
7	"Mrs. U.S.A."	Sidney Salkow	Unknown	January 9, 1958
When Chet decides to take Clarissa Mae on a second honeymoon, Alice tries to help her parents by entering Clarissa Mae in a "Mrs. U.S.A." contest in the hope that she will win a trip to Niagara Falls.
8	"Problem Child"	Sidney Salkow	Unknown	January 8, 1958
Alice neglects her schoolwork when she becomes interested in a local spacemen club, sparking an argument between Chet and Clarissa Mae about why Alice is failing in school.
9	"One in a Million"	Sidney Salkow	Unknown	January 8, 1958
When a millionaire who has been confined to his bed sneaks away, he meets Alice, who thinks he is a hobo and brings him home for a good meal.
10	"House Beautiful"	Sidney Salkow	Unknown	July 3, 1958
A beautiful blonde woman upsets the Holliday household by trying to redecorate the family home.
11	"Pie in the Sky"	Sidney Salkow	Unknown	August 19, 1958
Alice enlists the aid of a retired baker to help her bake a pie so she can win the school baking contest.
12	"When the Bow Breaks"	Sidney Salkow	Unknown	July 2, 1958
Alice helps a yacht captain win the affection of a beautiful heiress who is about to marry another man, and the heiress learns the man she is to marry is interested only in her money.
13	"No Place Like Home"	Sidney Salkow	Unknown	August 22, 1958
After a local citizen donates a trailer to a children's club, the Holliday family spends a vacation full of mishaps.
14	"Rock 'n' Roll"	Sidney Salkow	Unknown	July 11, 1958
The Holliday's house guest is a lovelorn Southern belle who is in love with a rock and roll singer, and when the singer refuses to answer her letters to him, Alice decides to help her.
15	"Dandy Donovan"	Sidney Salkow	Unknown	July 25, 1958
Alice and her friends take to horse racing after Alice inadvertently causes her friend's father to buy a racehorse at an auction.
16	"Two Yanks in Georgia"	Sidney Salkow	Unknown	August 29, 1958
Alice and Soapy go to Georgia to visit The Colonel's peanut plantation, where Alice meets two boys and their grandfather.
17	"Pig in a Poke"	Sidney Salkow	Unknown	August 19, 1958
Alice gets in trouble when she buys a pig from a hobo.
18	"Trial Balloon"	Sidney Salkow	Unknown	September 3, 1958
Alice makes a passenger-carrying balloon out of her baby brother's inflatable swimming pool and upsets her parents, the police, and the United States Coast Guard when she and Soapy launch it.
19	"Fortune Teller"	Sidney Salkow	Unknown	August 22, 1958
Alice sets up a fortune-telling booth at a local bazaar.
20	"Callahan"	Sidney Salkow	Unknown	September 8, 1958
Alice convinces a young man who has just arrived from Ireland and needs money to bring his girlfriend to the United States to box the local champion — but when his girlfriend arrives, he must choose between keeping her or winning the fight.
21	"Mail Order"	Sidney Salkow	Unknown	September 2, 1958
Alice meets a scientist on the verge of discovering a new furniture polish.
22	"Song for Sale"	Sidney Salkow	Unknown	September 5, 1958
The local Sunday school teacher is suspended after she is caught playing songs she had written during class.
23	"The Weight Lifter"	Sidney Salkow	Unknown	August 28, 1958
Alice turns diplomat when a visiting aunt has the Hollidays on a diet.
24	"The Prophet"	Sidney Salkow	Unknown	September 22, 1958
A mystic captivates the women of River Glen, but when one of the town's wealthy widows is about to sign over her property to him, Alice discovers a strange episode in his past.
25	"Christmas Story"	Sidney Salkow	Unknown	September 30, 1958
Alice sells Christmas trees to earn money so that she can buy a gift for a kindly old lady..
26	"Hypnotist"	Sidney Salkow	Unknown	September 16, 1958
After seeing a demonstration of hypnotism on television, Alice uses The Colonel's watch to hypnotize Chet.
27	"Rag to Riches"	Sidney Salkow	Unknown	September 4, 1958
In need of money, Alice looks for a get-rich-quick scheme and tries to do a good turn for a millionaire, leading to many complications.
28	"Class Reunion"	Sidney Salkow	Unknown	September 12, 1958
Alice accompanies Chet to his college during alumni week, where she has the opportunity to put a young romance aright.
29	"Circus Time"	Sidney Salkow	Unknown	September 22, 1958
After Alice meets a child performer who is running away from the circus, she becomes involved in the loves and sorrows of the circus people.
30	"Man's Best Friend"	Sidney Salkow	Unknown	October 2, 1958
Alice learns the local butcher is in love with a socialite and tries to foster a romance between them.
31	"Rodeo"	Sidney Salkow	Unknown	October 7, 1958
After Alice finds a Brahma bull left as a present for her in the Hollidays' back yard, she is ordered to dispose of it, leading to the bull joining the rodeo, Chet taking on a new role, and Alice riding the bull in Times Square.
32	"Alice Plays Cupid"	Sidney Salkow	TBA	TBA
When Alice's favorite teacher at River Glen Elementary School is forced to retire because of her age and has little to look forward to, Alice tries to help along a romance between the teacher and the school's janitor.
33	"Guest in the House"	Sidney Salkow	TBA	TBA
After a sophisticated lecturer arrives in River Glen and displays a superior attitude toward the townspeople, he is unhappy when he is forced to stay in the town longer than he anticipated, so Alice shows him all the good things River Glen has to offer.
34	"Help Wanted"	Sidney Salkow	TBA	TBA
After the Hollidays hire a part-time housekeeper, Alice befriends her, decides that an eligible, wealthy bachelor in River Glen would be a good match for her, and tries to kindle a romance between them.
35	"Paper Drive"	Sidney Salkow	TBA	TBA
While collecting scrap paper for a school paper drive, Alice and her friends search an old mansion, where they discover a piece of paper which changes life for an old man who has befriended them.
36	"The Elephant"	Sidney Salkow	TBA	TBA
Alice brings an elephant home as a pet.
37	"Freedom of the Press"	Sidney Salkow	TBA	TBA
After Alice crashes her soapbox into a social tea party, a woman insists that she pay for the damages.
38	"Too Many Fathers"	Sidney Salkow	TBA	TBA
Alice decides that she is adopted and that her parents are planning to get rid of her, so she sneaks off to Philadelphia to find a comedian she thinks is her real father.
39	"The Letter"	Sidney Salkow	TBA	TBA
Alice helps an elderly couple who learn that their son will not be able to attend their 50th wedding anniversary because of business commitments with his advertising firm.
