= The Passerby (TV series) =

The Passerby is an American TV series that was broadcast in the 1950s and was distributed on the NTA Film Network. It was produced by Ely Landau.

Original plans called for a 15-minute program to be aired five times a week with production beginning in New York in October 1952. However, the trade publication Broadcasting in 1953 described the program as a "26-part series of half-hour TV films", with production having begun in June.

Celebrities who made guest appearances included Veronica Lake, Jackie Cooper, Fay Bainter, Eva Gabor, and Kent Smith. Among its directors was James Neilson (director).
