= Man Without a Gun =

American Western TV series (1957–1959)

- Starring: Rex Reason; Mort Mills; Harry Harvey Sr.
- Country of origin: United States
- No. of seasons: 2
- No. of episodes: 52

Production
- Running time: 30 minutes

Original release
- Network: NTA Film Network (Syndicated)
- Release: November 6, 1957 – September 10, 1959

Man Without a Gun is an American Western television series produced by 20th Century Fox Television and presented on the NTA Film Network and in first-run syndication in the United States from 1957 to 1959. Set in the town of Yellowstone near Yellowstone National Park in the then Dakota Territory during the 1870s, the program starred Rex Reason as newspaper editor Adam MacLean, who brought miscreants to justice without the use of violence or gunplay but through his Yellowstone Sentinel. Mort Mills co-starred as Marshal Frank Tallman, who intervened when the "pen" proved not to be "mightier than the sword". Harry Harvey Sr., was cast in twenty-one episodes as Yellowstone Mayor George Dixon.

The program is considered to have been unique because it showcased MacLean's moral ethics and common sense to bring outlaws to justice. The show was also used as a schoolroom to teach the youngsters of the 1950s about decency and the difference between right and wrong.

== Background ==
The 20th Century Fox Hour broadcast "Man of the Law", a pilot of Man Without a Gun.

== Guest stars ==
- Chris Alcaide – as Johnny Kansas in two episodes ("Teen-Age Idol", "The Hero")
- John Anderson ("Eye Witness")
- Whit Bissell – as Mark Ryan in the "Aftermath" episode
- Lloyd Corrigan
- Dennis Cross – as Cheotah in the "Indian Fury" episode
- John Doucette – as Dan Kester in "The Fugitive" episode
- James Drury – as Cort Hamish in the "Aftermath" episode
- Stanley Fafara – as Boy in the "Eye Witness" episode
- Stanley Farrar – as Auges in two episodes ("Guilty", "Eye Witness")
- Bruce Gordon – as Wolf Manson in the "Headline" episode
- Don Gordon ("Jailbreak")
- Dabbs Greer – as Ben McLaren in the "Hangtree Inn" episode
- Ron Hagerthy – as Tod Wilburn in the "Witness to Terror" episode
- Myron Healey – as Yank Sullivan in the "Decoy" episode
- Richard Jaeckel – as Rogers in "The Seven Killers" episode
- Diane Jergens – as Ellen in the "Night of Violence" episode
- Robert Karnes – as Jonas in the "Invisible Enemy" episode
- Dayton Lummis – as Fred Hawkins in "The Fugitive" episode
- Carole Mathews – as Rose in the "Lady from Laramie" episode
- Doug McClure – as Albert (or Ollie) Ketchum in "The Kidder" episode
- Patrick McVey – as Forester in the "Special Edition" episode
- James Philbrook – as Troy in the "Decoy" episode
- Dorothy Provine – as Lucy in the "Man Missing" episode
- Denver Pyle ("Shadow of a Gun")
- Victor Rodman ("Devil's Acre")
- Robert F. Simon – as Hamish Sr. in the "Aftermath" episode
- Olan Soule – as Henry Holbrook in the "Daughter of the Dragon" episode
- Ray Teal ("The Day The West Went Wild")
- Robert Tetrick
- Marie Tsien – as Chi Ying in the "Daughter of the Dragon" episode
- Robert J. Wilke – as Hackett in the "Buried Treasure" episode
- Victor Sen Yung – as Ho Wang in the "Daughter of the Dragon" episode

== Episodes ==
=== Season 1 (1957–1958) ===
No. overall	No. in season	Title	Directed by	Written by	Original release date
1	1	"The Seven Killers"	Unknown	Story by : Teleplay by : Clarke Reynolds	November 8, 1957
2	2	"Decoy"	Charles F. Haas	Story by : Frank Fenton, Joseph Petracca, and Richard H. Landau; Teleplay by : Richard H. Landau	November 13, 1957
3	3	"The Fugitive"	Charles F. Haas	Story by : Lawrence Louis Goldman; Teleplay by : David Lang and Lawrence Louis Goldman	November 21, 1957
4	4	"Teen-Age Idol"	Charles F. Haas	Story by : Teleplay by : Robert Leslie Bellem	TBA
5	5	"Silent Town"	Charles F. Haas	Story by : Eustace Cockrell and Francis M. Cockrell; Teleplay by : Robert Leslie Bellem	TBA
6	6	"Shadow of a Gun"	Unknown	Story by : Teleplay by :	January 20, 1958
7	7	"The Sealed Envelope"	Walter Grauman	Story by : Teleplay by : Jack Laird and Wilton Schiller	January 24, 1958
8	8	"The Thin Wall"	Unknown	Story by : Teleplay by :	January 29, 1958
9	9	"Wanted"	John H. Peyser	Story by : Teleplay by : Robert Leslie Bellem	February 6, 1958
10	10	"The Gun From Boot Hill"	Unknown	Story by : Teleplay by :	February 11, 1958
11	11	"Indian Fury"	Unknown	Story by : Teleplay by :	February 14, 1958
12	12	"Guilty"	Unknown	Story by : Teleplay by :	February 19, 1958
13	13	"Dark Road"	Charles F. Haas	Story by : Teleplay by : Frederic Louis Fox	February 24, 1958
14	14	"Reward"	Charles F. Haas	Story by : Robert Leslie Bellem; Teleplay by : Jack Laird and Wilton Schiller	March 5, 1958
15	15	"Danger"	John H. Peyser	Story by : Teleplay by : Mona Fisher	March 10, 1958
16	16	"The Last Hunt"	Unknown	Story by : Teleplay by :	March 13, 1958
17	17	"The Day The West Went Wild"	Unknown	Story by : Teleplay by :	March 18, 1958
18	18	"High Iron"	Joseph Kane	Story by : Teleplay by : Frank L. Moss	March 28, 1958
19	19	"Peril"	Gene Fowler Jr.	Story by : Teleplay by : Frederic Louis Fox	April 1, 1958
20	20	"Trap Line"	Unknown	Story by : Teleplay by :	April 4, 1958
21	21	"Night Of Violence"	Unknown	Story by : Teleplay by :	April 9, 1958
22	22	"Lady From Laramie"	Unknown	Story by : Teleplay by :	April 14, 1958
23	23	"The Dream Weaver"	Unknown	Story by : David Lang and Robert Leslie Bellem; Teleplay by : Robert Leslie Bellem	April 17, 1958
24	24	"The Law Of The Land"	Unknown	Story by : Teleplay by : Roderick Peterson	April 22, 1958
25	25	"No Heart For Killing"	Unknown	Story by : Teleplay by :	April 25, 1958
26	26	"Buried Treasure"	John H. Peyser	Story by : Teleplay by : Frederic Louis Fox	April 30, 1958
27	27	"The Quiet Strangers"	Charles F. Haas	Story by : Teleplay by : Marion Parsonnet	May 5, 1958
28	28	"The Claim Jumpers"	Unknown	Story by : Teleplay by :	May 8, 1958
29	29	"Jailbreak"	Unknown	Story by : Teleplay by :	May 13, 1958
30	30	"The Kidder"	John H. Peyser	Story by : Teleplay by : Sam Peckinpah	May 16, 1958
31	31	"Lissie"	Unknown	Story by : Teleplay by :	May 21, 1958
32	32	"Aftermath"	Walter E. Grauman	Story by : Robert Presnell Sr. Teleplay by : Herbert R. Purdom	May 26, 1958
33	33	"The Last Bullet"	John H. Peyser	Story by : Teleplay by :	May 29, 1958
34	34	"Special Edition"	Unknown	Story by : Teleplay by :	June 4, 1958
35	35	"Headline"	John H. Peyser	Story by : Teleplay by : Harry Kronman	June 9, 1958
36	36	"Man Missing"	Charles F. Haas	Story by : Eustace and Francis Cockrell; Teleplay by : Robert Creighton Williams	TBA
37	37	"The Mine"	Unknown	Story by : Teleplay by :	June 17, 1958
38	38	"Invisible Enemy"	Charles F. Haas	Story by : Teleplay by : Frederic Louis Fox and Robert Leslie Bellem	June 24, 1958
39	39	"Wire's End"	John H. Peyser	Story by : Teleplay by : Robert Leslie Bellem	TBA

=== Season 2 (1959) ===
No. overall	No. in season	Title	Directed by	Written by	Original release date
40	1	"Face Of The Moon"	Walter Grauman	Story by : Teleplay by : Robert Bloomfield	May 27, 1959
41	2	"Eye Witness"	Walter E. Grauman	Story by : Teleplay by : Oliver Crawford	June 1, 1959
42	3	"The Hero"	Paul Landres	Story by : Teleplay by : Frederic Louis Fox	June 4, 1959
43	4	"Witness In Terror"	Paul Landres	Story by : Teleplay by : Robert Leslie Bellem	June 9, 1959
44	5	"Man With The Wrong Face"	Unknown	Story by : Teleplay by :	June 12, 1959
45	6	"The Last Holdup"	Unknown	Story by : Teleplay by :	June 17, 1959
46	7	"Daughter Of The Dragon"	Paul Landres	Story by : Robert Leslie Bellem and Wanda Tuchock; Teleplay by : Wanda Tuchock	June 22, 1959
47	8	"The Shaving Mug"	Paul Landres	Story by : Teleplay by : Robert Leslie Bellem	June 25, 1959
48	9	"The Devil's Acres"	Unknown	Story by : Teleplay by :	June 30, 1959
49	10	"Accused"	Unknown	Story by : Robert Leslie Bellem; Teleplay by : Jess Carneol and Kay Lenard	July 3, 1959
50	11	"Hangtree Inn"	Les Goodwins	Story by : Teleplay by : Robert Leslie Bellem	September 2, 1959
51	12	"The Giant"	Unknown	Story by : Teleplay by :	September 10, 1959
52	13	"Stolen Stage"	Unknown	Story by : Teleplay by :	September 16, 1959

== Production ==
The series was created by Peter Packer. Fifty-two 30-minute episodes were produced in 1957-1959, with filming at Corriganville Movie Ranch and 20th Century-Fox. Producers included Alan Armer and Mel Epstein. Directors included Douglas Heyes. Writers included Robert Leslie Bellem.

== Critical response ==
The trade publication Variety said in a review that a gun was unnecessary for the show's hero: "Muscles bulge against his clean white shirt and ham-hock fists advertise his fearsome virility, and he can suppy violence when necessary." It added that Reason's brawny appearance sometimes interfered with the character's "brainy type" image, but "he seems to get by a good part of the time".
