= Golem100 =

1980 science fiction novel by Alfred Bester

Golem^{100}
- Cover of first edition Cover art by Rowena Morrill
- Author: Alfred Bester
- Genre: Science fiction
- Publisher: Simon & Schuster
- Publication date: April 1, 1980

Golem^{100} is a science fiction novel by American writer Alfred Bester. It was published by Simon & Schuster in 1980, and is based on Bester's short story "The Four-Hour Fugue".

== Plot ==
The story is set in 2175 CE in "The Guff", an ugly and violent metropolis grown from the northeastern United States. Corporations run the government; cannibalism is common; and corruption is universal. One character, Droney Lafferty, turns out to be a "celebrated necrophiliac". A "hive" of eight bored wealthy women (who call themselves the "Bee-Women," with Regina the queen bee) thinks that it would be fun to raise the Devil, so they begin to dabble in ancient satanic rituals—much of which Bester portrays through musical notation. Unaware that their rites are succeeding, they do not summon Satan, but instead they create a new, interdimensional demon—the Golem^{100}.

A beast of pure evil, it is raised again each time the group practices their ritual. Growing and expanding each time, it then embarks on a rampage of rape, torture, and murder. The demon is tracked through the physical and spirit worlds by three unusual people. Blaise Shima is a famous chemist with an exceptional sense of smell, which makes him invaluable to his perfumery company. When he begins behaving oddly, taking midnight walks and losing chunks of time to amnesia, the company brings in Gretchen Nunn, a blind woman who can "see" through the eyes of those around her, but can also see into parts of the spectrum beyond the normal human range. She is also an expert in psychodynamics. She repeatedly finds Shima near the crimes which are apparently more violent, more gory, or more special compared with the novel's other violent, gory crimes. Shima eventually proves that his nose is drawn to the death-smell of the Golem^{100}.

A local police officer, Subadar Ind'dni, joins them to determine the cause of the spike in violence. Ind'dni, a high-caste Hindu philosopher, is initially skeptical but is eventually convinced. The investigators take "radioactive isotope" drugs to help them with searching for the Golem^{100}'s origin in an alternate dimension. The Golem^{100} turns out to be a monster from the collective unconscious of the Bee-Women, who have created a monster from their ids. Gretchen takes over from Regina in the position of hive queen, and they mutilate and murder Shima. The power of the Golem^{100} ultimately possesses Ind'dni, and he becomes the Golem^{101}.

== Composition ==
Brian Stableford wrote in a 1981 book review about a possible background for the plot. Bester's first two novels, The Demolished Man and The Stars My Destination, "borrowed their narrative structures from other works (Crime and Punishment and The Count of Monte Cristo) but Bester's third sf novel, Extro, went off the rails apparently because the author had to make it up as he went; rumour has it that Golem 100 started out attempting to borrow the narrative frame of Dracula, but if that ever was the case it seems that Bester very soon lost the thread."

== Style ==
Stableford observed in his review, "Bester has always been a melodramatic writer, keen to dazzle and shock his readers. He makes his claims on our attention mainly by the audacity with which he deploys his ideas and the flamboyant decoration of his characters and their environments." For Bester, it wasn't just about the story, it was also about how the story appeared on the page. In a 2012 essay, William Gibson recalled his discovery of Bester's The Stars My Destination, which "had text with letters going all swirly across the page. Not illustrations, but the actual words in the story turning into pictures. That was Alfred Bester, emulating synesthesia..."

Bester's lifelong playful approach to type and font begins here. The title's use of a superscript elevates the monster's strength—demonic to the 100th power. Readers can see this theme continued with the mathematical equations used to describe the characters in the opening scene and the musical notations in the Bee-Women's demon-raising rituals.

Similarly, the way that Bester uses non-alphanumeric features of the keyboard, or straggles dialogue at different angles across the page, appears in others of his stories, notably in his first novel The Demolished Man, in which the Atkins family spells their name @kins and the surname Wygand is spelled Wyg&, and the sentences in a conversation among telepathic people is displayed as a lattice of rights, lefts, ups, downs, and diagonals. The Stars My Destination likewise brightens the text with spangles, asterisked (***) boxes, and typography in colored ink (green, red and indigo). In Golem^{100}, as the investigators delve into their pursuit of the killer, the text uses changing fonts and becomes intertwined with illustrations by Jack Gaughan.

Bester's diction always featured the hipster slang of the 1940s and '50s—or neologisms which suggest it—but here he adds stream-of-consciousness narration, new to his oeuvre since his short story "Fondly Fahrenheit".

== Critical response ==
The novel is based on Bester's 1974 short story "The Four-Hour Fugue", which had been a finalist for the 1975 Hugo Award for Best Short Story. Literary scholar Walter E. Meyers had called it "an excellent example of the mixing of science with fiction that, when done well, defines the genre for many of its readers."

Arthur D. Hlavaty, an editor of The New York Review of Science Fiction, wrote that Bester's return to writing science fiction was "an unintentional example of his own theme of the unrecoverability of the past", with The Computer Connection being "a major disappointment", and Golem^{100} being "worse, nasty as well as incoherent." Hlavaty mentioned having been informed by Charles Platt that Bester provided his own illustrations, but that these were unusable for copyright reasons.

D. Harlan Wilson, in his 2022 monograph on The Stars My Destination, goes through the same points at greater length and describes how authors and readers of science fiction's literary New Wave enthusiastically welcomed Bester's return. "This final stage of his career included his most experimental SF novels: The Computer Connection (1975), Golem^{100} (1980), and The Deceivers (1981). None of them came close to generating the buzz and acclaim of Stars or Demolished, and whereas Bester contended that Golem^{100} was 'beyond a doubt' his best book... they were all widely criticized for a variety of reasons, above all authorial self-indulgence and complicated plotlines. In fact, these later novels are each underrated in their own right. Readers came down on them because what they really wanted was a repackaging of Demolished and Stars."

Kirkus Reviews wrote, "Outrageous, erratic, brilliant Bester is back—with a generous, ultimately unsatisfying mix of fantasy, occult, science-fiction, and psycho-babble... There is much to be admired in this fantasy—its satire and spontaneity—but somewhere along the line the high spirits congeal into massive self-indulgence and an attractively literate talent slips into doggerel. A juicy curiosity that only diehard golem-watchers will want to see through to the mangled finale." China Miéville described it as "an extraordinary, troublesome, sometimes sadistic work that will shock you with its grotesquerie and sexual violence, but also, with a less uneasy tremor, with its disrespect for text. Several early pages are taken up by a musical score, but Chapter 13 is the revelation. It is structured by Jack Gaughan's full-page illustrations, around and through which words must find their way. The images are the engine, organizing what language there is, invoking awe and, on the last page, an irruption of sudden textless terror... [a] nastily visionary S.F. dystopia."

David Langford called the book "truly dire", and Brian Stableford went further, calling it "a positively repellent book". What repelled him was how Bester "invites the reader to join him in an orgy of self-indulgence which revels gluttonously in slaughter and sexual extravagance;" and Stableford concludes, "This is a rank bad book in unbelievably bad taste, without any obvious trace of redeeming artistry, which may well do irreparable damage to the reputation of the author."

Peter Nicholls wrote in The Encyclopedia of Science Fiction that it was "more ambitious, had a more authentic Bester flavour" than the previous book, "and was perhaps surprisingly regarded by Bester as his best novel". Nicholls calls it "an extraordinary but overheated tale of the jungle of New York in 2175 CE, with diabolism, depth psychology (a Monster from the Id), bee superwomen, pheromones, perverse sex, and overall a miasma of death. But the 1960s-style radicalism now looked a little out of date, and what used to be spare and sinewy in his work had begun to seem prolix; the craziness looked like ornamentation rather than what it once was, structural."
