= Virtual Unrealities =

1997 collection of short stories by Alfred Bester

- Author: Alfred Bester
- Cover artist: Evan Gaffney
- Language: English
- Genre: Science fiction
- Publisher: Random House
- Publication date: 1997
- Publication place: United States
- Media type: Print (paperback)
- ISBN: 0-679-76783-5

Virtual Unrealities is a collection of science fiction short stories by the American author Alfred Bester, with an introduction by Robert Silverberg.

== Contents ==
- "Disappearing Act" (originally published in 1953)
- "Oddy and Id" (originally published in 1950 under the title "The Devil’s Invention")
- "Star Light, Star Bright" (originally published in 1953, used as the title for two other compilations of Bester's short stories)
- "5,271,009" (originally published in 1954)
- "Fondly Fahrenheit" (originally published in 1954)
- "Hobson's Choice" (originally published in 1952)
- "Of Time and Third Avenue" (originally published in 1952)
- "Time is the Traitor" (originally published in 1953)
- "The Men Who Murdered Mohammed" (originally published in 1958) (Hugo Award Nominee)
- "The Pi Man" (originally published in 1959) (Hugo Award Nominee)
- "They Don't Make Life Like They Used To" (originally published in 1963)
- "Will You Wait?" (originally published in 1959)
- "The Flowered Thundermug" (originally published in 1964)
- "Adam and No Eve" (originally published in 1941)
- "And 3 1/2 to Go" (fragment - previously unpublished)
- "Galatea Galante" (originally published in 1979)
- "The Devil Without Glasses" (previously unpublished)
