= Starburst (Alfred Bester) =

- Cover of first edition
- Author: Alfred Bester
- Cover artist: Richard M. Powers
- Language: English
- Genre: Science fiction
- Publisher: Signet Books
- Publication date: 1958
- Publication place: United States
- Media type: Print (paperback)
- Pages: 160 pp

Starburst is a collection of science fiction stories by the American writer Alfred Bester, originally published in paperback by Signet Books in 1958. Signet issued at least four reprint editions of this collection over more than twenty years; British editions were published by Sphere Books and Pan Books.

== Contents ==
- "Disappearing Act" (Star 1953)
- "Adam and No Eve" (Astounding 1941)
- "Star Light, Star Bright" (F&SF 1953)
- "The Roller Coaster" (Fantastic 1953)
- "Oddy and Id" (Astounding 1950)
- "The Starcomber" (F&SF 1954)
- "Travel Diary" (original)
- "Fondly Fahrenheit" (F&SF 1954)
- "Hobson’s Choice" (F&SF 1952)
- "The Die-Hard" (original)
- "Of Time and Third Avenue" (F&SF 1951)

"Oddy and Id" was originally published as "The Devil's Invention". "The Starcomber" was originally published as "5,271,009".

== Reception ==
Anthony Boucher praised Starburst as "one of the most notable single-author collections ever published in our field".
