= Redemolished =

- First edition
- Author: Alfred Bester
- Cover artist: Simon Danaher
- Language: English
- Genre: Science fiction
- Publisher: iBooks, inc
- Publication date: 2000
- Publication place: United States
- Media type: Print (paperback)
- ISBN: 0-7434-8679-X

Redemolished is a collection of short stories, interviews, and other articles and essays by science fiction author Alfred Bester. The collection was published in 2000 (thirteen years after Bester's death) by iBooks.

Redemolished contains the following short stories:

- "The Probable Man"
- "Hell Is Forever"
- "The Push of a Finger"
- "The Roller Coaster"
- "The Lost Child"
- "I'll Never Celebrate New Year's Again"
- "Out of This World"
- "The Animal Fair"
- "Something Up There Likes Me"
- "The Four-Hour Fugue"

The collection also contains three fictional articles published in Holiday Magazine:

- "Gourmet Dining in Outer Space"
- "Place of the Month: The Moon"
- "The Sun"

The collection also includes four essays:

- "Science Fiction and the Renaissance Man", originally delivered as a lecture at the University of Chicago in 1957. The other lecturers included Cyril Kornbluth, Robert A. Heinlein, and Robert Bloch.
- "A Diatribe Against Science Fiction"
- "The Perfect Composite Science Fiction Author"
- "My Affair with Science Fiction"

The following items are also included:

- interviews with John Huston and Rex Stout
- a conversation with Woody Allen
- brief articles on Isaac Asimov and Robert A. Heinlein
- two deleted prologues and an analysis of The Demolished Man
- a memorial for Bester written by Isaac Asimov, with an introduction by Gregory S. Benford

== Reception ==
Peter Heck of Asimov's Science Fiction wrote that "This is probably not the place for a reader unfamiliar with Bester to begin; that would be (for my money) either The Stars My Destination or a selection of his short stories including such classics as “Fondly Fahrenheit” and “The Men Who Murdered Mohammed.” But for those who know the major works and want as much Bester as they can get, this is just the thing".
