= 1959 in American television =

This is a list of American television-related events in 1959.

== Events ==
Date	Event	Ref.
April 6	The original KYW-TV (now WKYC-TV) in Cleveland, Ohio becomes the first station in the United States to use the Eyewitness News brand for their newscasts.	
June 16	Adventures of Superman star George Reeves dies by a gunshot at the age of 45. While the official finding would be suicide, but some would later believe that he was actually murdered or the victim of an accidental shooting.	
November 29	As part of the Sunday Showcase on NBC, the Grammy Awards were broadcast for the first time ever.	

== Television programs ==
=== Debuts ===
Date	Debut	Network
January 9	Rawhide	CBS
January 10	Black Saddle	NBC
January 12	The Bell Telephone Hour	NBC
January 20	Alcoa Presents: One Step Beyond	ABC
March 9	Clutch Cargo	Broadcast syndication
March 10	Alex in Wonderland	NTA Film Network
April 5	Pete Kelly's Blues	NBC
April 16	The Lawless Years	NBC
May 2	Markham	CBS
September 8	Bucky and Pepito	Broadcast syndication
September 8	Tales of the Vikings	Broadcast syndication
September 8	Tightrope!	CBS
September 10	Johnny Staccato	NBC
September 12	The Deputy	NBC
September 12	The Man and the Challenge	NBC
September 13	Riverboat	NBC
September 15	Bonanza	NBC
September 15	Laramie	NBC
September 19	Augie Doggie and Doggie Daddy	Broadcast syndication
September 19	Snooper and Blabber	Broadcast syndication
September 20	NBC Sunday Showcase	NBC
September 21	The DuPont Show with June Allyson	CBS
September 21	Love and Marriage	NBC
September 26	Lock-Up	Broadcast syndication
September 28	Hennesey	CBS
September 28	The Quick Draw McGraw Show	Broadcast syndication
September 29	The Many Loves of Dobie Gillis	CBS
September 30	Charley Weaver's Hobby Lobby	ABC
September 30	Men Into Space	CBS
September 30	Wichita Town	NBC
October 1	The Betty Hutton Show	CBS
October 1	Johnny Ringo	CBS
October 1	Law of the Plainsman	NBC
October 2	Hotel de Paree	CBS
October 2	The Twilight Zone	CBS
October 3	Five Fingers	NBC
October 4	The Alaskans	ABC
October 4	Dennis the Menace	CBS
October 4	The Rebel	ABC
October 5	Adventures in Paradise	ABC
October 5	Bourbon Street Beat	ABC
October 6	Philip Marlowe	ABC
October 6	Startime	NBC
October 7	Hawaiian Eye	ABC
October 11	Matty's Funday Funnies	ABC
October 12	The Play of the Week	NTA Film Network
October 15	The Untouchables	ABC
October 16	The Detectives	ABC
October 22	Take a Good Look	ABC
October 24	Mr. Lucky	CBS
October 24	Shotgun Slade	Broadcast syndication
November 19	The Adventures of Rocky and Bullwinkle and Friends	ABC
Unknown date	This Man Dawson	Syndication

=== Ending this year ===
Date	Program	Network	First aired	Notes/References
January 13	Confession	ABC	1957	
January 14	Pursuit	CBS	October 22, 1958	
March 8	Sky King	Syndication	September 16, 1951	
March 13	Northwest Passage	NBC	September 14, 1958	
March 25	Flight	Syndication	November 4, 1958	
March 27	Schlitz Playhouse of Stars	CBS	October 5, 1951	
April 4	Cimarron City	NBC	September 27, 1958	
April 9	Behind Closed Doors	NBC	October 2, 1958	
April 14	The George Burns Show	NBC	October 21, 1958	
April 27	Your Hit Parade	CBS	July 10, 1950	Returned in 1974
May	The Milton Berle Show	ABC	June 8, 1948 (on NBC)	
May 7	December Bride	CBS	October 4, 1954	
May 25	Buckskin	NBC	July 3, 1958	
May 26	The Californians	NBC	September 24, 1957	
June	Alex in Wonderland	NTA Film Network	March 10, 1959	
June 3	Frontier Doctor	Syndication	September 26, 1958	
June 4	Yancy Derringer	ABC	October 2, 1958	
June 19	Haggis Baggis	NBC	June 30, 1958	
June 22	The Restless Gun	NBC	September 23, 1957	
June 25	The Mickey Mouse Club	ABC	October 3, 1955	Returned in first-run syndication in 1977
June 25	State Trooper	Syndication	September 25, 1956	
June 30	26 Men	Syndication	November 1, 1957	
July 2	Zorro	ABC	October 10, 1957	
July 5	Pete Kelly's Blues	NBC	April 5, 1959	
July 13	Cannonball	Syndication	October 6, 1958	
July 24	Bonomo, The Magic Clown	WNTA	September 11, 1949 (on NBC)	
August	This Is Alice	NTA Film Network	October 1959	
August 20	How to Marry a Millionaire	NTA Film Network	October 7, 1957	
August 23	Dragnet	NBC	December 16, 1951	Returned in 1967 (in color)
August 28	The Thin Man	NBC	September 20, 1957	
September 10	Man Without a Gun	NTA Film Network	November 6, 1957	
September 23	Trackdown	CBS	October 4, 1957	
September 24	The Rough Riders	ABC	October 2, 1958	
September 28	Polka Go-Round	ABC	June 23, 1958	
October 9	Pantomime Quiz	ABC	November 13, 1947 (on KTLA)	Returned in 1962 as "Stump the Stars" on CBS
November 28	Mickey Spillane's Mike Hammer	Syndication	January 7, 1958	
Unknown date	Confession	Syndication	October 7, 1953 (on DuMont)	
Unknown date	Mackenzie's Raiders	Syndication	October 1, 1958	
Unknown date	Tom Terrific	CBS	June 10, 1957	

=== Made-for-TV movies and miniseries ===
Title	Premiere date	Network
The Hate That Hate Produced	July 13–17	WNTA-TV
The Jazz Singer	October 13	NBC
The Turn of the Screw	October 20	NBC
The Moon and Sixpence	October 30	NBC
Murder and the Android	November 8	NBC

== Television stations ==
=== Station launches ===
Date	Market	Station	Channel	Affiliation	Notes/References
January 12	Tulsa, Oklahoma	KOED-TV	11	NET	
February 2	Oklahoma City, Oklahoma	KOKH-TV	25	Non-commercial independent	Now a Fox affiliate
February 23	Sacramento, California	KVIE	6	NET	
March 8	Tucson, Arizona	KUAT	6	NET	
March 15	Lansing, Michigan	WILX-TV	10	NBC	
March 30	Buffalo, New York	WNED-TV	17	NET	
April	Colby/Goodland, Kansas	KLOE-TV	10	CBS	
April 23	Champaign/Decatur, Illinois	WCHU-TV	33	NBC	Now on Channel 15
April 26	Goodland, Kansas	KLOE-TV	10	CBS (primary); ABC (secondary)	Now a fulltime CBS affiliate as a semi-satellite of KWCH-DT of Hutchinson, Kansas
April 27	Des Moines, Iowa	KDPS-TV	11	NET	Part of Iowa Public Television
April 28	St. Louis, Missouri	KPLR-TV	11	Independent	Now an affiliate of The CW
May 16	Cheboygan, Michigan	WTOM-TV	4	NBC (primary); ABC (secondary)	Satellite of WPBN/Traverse City, Michigan
July 3	Pocatello, Idaho	KTLE	6	Independent	
July 6	Durham/Manchester, New Hampshire	WENH-TV	11	NET via New Hampshire Public Television	
August 1	Huntsville, Alabama	WAFG-TV	31	ABC	
October 11	Fargo, North Dakota	KXGO-TV	11	ABC	
October 14	Cincinnati, Ohio	WMUB-TV	14	NET	
October 15	Yakima, Washington	KNDO	23	ABC (primary); CBS/NBC (secondary)	
October 20	Greenwood, Mississippi	WABG-TV	6	CBS	
November 1	Sacramento, California	KVUE	40	Independent	
November 8	Bakersfield, California	KLYD-TV	17	ABC	
Unknown date	Colby/Goodland, Kansas	KOMC	8	NBC	

=== Network affiliation changes ===
Date	Market	Station	Channel	Old affiliation	New affiliation	References
April 1	Milwaukee, Wisconsin	WITI	6	Independent (primary); NTA Film Network (secondary)	CBS (primary); NTA Film Network (secondary)	
April 1	Milwaukee, Wisconsin	WXIX-TV	18	CBS	Independent	
April 26	Portland, Oregon	KGW	8	ABC	NBC	
April 26	Portland, Oregon	KPTV	12	NBC	ABC	
August 1	Huntsville, Alabama	WMSL-TV	48	NBC (primary); ABC (secondary)	NBC (exclusive)	WMSL lost ABC affiliate upon the sign on of WAAY-TV, but would swap affiliations with WAAY-TV in 1968. Channel 48 as WYUR-TV (now WAFF-TV) would return to NBC on a fulltime basis in 1977.
August 22	Green Bay, Wisconsin	WFRV-TV	5	ABC	NBC	Switch was reversed in 1983
August 22	Green Bay, Wisconsin	WLUK-TV	11	NBC	ABC	Switch was reversed in 1983
October 11	Valley City/Fargo, North Dakota	KXJB-TV	4	CBS (primary); ABC (secondary)	CBS (exclusive)	
October 15	Yakima, Washington	KIMA-TV	29	CBS (primary); ABC (secondary)	CBS (exclusive)	
November 8	Bakersfield, California	KBAK-TV	29	CBS (primary); ABC (secondary)	CBS (exclusive)	Secondary ABC affiliation went to NBC affiliate KLYD-TV when it signed on.
December	Greenwood, Mississippi	WABG-TV	6	CBS	ABC	
Unknown date	Bangor, Maine	WABI-TV	5	NBC (primary); ABC/CBS/NTA Film Network (secondary)	CBS (primary); ABC/NTA Film Network (secondary)	
Unknown date	Bangor, Maine	WLBZ-TV	2	CBS (exclusive)	NBC (primary); ABC (secondary)	
Unknown date	Hampton/Norfolk, Virginia	WVEC-TV	13	NBC	ABC	
Unknown date	Portsmouth/Norfolk, Virginia	WAVY-TV	10	ABC	NBC	
Unknown date	Presque Isle, Maine	WAGM-TV	8	NBC (primary); CBS/ABC (secondary)	CBS (primary); NBC/ABC (secondary)	

=== Station closures ===
Date	City of license/Market	Station	Channel	Affiliation	First air date	Notes/Ref.
April 26	Portland, Oregon	KGW	8	ABC	NBC	
April 26	Portland, Oregon	KPTV	12	NBC	ABC	
May 27	Kalispell, Montana	KULR	9	Independent	October 20, 1958	
August 25	Nacogdoches, Texas	KTES	19	Independent	September 20, 1958	
October 30	Norfolk, Virginia	WTOV-TV	27	ABC	October 22, 1953	
Unknown date	Lock Haven/Scranton/Wilkes-Barre, Pennsylvania	WBPZ-TV	32	ABC (primary); NBC (secondary)	March 1958	

== See also ==
- 1959 in television
- 1959 in film
- 1959 in the United States
- List of American films of 1959
