= Assignment in Tomorrow =

1954 anthology edited by Frederik Pohl

- Dust-jacket from the first edition
- Editor: Frederik Pohl
- Cover artist: Richard M. Powers
- Language: English
- Genre: Science fiction
- Publisher: Hanover House
- Publication date: 1954
- Publication place: United States
- Media type: Print (hardback)
- Pages: 317
- OCLC: 220613132

Assignment in Tomorrow is an anthology of science fiction stories edited by American writer Frederik Pohl. Originally published in hardcover by Hanover House in 1954 with jacket art by Richard M. Powers, it was reprinted in paperback by Lancer Books in 1972.

== Contents ==
- "Mr. Costello, Hero" by Theodore Sturgeon (Galaxy 1953)
- "Angels in the Jets" by Jerome Bixby (Fantastic 1952)
- "The Adventurer" by C. M. Kornbluth (Space Science Fiction 1953)
- "Subterfuge" by Ray Bradbury (Astonishing Stories 1943)
- "Helen O'Loy" by Lester del Rey (Astounding 1938)
- "5,271,009" by Alfred Bester (F&SF 1954)
- "The Big Trip Up Yonder" by Kurt Vonnegut, Jr. (Galaxy 1954)
- "We Don’t Want Any Trouble" by James H. Schmitz (Galaxy 1953)
- "The Peddler’s Nose" by Jack Williamson (Astounding 1951)
- "The Frightened Tree" by Algis Budrys (Galaxy 1953)
- "A Matter of Form" by Horace L. Gold (Astounding 1938)
- "Back to Julie" by Richard Wilson (Galaxy 1954)
- "She Who Laughs..." by Peter Phillips (Galaxy 1952)
- "Official Record" by Fletcher Pratt (Space Science Fiction 1952)
- "Hall of Mirrors" by Fredric Brown (Galaxy 1953)
- "Mother" by Philip José Farmer (Thrilling Wonder Stories 1953)

"The Frightened Tree" was originally published under the title "Protective Mimicry".

== Reception ==
The New York Times reviewer J. Francis McComas found the anthology "a mild disappointment," noting that while some of the contents were "superb stories", several stories were "a bit overfamiliar", while others were "either too conventional in concept or flat in execution." P. Schuyler Miller, however, rated it "one of the best anthologies of 1954."
