= Star Light, Star Bright (disambiguation) =

"Star Light, Star Bright" is an English language nursery rhyme of American origin.

Star Light, Star Bright may also refer to:

- Star Light, Star Bright (book), a science fiction story collection by Alfred Bester
  - "Star Light, Star Bright" (short story), one of the stories in the collection
- "Star Light, Star Bright" (Quantum Leap), a television episode
