= Things That Go Bump in the Night =

Things That Go Bump in the Night may refer to:

== Television ==
- "Things That Go Bump in the Night" (Dad's Army), a 1973 episode of the British television Dad's Army
- Things That Go Bump in the Night (TV series), a 1974 Australian anthology series
- "Things That Go Bump in the Night", an episode of Rising Damp
- "Things That Go Bump in the Night", an episode of In a Heartbeat
- "Things That Go Bump in the Night", an episode of Midsomer Murders
- "Things That Go Bump in the Night", an episode of The Bill
- Things That Go Bump in the Night, a 1989 TV film by Christine Cromwell starring Jaclyn Smith

== Other uses ==
- And Things That Go Bump in the Night, a play by Terrence McNally
- Things That Go Bump in the Night, a 1960s band of which Eric Carr was a member
- "Things That Go Bump in the Night" (Allstars song), a song by Allstars
- Things That Go Bump in the Night, a 1943 Starman story arc from DC Comics
- Things That Go Bump in the Night Film Festival, a film festival in Bay City, Michigan

== See also ==
- Things That Go Pump in the Night, a 1990 music video by Aerosmith
- "Things That Go Piglet in the Night", an episode of The New Adventures of Winnie the Pooh
- "Things That Go Glug in the Night", an episode of Everything's Rosie
- Bogeyman
- Bump in the Night (disambiguation)
- Personalities and Things that Go Bump in the Night, a set of scale model miniatures
- Things That Go Bump (disambiguation)
