= Isaac Asimov Presents The Great SF Stories 15 (1953) =

- First edition
- Editors: Isaac Asimov; Martin H. Greenberg
- Cover artist: Tony Roberts
- Language: English
- Series: Isaac Asimov Presents The Great SF Stories
- Genre: Science fiction
- Publisher: DAW Books
- Publication date: December 1986
- Publication place: United States
- Media type: Print (hardback & paperback)
- Preceded by: Isaac Asimov Presents The Great SF Stories 14 (1952)
- Followed by: Isaac Asimov Presents The Great SF Stories 16 (1954)

Isaac Asimov Presents The Great SF Stories 15 (1953) is the fifteenth volume of Isaac Asimov Presents The Great SF Stories, which is a series of short story collections, edited by Isaac Asimov and Martin H. Greenberg, that attempts to include the best science fiction stories from the Golden Age of Science Fiction. The editors date the "Golden Age" as beginning in 1939 and ending in 1963. This volume was originally published by DAW books in December 1986.

== Contents ==
- "The Big Holiday" by Fritz Leiber
- "Crucifixus Etiam" by Walter M. Miller, Jr.
- "Four in One" by Damon Knight
- "A Saucer of Loneliness" by Theodore Sturgeon
- "The Liberation of Earth" by William Tenn
- "Lot" by Ward Moore
- "The Nine Billion Names of God" by Arthur C. Clarke
- "Warm" by Robert Sheckley
- "Impostor" by Philip K. Dick
- "The World Well Lost" by Theodore Sturgeon
- "A Bad Day for Sales" by Fritz Leiber
- "Common Time" by James Blish
- "Time is the Traitor" by Alfred Bester
- "The Wall Around the World" by Theodore R. Cogswell
- "The Model of a Judge" by William Morrison
- "Hall of Mirrors" by Fredric Brown
- "It's a Good Life" by Jerome Bixby
