= Computer connection =

Computer connection or Computer connections may refer to:

- The Computer Connection, a 1975 science fiction novel by Alfred Bester
- Computer Connections: People, Places, and Events in the Evolution of the Personal Computer Industry, a 1993 book by Gary Kildall
