= Isaac Asimov Presents The Great SF Stories 16 (1954) =

- First edition
- Editors: Isaac Asimov; Martin H. Greenberg
- Cover artist: Angus McKie
- Language: English
- Series: Isaac Asimov Presents The Great SF Stories
- Genre: Science fiction
- Publisher: DAW Books
- Publication date: May 1987
- Publication place: United States
- Media type: Print (hardback & paperback)
- Preceded by: Isaac Asimov Presents The Great SF Stories 15 (1953)
- Followed by: Isaac Asimov Presents The Great SF Stories 17 (1955)

Isaac Asimov Presents The Great SF Stories 16 (1954) is the sixteenth volume of Isaac Asimov Presents The Great SF Stories, which is a series of short story collections, edited by Isaac Asimov and Martin H. Greenberg, which attempts to list the great science fiction stories from the Golden Age of Science Fiction. They date the Golden Age as beginning in 1939 and lasting until 1963. This volume was originally published by DAW books in May 1987.

== Contents ==
- "The Test" by Richard Matheson
- "Anachron" by Damon Knight
- "Black Charlie" by Gordon R. Dickson
- "Down Among the Dead Men" by William Tenn
- "The Hunting Lodge" by Randall Garrett
- "The Lysenko Maze" by Donald A. Wollheim
- "Fondly Fahrenheit" by Alfred Bester
- "The Cold Equations" by Tom Godwin
- "Letters from Laura" by Mildred Clingerman
- "Transformer" by Chad Oliver
- "The Music Master of Babylon" by Edgar Pangborn
- "The End of Summer" by Algis Budrys
- "The Father-thing" by Philip K. Dick
- "The Deep Range" by Arthur C. Clarke
- "Balaam" by Anthony Boucher
- "Man of Parts" by H. L. Gold
- "Answer" by Fredric Brown
