= Star Light, Star Bright (book) =

1976 collection of science fiction short stories by Alfred Bester

Star Light, Star Bright: The Short Fiction Of Alfred Bester, Volume 2
- First edition
- Author: Alfred Bester
- Cover artist: Richard M. Powers
- Language: English
- Genre: Science fiction
- Publisher: Berkley / G. P. Putnam
- Publication date: 1976
- Publication place: United States
- Media type: Hardcover
- Pages: 248
- ISBN: 978-0-399-11816-6
- Preceded by: The Light Fantastic: The Short Fiction Of Alfred Bester, Volume 1

Star Light, Star Bright is a collection of science fiction short stories by American writer Alfred Bester, first published in 1976.

== Contents ==
- "Adam and No Eve"
- "Time Is the Traitor"
- "Oddie And Id"
- "Hobson's Choice"
- "Star Light, Star Bright"
- "They Don't Make Life Like They Used To"
- "Of Time and Third Avenue"
- "The Pi Man"
- "Something Up There Likes Me"
