= Things That Go Bump =

Things That Go Bump may refer to:

- Things That Go Bump (plays), a 2008 trilogy of plays by Alan Ayckbourn
- "Things That Go Bump", a 2007 episode of The Dresden Files
- "Things That Go Bump", a 2007 episode of Shaun the Sheep
- "Things That Go Bump", a 2004 episode of Powers

== See also ==
- Things That Go Bump in the Night (disambiguation)
