= The Men Who Murdered Mohammed =

Short story by Alfred Bester

"The Men Who Murdered Mohammed" is a science fiction short story by American writer Alfred Bester. It was first published in The Magazine of Fantasy and Science Fiction in October 1958. It has been translated into French, Italian, Spanish, Portuguese, and German, and has been reprinted nine times, most recently in Virtual Unrealities (1997).

== Synopsis ==
When mad scientist Henry Hassel discovers his wife in the midst of committing adultery, he decides that simple murder would be intellectually unsatisfying; he therefore builds a time machine with the intention of killing his wife's grandparents in their youth, so that she will never have existed. When he returns to the present, however, nothing has changed. In a desperate attempt to alter history, Hassel begins killing historical figures of greater and greater significance (eventually including Mohammed, thus the story's title), only to learn that the nature of time is very different from what he had thought.

== Critical reception ==
"Mohammed" was nominated for the 1959 Hugo Award for Best Short Story, and The New York Review of Science Fiction describes it as a "final development" to the theme of time travel in Bester's work.

Connie Willis described it as "very funny" and one of her favorite time-travel stories (while misattributing it to Harry Harrison), and Jo Walton categorized it as "excellent" and "thought provoking", and specified that it is "(v)ery clever, very funny, and quite chilling when you think about it."
