= The Pi Man =

1959 science fiction short story by Alfred Bester

"The Pi Man" is a science fiction short story by American writer Alfred Bester. It was first published in Fantasy and Science Fiction, in 1959. Bester subsequently revised it extensively for his 1976 collection Star Light, Star Bright, changing the characters' names, "develop(ing) minor scenes", modifying the typographical "word pictures", and deleting several "stale references to beatnik culture".

== Synopsis ==
Peter Marko's superhuman abilities of pattern recognition have allowed him to make a fortune in forex arbitrage; however, they also compel him to balance out the behaviors of the rest of the world by constantly performing seemingly-random acts of good and evil. This draws him into conflict, first with his secretary, and then with the FBI.

== Reception ==
"The Pi Man" was a finalist for the 1960 Hugo Award for Best Short Fiction.

Kirkus Reviews considered it to be a "chilling masterpiece", and John Hertz has lauded it as "coruscating, gripping, (and) strange".

The Encyclopedia of Science Fiction has posited that Marko's abilities were the basis for the similar abilities of the protagonist in Bester's 1981 novel The Deceivers, while James Nicoll has noted that the story would work just as well if one assumes that Marko's "justifications for atrocity are insane delusions".

David N. Samuelson, writing in Science Fiction Studies, analyzed the story as hard science fiction, and observed that it is based on "mathematical oddities" and "lacks a clear empirical base".
