= Helen O'Loy =

1938 short story by Lester del Rey

- Short story by Lester del Rey
- Country: United States
- Language: English
- Genre(s): Science fiction

Publication
- Published in: Astounding Science Fiction
- Media type: Print (Magazine)
- Publication date: 1938

"Helen O'Loy" is a science fiction short story by American writer Lester del Rey (1915–1993), originally published in 1938 in Astounding Science Fiction.

It was subsequently published many times in various collections or anthologies. The latest publication was in 2021, in the anthology We, Robots.

== Plot summary ==
Two young men, a mechanic, Dave, and a medical student, Phil, collaborate on modifying a household robot, originally meant only to cook and clean. They are more successful than they intended; despite the robot's household programming, it develops emotions. The robot, named "Helen O'Loy" (a play on Helen of Troy and "alloy"), falls in love with Dave. Dave initially avoids her and rejects her advances, but after some time he marries her and they live together on his farm.

Over the years Phil assists her in artificially aging her features to match the changes that occur in her human husband. When Dave inevitably dies, she sends a letter to Phil saying that she intends to drink a powerful acid which will destroy her internal metallic structure and will appear to be suicide by poisoning. She asks that Phil bury her remains with her husband. She begs him not to let anyone discover their secret. In the final line it is revealed that Phil, who has been narrating the story, had secretly been in love with her the whole time.

== Reception ==
"Helen O'Loy" was among the stories selected in 1970 by the Science Fiction Writers of America as one of the best science fiction short stories published before the creation of the Nebula Awards. As such, it was published in The Science Fiction Hall of Fame Volume One, 1929–1964.

It was also a nominee for the 1939 Retro Hugo award for best short story.

The story is compiled in an anthology of science fiction stories, Assignment in Tomorrow (1954, reprinted 1972), edited by Frederik Pohl, as well as in many other anthologies.
