= Bump in the Night =

Bump in the Night may refer to:

- Bump in the Night (TV series), a 1994 U.S. animated TV series
- Bump in the Night (album), a 1981 album by Ian McLagan
- Bump in the Night, a 1960 novel by Colin Watson in the Flaxborough series of crime novels
- Bump in the Night (novel), a 1988 novel by Isabelle Holland
  - Bump in the Night (film), a 1991 film based on the novel
- "Bump in the Night" (Ghosts), a 2020 television episode

== See also ==
- Things That Go Bump in the Night (disambiguation)
