= Psychoshop =

1998 science fiction novel by Alfred Bester and Roger Zelazny

- Cover illustration from the first edition
- Author: Alfred Bester and Roger Zelazny
- Cover artist: Evan Gaffney
- Language: English
- Genre: Science fiction
- Publisher: Vintage
- Publication date: July 1998
- Publication place: United States
- Media type: Print (paperback)
- Pages: 207
- ISBN: 0-679-76782-7
- OCLC: 38527796
- Dewey Decimal: 813/.54 21
- LC Class: PS3552.E796 P78 1998

Psychoshop is a science fiction novel started by American writers Alfred Bester and Roger Zelazny. Started by the former before his death 1987, it was completed by Zelazny and published posthumously in 1998 by Random House (under their Vintage imprint). Zelazny had in turn died in 1995.

== Sources ==
- "Books, Listed by Author (BERKEY–BETANCOURT)". The Locus Index to Science Fiction. Locus. Archived from the original on March 5, 2007.
