= The Deceivers (Bester novel) =

1981 science fiction novel by American writer Alfred Bester

- Cover of first edition
- Author: Alfred Bester
- Cover artist: Michael Whelan
- Language: English
- Genre: Science fiction
- Publisher: Simon & Schuster
- Publication date: October 1981
- Publication place: United States
- Media type: Print (paperback)
- Pages: 272
- ISBN: 0-671-43432-2
- OCLC: 8589190

The Deceivers is a science fiction novel by American writer Alfred Bester. It was first published in 1981 by Wallaby Books (an imprint of Simon & Schuster).

== Synopsis ==
Rogue Winter has superhuman powers of pattern recognition, which he uses to rescue his kidnapped girlfriend and save the Solar System.

== Reception ==
The Deceivers received little attention from critics; The Encyclopedia of Science Fiction later posited that resulted from a desire to spare Bester's feelings, since the novel "is not good". Science fiction scholar Jad Smith has described it as a "busy, overwritten pastiche" of Bester's 1956 novel The Stars My Destination. David Langford called it "mildly good fun" and praised Bester's "colourful imagination and general wildness", although declaring it substandard for Bester (while still superior to his other then-recent work): Langford describes its characters as "dilettantes" who "never reach those peaks of sheer obsessiveness which powered the early novels", and noted the presence of "a narrator who removes all possible suspense" by telling readers the ending in advance.
