= Who He? =

1953 novel by Alfred Bester

Who He? (The Rat Race)
- First edition
- Author: Alfred Bester
- Cover artist: H. Lawrence Hoffman
- Genre: Satire
- Publisher: Dial Press
- Publication date: 1953

Who He? (also published as The Rat Race) is a general-fiction novel published in 1953 by Alfred Bester, an author best known for his science fiction. The book was republished in 2007; as of 2015, it is available for purchase from Wildside Press. The novel provides a detailed—if somewhat madcap—view of the early days of television production in New York City, before most of the industry relocated to California.

== Plot summary ==
A television game show writer, waking after an alcoholic blackout, discovers that someone is out to destroy his life.

== Reception ==
In 1954, the editor Groff Conklin advised readers of Galaxy magazine not to miss "Bester's savage picture of television production".
