= Tender Loving Rage =

Book by Alfred Bester

- Cover illustration from the first edition
- Author: Alfred Bester
- Cover artist: Kent Bash
- Language: English
- Genre: Novel
- Publisher: Tafford Publishing
- Publication date: October 1991
- Publication place: United States
- Media type: Print (paperback)
- Pages: 261
- ISBN: 0-9623712-4-6
- OCLC: 24788449

Tender Loving Rage is a novel by American writer Alfred Bester.

== Plot ==
The novel follows Julene Krebs, a model who becomes involved with two men: a successful advertising executive and a prominent research scientist. The two men become acquainted through their mutual interest in Julene, while she develops relationships with both of them. Alongside the romantic storyline, the novel explores the advertising industry and the production of television commercials. As the story progresses, a mysterious figure begins to follow the characters, while details about Julene's past gradually emerge. The events culminate during a violent night on Fire Island, followed by a hurricane and Julene's kidnapping. The characters are subsequently drawn into a series of confrontations involving Julene's past and her relationships with the two men.

== Overview ==
The novel was published posthumously in 1991, four years after Bester's death in 1987. In his 1991 article, "Alfred Bester's Tender Loving Rage", his friend Charles Platt explains that Bester wrote the novel around 1959, using the title Tender Loving Rape. (This article was reprinted in Platt's book Loose Canon [2001].) The book went unsold for many years, until Platt—who had read the manuscript previously, while working at the publisher Avon in 1972—persuaded Bester to allow him to have the book published by a small press. Platt suggested the change of title, and Bester agreed.

== Critical response ==
Arthur D. Hlavaty, a former editor of The New York Review of Science Fiction, described the book as "a mimetic novel called Tender Loving Rape, which was posthumously published with its title minimally but cleverly emended to the less offensive Tender Loving Rage. It is a hologram of his career: brilliant start to sodden, cranky, incoherent conclusion."

Platt wrote that "No one should assume, from the novel's history, that it was a minor work. Like all of Bester's books, it was ambitious: by turns a picaresque journey, a suspense novel, and a love story (this last being something he had never attempted before). It was also a roman-a-clef".
