= Murder and the Android =

1959 television film

Murder and the Android was a television movie based on Fondly Fahrenheit, a 1954 story by Alfred Bester. It was broadcast on November 8, 1959, as an NBC Sunday Showcase production. The film was produced by Robert Alan Aurthur, directed by Alex Segal, and starred Kevin McCarthy, Rip Torn, Vladimir Sokoloff, Suzanne Pleshette and Sono Osato.

In 1960, science fiction author Frederik Pohl called this film, "almost the only first-rate television play on a science fiction theme". It was nominated for the 1960 Hugo Award for Best Dramatic Presentation.

This story is set 400 years in the future, when a man inherits an android. This synthetic being was created in a laboratory as a submissive, obedient construct. Unfortunately, the android malfunctions and attempts to dominate its master.
