= NBC Sunday Showcase =

- Directed by: John Frankenheimer
- Country of origin: United States

Original release
- Network: NBC
- Release: September 20, 1959 – 1960

Barbara Rush, John Forsythe and Larry Blyden in a scene from What Makes Sammy Run? on NBC Sunday Showcase (September 27 and October 4, 1959).

NBC Sunday Showcase is a series of hour-long specials telecast in color on NBC during the 1959–60 season. The flexible anthology format varied weekly from comedies and science fiction to musicals and historical dramas. The recent introduction of videotape made repeats possible, and two 1959 dramas (Murder and the Android and What Makes Sammy Run?) had repeats in 1960.

On the heels of his Broadway hits The Pajama Game and Damn Yankees, Richard Adler composed the opening Sunday Showcase theme music, titled "Sunday Drive" (a.k.a. "Sunday Showcase Theme").

== Premiere ==
For the September 20, 1959 premiere, John Frankenheimer directed S. Lee Pogostin's People Kill People Sometimes with Zina Bethune, Geraldine Page, Jason Robards and George C. Scott.

During the next two weeks, Larry Blyden had the title role in an adaptation of Budd Schulberg's 1941 novel What Makes Sammy Run?. The two-parter was directed by Delbert Mann with music by Irwin Bazelon. The lost reel of this production was found in 2004:

Originally presented on color videotape, the 1959 adaptation of What Makes Sammy Run? was rebroadcast the following year after which the tape was, presumably, reused or discarded. A black and white kinescope of the first hour has long been available for viewing at the Museum of Television and Radio in New York and Los Angeles, but the second half of the broadcast was, for many years, on the Museum's list of "lost treasures." In 2004, writer/director Robert Armin met with actress Dina Merrill to talk about the broadcast. When Ms Merrill, a Trustee of the Museum, learned that the second hour (in which she has her strongest scenes) could not be found, she contacted the Museum's curators, who then made locating the missing footage a priority. At their urging, the Library of Congress, which has a large collection of NBC footage, made a thorough search of its holdings and discovered eight film cans labeled Sunday Showcase which contained a complete kinescope of the entire two-hour broadcast. Now freshly restored, the New York branch of the Museum screened the teleplay before a packed house on April 6, 2005, with Dina Merrill and Budd Schulberg in attendance. This is the first time the film has been viewed publicly since 1960.

On October 11, 1959, Joan Crawford, Helen Hayes, Bob Hope, Mary Martin and Eleanor Roosevelt were seen in A Tribute to Eleanor Roosevelt on Her Diamond Jubilee.

== Science fiction ==
For the October 18 telecast of Murder and the Android, Alfred Bester scripted a teleplay adaptation of his cyber-crime story "Fondly Fahrenheit," first published in The Magazine of Fantasy & Science Fiction (August 1954). The science fiction tale of a rampaging robot took place in the year 2359 amid futuristic sets designed by Ted Cooper. Produced by Robert Alan Aurthur with a cast of Kevin McCarthy, Rip Torn, Suzanne Pleshette and Telly Savalas, the drama was reviewed by radio-television critic John Crosby in his syndicated column:

Despite the fact that the androids refer contemptuously to human beings as people who suffer from glandular disorders called emotions, Torn wants very much to suffer from these disorders himself. Eventually, he does. I have no intention of unraveling the whole plot which was not so much complicated as psychologically dense. If I understand him correctly, Mr. Bester is trying to say that having androids to free us of mundane preoccupations like work is by no means good for us. His humans are pretty close to being bums.

Julie Harris and Maximilian Schell in Alfred Bester's Turn the Key Deftly on NBC Sunday Showcase March 5, 1960.

Murder and the Android was nominated for a 1960 Hugo Award for Best Dramatic Presentation and was given a repeat on September 5, 1960, the Labor Day weekend in which that Hugo Award was presented (to The Twilight Zone) at the World Science Fiction Convention in Pittsburgh. Bester returned to Sunday Showcase March 5, 1960 with an original teleplay, Turn the Key Deftly. Set in a traveling circus, this mystery starred Julie Harris, Maximilian Schell and Francis Lederer.

== Awards presentation ==
On November 29, 1959, Sunday Showcase presented The 2nd Annual Grammy Awards with a line-up of presenters and recipients including Meredith Willson, Duke Ellington, Frank Sinatra, Ella Fitzgerald, and Van Cliburn.

In June 1960, Sidney Lumet directed Reginald Rose's two-part The Sacco-Vanzetti Story, which was nominated for four Emmy Awards.

An episode of Sunday Showcase is available on a DVD from Shokus Video.
