= The Four-Hour Fugue =

"The Four-Hour Fugue" is a science fiction short story by American writer Alfred Bester, originally published in Analog Science Fiction and Fact magazine in 1974. The story deals with the mysterious behavior of a valuable scientist, as well as his relationship with the private investigator assigned to investigate him.

== Plot summary ==
Blaise Skiaki is a brilliant perfume developer, an industry which has become vitally important since water scarcity has made regular bathing impossible for most people. Skiaki's employers have become concerned about his erratic behaviour, in particular his habit of disappearing for several hours some nights, which they initially suspect to be evidence of corporate espionage of some kind. They hire Gretchen Nunn, a famed private investigator, who becomes Skiaki's lover and discovers that he vanishes for exactly four hours every time, that he appears to be in a fugue state during these periods, and that every state terminates with a murder. She is, however, unable to trail him in order to determine whether he is responsible for the murders himself.

During this time, Skiaki gives Nunn a jewel, which she wears in her belly button. She encounters him during his fugue state and hears him refer to himself as Mr. Wish. She eventually discovers that his talent for perfumery has led to him being able to detect human pheromone trails, and that he is following the trails of individuals who have a death wish.

Before Nunn is able to act on this information, Skiaki reveals to her that she is in fact blind, something she is unaware of due to a telepathic ability to view the world through the eyes of others. Horrified by this revelation, Nunn flees, only to be confronted by Skiaki in his murderous Mr. Wish persona. Several other men appear, and reveal in conversation with Mr. Wish that they are the ones responsible for the murders, having followed him each time he goes into a fugue state, though their motivation is not made clear. They strip Nunn of her clothes, and the sight of the gem in her belly button prompts Skiaki to escape from his fugue state and aid her in overcoming her attackers.

Skiaki is able to return to work, apparently in control of his fugue states now. He and Nunn discuss their shared revelations regarding their own natures, as well as their future, eventually deciding to continue their romantic relationship.

== Reception ==
"The Four-Hour Fugue" was a finalist for the 1975 Hugo Award for Best Short Story.

Walter E. Meyers, in his 1980 critical study Aliens and Linguists: Language Study and Science Fiction, called it "an excellent example of the mixing of science with fiction that, when done well, defines the genre for many of its readers."

== Publication history ==
"The Four-Hour Fugue" was originally published in the June 1974 issue of Analog Science Fiction and Fact, and it has since been republished in many science fiction anthologies, including The 1975 Annual World's Best SF, The Year's Best Science Fiction No. 8, The Best of Analog, and The SFWA Grand Masters Volume 2.

The story later became the opening section of Bester's novel Golem^{100} (1980).
