= Time is the Traitor =

Short story bt Alfterd Bester

"Time Is the Traitor" is a science fiction short story by American writer Alfred Bester, originally published in The Magazine of Fantasy and Science Fiction in September, 1953. It is included in the Bester collections The Dark Side of the Earth (1964), Star Light, Star Bright (1976) and Virtual Unrealities (1997) and has been extensively anthologized.

== Synopsis ==
John Strapp is a business consultant whose savant-like intuitive genius makes him so valuable that his support staff indulges all his eccentricities — including homicidal fugue states.

== Critical response ==
The story was selected for Isaac Asimov Presents The Great SF Stories 15 (1953) (DAW books, 1986) and for The Best Science Fiction Stories: 1954 (Fredrick Fell, 1954), as well as for The NESFA Core Reading List of Fantasy and Science Fiction.

In Locus, Rich Horton described "Time Is the Traitor" as "glorious" and "madly odd". Fiona Kelleghan considered that John Strapp's name "suggests both punishment and restraint", observing that Strapp was "tormented by flashbacks" and "compelled to repeat the same actions over and over", while Arthur D. Hlavaty of The New York Review of Science Fiction called Strapp an example of the "union of the artist and the criminal that is often considered Bester's defining theme." Kirkus Reviews judged it to be "more style than substance."

== Adaptations ==
Bester adapted the story for CBS Radio Mystery Theater, with the title "One Girl in a Million." In 1998, Warner Brothers purchased film adaptation rights to the story for $500,000.
