= The Demolished Man =

1953 science fiction novel by Alfred Bester

- Cover of first edition (hardcover)
- Author: Alfred Bester
- Cover artist: Mark Reinsberg
- Language: English
- Genre: Science fiction
- Publisher: Shasta Publishers (first edition)
- Publication date: 1953
- Publication place: United States
- Media type: Print (Hardback)
- Pages: 250
- Award: Hugo Award for Best Novel (1953)
- OCLC: 3638143

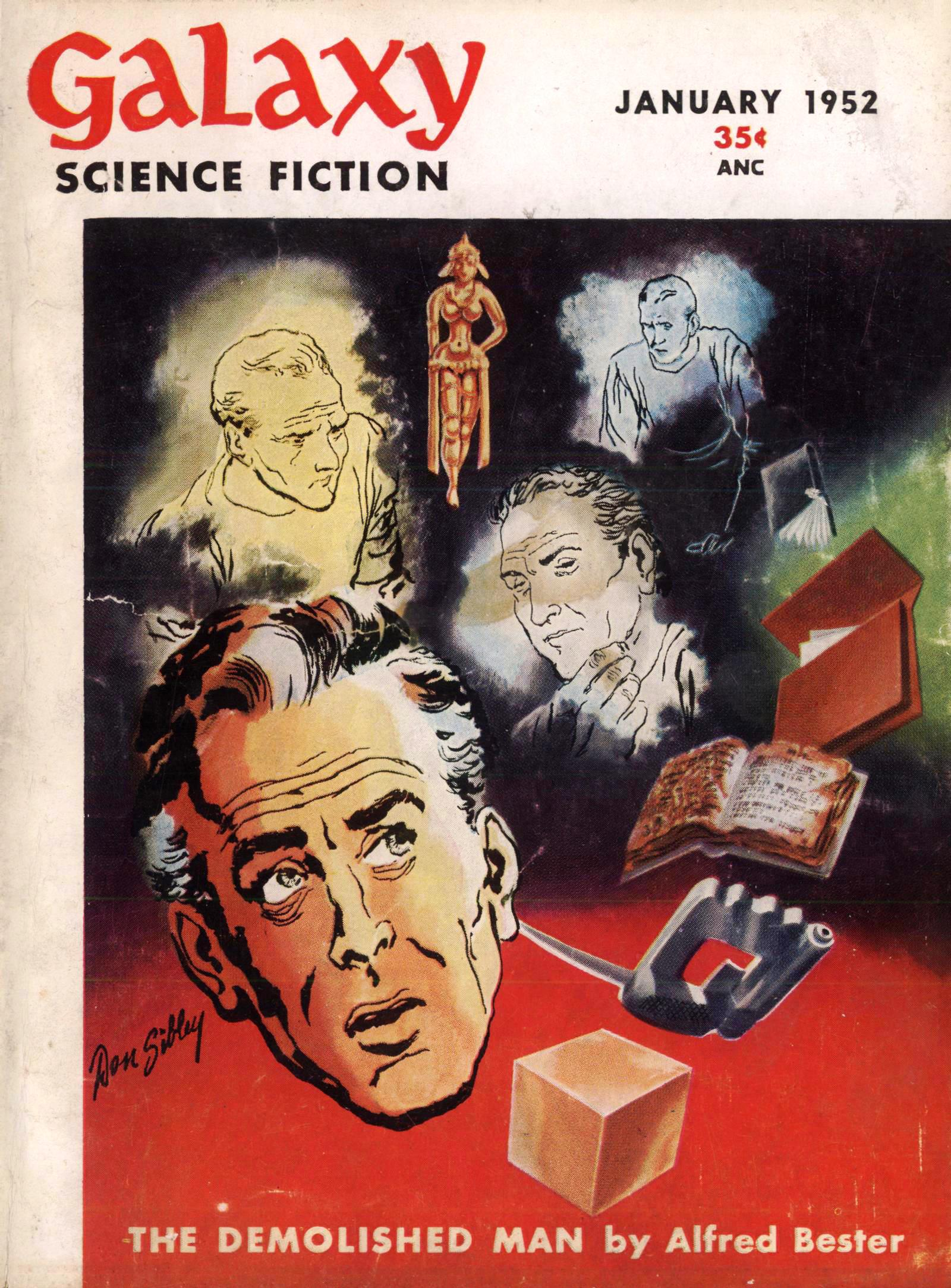
Cover of Galaxy Science Fiction by Don Sibley that carried the first segment of the serialized novel in January 1952.

The Demolished Man is a science fiction novel by American writer Alfred Bester, which won the first Hugo Award in 1953. An inverted detective story, the novel was first serialized in three parts, beginning with the January 1952 issue of Galaxy Science Fiction magazine, followed by publication of the novel in 1953. The novel is dedicated to Galaxy's editor, H. L. Gold, who offered suggestions during its writing. Bester's original title was Demolition!, but Gold persuaded him to change it.

== Plot introduction ==
The Demolished Man is a science fiction police procedural set in a future where telepathy is common, although much of its effectiveness is derived from one individual having greater telepathic skill than another.

In the 24th century, telepaths—called Espers or "peepers"—are integrated into all levels of society. They are classed according to their abilities: an Esper 3 can read the surface thoughts of a mind; an Esper 2 can read also from the subconscious mind; an Esper 1 can read from even the deepest levels of the mind, such as the id.

All Espers can telepathically communicate amongst themselves, and the more powerful Espers can overwhelm their juniors. Telepathic ability is innate and heritable but can remain latent and undetected in untrained persons. Once recognized, natural aptitude can be developed through instruction and exercise. There is a guild to improve Espers' telepathic skills, to set and enforce ethical conduct guidelines, and to increase the Esper population through intermarriage.

Some latent telepaths are undiscovered, or are aware of their abilities but refuse to submit to Guild rule. Some are ostracized as punishment for breaking the rules. One character in the story has suffered this fate for ten years, leaving him desperate for even vicarious contact with other telepaths.

== Plot summary ==
Ben Reich is the paranoid, impetuous owner of Monarch Utilities & Resources, a commercial cartel that the Reich family has possessed for generations. Monarch is in danger of bankruptcy because of its chief rival, the D'Courtney Cartel, headed by the older Craye D'Courtney. Reich suffers recurring nightmares in which a "Man with No Face" persecutes him.

Desperate to end his suffering, Reich contacts D'Courtney and proposes a merger of their concerns, but Reich's damaged psychological state causes him to misread D'Courtney's positive response as a refusal. Frustrated and desperate, Reich determines to kill D'Courtney. The presence of "peepers" has prevented the commission of murder for more than seventy years, so Reich devises an elaborate plan to ensure his freedom. If caught, Reich will certainly face "Demolition", a terrible punishment described only at the end of the story.

Reich hires an Esper to "run interference" for him—hiding his murderous thoughts from any peepers present at the scene of the planned crime. Reich bribes Dr. Augustus ("Gus") Tate, a prominent peeper psychiatrist, and uses him to mentally steal information about D'Courtney's planned attendance at a party. To further conceal his intentions from telepaths, Reich visits a songwriter, Duffy Wygand, to teach him a jingle that makes his real thoughts hard to read.

From Monarch's research facility, Reich secures a small flash grenade which can disrupt a victim's perception of time by temporarily destroying the eyes' rhodopsin. He acquires an antique (20th-century) handgun from a pawn shop, making sure to have the bullets removed from the cartridges when he buys it. He knows how to replace the bullet in the handgun's ammunition with a gelatin capsule filled with water in order to eliminate ballistics evidence.

At the party, he influences the host to play a game of Sardines in total darkness. Reich executes his plan during the game, but there is an unforeseen hitch: at the moment he shoots D'Courtney, D'Courtney's daughter Barbara witnesses the murder, struggles with Reich, grabs the gun, and runs away. She is later found suffering severe psychological shock that renders her catatonic and mute. Nobody but the party's hostess Maria knew that Barbara was with her father. Reich recovers his composure, returns to the party, and pretends to be lost. Just as he is about to leave, completing his getaway, a drop of blood from D'Courtney's body in the room above lands on him, and the party ends in chaos as the police are called.

A telepathic police detective, Lincoln Powell, is assigned to the case. As telepathically gathered evidence is legally inadmissible in court, but can be used to guide an investigation, the detective is obliged to assemble the murder case with traditional police procedures and to establish motive, means, and opportunity. The detective manages to read Reich's thoughts, sees that he is the murderer, and asks him to surrender. Reich refuses, relishing the thrill of the hunt to come.

Both sides center on finding and questioning (or, in Reich's case, silencing) Barbara D'Courtney. Although Reich finds her first, he is unable to kill her before Powell rescues her. The pursuit traverses the Solar System as Reich escapes the police and a series of mysterious assassination attempts. Others are attacked also: during Powell's attempt to interrogate the pawnbroker from whom Reich bought the gun, an unknown person attacks the pawnshop with a "harmonic gun" that destroys by resonant sonic vibration. Reich tries but fails to murder Hassop, his own chief of communications (to try to prevent him from assisting the police with his knowledge of the corporate codes), and Powell succeeds in abducting Hassop.

Powell has already established opportunity, and eventually method, through discovery of a tiny fragment of gelatin in the body. Just as Powell believes that he has wrapped the case up entirely, the interrogation of Hassop yields disturbing results: D'Courtney had accepted the merger proposal. That dashes Powell's case; as he remarks, no court in the Solar System would believe Reich murdered D'Courtney when D'Courtney was needed alive for the merger (which would save Reich and give him all the power and wealth he dreamed of) to succeed.

Reich's tortured mental state is unknown to Reich himself, so Powell does not suspect that the motive for the murder was something other than financial. After more attempts on his life, and more dreams of the "Man with No Face", Reich attempts to kill Powell. Powell easily disarms him and then reads his mind. Suddenly Powell recognizes that the forces behind Reich's crime are greater than anticipated. He asks the help of every Esper in attempting to arrest Reich, channeling their collective mental energy through Powell in the dangerous telepathic procedure called the "Mass Cathexis Measure". He justifies this by claiming that Reich is an embryonic megalomaniac who will remake society in his own twisted image if not stopped.

Powell uses the power to construct a solipsistic fantasy for Reich to experience. One by one, he removes elements of reality, beginning with the stars in the sky, until Reich is left believing that he is the only real being in a world constructed around him, as a game. Finally Reich is left facing the "Man with No Face", who is both himself and Craye D'Courtney.

Reich is revealed to be the natural son of Craye D'Courtney, from an affair with Reich's mother—Reich's hatred of him was probably due to a latent, telepathic knowledge of that fact. Reich's knowledge is not explicitly stated, but Barbara D'Courtney, whom Powell discovers to be Reich's half-sister, is herself revealed to be a peeper. The assassination attempts on Reich were carried out by Reich himself as a result of his disturbed state. Once arrested and convicted, Reich is sentenced to the dreaded Demolition—the stripping away of his memories and the upper layers of his personality, emptying his mind for re-education. This 24th-century society uses psychological demolition because it recognizes the social value of strong personalities able to defy the law, seeking the salvaging of positive traits while ridding the person of the evil consciousness of the criminal.

== Reception ==
Reviewer Groff Conklin characterized The Demolished Man as "a magnificent novel... as fascinating a study of character as I have ever read". Boucher and McComas praised the novel as "a taut, surrealistic melodrama [and] a masterful compounding of science and detective fiction", singling out Bester's depiction of a "ruthless and money-mad [society] that is dominated and being subtly reshaped by telepaths" as particularly accomplished. Imagination reviewer Mark Reinsberg received the novel favorably, citing its "brilliant depictions of future civilization and 24th century social life".

After criticizing unrealistic science fiction, Carl Sagan in 1978 listed The Demolished Man as among stories "that are so tautly constructed, so rich in the accommodating details of an unfamiliar society that they sweep me along before I have even a chance to be critical". For a 1996 reprint, author Harry Harrison wrote an introduction in which he called it "a first novel that was, and still is, one of the classics". Richard Beard described the book as "full of vigorous action", saying, "the ripping pace of the book becomes part of what it's about".

In an SF Site Featured Review, Todd Richmond wrote that the book is "a complicated game of manoeuvering, evasion, and deception, as Reich and Polwell [sic] square off against one another", adding:

The game is a very interesting one, because while Reich is a very rich man and has considerable resources, Polwell [sic] has an entire network of peepers to help him gather information and obtain evidence... The best part of Bester's story is its timelessness... There are few references to outlandish or dated technology (with the exception of a punch card computer!) or outrageous social practices or fashions. While Bester's future isn't utopia, neither is it a post-apocalyptic nightmare... Bester extrapolates his view of the 50s forward in time, recognizing that while things like technology will change, basic human nature will not. The Demolished Man is a welcome change for those tired of modern trilogies and series.

In his "Books" column for F&SF, Damon Knight selected Bester's novel as one of the 10 best sf books of the 1950s.

The Demolished Man won the 1953 Hugo Award for Best Novel and placed second for the year's International Fantasy Award for fiction. The Orion Publishing Group chose the novel as its fourteenth selection for its series SF Masterworks in 1999.

== Characters ==
=== Major characters ===
- Ben Reich lacks moral integrity and is willing to take considerable risks in order to see his wishes carried out. However, he is a very charming man to many around him, especially at the story's beginning when his desperation is still in check. His personal mantra is: "Make your enemies by choice, not by accident." He is about forty, and in his own words "wouldn't trade places with God, or looks with the Devil." His ancestors have left him, in book form, advice about how to pursue his ambitions. One chapter, "Murder", lays out some ideas, including using the Sardine game. At the same time, he is tormented by dreams of "The Man with No Face", which he initially believes is the face of Murder itself.
- Lincoln Powell is a Class 1 Esper in his thirties. He is Prefect of Police, which in this case means chief detective. He is handsome, intelligent, charming, and well-liked. As the story opens, he is being considered for the Presidency of the Esper Guild, but since he is not married to another Esper, as Guild policy requires, he is disqualified. He lives alone in a house, since highly skilled Espers cannot live in crowded apartment blocks where they are bombarded by the thoughts of others. He is said to have a dual personality; behind the correct role of model Esper and perfect cop hides Dishonest Abe, a compulsive liar. Often, Dishonest Abe takes the lead in conversation, with Powell finding himself lying in earnest to anybody, just for the sake of amusing himself. He invents absurd tales of heroic cops who do not exist, or accounts of how the stress of his job causes him to become left-handed temporarily. His most notorious lie gave rise to the question "Who stole the weather, Powell?" which other peepers use to embarrass him, even though few actually know the details of the incident.
- Barbara D'Courtney is a very pretty, young blonde woman, daughter of Craye D'Courtney, whom Reich pursues to kill and with whom Powell falls in love despite the fact that, according to the Guild rules, he must marry an Esper. However, she is revealed to be a latent Esper herself. Having witnessed her father's murder, she becomes catatonic. She is given a treatment that regresses her to childhood mentally, expecting that she will come to terms with the tragedy as she returns to her adult self over a period of weeks. During this time, Powell attempts to extract information from her subconscious mind, but is blocked by strange images including one of her and Reich as conjoined twins. This is a clue on the trail to discovering Reich's real motive for murder.
- Mary Noyes is an Esper 2 who is a close friend of Lincoln Powell. She is in fact in love with Powell, but he does not return the affection. Since Guild members are required to marry other Espers as part of the Guild's "Eugenic Plan", she hopes he will eventually marry her anyway. When it becomes obvious to her that Powell, in the process of peeping Barbara D'Courtney, has fallen in love with her instead, she becomes angry and distant.
- Dr. Augustus "Gus" Tate is a psychiatrist and Esper 1, who becomes Reich's ally in murdering Craye D'Courtney. Although he makes millions in fees from his practice, Tate has to pay 95% in taxes to the Esper Guild to further its education, outreach, and eugenics programs. He is a member of the ultra-right-wing "League of Esper Patriots". Reich offers him riches beyond his dreams, a promise that Tate verifies by peeping Reich. In return, Tate warns Reich of Espers that threaten him, peeps the details for D'Courtney's visit to New York from D'Courtney's own physician, Sam @kins, and then after the murder participates in the cover-up, peeping the investigators. Tate also finds from his peeping that Reich's motives are not what he believes, and that the dreams of the "Man with No Face" will not stop when D'Courtney is dead. He refuses to tell Reich the truth about the dreams, believing that this gives him a hold over his partner in crime. He dies when Keno Quizzard's men attack Jerry Church's pawn shop in an attempt to kill Lincoln Powell.

=== Minor characters ===
- Keno Quizzard is the blind albino (a characterization also in The Stars My Destination) leader of an underworld organization employing "gimpsters" (gangsters), hired by Reich to help find Barbara D'Courtney. Eventually Quizzard is lured into space where he has an "accident" while traveling with Reich.
- Chooka Frood is a corrupt brothel keeper. She keeps a bodyguard (a possible friend-companion-lover) named Magda who has red eyes, laughs continually, dresses in leather and studs, and is apt to attack at the slightest provocation. Chooka is also a latent telepath, a fact that she uses in her fortune-telling act in the bizarre basement of the brothel. The building is part of Bastion West Side, the site of the last great battle of a war. The fires and explosions caused melted glass and pigments from a ceramics factory to flow into the basement, resulting in a multicolored, luminescent floor. The rest of the building consists of boudoirs, voyeur chambers, and "The Coop", a network of rooms that can be used to hide fugitives. It is in one of these rooms that Barbara D'Courtney is found, apparently having been scooped off the street by Chooka's pimps after wandering away from the Beaumont house in a catatonic state. Chooka had been using her in the fortune-telling act, though this is not described.
- Duffy Wyg& (read "Wygand") is the composer of the "'Tenser', said the Tensor" jingle. "To Reich she was the epitome of the modern career girl—the virgin seductress", who seems to crave either humiliation or conquest by men.
- Sam @kins (read "Atkins"), Esper 1 MD, is a top psychiatrist like Gus Tate. Unlike Tate he does not resent his Guild taxes, and he throws himself into charity work. His home on Venus is full of charity cases and hangers-on. He is a member of the Environmental Clique, who believe that Esper ability exists in all people and can be brought out by training. He was also treating Craye D'Courtney, whose personality was disintegrating under, in his belief, unfounded guilt over child abandonment (the child being Reich). Powell consults Atkins to determine if D'Courtney committed suicide, and in the process learns that Tate had asked him about D'Courtney, apparently on Reich's behalf.
- Jerry Church, Esper ~~2~~ (the "2" is struck through with a "/" in the original text), is an ostracized Esper who once helped Reich profit by reading the minds of business rivals. He runs a pawn shop, from which Reich obtains the gun he uses to kill D'Courtney. Reich made millions via Church, but Church has lost everything. No Esper will even talk to him, let alone communicate with him telepathically. At one point in the book he stands outside Powell's house, eavesdropping on the Esper party inside, so great is his need for that kind of contact. Powell notices him and offers him a drink, but Jerry resents his pity, throws the drink back at him, and runs off. After the murder, Jerry passes on information about Barbara D'Courtney's whereabouts to Keno Quizzard, leading Reich to find her at Chooka Frood's just as Powell, alerted by his own investigation, arrives. Later, Keno's men attack his shop with him, Powell, and Tate inside. Tate, foreseeing that his criminal involvement will be his undoing, commits suicide by allowing himself to be destroyed by the effects of the harmonic gun. Powell persuades Jerry to turn against Reich, blaming him for the attack. Jerry's testimony about the gun purchase is a vital piece of evidence.
- Maria Beaumont is a Manhattan socialite known as the "Gilt Corpse". Her body has been surgically enhanced to render it, in the novel's terminology, "pneumatic", a term used in similar context in Brave New World. She flaunts her body at every opportunity. Craye D'Courtney stays at her house when in New York, and it is this that gives Reich his opportunity. He sends Maria an ancient book of party games in which he has made sure that only the game of "Sardines" is legible, knowing that she will insist on playing it at the party, making the entire house pitch-dark in the process. Maria adds her own flourish by insisting that everyone be naked while playing.

=== Other characters ===
The novel has several other characters who only marginally participate in the plot:

- "Wynken, Blynken, and Nod" are three telepaths with eidetic memory who act as Lincoln Powell's personal secretaries, walking encyclopedias, and recorders of his conversations with officials such as Police Commissioner Crabbe. For instance, when Powell is seeking clearance from Crabbe to pursue Reich, they remind him of a previous conversation where Crabbe admitted that Reich had supported him when he ran for Solar Senator. They also are privy to his personal secrets, mostly embarrassing episodes of his "Dishonest Abe" persona.
- Snim Asj is a stereotypical punk and street hustler who is one of Chooka Frood's tenants. Threatened with eviction for non-payment of rent, he protests that Chooka is making a fortune from the "yellow-head girl" (Barbara D'Courtney). While attempting to raise cash, he spreads the story around on the street, resulting in both Reich and Powell hearing of where Barbara can be found.
- T'Sung is the current President of the Esper Guild. Powell enters his office while he is dictating an angry letter to the League of Esper Patriots. T'Sung is pugnacious and blustering, yelling at his secretaries while exchanging telepathic jibes with Powell. The secretaries are accustomed to this, knowing that it is his way of dealing with the stress of the job. T'Sung wants Powell to marry a peeper as soon as possible so that Powell can take on the job himself.
- De Santis is the head of the crime lab who investigates the murder scene, and later is in charge of constructing the model simulation of the crime for presentation to the District Attorney. He is irritable at the best of times. Powell is "peppery" with him because De Santis is "comfortable in no other relationship." The lack of evidence at the crime scene drives him to distraction. The only recoverable evidence is a piece of gelatin, which he interprets to mean that D'Courtney was eating candy, an impossibility given that he had throat cancer.
- Crabbe is the Police Commissioner, and is reluctant to support Powell's pursuit of Reich. When Powell and his staff are preparing their presentation for the District Attorney, Crabbe bursts in to insist that they end the persecution of his "good friend, Ben Reich." Powell "accidentally" sets off one of Reich's tiny rhodopsin-ionizing capsules under Crabbe's nose, rendering him unconscious. Later, after Powell's case collapses, Reich goes to see the Commissioner. Crabbe offers profuse apologies, trying to divert Reich into supporting his political ambitions while assuring him that Powell will suffer. Only at the end, as Powell explains the real reasons behind Reich's crime, and how he exposed it, does Crabbe appear sympathetic. Even then, after the interview Powell admits to having manipulated Crabbe to ensure his future support.
- Monarch's Chief of Personnel Recruitment (never actually named) is an Esper 2 with a passion for workplace efficiency. In his own words, telepathy is just another skill subject to work-time requirements. As Reich arrives at Monarch, ready to offer merger to D'Courtney, the Chief is lambasting his staff for sending him unsuitable candidates for final review. He aims to vet at least 6 of them per hour for his 8-hour day, with no more than 35% rejections. He then insists on Reich hiring Blonn, a Class 1 Esper, to vet Esper candidates. He justifies this by quoting the time that it would take him to thoroughly vet Esper 3 and Esper 2 candidates, finishing by saying that he could not vet an Esper 1 at all. In doing so, he sets out some of the basic story information: that in the Guild there are about 100,000 Class 3 Espers, 10,000 Class 2 Espers and 1,000 Class 1 Espers. At the same time, Reich's own Esper secretary is making jibes telepathically, which is typical of the irreverent culture of Espers as it is depicted in the novel.
- "Old Man Mose" is the "Mosaic Multiplex Prosecution Computor" of the District Attorney's office. It appears briefly after Powell believes he has completed the case against Reich. The machine is, in the words of one character, "kittenish", humorously printing out apparently nonsensical legal language when first switched on. Its hardware and actions are described as if it were a person. All major cases have to be reviewed by Mose. Initially the machine rejects the case for "insufficient documentation of passion motive." This is another indication that Reich's motivations were not what even he thought. Mose is persuaded to focus on the profit motive, and produces a favorable prediction for prosecution. At that point, the actual reply D'Courtney sent to Reich's merger offer appears, showing that there was no profit motive. The case against Reich collapses.

== Typography ==
Bester played with typographic symbols when constructing various characters' names. This gave "Wyg&" for "Wygand", "@kins" for "Atkins", and "¼Maine" for "Quartermaine". He also used overtyping to strike out the "2" in Jerry Church's label of "Esper ~~2~~", to show that he has been expelled from the Esper community.

== Major themes ==
Jo Walton has said that The Demolished Man is shaped by Freudian psychology, comparing it to The Last Battle's relation to Christianity, and emphasizing that the resolution of the plot only makes sense in a Freudian context: Reich's hatred of D'Courtney is motivated by oedipal feelings. Writer Richard Beard thought the Freudian aspects dubious: "Not all his future projections have worn so well. Reich's motives are stiffly dependent on Freudian theory, but most glaringly Bester fails to predict any type of feminism. The words girl and pretty always come as a pair."

== Adaptations ==
In 1959, novelist Thomas Pynchon applied for a Ford Foundation Fellowship to work with an opera company, proposing to write, among other possibilities, an adaptation of The Demolished Man. The application was turned down.

Since reading the novel as a young man, director Brian De Palma has considered adapting it for film. Lack of financing has long since kept the film unproduced.

The Demolished Man was adapted for German radio by RIAS Berlin in 1973 under the title Demolition. It was the first radio drama recorded with the dummy head recording method.

The Demolished Man was adapted for Norwegian NRK Radio in 1981 under the title Demolisjon.

== In popular culture ==
Donald Fagen of the band Steely Dan said of their hit song "Deacon Blues":

The concept of the "expanding man" that opens the song may have been inspired by Alfred Bester's The Demolished Man. Walter and I were major sci-fi fans. The guy in the song imagines himself ascending to the levels of evolution, "expanding" his mind, his spiritual possibilities, and his options in life.
