= List of Starman story arcs =

The DC Comics comic book series Starman (vol. 2) featured several story arcs over the course of 82 issues and two Annuals, plus a few spin-off stories as well.

== Credits ==
All issues are written by James Robinson.

Issues #1–47 are pencilled by Tony Harris and inked by Wade Von Grawbadger unless otherwise noted.

Issues #50–80 are pencilled by Peter Snejbjerg unless otherwise noted.

Issues #48–60 are inked by Keith Champagne and issues #61–80 are inked by Peter Snejbjerg unless otherwise noted.

All issues are colored by Gregory Wright unless otherwise noted.

Issues #1–9 are lettered by John Workman.

Issues #12–80 are lettered by Bill Oakley unless otherwise noted.

Issues #1–16 and 20–44 are edited by Archie Goodwin and Chuck Kim.

Issues #17–19 are edited by Archie Goodwin only.

Issues #45–47 edited by Chuck Kim and Peter Tomasi.

Issues #48–56, 75–76, and 78–80 are edited by Peter Tomasi only.

Issues #57–74 are edited by Peter Tomasi and L. A. Williams.

Issues #77 and 80 are edited by Peter Tomasi and Stephen Wacker.

== Main series ==
=== "Sins of the Father" (#0–3) ===
Mist assaults Opal City, prompting Jack Knight to reluctantly take up the mantle of Starman to stop him.

=== "A Day in the Opal" (#4) ===
Jack receives two visitors at his antiques shop.

=== "Talking with David '95" (#5) ===
The first of a series of annual encounters between Jack and his dead brother, David Knight.

=== "1882: Back Stage, Back Then" (#6) ===
The first of the "Times Past" stories; this one recounts how Shade moved to Opal City. This issue was pencilled by Kim Hagen, Bjarne Hansen, Christian Hojgaard, and Teddy H. Kristiansen; inked by Kristiansen; colored by Gregory Wright; and lettered by Ken Bruzenak, Bob Pinaha, and John Workman, Jr.

=== "A (K)night at the Circus" (#7–8) ===
Jack discovers Mikaal Tomas, enslaved at a circus freak show.

=== "Shards" (#9) ===
A transitional issue, covering many small events that set the stage for things to come.

=== "The Day Before the Day to Come" (#10) ===
As the new Mist prepares for her attack on the Opal, Jack befriends Solomon Grundy.

=== "13 Years Ago: Five Friends" (#11) ===
The second "Times Past" story recounts the final encounter between Ted Knight and Rag Doll. This issue was drawn by Matthew Dow Smith; colored by Gregory Wright; and lettered by Gaspar Saladino.

=== "Sins of the Child" (#12–16) ===
The new Mist assaults Opal City and various heroes emerge from the chaos.

Issue #14 was pencilled by Amanda Conner, Tommy Lee Edwards, Gary Erskine, Tony Harris, Stuart Immonen, Andrew Robinson, and Chris Sprouse; and inked by Gary Erskine and Wade Von Grawbadger.

Issues #15–16 were colored by Ted McKeever.

=== "Encounters" (#17) ===
Jack ends one relationship and begins another; Shade and the O'Dares fight a demon, and Matt O'Dare gets trapped in a magical painting.

=== "First Joust" (#18) ===
The third "Times Past" story recounts the first encounter between Ted Knight and the original Mist.

=== "Talking with David '96" (#19) ===
The second "Talking with David" story takes place on board a pirate ship.

=== "Sand and Stars" (#20–23) ===
Jack has an adventure with Wesley Dodds, the Golden Age Sandman.

Issue #22 was pencilled by Guy Davis and Tony Harris; inked by Davis and Wade Von Grawbadger; and colored by David J. Hornung and Trish Mulvihill.

Issue #23 was colored by Kevin Somers.

Issue #24 was pencilled by Tony Harris and Chris Sprouse; and inked by Ray Snyder and Wade Von Grawbadger.

=== "Hell and Back" (#24–26) ===
Jack and Shade enter the magic painting to rescue Matt O'Dare and bring back more than they bargained for.

Issue #26 was pencilled by Gary Erskine, Tony Harris, and J.H. Williams III; and inked by Erskine, Mick Gray, and Wade Von Grawbadger.

=== "Christmas Knight" (#27) ===
It is Christmas at the O'Dare household. This issue was colored by Patrick Garrahy.

=== "1976: Super Freaks and Backstabbers" (#28) ===
The fourth "Times Past" story explains the backstory of Mikaal Tomas. This issue was pencilled by Craig T. Hamilton and inked by Ray Snyder.

=== "The Return of Bobo" (#29) ===
A bank robber is released from prison and finds a new life in Opal. This issue also includes an entry of "The Shade's Journal" that summarizes the current state of affairs in Opal City.

=== "Infernal Devices" (#30–33) ===
Jack and a pirate ghost confront the mad bomber, Mr. Pip. Jack, Alan Scott, and Batman enter Grundy's mind to save his life.

Issue #30 was colored by Trish Mulvihill.

Issue #31 was inked by Ray Snyder and Wade Von Grawbadger.

Issue #33 was pencilled by Tony Harris and Mark Buckingham; inked by Wade Von Grawbadger; and colored by Michael Wright.

=== "Merry Pranksters" (#34) ===
The fate of Solomon Grundy. This issue was pencilled by Mark Buckingham and Steve Yeowell; inked by Wayne Faucher, Wade Von Grawbadger, and Steve Yeowell; and colored by Michael Wright.

=== "Mr. Pip and Mr. Black" (#35) ===
The final confrontation with Mr. Pip. This issue was pencilled by Tony Harris and Steve Yeowell.

This issue ties into the crossover event Genesis.

=== "1990: A Hero Once...Despite Himself" (#36) ===
The fifth "Times Past" story explains who Will Payton is. This issue was pencilled by Richard Pace; inked by Wade Von Grawbadger; and colored by John Kalisz.

=== "Talking with David '97" (#37) ===
The third "Talking with David" story is a dinner party with a cast of dead heroes from the Golden Age.

=== "...La Fraternite De Justice Et Libere!" (#38) ===
The new Mist vs. the Justice League Europe. This issue was pencilled by Dusty Abell; inked by Norman Lee and Dexter Vines; and colored by Noelle C. Giddings.

=== "Lightning and Stars" (#39, The Power of Shazam! (vol. 2) #35, #40 and The Power of Shazam! (vol. 2) #36) ===
Bulletman is accused of being a Nazi spy, leading to a team-up between Jack Knight and Captain Marvel.

Issue #40 was inked by Ray Snyder and Wade Von Grawbadger.

The Power of Shazam! (vol. 2) #35–36 was written by Jerry Ordway; pencilled by Peter Krause; inked by Dick Giordano; colored by Glenn Whitmore; lettered by John Costanza; and edited by Mike Carlin.

=== "Villain's Redemption" (#41) ===
Shade and Matt O'Dare set out to remove all evidence of Matt's past wrongdoings so that he can make a fresh start. This issue was drawn by Gary Eyskine.

=== "1944: Science and Sorcery" (#42) ===
The sixth "Times Past" story describes an encounter between Ted Knight and Etrigan the Demon. This issue was pencilled by Matthew Dow Smith.

=== "Knight's Past" (#43) ===
Jack opens his new antiques store and begins his quest to find Will Payton. This issue was pencilled by Mike Mayhew and lettered by Kurt Hathaway.

=== "1943: Things That Go Bump in the Night" (#44) ===
The seventh "Times Past" story introduces Sandra Knight, the original Phantom Lady.

=== "Destiny" (#45) ===
Jack leaves for the stars.

=== "Good Men and Bad: 1952" (#46) ===
The eighth "Times Past" story recounts team-ups between Ted Knight and the Jester and between Bobo Benneti and Shade. This issue was drawn and colored by Gene Ha.

=== "City Without Light (A Prelude to Bad Times)" (#47) ===
This issue shows Opal City as it adapts to Jack's absence. This issue was pencilled by Steve Yeowell.

=== "Stars My Destination" (#48–60) ===
Jack and Mikaal travel to space in search of Will Payton, and discover a link between him and another alien Starman, Prince Gavyn of Throneworld. This story arc was co-written by James Robinson and David S. Goyer.

Issues #48–49 were pencilled by Steve Yeowell. Issue #49 was inked by Yeowell.

Issue #50 was inked by Champagne and Wade Von Grawbadger; and colored by John Kalisz.

Issue #54 was pencilled, colored, and lettered by Craig T. Hamilton; and inked by Ray Snyder.

Issue #55 was pencilled by John McCrea, Peter Snejbjerg, and Chris Weston.

Issue #56 was pencilled by Stephen Sadowski and Peter Snejbjerg.

Issue #57 was colored by Jason Wright.

Issue #59 was colored by Allen Jamison and Gregory Wright.

=== "Grand Guignol" (#61–73) ===
Many villains are brought together by a shadowy mastermind who is bent on destroying both Opal City and Shade.

Issue #69 was pencilled and inked by Paul Smith and Peter Snejbjerg.

=== "1899, The Scalphunter Years: His Death and the Dying of It" (#74) ===
The final "Times Past" story recounts the final days of Scalphunter. This issue was drawn by Russ Heath.

=== "Sons and their Fathers" (#75) ===
Jack meets Superman.

=== "Talking with David (and Ted)" (#76) ===
The final "Talking with David" story.

=== "1951" (#77–79) ===
Jack finds himself in 1951, where he meets the Starman of that year. This story arc was co-written by James Robinson and David S. Goyer.

=== "Arrivederci, Bon Voyage, Goodbye" (#80) ===
Jack says his goodbyes and leaves the Starman identity and Opal City behind.

== Specials and tie-ins ==
=== The Shade #1-4 (April–July 1997) ===
Published April–July 1997, this four-issue miniseries follows the history of Shade from 1838 to the present. Each issue was illustrated by different artists, with Pat Garrahy providing colors (issues #2-4) and Chris Eliopoulos providing letters for all four issues. Issue #1, "A Family Affair, Piers: 1838", was full illustrated by Gene Ha. Issue #2, "Rupert and Marguerite: 1865 & 1931", was illustrated by J. H. Williams III and Mick Gray. Issue #3, "The Spider: 1951", was illustrated by Bret Blevins, and issue #4, "Finale, Craig: 1997", was illustrated by Michael Zulli. The entire miniseries was collected in Starman Omnibus Volume 3.

=== Starman: The Mist #1 (June 1998) ===
Published in June 1998, this one-shot tie-in to DC's Girlfrenzy! event was pencilled by John Lucas; inked by Richard Case; colored by Pat Garrahy; and lettered by Bill Oakley.

=== Starman (vol. 2) #1,000,000 (November 1998) ===
Published between Starman (vol. 2) #47-48, this one-shot tie-in to DC One Million was pencilled by Peter Snejbjerg; inked by Wade Von Grawbadger; colored by Gregory Wright; lettered by Bill Oakley; and edited by Peter Tomasi.

=== Starman 80-Page Giant #1 (January 1999) ===
This entire issue was colored by Carla Feeny; lettered by Kurt Hathaway; and edited by Peter Tomasi.

=== Starman (vol. 2) #81 (March 2010) ===
In March 2010, DC published a single issue continuation of Starman (vol. 2) as part of a revival of ended series during the crossover event Blackest Night. Starman (vol. 2) #81 was written by James Robinson; pencilled by Fernando Dagnino and Bill Sienkiewicz; inked by Sienkiewicz; colored by Matt Hollingsworth; and lettered by John J. Hill.

This issue did not feature Jack Knight, but rather focused on a romantic relationship between Shade and Hope O'Dare and a resurrected David Knight becoming a Black Lantern.
