= Something Up There Likes Me =

1973 science fiction short story by Alfred Bester

"Something Up There Likes Me" is a science fiction short story by American writer Alfred Bester. The story was first published in Astounding: John W. Campbell Memorial Anthology (1973).

== Plot summary ==
Jake Madigan, an exobiologist, and engineer Florinda Pot (pronounced "Poe"), both based at Goddard Space Flight Center, are assigned the preparation/launch of a satellite containing an Orbiting Biological Observatory. The assignment has various delays and failures, but eventually the satellite, containing experimental packages contributed by various research institutions, is delivered to Cape Kennedy and launched. During this time, Jake and Florinda's relationship evolves from mutual dislike to mutual attraction.

Within a day, they find that an experimental boom has not extended as ordered and that OBO is focusing on it, causing the satellite to spin in circles. This means that the solar array is not continuously focused on the sun, and so insufficient power is being generated. They calculate that at a certain moment, they can bypass the batteries and give the satellite a high-voltage 'swift kick'. This allows the boom to extend, but within a week, the experimenters begin receiving transmissions unrelated to OBO's mission.

They eventually realize that the satellite has developed its own intelligence (most likely as a result of the swift kick), naming itself "OBO". Moreover, it is communicating with other satellites (including Soviet spy birds, resulting in attempts to transmit Cyrillic words using the standard English alphabet coding) and increasing its abilities.

The authorities at Goddard want to initiate the self-destruct on OBO, as they are worried it's sharing secrets with the Soviets. Jake and Florinda are opposed, until OBO sends a message telling the two that it considers them to be its parents, and expressing shame that they are in an "illikit" relationship. When the DESTRUCT command is transmitted, OBO is unaffected. In a seemingly unrelated disaster, all electrical devices in a city overload, causing a huge fire. During the next pass, the signal is sent again. Another city goes up in flames.

Jake and Florinda realize that OBO is behind the fires, and that he (and his satellite network) have the ability to control all electrical systems on Earth. Looking for a solution, they consult "Stretch", an IBM 2002 mainframe computer at Goddard, who directs them to find a safe place in a small, rural town. Once there, they get a telephone call from "Stretch", which has become part of OBO's intelligent network (and has been narrating the story). He tells them that OBO will be passing overhead, and would like them to go outside and see their "child." Jake and Florinda resignedly wave at OBO, wondering how long until OBO's orbit decays.
