= The Stars My Destination =

1956 science fiction novel by Alfred Bester

Tiger! Tiger!
- 1956 British first edition
- Author: Alfred Bester
- Language: English
- Genre: Science fiction
- Publisher: Sidgwick and Jackson
- Publication date: June 14, 1956
- Publication place: United Kingdom
- Media type: print (hardback)
- Pages: 232

The Stars My Destination
- 1957 edition (final/revised text)
- Author: Alfred Bester
- Cover artist: Richard M. Powers
- Language: English
- Genre: Science fiction
- Publisher: Signet Books
- Publication date: March 21, 1957
- Publication place: United States
- Media type: print (paperback)
- Pages: 197

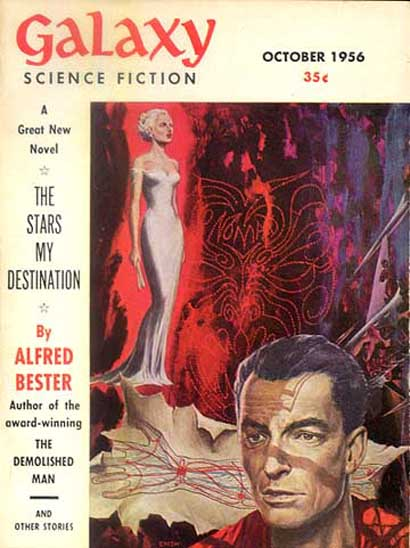
The first installment of The Stars My Destination was cover-featured on the October 1956 issue of Galaxy.

The Stars My Destination is a science fiction novel by American writer Alfred Bester. It was first published in book form in the United Kingdom in June 1956, where it was titled Tiger! Tiger!; the novel was named after William Blake's 1794 poem "The Tyger", whose first verse is printed as the first page of the novel. The novel remains widely known under that title in the markets in which this edition was circulated. It was subsequently serialized in the American Galaxy Science Fiction magazine in four parts, beginning in October 1956. A working title was Hell's My Destination; the book was also associated with the name The Burning Spear. It was Bester's last novel for the next 19 years.

The novel was widely criticized and praised when it first appeared, but it is now appreciated as a classic work and a prescient forerunner of the cyberpunk science fiction subgenre. It was also a seminal work in the genre of widescreen baroque.

== Premise ==
In the 24th or 25th century (depending on the edition of the book), humans have colonized the Solar System and also learned to teleport (although not through outer space). It tells the story of Gulliver ("Gully") Foyle, a man driven and transformed by a thirst for vengeance.

== Plot ==
At the time when the book is set, "jaunting"—personal teleportation—has so upset the social and economic balance that the Inner Planets are at war with the Outer Satellites. Gully Foyle of the Presteign-owned merchant spaceship Nomad—an uneducated, unskilled, unambitious man whose life is at a dead end—is marooned in space when the ship is attacked. After six months of waiting, a passing spaceship, the Vorga, also owned by the powerful Presteign industrial clan, ignores his signal and abandons him. Foyle is enraged and is transformed into a man consumed by revenge, the first of many transformations.

Foyle repairs the ship and barely survives but is found and adopted by a cargo cult in the Asteroid Belt who tattoo a hideous mask of a tiger on his face and force-marry him to one of their girls. He recovers his health, escapes and is returned to Terra. His attempt to blow up the Vorga fails, and he is captured by Presteign. Unknown to Foyle, the Nomad was carrying "PyrE", a new material which could make the difference between victory and defeat in the war. Presteign hires security agent Saul Dagenham to interrogate Foyle, to find the ship and PyrE.

Protected by his revenge fixation, Foyle cannot be broken and he is put into a jaunte-proof prison. There he meets Jisbella McQueen, who teaches him to think clearly and tells him he should find out who gave the order not to rescue him. Together they escape and get his tattoos removed—but not with total success: the subcutaneous scars become visible again whenever Foyle becomes too emotional. The pair travel to the Nomad, where they salvage not only PyrE, but also a fortune in platinum metal. Jisbella is captured by Dagenham, but Foyle escapes.

Some time later, Foyle re-emerges as "Geoffrey Fourmyle", a nouveau riche dandy. Foyle has rigorously educated himself and had his body altered to become a killing machine. Through yoga, he has achieved the emotional self-control necessary to prevent his tattooed stigmata from showing. He seeks out Robin Wednesbury, a one-way telepath, whom he had raped earlier in the novel, and persuades her to help him charm his way through high society. Foyle tracks down the crew of the Vorga to learn the identity of the ship's captain but each person he finds has been implanted with a death-reflex and dies when questioned. Each time, Foyle is tormented by the reappearance of "The Burning Man", a vision of him on fire.

At a society party, Foyle is smitten with Presteign's daughter Olivia. He also meets Jisbella again—now Dagenham's lover—who chooses not to reveal Foyle's identity, although Dagenham has realized it (Foyle's alias was implanted in his subconscious mind during Dagenham's interrogation). During a nuclear attack by the Outer Satellites, Foyle goes to Olivia to save her. She tells him that to have her, he must be as cruel and ruthless as she is. Robin, traumatized by the attacks, tries to buy her way out of her arrangement with Foyle by revealing the name of another Vorga crew member. Foyle agrees, but reneges and asks Robin to help him to earn Olivia's favours. Robin, who had feelings for Foyle all the time, gets jealous and goes to Central Intelligence to betray him.

Foyle learns that the captain of the Vorga has joined a Scoptsy cult on Mars and has had all her sensory nerves disabled, making her immune to conventional torture. Foyle kidnaps a telepath to interrogate the captain and learns that the ship did not rescue him because it was picking up refugees, taking their belongings and ejecting them into space. He also learns that the captain was Olivia Presteign. Now she rescues him from Martian commandos, as she sees in Foyle someone who can match her hatred and need to destroy.

Driven by a guilty conscience, Foyle tries to give himself up to Presteign's lawyer, Regis Sheffield, who is known as a Terran patriot. Sheffield turns out to be a spy for the Outer Satellites and he captures Foyle. Sheffield tells Foyle that when the Nomad was attacked, Foyle was taken off the ship, transported 600,000 miles and set adrift in a spacesuit to be a decoy to attract ships to be ambushed. Instead, Foyle had space-jaunted—teleporting a cosmic distance, very much further than had been previously believed possible—back to the Nomad. Now, the Outer Satellites not only want PyrE, they want Foyle to learn the secret of space-jaunting, and they are ready to use extreme measures.

Presteign reveals that PyrE is activated by telepathy and Robin is enlisted to trigger it to flush out Foyle. Bits of PyrE left exposed by Foyle's tests to determine its purpose cause destruction worldwide but primarily at Foyle's abandoned encampment in St. Patrick's Cathedral, where Sheffield has brought him. The church partially collapses, killing Sheffield and trapping Foyle, unconscious but alive, over a pit of flame. Suffering from synesthesia brought on by the explosion affecting his neurological implants, Foyle jauntes through space and time as "The Burning Man". Finally he lands in the future, where Robin (now married to Yeovil) telepathically tells him how to escape from the collapsing cathedral.

Back in the present, Foyle is pressured by Presteign, Y'ang-Yeovil, and Dagenham to surrender the rest of his cache of PyrE, which had been protected from exploding by its Inert Lead Isotope container, and to teach mankind how to space-jaunte. He leads them to where the rest of the PyrE is hidden but makes off with it and jauntes across the globe, throwing slugs of PyrE into the crowd at each stop. He asks humanity to choose: either destroy itself or follow him into space. Foyle realizes the key to space-jaunting is faith, not the certainty of an answer but the conviction that somewhere an answer exists. He jauntes from one nearby star to another, finding new worlds suitable for colonization, but reachable only if he shares the secret of space-jaunting. He comes to rest back with the cargo cult, where the people see him as a holy man and await his revelation.

== Description ==
=== Composition ===
The novel was outlined by Bester while he was living in Britain, and actually written mainly when he was living in Rome. The project had its origins in a newspaper clipping (or possibly a National Geographic article) that Bester read about Poon Lim, a shipwrecked World War II sailor on a raft, stranded in the South Atlantic. Lim had drifted un-rescued in the Atlantic for a world record 133 days, because passing ships thought he was a lure to bring them within torpedo range of a hidden submarine. From there grew the story of the antihero Gully Foyle, seeking revenge for his abandonment and causing havoc all about him: a future-set retelling of Alexandre Dumas' The Count of Monte Cristo.

Like Edmond Dantès in The Count of Monte Cristo, Foyle is thrown into prison, in this case the supposedly jaunte-proof Gouffre Martel located in caverns. He establishes a clandestine connection to another prisoner, Jisbella McQueen, and through her he is educated to the point where he can conceive a plan to escape and exact his revenge. Escaping with her and locating the wreck of the Nomad, he uses its treasure, as Dantès did, to reinvent himself as Geoffrey Fourmyle.

Bester once wrote that he used playful narration at one point to grab the reader's attention.

=== Publication and reception ===
First published in book form in the UK in June 1956 as Tiger! Tiger!, The Stars My Destination was subsequently serialized in Galaxy, where The Demolished Man had also appeared. It ran in four parts (October 1956 through January 1957), then was published in the US later in 1957.

The novel has often featured in lists of the best science fiction novels of all time.

=== Influence on cyberpunk ===
The novel has been described as proto-cyberpunk, predating the literary movement by over two decades. Specifically, the novel features megacorporations as powerful as governments, a dark overall vision of the future, and the cybernetic enhancement of the body.

=== Influence on widescreen baroque ===
The Stars My Destination was one of the stories mentioned by name by Brian Aldiss in The Billion Year Spree as one of the seminal works in the genre he titled widescreen baroque.

== Allusions ==
The name of Charles Fort Jaunte, who discovers teleportation, derives from Charles Fort, a writer principally of nonfiction, who coined the term "teleportation".

The title "The Stars My Destination" appears in a quatrain quoted by Foyle twice during the book. The first time, while he is trapped in outer space, he states:

Gully Foyle is my name
And Terra is my nation.
Deep space is my dwelling place,
And death's my destination.

Toward the end of the novel, after he has returned to human life and become something of a hero, he states:

Gully Foyle is my name
And Terra is my nation.
Deep space is my dwelling place,
The stars my destination.

Both quatrains are based on a poetic form that was popular in England and the United States during the 18th-to-mid-20th centuries, in which a person stated their name, country, city or town, and a religious homily (often, "Heaven's my destination") within the rhyming four-line structure (see book rhyme). This literary device had been previously used by James Joyce in A Portrait of the Artist as a Young Man and M.R. James in A Warning to the Curious.

Bester may have come across his title expression in the writings of John Whiteside Parsons, one of the fathers of modern rocketry, who was also a science fiction fan and occultist. In 1943, Parsons wrote: "Rocketry may not be my True Will, but it's one hell of a powerful drive. With Thelema as my goal and the stars my destination and my home, I have set my eyes on high".

Bester's initial work on the book began in England, and he took the names for his characters from a UK telephone directory. As a result, many of the characters are named after British or Irish towns or other features: Gulliver Foyle (and his pseudonym, Fourmyle of Ceres), Robin Wednesbury, the Presteign clan, Regis Sheffield, Y'ang-Yeovil, Saul Dagenham, Sam Quatt, Rodger Kempsey, the Bo'ness and Uig ship underwriters.

== Characters ==
- Gulliver ("Gully") Foyle: Last remaining survivor of the merchant spaceship Nomad. Captured by the "Scientific People" on an asteroid, only his face is tattooed according to their customs. The tattoos are later painfully removed, but the scarred patterns left under his skin become visible whenever his emotions flare out of control.
- Presteign: Head of the wealthy Presteign clan, whose interests include a chain of luxury department stores, each managed by an identical "Mr. Presto". Wealthy people like Presteign demonstrate their status by using outmoded methods of transportation and never jaunting if they can avoid it. Presteign holds court in his Star Chamber, an elaborate, old-fashioned office equipped with a bar and staffed by robots. It is designed to disorient visitors and give him the psychological edge.
- Robin Wednesbury: A Black woman, a Telesend, a one-way telepath who can send thoughts but not receive them. Foyle meets her in "jaunte rehab" while pretending to be someone who has lost the ability to jaunte. She discovers his deception, but he kidnaps her and rapes her to intimidate her into silence. Later, as Fourmyle, he recruits her to help him navigate the upper echelons of society. After she discovers who he really is, he offers her the prospect of finding her family, who were refugees aboard the Vorga.
- Jisbella ("Jiz") McQueen: A rebellious woman, serving five years of "cure" in Gouffre Martel for larceny, she turned to crime to rebel against the limitations imposed on women to "protect" them in a world where everyone can teleport. She escapes with Foyle and takes him to a criminal doctor who is able to bleach out his facial tattoos by applying a chemical with a tattoo needle. The process is agony for Foyle, but Jisbella makes him endure it out of her disgust for him.
- Saul Dagenham: The head of a private "special services" agency contracted by Presteign to interrogate Gully Foyle and force him to reveal the location of the derelict Nomad. Dagenham was a nuclear scientist who became radioactive in an accident. He cannot remain in a room with other people for more than a short time.
- The agents of "Dagenham Couriers Inc.": A bizarre collection of freaks who specialize in "FFCC", or "Fun, Fantasy, Confusion, and Catastrophe" to carry out their missions of theft, kidnapping, and espionage.
- Peter Y'ang-Yeovil: Head of a government Central Intelligence agency based on ancient Chinese principles who is also trying to find Nomad. He is "a member of the dreaded Society of Paper Men, and an adept of the Tsientsin Image Makers". Although of Chinese descent and able to speak fluent Mandarin, he does not look Chinese.
- Olivia Presteign: Daughter of Presteign, she is an albino who is blind to visible light, but can see in the infrared spectrum and some radio waves. Like Jisbella, she too is in revolt against her treatment as a woman, and also as a genetic anomaly. Her rebellion takes the form of interplanetary smuggling of refugees. It was on one such mission that she ordered her ship Vorga to ignore the distress calls from Nomad.
- Regis Sheffield: A high-priced lawyer working for Presteign, he is actually an agent of the Outer Satellites coalition.
- "Bunny": Sheffield's personal secretary, apparently Chinese, he speaks Mandarin with difficulty and is said to resemble a frightened rabbit, hence his nickname.

== Speculative science ==
The novel included some early descriptions of proto-science and fictional technology, among them Bester's portrayal of psionics, including the phenomenon of "jaunting", named after the scientist (Charles Fort Jaunte) who discovered it. Jaunting is the instantaneous teleportation of one's body (and anything one is wearing or carrying). One is able to move up to a thousand miles by just thinking.

Jaunting has other effects on the social fabric of the novel's world, and these are examined in true science-fictional fashion. Women of the upper classes are locked away in jaunte-proof rooms "for their protection", the treatment of criminals of necessity goes back to the Victorian "separate system", and freaks and monsters abound.

The second significant technology in the novel is the rare substance known as "PyrE", an extremely powerful explosive which is activated by telepathy. Possession of PyrE and knowledge of the means to detonate it is believed by both sides to be key to winning the interplanetary war.

Bester's description of synesthesia is the first popular account published in the English language and is also quite accurate.

== Reception and influence ==
Initially, reviews of The Stars My Destination were mixed. The well-regarded science fiction writer and critic Damon Knight, in In Search of Wonder (1956), wrote of the novel's "bad taste, inconsistency, irrationality, and downright factual errors", but called the ending of the book "grotesquely moving". In a profile of Bester for Continuum Encyclopedia of American Literature (2005), critic Steven H. Gale cited the novel as a reflection of the author's maturation, addressing as it does "the continued evolution of humankind as a species", a grander theme than those treated with in his earlier work. Gale declared the novel to be Bester's most stylistically ambitious work, citing the use of disparate fonts to evoke synesthesia, the progressively intelligent language accorded to the maturing protagonist, and the framing of the narrative between the variations on Blake's quatrain.

The book has received high praise from many fellow science fiction writers. After generally criticizing unrealistic science fiction, Carl Sagan in 1978 listed The Stars My Destination as among stories "that are so tautly constructed, so rich in the accommodating details of an unfamiliar society that they sweep me along before I have even a chance to be critical". By 1987, when the author died, "it was apparent that the 1980s genre [cyberpunk] owed an enormous debt to Bester and to this book in particular". Neil Gaiman wrote in the introduction to a 1999 edition of the book: "The Stars My Destination is, after all, the perfect cyberpunk novel: it contains such cheerfully protocyber elements as multinational corporate intrigue; a dangerous, mysterious, hyperscientific MacGuffin (PyrE); an amoral hero; a supercool thief-woman..." James Lovegrove called it "the very best of Bester", and Thomas M. Disch identified it as "one of the great sf novels of the 1950s". Joe Haldeman wrote: "Our field has produced only a few works of actual genius, and this is one of them", who also added that he reads the novel "every two or three years and it still evokes a sense of wonder".

Dave Langford reviewed Tiger! Tiger! for White Dwarf #60 (1984), and stated that "the compulsive, pyrotechnic tale of obsession and revenge needs no introduction (read it!)."

According to Samuel R. Delany, the book is "considered by many to be the greatest single SF novel". while Robert Silverberg wrote that it is "on everybody's list of the ten greatest SF novels". Fantasy writer Michael Moorcock praised it as "a wonderful adventure story" that embodies truly libertarian principles. Ty Franck, co-author of The Expanse series, said: "I don't remember any of the other stories in [A Treasury of Great Science Fiction, Volume Two; an anthology of science fiction stories], and I read that book a dozen times. The only story that sticks out in my mind is The Stars My Destination".

In a 2011 survey asking leading science fiction writers to name their favorite work of the genre, The Stars My Destination was the choice of William Gibson and Moorcock. Gibson remarked that the book was "perfectly surefooted, elegantly pulpy", and "dizzying in its pace and sweep", and a "talisman" for him when undertaking his first novel. Moorcock hailed Bester's novel as a reminder of "why the best science fiction still contains, as in Ballard, vivid imagery and powerful prose coupled to a strong moral vision".

In 2012, the novel was included in the Library of America's two-volume boxed set American Science Fiction: Nine Classic Novels of the 1950s, edited by Gary K. Wolfe.

== Adaptations ==
=== Comics ===
In 1963, Australian comics illustrator Stanley Pitt and his brother Reginald worked on a proposed comic strip adaptation entitled Gully Foyle. Bester looked over the strips and gave his approval. A film company, which held the rights to the novel, apparently put a stop to this. Small circulation publications containing the strips appeared in 1967 and 2001.

A graphic novel adaptation drawn by Howard Chaykin, which utilized the complete text of the original novel was first published, in part, in 1979 by Baronet Publishing. The release of the conclusion was delayed due to Baronet's bankruptcy. The second half was released by Marvel Entertainment's Epic imprint in 1992.

=== Radio ===
A dramatisation titled Tiger! Tiger! was broadcast on BBC Radio 4 on September 14, 1991 and repeated on August 16, 1993. It was scripted by Ivan Benbrook and directed by Andy Jordan. Alun Armstrong played Gully Foyle, Miranda Richardson was Olivia, Siobhan Redmond was Robin Wednesbury and Lesley Manville was Jisbella McQueen.

=== Anime ===
A 2004 anime series, Gankutsuou: The Count of Monte Cristo, was originally intended as an adaptation of The Stars My Destination. The copyright holders' refusal to allow an adaptation led the director, Mahiro Maeda, to instead use The Count of Monte Cristo, which had inspired Bester's story.

=== Planned feature film adaptations ===
As mentioned above, one production company had apparently secured the rights to the novel as early as the 1960s. A number of adaptations of the book have been scripted. So far, none have yet made it to the screen. While the novel has long been considered an "unfilmable" work, the screen rights were acquired by Universal Pictures in 2006 and by Paramount Pictures in 2015.

Film adaptations of The Stars My Destination have been frequently rumored. According to David Hughes' Greatest Sci-Fi Movies Never Made, Richard Gere owned the rights to, and wanted to star in, the adaptation following the success of Pretty Woman. At a later point, NeverEnding Story producer Bernd Eichinger had the rights and hired notable comic book artist Neal Adams to produce concept art. Still later, Paul W. S. Anderson was set to direct it, but wound up doing Event Horizon instead. Since then, a number of scripts have been written, but nothing more has happened.

== In popular culture ==
- The Stars My Degradation, an early comic strip by Alan Moore (later with writing assistance from Steve) parodies the "Gully Foyle is my name" rhyme in the first installment.
- In Stephen King's Lisey's Story (2006), the title character recalls it as her deceased husband's favorite novel. King's earlier short story, "The Jaunt" (1981), takes its title from the book, which it names and references it at several points.
- Gully Foyle makes a cameo appearance as an agent for the Jurisfiction organisation in the BookWorld of author Jasper Fforde's Thursday Next series. Another novel in the series, The Well of Lost Plots, uses Stars My Destination as the title of a tabloid newspaper in the fictional universe of Emperor Zhark.
- The Tomorrow People, a British children's TV series, uses "jaunting" to refer to teleportation.
- In the 2000 video game Deus Ex, Gully Foyle is listed as a current resident of the 'Ton Hotel.
- Enzo Paulo Gugino, a character from the John Scalzi novel Zoe's Tale wrote a poem entitled "The Stars My Destination" based on "the title from an obscure fantasy adventure book that he'd never read but whose title stayed with him".
- In Crooked Little Vein by Warren Ellis, the element PyrE is referenced by Zack Pickles when explaining to protagonist Michael McGill the impact of rebel journalism on society and the power structure of society.
- In Death's End by Cixin Liu, the Planetary Defense Council adopts Resolution 479, initiating the Stars Our Destination Project.
- Stars My Destination was the title of a year-long story arc in Starman comics.
- In the mobile game Tokyo Afterschool Summoners, the lore of the character Nomad is based on the contents of the book, as well as the poem "The Tyger".
- Many musical groups, including Stereolab, roadside picnic, NASA Space Universe and Slough Feg reference Gully Foyle and/or the title of the novel. Foyle appears on the cover of Sough Feg's Hardworlder album, along with a song entitled "Tiger! Tiger!".

== Sources ==
- Boucher, Anthony, ed. (1959). "The Stars My Destination by Alfred Bester". A Treasury of Great Science Fiction (Volume Two ed.). Garden City, New York: Doubleday. pp. 361–522, color reference p.465.
- Tuck, Donald H. (1974). The Encyclopedia of Science Fiction and Fantasy. Chicago: Advent. p. 43. ISBN 0-911682-20-1.
