= The Computer Connection =

1975 science fiction novel by Alfred Bester

- Cover of first edition (hardcover)
- Author: Alfred Bester
- Language: English
- Genre: Science fiction
- Publisher: Berkley Books
- Publication date: 1975
- Publication place: United States
- Media type: Print (hardback & paperback)
- Pages: 183
- ISBN: 0-399-11481-5
- OCLC: 1403583
- Dewey Decimal: 813/.5/4
- LC Class: PZ4.B56 Co PS3552.E796

The Computer Connection is a science fiction novel by American writer Alfred Bester. It was originally published as a serial in Analog Science Fiction magazine in November and December 1974, and in January 1975 under the title The Indian Giver; the novel appeared in book form in 1975. Some editions use the title Extro. The novel was nominated for the Nebula Award for Best Novel in 1975 and the Hugo Award for Best Novel in 1976.

== Plot introduction ==
In the future, “The Group”, a band of immortals (who call each other by nicknames based on famous historical characters) exists in secret, pursuing their individual interests. Ned Curzon (nicknamed Grand Guignol) is one of them, who attempts to give immortality to worthy people. He murders them in horrific ways, since immortality comes from being certain you are going to die before being saved at the last moment.

Through their extensive social network, they come across a brilliant Cherokee physicist named Sequoya Guess, who Curzon plots to recruit via murder. Before this plan can be implemented, Guess suffers a disabling mental trauma, and the effort of the immortals to cure this trauma makes him immortal by accident. This also gives him a mental link to the Extro “stretch” computer.

Working outside of expected behavior, Extro seizes control of Dr. Guess, leaving the only people who know what is going on—the Group and Guess's nearest friends—to grapple with the heart and mind of a malevolent machine in the body of an Immortal, a powerful and ingenious man who cannot be killed.

== Reception ==
New York Times reviewer Gerald Jonas reported that Bester tried, but failed, "to make arbitrariness a virtue" in The Computer Connection, concluding that the novel "cannot possibly be as much fun" for the reader as it was for the writer. Arthur D. Hlavaty, a former editor of The New York Review of Science Fiction, wrote that the book gave "an unintentional example of his own theme of the unrecoverability of the past. His long-awaited novel, variously called The Indian Giver, Extro, and The Computer Connection, was a major disappointment—a confused farrago of old ideas and gimmicks." Patrick A. McCarthy, in a review of Carolyn Wendell's 1982 Alfred Bester, wrote that her coverage of The Computer Connection is "very brief but quite accurate in calling attention to this novel's many shortcomings."
