= Star Light, Star Bright (short story) =

- Short story by Alfred Bester
- Country: United States
- Language: English
- Genre: Science fiction

Publication
- Published in: The Magazine of Fantasy & Science Fiction
- Publication type: magazine
- Media type: Print (Paperback)
- Publication date: July 1953

"Star Light, Star Bright" is a science fiction short story by American writer Alfred Bester, first published in 1953.

== Plot summary ==
Marion Perkin Warbeck, referred to as "the doomed man", has discovered children with supernatural powers, which he calls "genius". He is pursuing Stuart Buchanan, a ten-year-old boy who he believes can lead him to these children. Warbeck is a school principal who read an essay by Stuart that describes his friends inventing gadgets beyond known science. When Warbeck attempted to find Stuart, not only had the boy disappeared, but all records about him had vanished, and nobody who was closely involved with him remembered anything about him.

Warbeck tries to solve the mystery by going door to door in Stuart's old neighborhood, talking to people named "Buchanan" under various pretexts to avoid drawing attention to himself. He is waylaid by a gang that runs a scam on people with that name, and he must explain his reasons to them to save his life. Once the gang understands that there might be a fortune to be made, they employ their own methods to track Stuart's family's sudden move to Brooklyn. However, as the gang conduct a search, they disappear one by one. Warbeck is left calling out Stuart's name in the street. Unknown to Warbeck, Stuart is participating in a game of hide-and-seek nearby. Hearing his name, he uses his "genius" to stay hidden.

Warbeck then finds himself trapped on a "road cleaving infinitely through blackness". The boy wished to be left alone, and he formally wished so through the "Star Light, Star Bright" nursery rhyme. The story ends by stating that Stuart unknowingly has a genius "for wishing".

The story describes a fraud known as the "Heirs of Buchanan": confidence tricksters approach people having the name "Buchanan" and offer them—for a fee—a chance to participate in the legacy of President James Buchanan, who is often believed to have died without leaving a will.

== References to real events ==
The Buchanan scam may be a fictionalized version of a scam from the 1930s, when families throughout the United States tried to participate in the supposed estate of a man named William Buchanan, who was believed to have owned valuable real estate on which 99-year leases were about to expire. The scam was described in Reader's Digest in November 1935.

== Publication history ==
"Star Light, Star Bright" was first published in the July 1953 issue of The Magazine of Fantasy and Science Fiction. The story was later included in several anthologies and Bester short story collections, including the following:

- Starburst, 1958
- Star Light, Star Bright: The Short Fiction of Alfred Bester, Volume 2, 1976
- Virtual Unrealities, 1997

== Sources ==
- Star Light, Star Bright title listing at the Internet Speculative Fiction Database
- Alfred Bester. "Star Light, Star Bright". Sci Fiction. SCIFI.com. Archived from the original on June 5, 2008.
