= 5,271,009 =

Short story by Alfred Bester

- Short story by Alfred Bester
- Cover art that inspired the story
- Country: United States
- Language: English
- Genres: Science fiction, fantasy

Publication
- Published in: The Magazine of Fantasy & Science Fiction
- Publication type: Magazine
- Publication date: 1954

"5,271,009" was inspired by this Fred Kirberger painting of a prisoner on an asteroid. Note the serial number "5271009" on the prisoner's chest.

"5,271,009" is a science fiction/fantasy short story by American writer Alfred Bester. First published in The Magazine of Fantasy & Science Fiction, in 1954, it is also known as "The Starcomber".

== Plot summary ==
To repair the mind of insane artist Jeffrey Halsyon, supernatural being Solon Aquila causes Halsyon to live out various wish fulfillment scenarios –all of which are flawed.

== History ==
The story was commissioned to fit a pre-existing piece of cover art, wherein a man in a prison uniform (with the serial number 5271009) is shackled to an asteroid.

Bester subsequently explained "5,271,009" as being the number of decisions a man must make in his life; also, the number features in each scenario in some manner.

== Reception ==
David Langford has described it as "one of [his] favourite shorts (by Bester)", and Tim Sullivan called it "an extraordinary exploration of solipsism."

Critic and editor Sherryl Vint has posited that the story might be read as "an analogy for [Bester's] relationship to sf", while Fiona Kelleghan has described Aquila as "a sort of fallen angel".
