= Fondly Fahrenheit =

1954 short story by Alfred Bester

"Fondly Fahrenheit" is a science fiction short story by American writer Alfred Bester, first published in the August 1954 issue of The Magazine of Fantasy & Science Fiction.

== Synopsis ==
A rich playboy, James Vandaleur, and his expensive "multiple aptitude android" have become two aspects of a single insane murderous personality. Vandaleur's father is dead, having lost the family fortune, and Vandaleur only has the android which, if it works correctly, can bring in more than enough income to support him in the manner to which he had become accustomed. However, the android becomes erratic when his immediate environment exceeds a certain temperature—when the android is put to work in a foundry, it begins to sing and subsequently pours molten metal on the human supervisor when she investigates the singing. When the android is destroyed during a high-speed chase, Vandeleur is shown as continuing his murder spree after purchasing a cheaper model of android.

== Reception ==
In 1999, "Fondly Fahrenheit" ranked 4th in Locus's poll for the best novelette of all time. It has been included in a large number of prestigious science fiction anthologies, including The Science Fiction Hall of Fame, The Road to Science Fiction, The Stars Around Us and Isaac Asimov Presents The Great SF Stories.

Robert Silverberg has stated that "Fondly Fahrenheit" has only one technical flaw: that there is no connection between the first paragraph and the second; he also describes it as a "paragon of story construction and exuberant style." In Strange Horizons, Colin Harvey said that the story "fizzles and spits and crackles like superheated bacon in a pan that's about to catch fire."

== Adaption ==
Bester adapted "Fondly Fahrenheit" for television as Murder and the Android, which aired on October 18, 1959 as part of the Sunday Showcase series. The episode featured Kevin McCarthy in the lead role, whose name was changed to James Valentine, Rip Torn as the android, Suzanne Pleshette as Mari Sutton and Telly Savalas as Cotton. The episode was nominated for a 1960 Hugo Award for Best Dramatic Presentation.

== See also ==
- The Science Fiction Hall of Fame Volume One, 1929–1964, an anthology of the greatest science fiction short stories prior to 1965, as judged by the Science Fiction Writers of America
- Psychological projection – Attributing parts of the self to others
