= Alfred Bester =

American science fiction author (1913–1987)

- Born: December 18, 1913; New York City, U.S.
- Died: September 30, 1987 (aged 73); Doylestown, Pennsylvania, U.S.
- Education: University of Pennsylvania; Columbia Law School
- Occupations: Writer; editor; screenwriter; comics writer
- Spouse: Rolly Bester (m. 1936; died 1984)
- Writing career
- Language: English
- Period: 1939–1981
- Genre: Science fiction
- Notable works: The Demolished Man; The Stars My Destination
- Notable awards: Hugo Award for Best Novel; SFWA Grand Master; Science Fiction and Fantasy Hall of Fame

Alfred Bester (December 18, 1913 – September 30, 1987) was an American science fiction author, TV and radio scriptwriter, magazine editor, and scriptwriter for comics. He is best remembered for his science fiction, including the novel The Demolished Man, winner of the inaugural Hugo Award in 1953.

Science fiction author Harry Harrison wrote that "Alfred Bester was one of the handful of writers who invented modern science fiction".

Shortly before his death, the Science Fiction Writers of America (SFWA) named Bester its ninth Grand Master; the award was presented posthumously in 1988. The Science Fiction and Fantasy Hall of Fame inducted him in 2001.

== Life and career ==
Alfred Bester was born in Middletown, New York, on December 18, 1913. His father, James J. Bester, owned a shoe store and was a first-generation American whose parents were both Austrian Jews. Alfred's mother, Belle (née Silverman), was born in Russia and spoke Yiddish as her first language before coming to America as a youth. Alfred was James and Belle's second and final child, and only son. (Their first child, Rita, was born in 1908.) Though his mother was born Jewish, she became a Christian Scientist, and Alfred himself was not raised within any religious traditions; he wrote that "his home life was completely liberal and iconoclastic."

Bester attended the University of Pennsylvania, where he was a member of the Philomathean Society. He played on the Penn Quakers football team in 1935 and, by his own account, was "the most successful member of the fencing team." He went on to Columbia Law School, but tired of it and dropped out.

Rolly Bester in a 1948 ABC Radio publicity shot

Bester and Rolly Goulko married in 1936. Rolly Bester was a Broadway, radio and television actress, the first to play the role of Lois Lane, which she did on the radio program The Adventures of Superman. She changed careers in the 1960s, becoming a vice president, casting director and supervisor at the advertising agency Ted Bates & Co. in New York City. The Besters remained married for 48 years until her death. Bester was very nearly a lifelong New Yorker, although he lived in Europe for a little over a year in the mid-1950s and moved to exurban Pennsylvania with Rolly in the early 1980s. Once settled there, they lived on Geigel Hill Road in Ottsville, Pennsylvania.

=== Writing career ===
==== Early SF career, comic books, radio (1939–1950) ====
After his university career, 25-year-old Alfred Bester was working in public relations when he turned to writing science fiction. Bester's first published short story was "The Broken Axiom", which appeared in the April 1939 issue of Thrilling Wonder Stories after winning an amateur story competition. Bester recalled, "Two editors on the staff, Mort Weisinger and Jack Schiff, took an interest in me, I suspect mostly because I'd just finished reading and annotating Joyce's Ulysses and would preach it enthusiastically without provocation, to their great amusement. ... They thought "Diaz-X" [Bester's original title] might fill the bill if it was whipped into shape." This was the very same contest that Robert A. Heinlein famously chose not to enter, as the prize was only $50 and Heinlein realized he could do better selling his 7,000-word unpublished story to Astounding Science Fiction for a penny a word, or $70. Years later, Bester interviewed Heinlein for Publishers Weekly and the latter told of changing his mind for Astounding. Bester says that he replied (in jest), "You sonofabitch. I won that Thrilling Wonder contest, and you beat me by twenty dollars."

However, as Bester was the winner of the contest, Mort Weisinger also "introduced me to the informal luncheon gatherings of the working science fiction authors of the late thirties." He met Henry Kuttner, Edmond Hamilton, Otto Binder, Malcolm Jameson and Manly Wade Wellman there. During 1939 and 1940 Weisinger published three more of Bester's stories in Thrilling Wonder Stories and Startling Stories. For the next few years, Bester continued to publish short fiction, most notably in John W. Campbell's Astounding Science Fiction.

In 1942, two of his science fiction editors got work at DC Comics, and invited Bester to contribute to various DC titles. Consequently, Bester left the field of short story writing and began working for DC Comics as a writer, including, and, under the editorship of Julius Schwartz, Green Lantern, among other titles. He created super-villain Solomon Grundy and the version of the Green Lantern Oath that begins "In brightest day, In blackest night". Bester was also the writer for Lee Falk's comic strips The Phantom and Mandrake the Magician while their creator served in World War II. It is widely speculated how much influence Bester had on these comics. One theory claims that Bester was responsible for giving the Phantom his surname, "Walker".

After four years in the comics industry, in 1946 Bester turned his attention to radio scripts, after wife Rolly (a busy radio actress) told him that the show Nick Carter, Master Detective was looking for story submissions. Over the next few years, Bester wrote for Nick Carter, as well as The Shadow, Charlie Chan, The New Adventures of Nero Wolfe and other shows. He later wrote for The CBS Radio Mystery Theater.

With the advent of American network television in 1948, Bester also began writing for television, although most of these projects were lesser-known.

In early 1950, after eight years away from the field, Bester resumed writing science fiction short stories. However, after an initial return to Astounding with the story "The Devil's Invention" (a.k.a. "Oddy and Id"), he stopped writing for the magazine in mid-1950 when editor John Campbell became preoccupied with L. Ron Hubbard and Dianetics, the forerunner to Scientology. Bester then turned to Galaxy Science Fiction, where he found in H. L. Gold another exceptional editor as well as a good friend.

In New York, he socialized at the Hydra Club, an organization of New York's science fiction writers, whose notable members included Isaac Asimov, James Blish, Anthony Boucher, Avram Davidson, Judith Merril, and Theodore Sturgeon.

==== The Demolished Man period: 1951–1957 ====
In his first period of writing science fiction (1939–1942), Bester had been establishing a reputation as a short story writer in science fiction circles with stories such as "Adam and No Eve." However, Bester gained his greatest renown for the work he wrote and published in the 1950s, including The Demolished Man and The Stars My Destination (also known as Tiger! Tiger!).

===== The Demolished Man (1953) =====
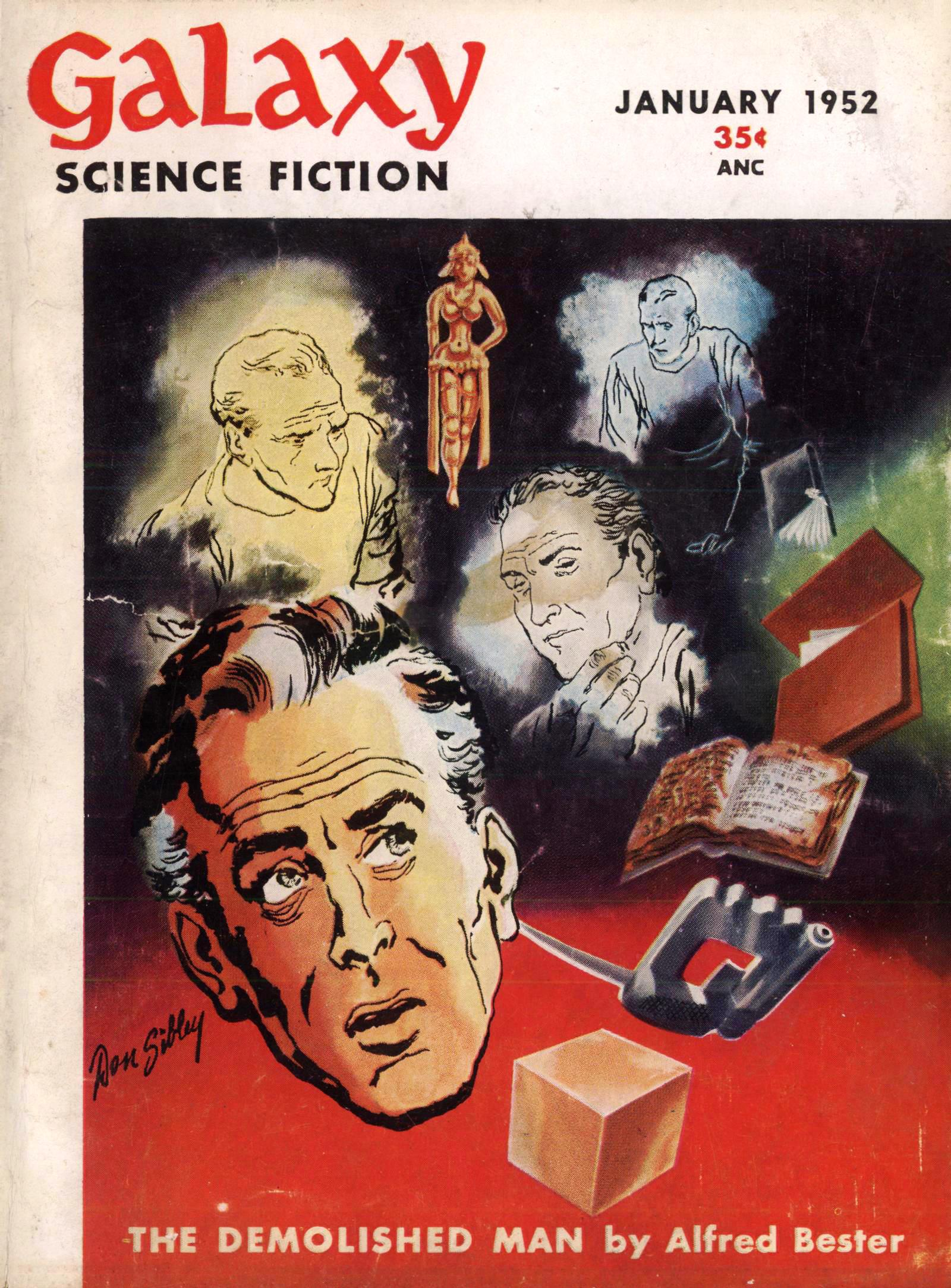
The first installment of Bester's The Demolished Man was the cover story in the January 1952 issue of Galaxy Science Fiction

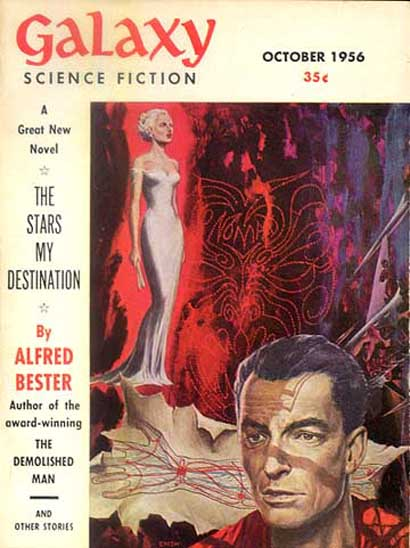
The first installment of Bester's next SF novel, The Stars My Destination, took the cover of the October 1956 issue of Galaxy

The Demolished Man, recipient of the first Hugo Award for best Science Fiction novel, is a police procedural that takes place in a future world in which telepathy is relatively common. Bester creates a harshly capitalistic, hierarchical and competitive social world that exists without deceit: a society in which the right person with some skill (or money) and curiosity can access your memories, secrets, fears and past misdeeds more swiftly than even you.

Originally published in three parts in Galaxy, beginning in January 1952, The Demolished Man appeared in book form in 1953. It was dedicated to Gold, who made a number of suggestions during its writing. Originally, Bester wanted the title to be Demolition!, but Gold talked him out of it.

===== Who He? (1953) =====
Bester's 1953 novel Who He? (also known as The Rat Race) concerns a TV variety show writer who wakes up after an alcoholic blackout and discovers that someone is out to destroy his life. According to Bester, the TV show elements were based on his experiences working on The Paul Winchell Show. A contemporary novel with no science fiction elements, it did not receive wide attention. It did, however, earn Bester a fair amount of money from the sale of the paperback reprint rights (the book appeared in paperback as The Rat Race). He also received a substantial sum of money from a movie studio for the film option to the book. Reportedly, Jackie Gleason was interested in starring as the variety show writer and licensed movie rights to the story; however no movie was ever made of Who He? Still, the payout from the film option was large enough that Alfred and Rolly Bester decided they could afford to travel to Europe for the next few years. They lived mainly in Italy and England during this period.

===== The Stars My Destination (1956) =====
This novel was both widely criticized and praised when it first appeared, but gathered acclaim as a classic work in its own right. It has been recognized as a prescient forerunner of the cyberpunk literary genre, having first been published two decades before the genre was named.

==== Magazine fiction and non-fiction: 1959–1962 ====
While on his European trip, Bester began selling non-fiction pieces about various European locations to the mainstream travel/lifestyle magazine Holiday. The Holiday editors, impressed with his work, invited Bester back to their headquarters in New York and began commissioning him to write travel articles about various far-flung locales, as well as doing interviews with such stars as Sophia Loren, Anthony Quinn, and Sir Edmund Hillary. As a result of steady work with Holiday, Bester's science fiction output dropped precipitously in the years following the publication of The Stars My Destination.

Bester published three short stories each in 1958 and 1959, including 1958's "The Men Who Murdered Mohammed" and 1959's "The Pi Man", both of which were nominated for Hugo Awards. However, for a four-year period from October 1959 to October 1963, he published no fiction at all. Instead, he concentrated on his work at Holiday (where he was made a senior editor), reviewed books for The Magazine of Fantasy and Science Fiction (from 1960 to 1962) and returned to television scripting.

==== Television: 1959–1962 ====
During the 1950s, Bester contributed a satiric sketch, "I Remember Hiroshima", to The Paul Winchell Show. His later story "Hobson's Choice" was based on it.

In 1959, Bester adapted his 1954 story "Fondly Fahrenheit" to television as Murder and the Android. Telecast in color on October 18, 1959, the hour-long drama took place in the year 2359 amid futuristic sets designed by Ted Cooper. This NBC Sunday Showcase production, produced by Robert Alan Aurthur with a cast of Kevin McCarthy, Rip Torn, Suzanne Pleshette and Telly Savalas, was reviewed by syndicated radio-television critic John Crosby:

Despite the fact that the androids refer contemptuously to human beings as people who suffer from glandular disorders called emotions, Torn wants very much to suffer from these disorders himself. Eventually, he does. I have no intention of unraveling the whole plot which was not so much complicated as psychologically dense. If I understand him correctly, Mr. Bester is trying to say that having androids to free us of mundane preoccupations like work is by no means good for us. His humans are pretty close to being bums.

Murder and the Android was nominated for a 1960 Hugo Award for Best Dramatic Presentation and was given a repeat on September 5, 1960, the Labor Day weekend in which that Hugo Award was presented (to The Twilight Zone) at the World Science Fiction Convention in Pittsburgh. Bester returned to Sunday Showcase March 5, 1960, with an original teleplay, Turn the Key Deftly. Telecast in color, that mystery, set in a traveling circus, starred Julie Harris, Maximilian Schell and Francis Lederer.

For Alcoa Premiere, hosted by Fred Astaire, he wrote Mr. Lucifer, which aired November 1, 1962, with Astaire in the title role opposite Elizabeth Montgomery. A light comedy, the story concerned the modern day Lucifer—whose offices are now on Madison Avenue—working with his beautiful secretary to try to corrupt a clean-cut American husband and wife.

==== Senior editor of Holiday: 1963–1971 ====
After a four-year layoff, Bester published a handful of science fiction short stories in 1963 and 1964. However, writing science fiction was at this stage in Bester's life clearly more of a sideline than the focus of his career. As a result, from 1964 until the original version of Holiday folded in 1971, Bester published only one science fiction short story, a 700-word science fiction spoof in the upscale mainstream magazine Status.

Still, as senior editor of Holiday, Bester was able to introduce occasional science fiction elements into the non-fiction magazine. On one occasion, he commissioned and published an article by Arthur C. Clarke describing a tourist flight to the Moon. Bester himself, though, never published any science fiction in Holiday, which was a mainstream travel/lifestyle magazine marketed to upscale readers during an era when science fiction was largely dismissed as juvenilia.

==== Later career: 1972–1987 ====
Holiday magazine ceased publication in 1971, although it was later revived and reformatted by other hands, without Bester's involvement. For the first time in nearly 15 years, Bester did not have full-time employment.

After a long layoff from writing science fiction, Bester returned to the field in 1972. His 1974 short story "The Four-Hour Fugue" was nominated for a Hugo Award, and Bester received Hugo and Nebula Award nominations for his 1975 novel The Computer Connection (titled The Indian Giver as a magazine serial and later reprinted as Extro). Despite these nominations, Bester's work of this era generally failed to receive the critical or commercial success of his earlier period.

Bester's eyesight began failing in the mid-1970s, making writing increasingly difficult, and another layoff from published writing took place between early 1975 and early 1979. It is alleged during this period that the producer of the 1978 Superman movie sent his son off to search for a writer. The name Alfred Bester came up, but Bester wanted to focus the story on Clark Kent as the real hero, while Superman was only "his gun." The producers instead hired Mario Puzo, author of The Godfather, to write the film.

Carolyn Wendell wrote, "I shall always remember the time I saw Alfie Bester in larger-than-life action, at an academic conference in New York City ten years before he died":

Bester had been invited to share a panel with Charles L. Grant, Isaac Asimov, and Ben Bova. He arrived attired in well-worn high-top sneakers, jeans whose major characteristic was that they looked comfortable, and a sports coat whose better days had been years before. He carried what must have been the world's largest jock bag, crammed with newly-purchased bottles of wine that did not quite fit into the zippered closing. He sat down behind a long table with the other writers and managed to behave conventionally for about half the discussion. Then, apparently able to stay put no longer, he leapt up, walked around to the front of the table to be closer to the audience, and paced back and forth, gesturing and talking. The other three writers (none exactly shrinking violets) tried to interrupt but finally lapsed into what might have been either respectful or overwhelmed silence. It was one of the most extraordinary performances I have ever seen.

Bester published two short stories in 1979 and rang in the 1980s with the publication of two new novels: Golem^{100} (1980), and The Deceivers (1981). In addition to his failing eyesight, other health issues began to affect him, and Bester produced no new published work after 1981. His wife Rolly died in 1984. In the following years, Bester dated Judith H. McQuown (pronounced "McQueen").

In 1985, it was announced that Bester would be a Guest of Honor at the 1987 Worldcon, to be held in Brighton, England. As the event neared, however, Bester fell and broke his hip. With his worsening overall health, he was plainly too ill to attend.

Bester died less than a month after the convention from complications related to his broken hip. However, shortly before his death he learned that the Science Fiction Writers of America would honor him with their Grand Master Nebula award at their 1988 convention.

Two works by Bester were published posthumously. The first, Tender Loving Rage (1991), was a mainstream (i.e., non–science fiction) novel that was probably written in the late 1950s or early 1960s. The second, Psychoshop (1998), was based on an incomplete 92-page story fragment. It was completed by Roger Zelazny and remained unpublished until three years after Zelazny's death. When published, it was credited as a collaborative work.

Upon his death, Bester left his literary estate to his friend and bartender Joe Suder.

==== Legacy and tributes ====
- StarShipSofa described Bester as "the godfather of modern science fiction", and made a two-part show about him.
- In Babylon 5, Psi-Cop Alfred Bester is named after him (and the treatment of telepathy in Babylon 5 is similar to that in Bester's works).
- The time-traveling pest named "Al Phee" in Spider Robinson's Callahan's Crosstime Saloon series is based on Bester.
- F. Gwynplaine MacIntyre wrote a series of stories—beginning with "Time Lines" (published in Analog, 1999)—about a time-traveling criminal named Smedley Faversham, who constantly runs afoul of a scientific principle called "Bester's Law" (explicitly named after the phenomena in Bester's 1958 story "The Men Who Murdered Mohammed").
- Firefly: Many of the names of off-camera and minor characters are drawn from the ranks of science fiction writers; under the character name "Bester," actor Dax Griffin played the original mechanic of the ship Serenity.

=== Notable short stories ===
- "Adam and No Eve"
- "5,271,009"
- "Fondly Fahrenheit"
- "The Men Who Murdered Mohammed"
- "The Roller Coaster"
- "Time Is the Traitor"
- "Disappearing Act"
- "Hell Is Forever"

== Awards ==
The Science Fiction Writers of America made Bester its ninth SFWA Grand Master in 1988 (announced before his 1987 death) and the Science Fiction and Fantasy Hall of Fame inducted him in 2001, its sixth class of two deceased and two living writers.

Beside winning the inaugural Hugo Award, he was one of the runners-up for several annual literary awards.

Hugo Award:

- The Demolished Man – 1953 novel

Hugo nominations:

- "Star Light, Star Bright" – 1954 short story (retro Hugo)
- "The Men Who Murdered Mohammed" – 1959 short story
- "The Pi Man" – 1960 short story
- "The Four-Hour Fugue" – 1975 short story
- The Computer Connection – 1975 novel

In the Best Novel categories, The Computer Connection was a finalist for both the Hugo and Nebula Awards and third place for the Locus Award.

== Works ==
=== Science fiction novels ===
- The Demolished Man (1953)
- The Stars My Destination (also published as Tiger, Tiger) (1956)
- The Computer Connection (also published as Extro) (1975)
- Golem^{100} (1980)
- The Deceivers (1981)
- Psychoshop (with Roger Zelazny) (1998)

=== Novels ===
- Who He? (also published as The Rat Race) (1953)
- Tender Loving Rage (1991)

=== Collections ===
- Starburst (1958)
- The Dark Side of the Earth (1964)
- An Alfred Bester Omnibus (1968)
- The Light Fantastic: The Short Fiction of Alfred Bester, Volume 1 (1976)
- Star Light, Star Bright: The Short Fiction of Alfred Bester, Volume 2 (1976)
- Starlight: The Great Short Fiction of Alfred Bester (1976)
- Virtual Unrealities (1997)
- Redemolished (2000)

=== Non-fiction ===
- "Writing the Radio Mystery," The Writer, December 1951
- The Life and Death of a Satellite (1966)

=== Short fiction ===
Title	Publication	Collected in
"The Broken Axiom"	Thrilling Wonder Stories (April 1939)	-
"No Help Wanted"	Thrilling Wonder Stories (December 1939)	-
"Guinea Pig, Ph.D."	Startling Stories (March 1940)	-
"Voyage to Nowhere"	Thrilling Wonder Stories (July 1940)	-
"Treachery on Camoia"	South Sea Stories (October 1940)	-
"The White Man Who Was Tabu"	South Sea Stories (October 1940)	-
"The Mad Molecule"	Thrilling Wonder Stories (January 1941)	-
"The Pet Nebula"	Astonishing Stories (February 1941)	-
"Slaves of the Life Ray"	Thrilling Wonder Stories (February 1941)	-
"The Probable Man"	Astounding Science Fiction (July 1941)	Redemolished
"Adam and No Eve"	Astounding Science Fiction (September 1941)	Starburst
"The McGrabb Bag"	Detective Fiction (October 1, 1941)	-
"The Biped, Reegan"	Super Science Stories (November 1941)	-
"Life for Sale"	Amazing Stories (January 1942)	-
"The Push of a Finger"	Astounding Science Fiction (May 1942)	Redemolished
"The Unseen Blushers"	Astonishing Stories (June 1942)	-
"Hell Is Forever"	Unknown Worlds (August 1942)	The Light Fantastic
"The House That Gaul Built"	The Shadow (July 1944)	-
"Oddy and Id" aka "The Devil's Invention"	Astounding Science Fiction (August 1950)	Starburst
"Of Time and Third Avenue"	The Magazine of Fantasy & Science Fiction (October 1951)	Starburst
"Hobson's Choice"	The Magazine of Fantasy & Science Fiction (August 1952)	Starburst
"The Roller Coaster"	Fantastic (May–June 1953)	Starburst
"Star Light, Star Bright"	The Magazine of Fantasy & Science Fiction (July 1953)	Starburst
"Time Is the Traitor"	The Magazine of Fantasy & Science Fiction (September 1953)	The Dark Side of the Earth
"Disappearing Act"	Star Science Fiction Stories 2, ed. Frederik Pohl (1953)	Starburst
"5,271,009" aka "The Starcomber"	The Magazine of Fantasy & Science Fiction (March 1954)	Starburst
"Fondly Fahrenheit"	The Magazine of Fantasy & Science Fiction (August 1954)	Starburst
"Travel Diary"	Starburst (May 1958)	Starburst
"The Die-Hard"	Starburst (May 1958)	Starburst
"The Men Who Murdered Mohammed"	The Magazine of Fantasy & Science Fiction (October 1958)	The Dark Side of the Earth
"Will You Wait?"	The Magazine of Fantasy & Science Fiction (March 1959)	The Dark Side of the Earth
"The Black Nebulea"	The Magazine of Fantasy & Science Fiction (September 1959)	-
"The Pi Man"	The Magazine of Fantasy & Science Fiction (October 1959)	The Dark Side of the Earth
"Death of a Bandit"	Rogue (June 1962)	-
"I Will Never Celebrate New Year's Again"	Rogue (February 1963)	Redemolished
"They Don't Make Life Like They Used To"	The Magazine of Fantasy & Science Fiction (October 1963)	The Dark Side of the Earth
"The Lost Child"	Rogue (March 1964)	Redemolished
"Out of This World"	The Dark Side of the Earth (May 1964)	The Dark Side of the Earth
"The Flowered Thundermug"	The Dark Side of the Earth (May 1964)	The Dark Side of the Earth
"The Compleat Hobbyist"	Holiday (December 1965)	-
"The Julias"	Escapade (June 1968)	-
"MS. Found in a Champagne Bottle"	Status (1968)	The Light Fantastic
"The Animal Fair"	The Magazine of Fantasy & Science Fiction (October 1972)	Redemolished
"Something Up There Likes Me"	Astounding: John W. Campbell Memorial Anthology (1973)	Star Light, Star Bright
"The Four-Hour Fugue"	Analog Science Fiction and Fact (June 1974)	The Light Fantastic
"The Indian Giver"	Analog Science Fiction and Fact (November 1974)	-
"Here Come the Clones"	Publishers Weekly (Jue 14, 1976)	-
"MS. Found in a Coconut"	Analog Science Fiction and Fact (June 1979)	-
"Galatea Galante" aka "Galatea Galante, the Perfect Popsy"	Omni (April 1979)	Virtual Unrealities
"Never Love a Hellhag"	The Seventh Omni Book of Science Fiction (1989)	-
"The Devil Without Glasses"	Virtual Unrealities (1997)	Virtual Unrealities

=== Comic Books ===
==== DC Comics ====
- Adventure Comics #68, 77–86, 89–90, 92 (1941–1944)
- All-Amercian Comics #53, 56–61, 63–70, 72, 74–76, 79–80, 82 (1943–1947)
- Big All-American Comic Book #1 (1944)
- Comic Cavalcade #4–8, 10–13, 15–19 (1943–1947)
- Green Lantern #20–26 (1946–1947)
- Green Lantern Quarterly #9–17 (1943–1945)

==== Fawcett Comics ====
- Captain Marvel Adventures #7 (1942)

==== King Features Syndicate ====
- Mandrake the Magician (ghosting for Lee Falk)
- The Phantom (ghosting for Lee Falk)

== See also ==
- Golden Age of Science Fiction

== General and cited sources ==
- Bester, Alfred (1976). "My Affair with Science Fiction". Star Light, Star Bright: The Great Short Fiction of Alfred Bester. New York: Berkley. pp. 387–409.
