= List of television stations in Alabama =

This is a list of broadcast television stations that are licensed in the U.S. state of Alabama.

== Full-power ==
- Stations are arranged by media market served and channel position.

Full-power television stations in Alabama
Media market	Station	Channel	Primary affiliation(s)	Notes	Refs
Birmingham	WBRC	6	Fox		
Birmingham	WCIQ	7	PBS	(Note: Licensed to Mount Cheaha, Alabama.) (Note: Satellite of WBIQ.)	
Birmingham	WBIQ	10	PBS		
Birmingham	WVTM-TV	13	NBC, CBS on 13.4		
Birmingham	WDBB	17	Independent, ABC on 17.2	(Note: Licensed to Bessemer, Alabama.) (Note: Satellite of WTTO.)	
Birmingham	WTTO	21	Independent	(Note: Licensed to Homewood, Alabama.)	
Birmingham	WVUA	23	Cozi TV	(Note: Licensed to Tuscaloosa, Alabama.) (Note: Satellite of WVUA-CD.)	
Birmingham	WSES	33	Heroes & Icons		
Birmingham	WGWW	40	Heroes & Icons, ABC on 40.2	(Note: Licensed to Anniston, Alabama.)	
Birmingham	WIAT	42	The CW		
Birmingham	WPXH-TV	44	Ion Television	(Note: Licensed to Hoover, Alabama.)	
Birmingham	WTJP-TV	60	TBN	(Note: Licensed to Gadsden, Alabama.)	
Birmingham	WABM	68	MyNetworkTV, ABC on 68.2		
Dothan	WDIQ	2	PBS	(Note: Licensed to Dozier, Alabama.)	
Dothan	WTVY	4	CBS, MyNetworkTV/MeTV on 4.2, The CW on 4.3, NBC on 4.4		
Dothan	WDHN	18	ABC		
Dothan	WDFX-TV	34	Fox	(Note: Licensed to Ozark, Alabama.)	
Dothan	WGIQ	43	PBS	(Note: Licensed to Louisville, Alabama.)	
Huntsville	WHDF	15	The CW	(Note: Licensed to Florence, Alabama.)	
Huntsville	WHNT-TV	19	CBS, The CW on 19.2		
Huntsville	WHIQ	25	PBS		
Huntsville	WAAY-TV	31	ABC		
Huntsville	WFIQ	36	PBS		
Huntsville	WAFF	48	NBC		
Huntsville	WZDX	54	Fox, MyNetworkTV on 54.2		
Mobile	WKRG-TV	5	CBS, The CW on 5.2, Ion Television on 5.5		
Mobile	WALA-TV	10	Fox		
Mobile	WPMI-TV	15	Roar		
Mobile	WDPM-DT	18	Daystar		
Mobile	WMPV-TV	21	TBN		
Mobile	WEIQ	42	PBS		
Mobile	WFNA	55	The CW	(Note: Licensed to Gulf Shores, Alabama.)	
Montgomery	WAKA	8	CBS, Ion Television on 8.3	(Note: Licensed to Selma, Alabama.)	
Montgomery	WSFA	12	NBC		
Montgomery	WCOV-TV	20	Fox		
Montgomery	WBMM	22	The CW	(Note: Licensed to Tuskegee, Alabama.)	
Montgomery	WAIQ	26	PBS		
Montgomery	WBIH	29	The Walk TV		
Montgomery	WNCF	32	ABC, The CW on 32.2		
Montgomery	WMCF-TV	45	TBN		
Montgomery	WIYC	48	Cozi TV	(Note: Licensed to Troy, Alabama.)	
~Columbus, GA	WHOT-TV	66	Hot 97 TV	(Note: Licensed to Opelika, Alabama.)	
~Meridian, MS	WIIQ	41	PBS	(Note: Licensed to Demopolis, Alabama.)	

== Low-power ==
Low-power television stations in Alabama
Media market	Station	Channel	Primary affiliation(s)	Notes	Refs
Birmingham	WDVZ-CD	3	[Blank]		
Birmingham	WVUA-CD	7	[Blank]		
Birmingham	WNHT-LD	9	TheGrio		
Birmingham	WOTM-LD	19	Independent		
Birmingham	WSWH-LD	22	Various		
Birmingham	WEAC-CD	24	The Walk TV	(Note: Licensed to Jacksonville, Alabama.)	
Birmingham	WTBM-CD	24	Telemundo, Fox on 24.2		
Birmingham	WCQT-LD	27	The Walk TV	(Note: Licensed to Cullman, Alabama.)	
Birmingham	WBUN-LD	28	Daystar		
Birmingham	W32EQ-D	32	Classic shows		
Birmingham	W18ET-D	35	HSN		
Birmingham	W16DV-D	38	[Blank]	(Note: Licensed to Alexander City, Alabama.)	
Birmingham	WUOA-LD	46	Various		
Birmingham	WRDY-CD	47	WEST		
Birmingham	WOIL-LD	47	YTA TV	(Note: Licensed to Talladega, Alabama.)	
Birmingham	WSFG-LD	51	Daystar, TBN on 51.6	(Note: Licensed to Berry, Alabama.)	
Birmingham	WSSF-LD	51	Daystar, TBN on 51.6	(Note: Licensed to Fayette, Alabama.)	
Birmingham	W25FC-D	55	Religious independent	(Note: Licensed to Jasper, Alabama.)	
Birmingham	WBMA-LD	58	ABC		
Dothan	WRGX-LD	23	NBC, The CW on 23.2		
Dothan	WGEI-LD	27	[Blank]	(Note: Licensed to Enterprise, Alabama.)	
Dothan	W29FJ-D	29	[Blank]		
Dothan	WJJN-LD	49	Various		
Huntsville	WTZT-CD	11	Cozi TV	(Note: Licensed to Athens, Alabama.)	
Huntsville	WNAL-LD	27	Various	(Note: Licensed to Scottsboro, Alabama.)	
Huntsville	WTHV-LD	29	Telemundo		
Huntsville	W34EY-D	38	Various		
Huntsville	W20DF-D	45	[Blank]	(Note: Licensed to Russellville, Alabama.)	
Huntsville	WYAM-LD	51	Independent		
Huntsville	WHVD-LD	67	Daystar		
Mobile	WWBH-LD	28	Various		
Mobile	WEDS-LD	29	Various		
Mobile	WMBP-LD	31	Telemundo, Fox on 31.6		
Mobile	WGOX-LD	43	[Blank]		
Montgomery	WTMU-LD	5	Telemundo, NBC on 5.2		
Montgomery	W13DT-D	13	[Blank]		
Montgomery	WALE-LD	17	Local weather		
Montgomery	WDSF-LD	19	Various		
Montgomery	W26FE-D	27	Start TV		
Montgomery	W30EL-D	30	[Blank]		
Montgomery	WAXC-LD	31	Heartland	(Note: Licensed to Andalusia, Alabama.)	
Montgomery	W32FJ-D	31	[Blank]		
Montgomery	WFRZ-LD	33	Religious independent		
Montgomery	WQAP-LD	36	Various		
Montgomery	WETU-LD	39	Daystar		
Montgomery	WAAO-LD	40	Retro TV		
~Columbus, GA	WQMK-LD	18	Independent	(Note: Licensed to Cusseta, Alabama.)	
~Columbus, GA	WCGZ-LD	20	Telemundo, ABC on 9.2	(Note: Licensed to Lanett, Alabama.)	
~Columbus, GA	WAUT-LD	21	Various	(Note: Licensed to Auburn, Alabama.)	
~Tupelo, MS	WEEL-LD	22	[Blank]		
~Tupelo, MS	WUDX-LD	28	Informercials		
~Tupelo, MS	W34FB-D	46	Religious independent	(Note: Licensed to Hamilton, Alabama.)	

== Translators ==
Television station translators in Alabama
Media market	Station	Channel	Translating	Notes	Refs
Birmingham	WJMY-CD	25	WTBM-CD		
Dothan	W03BW-D	3	WTVY	(Note: Licensed to Midland City, Alabama.)	
Montgomery	W35EE-D	5	WTMU-LD		
Montgomery	WBXM-CD	5	WTMU-LD		
~Columbus, GA	W14FC-D	4	WBPI-CD		

== Defunct ==
- WKAB-TV Mobile (1952–1954)
- WYLE Florence (1986–2007)

== Bibliography ==
- "United States TV Stations: Alabama", Yearbook of Radio and Television, New York: Radio Television Daily, 1964, OCLC 7469377 – via Internet Archive
