= WCOV-TV =

Television station in Montgomery, Alabama

- Montgomery, Alabama; United States
- Channels: Digital: 22 (UHF); Virtual: 20
- Branding: WCOV 20

Programming
- Affiliations: 20.1: Fox; for others, see § Subchannels

Ownership
- Owner: Gray Media; (Gray Television Licensee, LLC)
- Sister stations: WSFA, WALE-LD, WIYC

History
- First air date: April 17, 1953
- Former channel numbers: Analog: 20 (UHF, 1953–2009); Digital: 16 (UHF, 2001–2009), 20 (UHF, 2009–2020)
- Former affiliations: CBS (1953–1985); NBC (secondary, 1953–1954); DuMont (secondary, 1953–1956); ABC (secondary, 1953–1960); NTA (secondary, 1956–1961); Independent (January–October 1986)
- Call sign meaning: Will Covington (founding owner of WCOV radio)

Technical information
- Licensing authority: FCC
- Facility ID: 73642
- ERP: 670 kW
- HAAT: 528 m (1,732 ft)
- Transmitter coordinates: 31°58′29″N 86°9′44″W

Links
- Public license information: Public file; LMS
- Website: www.wsfa.com/page/wcov/

WCOV-TV (channel 20) is a television station in Montgomery, Alabama, United States, affiliated with the Fox network. It is owned by Gray Media alongside NBC affiliate WSFA (channel 12), Cozi TV affiliate WIYC (channel 48), Telemundo affiliate WBXM-CD (channel 15), and local weather station WALE-LD (channel 17). WCOV-TV, WIYC and WALE-LD share studios on WCOV Avenue in the Normandale section of Montgomery; WCOV-TV's transmitter is located southeast of Grady.

WCOV-TV was the first television station to be built in Montgomery, beginning broadcasting on April 17, 1953. It was an affiliate of CBS; however, it was on the new ultra high frequency (UHF) band. When Montgomery's allocated very high frequency (VHF) station, WSFA-TV, began in late 1954, it immediately came to dominate the Montgomery market. WCOV owners attempted to have the playing field leveled by proposing either a move of WSFA-TV to UHF or of WCOV-TV to VHF, but neither was approved. In 1964, Gay-Bell Broadcasting acquired WCOV-TV and its associated radio stations; seeking to bolster its position, it attempted to buy WSLA, a VHF station in Selma and another CBS affiliate, but no sale ever materialized.

In 1985, WSLA changed its call sign to WAKA and added Montgomery to its coverage area. Despite prior reassurances from CBS, the network informed WCOV-TV that it would discontinue its affiliation with channel 20. Gay-Bell sold the station to Woods Communications, which operated it as an independent station and discontinued its local newscasts before adding the new Fox network in October 1986. The station initially struggled before Fox programming attracted significant ratings. A 1996 tornado destroyed the tower from which the station broadcast in Montgomery; WCOV-TV did not return to full power until the next year.

Allen Media Group acquired WCOV-TV, WIYC, and WALE-LD in 2023 from Woods Communications and sold the stations to Gray Media in 2026.

== History ==
=== Early years ===
On December 31, 1951, the owners of radio station WCOV (1170 AM)—the First National Bank of Montgomery and the estate of G. W. Covington, Jr.—filed an application with the Federal Communications Commission (FCC) for a new television station on very high frequency (VHF) channel 12 in Montgomery. Six months later, after the commission lifted its freeze on television applications, WCOV amended its application to specify channel 20 in the new ultra high frequency (UHF) band—to the surprise of others—after radio station WSFA also filed for channel 12. The FCC granted the Covington interests—which had reorganized as the Capitol Broadcasting Company—a construction permit on September 17, 1952. Later, WCOV-TV would claim that it was forced to apply for channel 20 when it learned RCA could not deliver a VHF transmitter, but had a UHF transmitter on hand.

WCOV-TV was the first television station in Montgomery, making its first broadcast on April 17, 1953. It operated from a 400-foot (122 m) tower near its studios. Commercial programs started five days later; the station was a primary CBS affiliate but carried secondary affiliations with the other three major networks of the day—NBC, ABC, and DuMont. During the late 1950s, the station was also briefly affiliated with the NTA Film Network.

Christmas Day 1954 brought Montgomery a second television station, this time on VHF, when WSFA-TV began broadcasting as an NBC affiliate on channel 12. The arrival of VHF television in Montgomery created an economic and viewership inequality between the city's two television stations. On August 5, 1955, WCOV's studios were badly damaged by a fire, knocking both stations off the air. The fire was caused by a short circuit inside an electric clock, which led to a loss of an estimated $500,000 total in damages. The station returned to the air one week later. In 1959, WCOV-TV filed to have channel 8 moved from Selma to Montgomery to put it on an equal footing. When that failed, the station instead proposed that WSFA be moved to the UHF band, an idea that drew protests from viewers—such as those in Butler County—which were served only by channel 12 and which could not receive channel 20. The FCC voted not to pursue deintermixture in Montgomery and other markets in 1962. That year also brought the arrival of full three-network service, when channel 32 signed on as ABC affiliate WCCB-TV.

The Covington family sold WCOV radio and television in 1964 for $1.225 million to Gay-Bell Broadcasting, which owned WLEX-TV in Lexington, Kentucky. The new owners built a new 793-foot (242 m) tower at the site of its predecessor. Gay-Bell, however, continued to grapple with its UHF problem in Montgomery. In 1968, it attempted to buy the channel 8 station in Selma, WSLA-TV, which was silent at the time following its destruction by fire, but nothing ever materialized. Channel 20 also continued fighting against multiple attempts by channel 8 to improve its facilities; WCOV-TV had petitioned against applications by WSLA-TV's ownership dating back to 1954.

In 1976, WSLA-TV filed once more for an application to build a maximum-powered site, this time from a tall tower near Lowndesboro. WCOV-TV objected to the proposal and again advocated for the deintermixture of the Selma and Montgomery markets to make all stations UHF; in 1978, it proposed moving channel 8 to Tuscaloosa for educational use and channel 12 to Columbus, with WSFA being reassigned channel 45. The FCC denied the WCOV-TV proposal in May 1980; in July, it then proceeded to approve the WSLA application. Appeals from WCOV and WKAB dragged on for several more years until final approval from the FCC was granted in 1983 and a federal appeals court denied further pleas from the UHF stations the next year.

=== From CBS to Fox ===
WSLA-TV's power increase, according to the FCC administrative law judge that had approved the application in 1981, would not jeopardize the service of Montgomery's two UHF television stations. However, much was on the line for WCOV-TV, as the Selma station, which changed its call sign to WAKA, was also a CBS affiliate. The network had previously reassured channel 20 that it would remain in the network fold, but CBS went back on those claims and informed the station in March 1985 that WAKA would become its sole affiliate in Montgomery the next year, though this was not stated publicly for another two months.

The affiliation uncertainty came the same month as Gay-Bell reached a deal to sell the station to Woods Communications, led by David Woods, son of longtime Alabama broadcaster Charles Woods, for an estimated $4 million; Gay-Bell had also spun off the radio station the year before, and both sales gave the company capital to improve its flagship property in Kentucky. Woods was aware of the impending loss of CBS when he agreed to buy WCOV-TV. CBS was not required to transfer the affiliation to Woods, who closed on the purchase in early December 1985; the network opted to let WCOV-TV remain an affiliate through December 31 as a "courtesy".

If we were drag racing, they all have V-8s and I'm an old four-cylinder. I have an 800-foot tower, and they all have 2,000-foot towers.

— David Woods, in 1990

WCOV-TV's 32-year affiliation with CBS officially ended on January 1, 1986. It intended to soldier on as Montgomery's first independent station. However, within a few months, the burden of having to buy an additional 18 hours of programming per day had channel 20 on the brink of closure. Years later, Woods recalled that he "didn't even have money to buy toilet paper" and advertisers were shying away. A solution came in the form of a Fox affiliation; WCOV-TV joined the upstart network when it launched in the fall of 1986. Fox proved to be a lifeline to channel 20, despite its technical inferiority to other market stations and having axed its local newscasts; network programs boosted the station's ratings and finances. In the 1990s, the station produced a local version of the Fox show Cops, known as MPD, which was among the highest-rated shows in the city.

WCOV-TV's tower in the Normandale area of Montgomery was destroyed by a massive tornado on March 6, 1996. The station was able to restore service for cable customers later that afternoon. WCOV returned to the air on a temporary tower and broadcast at reduced power for months. In January 1997, WCOV-TV began broadcasting from WSFA's 1,630-foot (497 m) tower in Grady with increased power. This doubled channel 20's coverage area and increased the rates it could charge advertisers. During this time, Woods secured the station's future with carriage agreements made with 23 additional cable systems in the Montgomery market.

=== Sales to Allen Media Group and Gray Media ===
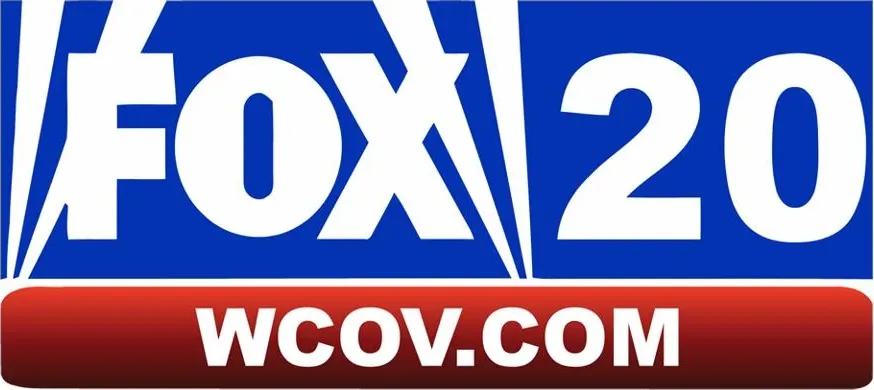
Logo used until July 2025.

On December 15, 2021, it was announced that Allen Media Group, a subsidiary of Los Angeles–based Entertainment Studios, would purchase WCOV-TV, WIYC and WALE-LD for $28.5 million. The sale was completed on April 14, 2023.

On June 1, 2025, amid financial woes and rising debt, Allen Media Group announced that it would explore "strategic options" for the company, such as a sale of its television stations (including WCOV, WIYC and WALE-LD). On August 8, 2025, it was announced that AMG would sell 12 of its stations, including WCOV and WIYC, to Gray Media for $171 million; in the Montgomery market, this would create a legal triopoly with WSFA. The sale was completed on May 1, 2026.

=== Newscasts ===
As a CBS affiliate, WCOV operated its own news department, known during its latter years as Eyewitness News. It spent most of its history as a solid, if usually distant, runner-up to long-dominant WSFA. The station shut down its news department in September 1986, nine months after losing the CBS affiliation and shortly before joining Fox. In its last ratings book, channel 20's early evening newscast finished in second place with only a fraction of the viewership commanded by WSFA. However, it attracted more viewers than WAKA and WKAB combined and had posted a ratings increase. Despite this, Woods decided that even with the ratings gains, the "tremendous financial drain" of sustaining a newscast without network support was not worth the effort. Woods did not believe he could justify spending as much as $100,000 per year to stay competitive and doubted there was enough advertising revenue in the market to support four quality news-producing operations. For this reason, he decided it was best for WCOV to "bow out right now gracefully rather than let everyone walk right past us". In 2006, the station began simulcasting the morning newscast of WBRC, the Fox affiliate in Birmingham.

On January 7, 2008, Woods Communications contracted with NBC affiliate WSFA (owned by Raycom Media) to air a half-hour 9 p.m. newscast in conjunction with another Fox affiliate and Raycom-owned station in Dothan, WDFX-TV. This newscast was later replaced with one produced by WAKA.

On February 3, 2025, the WAKA-produced newscast was replaced by one produced by sister station WAAY-TV in Huntsville.

== Technical information ==
=== Subchannels ===
WCOV-TV's transmitter is located southeast of Grady. The station's signal is multiplexed:

Subchannels of WCOV-TV
Subchannel	Res.	Short name	Programming
20.1	720p	FOX 20	Fox
20.2	720p	ANT TV	Antenna TV
20.3	720p	WEATHER	Local weather
20.4	480i	BUSTED	Busted
20.5	480i	DEFY	Defy

=== Analog-to-digital conversion ===
WCOV-TV shut down its analog signal, over UHF channel 20, on February 20, 2009. The station's digital signal relocated from its pre-transition UHF channel 16 to channel 20. WCOV relocated its signal from channel 20 to channel 22 on September 6, 2019, as a result of the 2016 United States wireless spectrum auction.
