= Baron Services =

American weather technology company

Baron Weather
- Industry: Weather technology company
- Founded: 1990
- Founder: Robert Baron
- Headquarters: Huntsville, Alabama, United States
- Products: Weather radars and commercial weather analysis software
- Website: www.baronweather.com

Baron Weather, previously called Baron Services, is a weather technology company based in Huntsville, Alabama, United States. The company develops weather systems that aid in the detection and dissemination of weather information to customers in the broadcast, government, aviation, marine and automotive industries. These technologies include weather tracking software, Doppler weather radar, systems integration, and personal alerting services, among others. The company holds numerous U.S. patents for weather technology.

The OmniWxTrac system developed in 1992 was the first street-level storm tracking system for broadcast television. The corporation has developed storm-tracking technologies like shear markers and SCITS, as well as the Baron Tornado Index (BTI), which ranks a storm’s tornadic potential on a scale between 0-10.

OmniWxTrac was followed by many additional weather tools including the FasTrac storm tracking system, the 3D VIPIR storm tracking system and the Omni system. In the mid 2010s Baron introduced the Lynx system which has a superset of the previous tools' functionality.

Baron partners with SiriusXM to generate and distribute weather data for aviator, mariner and motorist use. A wide variety of data is available coast-to-coast wirelessly via the Sirius XM signal.

In 2007, Baron Services and L-3 Communications were selected to upgrade 171 U.S. National Weather Service, Department of Defense and Federal Aviation Administration NEXRAD radars to dual-polarization capability.

The company was founded by former Huntsville television meteorologist Bob Baron, who worked for WAAY-TV and WAFF in the 1980s and 1990s.
