= WTHV =

WTHV may refer to:

- WTHV-LD, a low-power television station (channel 32, virtual 29) licensed to serve Huntsville, Alabama, United States
- WZYN, a radio station (810 AM) licensed to serve Hahira, Georgia, United States, which held the call sign WTHV from 1995 to 2014
