= Bluffton University bus crash =

Automobile crash on Interstate 75 in Atlanta

Bluffton University bus accident

Details
- Date: 05:38, March 2, 2007
- Location: Atlanta, Georgia
- Coordinates: 33.8026°N 84.4076°W

Statistics
- Bus: Van Hool T2145 luxury touring coach
- Vehicles: Motorcoach
- Passengers: 36
- Deaths: 7
- Injured: 21

The Bluffton University bus crash was an automobile crash that occurred during the early morning hours of March 2, 2007, on Interstate 75 in Atlanta, Georgia. A chartered motorcoach was carrying 33 members of the Bluffton University baseball team from Bluffton, Ohio, on their way to play Eastern Mennonite University during spring break in Sarasota, Florida. The group planned to travel without an overnight stop on the approximately 900-mile, 18-hour trip. The trip went without incident from Bluffton south to a motel in Adairsville, Georgia, at which time a relief driver began operating the bus for the second half of the trip.

About 5:38 am EST, while operating the motorcoach southbound in a left-hand HOV lane of I-75 in the Atlanta metropolitan area, the driver accidentally entered a left exit ramp, which ended abruptly at an elevated T-junction marked by a stop sign. When it reached the top of the ramp and the stop sign, the bus was traveling at highway speed. The driver lost control of the bus, which slid sideways into a concrete bridge wall and chain-link security fence, then fell 19 feet, landing on its left side across the interstate highway below. Twenty-nine passengers survived the crash, while seven occupants were killed.

The U.S. National Transportation Safety Board (NTSB) dispatched a team to the scene and began an investigation. Local and state police and officials of the Georgia Department of Transportation (GDOT) also investigated. In its final report, the NTSB determined that the probable cause was "the motorcoach driver's mistaking the HOV-only left exit ramp to Northside Drive for the southbound Interstate 75 HOV through lane." A contributing factor to the crash was "failure of the Georgia Department of Transportation to install adequate traffic control devices to identify the separation and divergence of the Northside Drive HOV-only left exit ramp from the southbound Interstate 75 HOV through lane." The NTSB further determined that contributing to the severity of the crash was "the motorcoach's lack of an adequate occupant protection system."

== Bus and driver ==
The bus was a 2000 Van Hool T2145 57-passenger intercity motorcoach that had passed a safety inspection by the Ohio Highway Patrol on February 23, just seven days before the crash. Jerome "Jerry" Niemeyer and his wife, Jean, lived in Columbus Grove, Ohio, near Bluffton. Niemeyer had been driving buses for years for several school events and trips, specifically for Executive Coach Luxury Travel Inc, and he had transported the team on the same route a year before. The Niemeyers checked into a Comfort Inn at Adairsville just after 7:30 pm the evening before the crash. From all indications, Niemeyer had taken the rest period required by the Federal Motor Carrier Safety Standards before taking over the motorcoach.

== Crash ==
The team was from Bluffton University, a Mennonite liberal arts college in Bluffton, Ohio. They were riding a chartered motorcoach operated by Executive Coach Luxury Travel, Inc. of Ottawa, Ohio, near Bluffton. The bus was traveling to a tournament game during spring break in Sarasota, Florida. The group planned to travel without an overnight stop on the approximately 900-mile, 18-hour trip.

Neimeyer took over as the driver earlier in the morning at a motel in Adairsville when it was time for a driver switch. About an hour later, they were in Atlanta, heading south on Interstate 75 in the high-occupancy vehicle lane. Niemeyer, apparently mistaken, drove left onto an exit ramp, which rose upward to a wide elevated road and a T-junction, marked by a stop sign, with Northside Drive (US 41).

Without braking, the bus swerved rightward across the road, attempting to go southbound on Northside Drive. Unable to make the turn, it hit the low barrier wall, which caused the back end of the bus to swing around to the right, pointing it due northbound. The momentum of this swing caused the entire right side of the bus to crash into and then over the low wall and through the guard rail on top of it. Flipping over 270° (¾-rotation), it dropped to the freeway below, landing on its left side and hitting a pickup truck. The pickup's driver, who rapidly accelerated when he saw the bus plunging, was not hurt.

At 5:41 am, a 9-1-1 call came in from a player on the charter bus, pleading for help. The majority of the injured baseball players were transported to Grady Memorial Hospital, the largest hospital in Atlanta with a level 1 trauma center. An entire wing was cleared out for the baseball players and their families. Several players were also treated at Atlanta Medical Center, a Level 2 trauma center. The team coach was treated at Piedmont Hospital.

== Victims ==
Of the 35 people on the bus, seven were killed as a result of the crash.

The 29 passengers that originally survived the crash were taken to Atlanta-area hospitals, including Grady, Atlanta Medical Center, and Piedmont Hospital. Baseball coach James Grandey, 29, and four players were reported in serious or critical condition, one of whom later died. As of March 15, 2007, Grandey was reported in good condition and released. Many of the others were treated and released.

== Investigation ==
Allegedly poor design of the exit itself soon became the primary source of blame. The Atlanta Police Department and National Transportation Safety Board investigated. Meanwhile, preliminary tests ruled out the possibility of a mechanical failure, as well as driver intoxication as blood and urine samples from Niemeyer later showed the presence of ibuprofen, therapeutic levels of the antidepressant Sertraline and the anti-hypertensive drug Atenolol, and concluded that he had no alcohol in his system.

A preliminary report was issued about a week after the crash, according to the NTSB chairman. A final report was released in July 2008. Regarding cause, the NTSB stated:

The National Transportation Safety Board determines that the probable cause of this crash was the motorcoach driver’s mistaking the HOV-only left exit ramp to Northside Drive for the southbound Interstate 75 HOV through lane. Contributing to the crash driver’s route mistake was the failure of the Georgia Department of Transportation to install adequate traffic control devices to identify the separation and divergence of the Northside Drive HOV-only left exit ramp from the southbound Interstate 75 HOV through lane. Contributing to the severity of the crash was the motorcoach’s lack of an adequate occupant protection system. Major safety issues identified in this crash include inadequate HOV traffic control devices, inadequate motor carrier driver oversight, lack of event data recorders on motorcoaches, and lack of motorcoach occupant protection. As a result of its investigation, the Safety Board makes recommendations to the Federal Highway Administration and to the Georgia Department of Transportation. The Safety Board also reiterates four recommendations to the National Highway Traffic Safety Administration.

Of particular interest in the investigation is the design of the exit itself. Several factors played a possible role, including the fact that the exit was an atypical left exit; inadequate advance notice was given of this setup; the HOV exit was signed differently than standard exits; the arrow on the exit sign misled drivers about where the HOV lane continued; and the exit ramp itself had poor signage.

== Legal ==
Several lawsuits were filed by the families of deceased players and by those injured in the crash in the State Court of Fulton County, Georgia. Judge Susan Forsling entered case management orders that included a provision for mediation of all claims in Ohio.

Wrongful death and personal injury claims arising from this crash were settled in phases for a total of $25 million, which was allocated among all claimants by agreement through a joint prosecution group. First, the insurer for Executive Coach paid its policy limits of $5 million required under the Federal Motor Carrier safety regulations. Second, the state of Georgia paid $3 million to the crash victim due to claims of negligent design of the ramp, intersection and signage. The Georgia State Tort Claims Act limits the liability of state governmental entities to a maximum of $1 million per person and $3 million per occurrence, no matter how many were hurt. Third, after the Supreme Court of Ohio ruled that the university's liability insurance policies were applicable to the bus driver because the coach retained control over the driver, a total of $21 million coverage was added to the pool.

At that point, the insurance companies holding the first two layers of the university's insurance coverage tendered their respective policy limits, of $1 million and $5 million, in the spring of 2011. On July 29, 2011, the last insurer for Bluffton University, with limits of $15 million, agreed to pay an additional $11 million, to be allocated among claimants according to their agreement.

== Legacy ==
The Georgia Department of Transportation made changes to all seven of the left-hand lane HOV interchanges in Atlanta, starting March 14, 2007. The final NTSB report urged further changes than the ones already made.

Doctors from Grady Memorial Hospital telephoned congressmen from Ohio and Georgia soon after the crash urging them to put seat belts on charter buses to avoid this situation in the near future.

In December 2009, U.S. Transportation Secretary Ray LaHood announced a new edition of the Manual on Uniform Traffic Control Devices, incorporating changes recommended by the National Transportation Safety Board. One of the changes, in response to the inadequate marking of an HOV lane exit at Northside Drive in Atlanta, is the addition of different lane markings for lanes not continuing beyond an intersection or interchange to give drivers more warning that they need to switch lanes if they don’t intend to turn.

A bill introduced would require safety belts and better protection like anti-ejection windows in charter buses.

== Memorials ==
The funeral for Jerome and Jean Niemeyer took place on March 7, 2007, at St. Anthony's Catholic Parish in Columbus Grove, Ohio. The funeral for David Betts took place at Bryan High School in Bryan, Ohio, on March 9, 2007. Scott Harmon was eulogized on March 7, 2007, at Elida High School in Elida, Ohio. A service for Tyler Williams was held on March 8, 2007, at Philippian Missionary Baptist Church in Lima, Ohio. Cody Holp's funeral took place on March 8, 2007 at Lewisburg United Methodist Church in Lewisburg, Ohio. Zachary Arend's funeral was held at St. Joseph Catholic Church in Paulding, Ohio, on March 16, 2007.

Hundreds of people packed Founders Hall on the Bluffton University campus for the memorial service on March 12, 2007, and an overflow audience listened outside as the student body mourned together for the first time. The service was attended by Ohio Governor Ted Strickland, numerous other public officials, college and university representatives, Mennonite Church officials, AirTran employees, other athletes from colleges in the same conference, and fire and rescue personnel. The memorial ceremony was aired live by satellite to Atlanta, where the team's coach and several other players were still recovering in the hospital.

== See also ==
- 2006 Huntsville bus crash
- Humboldt Broncos bus crash
- List of accidents involving sports teams
