= WBCF =

WBCF may refer to:

- WBCF (AM), a radio station (1240 AM) licensed to serve Florence, Alabama, United States
- WBCF-LP, a defunct low-power television station (channel 3) formerly licensed to serve Florence, Alabama
