= Baron Tornado Index =

Meteorological computer model

The Baron Tornado Index (BTI), also called Vipir Tornado Index (VTI) is a meteorological computer model. Its main usage is to determine the probabilities of a tornado inside a Tornadic Vortex Signature on the rear flank of a storm, to better alert potential high-risk areas for tornadoes and to easily track them.

With the help of NEXRAD weather radar data, mesoscale models and algorithms, the index is measured on a scale of 0 to 10. The higher the BTI value is, the more likely a tornado is on the ground. Shear markers from different colors are used depending on the scale above 2. Yellow markers are used for values between 2 and 3.9, Orange markers are used for values between 4 and 6.9 and red markers are used for values over 7.

The product was developed and is marketed by Baron Services of Huntsville, Alabama, and is a part of the company's VIPIR radar analysis product. The system is primarily used by television stations. The BTI first saw public usage in early 2008. WMC-TV, the NBC affiliate in Memphis, Tennessee was the first station to implement the BTI during the 2008 Super Tuesday tornado outbreak on February 5, 2008, when tracking tornadoes over the Memphis and Jackson areas. The precise tracking of severe storms led WMC-TV in a significant viewer rating.
