= WYLE (TV) =

Television station in Florence, Alabama (1986–2007)

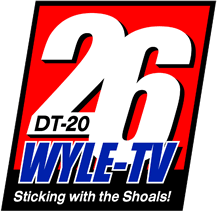
- Florence, Alabama; United States
- Channels: Analog: 26 (UHF); Digital: 20 (UHF, never built)
- Branding: WYLE-TV 26

Programming
- Affiliations: The WB (1990s); Shop at Home; Jewelry TV

Ownership
- Owner: Alabama Management Company (1982–1988); Bridgerland Television (1988–1993); ETC Communications, Inc. (1993–2009)

History
- Founded: January 11, 1982
- First air date: April 19, 1986
- Last air date: February 8, 2007 (license canceled March 12, 2009)
- Former call signs: WTUK (1982–1985); WTRT (1985–1993)

Technical information
- Licensing authority: FCC
- Facility ID: 6816
- ERP: 48.9 kW
- HAAT: 278.4 m (913 ft)
- Transmitter coordinates: 34°37′41.2″N 87°44′32.4″W

Links
- Public license information: Public file; LMS

WYLE (channel 26) was a television station in Florence, Alabama, United States, owned by ETC Communications, Inc. The station's transmitter was located on Underwood Mountain Road in unincorporated southern Colbert County.

WYLE was founded January 11, 1982, and went silent on February 8, 2007, due to financial difficulties. ETC's license to operate the station was canceled by the Federal Communications Commission (FCC) on March 12, 2009, due to failure to transmit for a period of 12 consecutive months.

== History ==
The Federal Communications Commission (FCC) granted a construction permit to Alabama Management Company on January 11, 1982, to build a full-service television station to serve Florence, Alabama, on UHF channel 26. Originally given the call sign WTUK, it changed to WTRT in December 1985. On April 19, 1986, the station began broadcasting and was licensed November 24, 1986. Alabama Management Company sold the station to Bridgerland Television on December 1, 1988.

By 1993, the station was in financial trouble. ETC Communications bought the station out of bankruptcy on June 11, 1993, and changed its call sign to WYLE two weeks later, but being a small operation, ETC Communications was never able to steer the station away from financial danger. For a brief time in the mid-1990s, it became an affiliate of The WB Television Network. WYLE was granted a permit to build digital television facilities on UHF channel 20 on December 11, 2001, but was forced to seek several extensions of its permit due to financial hardship and inability to secure financing. The digital facilities were never built.

In 2005, the combination of losing its primary prime time programming and the death of Lester White, president and CEO of ETC Communications, left the station in severe financial distress, and it was forced to go silent February 8, 2007.

Unable to find an out-of-market buyer, ETC Communications sought to sell the station to the owners of WHDF (channel 15), seeking a waiver of the rule which prohibited duopolies in a market with fewer than eight owners. The FCC denied the waiver. Despite broadcasting a 24-hour test signal beginning February 3, 2008, to avoid being silent for 12 consecutive months, the FCC ruled that the test signal was insufficient, and canceled the station's license and all outstanding applications and permits on March 12, 2009. The loss of WYLE's license and the fact the station never aired a digital signal on channel 20 are among the reasons CBS affiliate WHNT-TV was allowed to move its digital broadcasts back to channel 19 after the analog shutdown.
