= WZDX =

Television station in Huntsville, Alabama

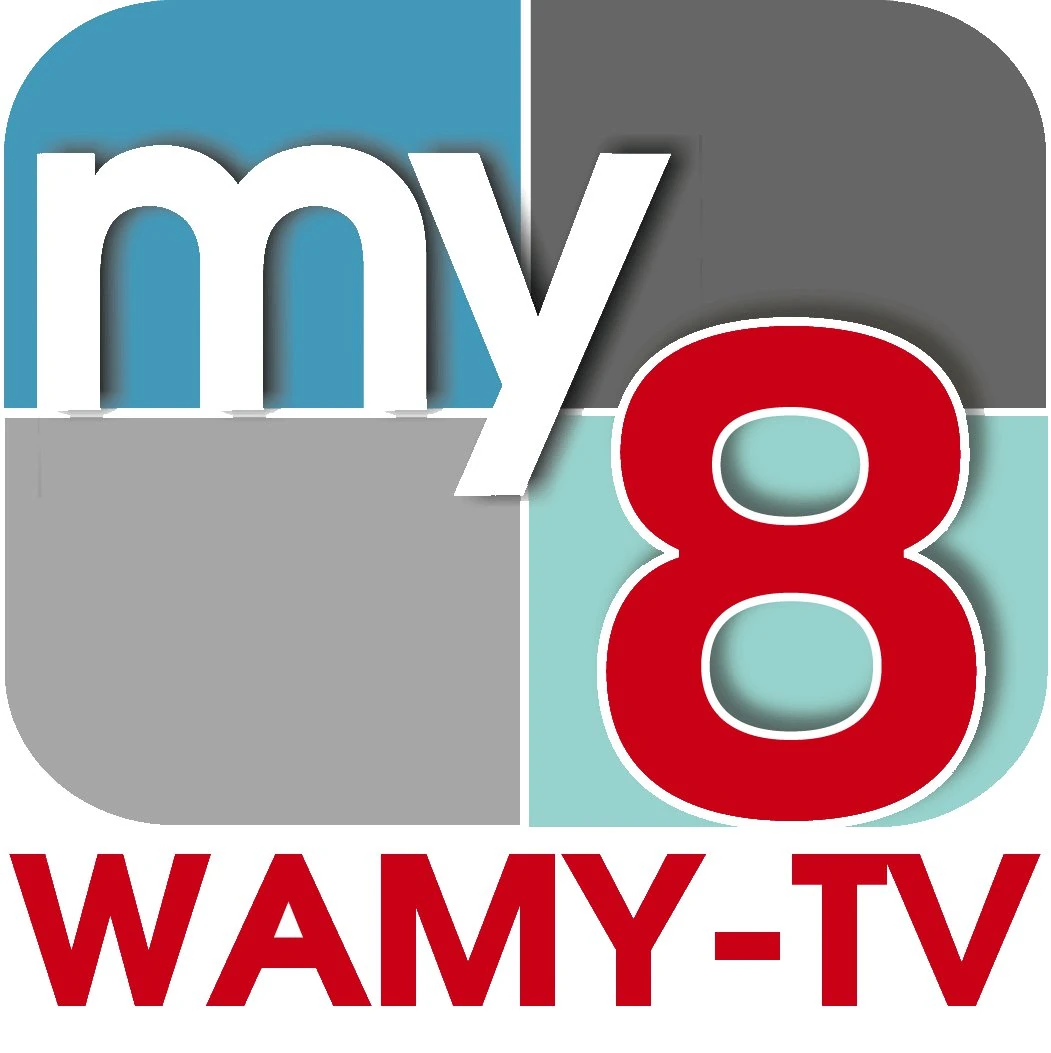
- Huntsville–Decatur–Florence, Alabama; United States
- City: Huntsville, Alabama
- Channels: Digital: 18 (UHF); Virtual: 54
- Branding: Fox 54, My8 (54.2)

Programming
- Affiliations: 54.1: Fox; 54.2: Independent with MyNetworkTV; for others, see § Subchannels

Ownership
- Owner: Tegna Inc., a subsidiary of Nexstar Media Group; (Tegna Broadcast Holdings, LLC)
- Sister stations: Nexstar: WHNT-TV, WHDF

History
- First air date: April 14, 1985
- Former channel numbers: Analog: 54 (UHF, 1985–2009); Digital: 41 (UHF, 2002–2020)
- Former affiliations: Independent (1985–1987)

Technical information
- Licensing authority: FCC
- Facility ID: 28119
- ERP: 522 kW
- HAAT: 525.3 m (1,723 ft)
- Transmitter coordinates: 34°44′12.8″N 86°31′58.9″W

Links
- Public license information: Public file; LMS
- Website: www.rocketcitynow.com

WZDX (channel 54) is a television station in Huntsville, Alabama, United States, affiliated with Fox and MyNetworkTV. It is owned by the Tegna subsidiary of Nexstar Media Group; Nexstar also owns CBS affiliate WHNT-TV (channel 19) and CW station WHDF (channel 15). WZDX's studios are located on North Memorial Parkway (US 72/231/431) in Huntsville, and its transmitter is located on Monte Sano Mountain.

WZDX began broadcasting in April 1985 as the first independent station for the Huntsville area; it became a Fox affiliate in November 1987. Its original owner, Media Central, filed for bankruptcy that year and eventually sold the station in 1990 to a consortium of Citicorp and Milton Grant, marking the latter's return to TV station ownership after a prior bankruptcy. The station started a cable channel that served as the local affiliate of The WB—predecessor to its MyNetworkTV subchannel—in 2001. A local newscast, produced at first out-of-state and then by local ABC affiliate WAAY-TV, began to air in 2008.

The Grant stations were acquired by Nexstar Broadcasting Group in 2013; Nexstar brought local news production in-house by establishing its own newsroom in 2016, and it formed a duopoly in the market by acquiring WHDF two years later. When Nexstar acquired Tribune Media, owner of WHNT-TV, in 2019, it retained that station and WHDF and spun out WZDX along with other stations to Tegna. Nexstar and Tegna merged in 2026.

== History ==
=== Establishment and construction ===
In 1975, Thomas Barr and James Cleary under the name Pioneer Communications petitioned the Federal Communications Commission (FCC) to add another television channel to the Huntsville area for the purpose of building an independent station. At the time, only four channels were assigned to Huntsville: 19, 25, 31, and 48. The FCC proposed adding channel 54, but two Huntsville stations, WAAY-TV and WYUR-TV, opposed the proposal. In 1977, the FCC suggested inserting channel 54 at Decatur, Alabama, which already had channel 23. However, unlike channel 54, channel 23 could not be used at Monte Sano—the main television transmission site in the region, resulting in low interest.

Channel 54 was ultimately added to Huntsville, but there were no applications on file until C. Michael Norton, an attorney from Nashville, Tennessee, applied for it in September 1981 after seeing it on a list of unused TV allocations. Norton was soon joined by other applicants, with the FCC selecting Community Service Broadcasting, a company owned by John Pauza of Chattanooga, Tennessee, and Joel Katz of Atlanta. Pauza owned Media Central, which specialized in the construction of new independent stations in medium markets.

For two years, Media Central missed a series of deadlines. In February 1983, after being selected for the construction permit, Media Central announced it intended to begin broadcasting that fall. By that fall, the target date had shifted to spring 1984. Issues with locating the station's tower impeded a launch at that time, but in late 1984, channel 54 began to take shape. A tower site was purchased in August, the call letters WZDX were assigned in September, and construction began in November. Even then, the station did not start broadcasting in 1984; the antenna was not hoisted onto the station's new tower on Green Mountain until March 1985.

From studios on Mastin Lake Road in northeast Huntsville, WZDX first signed on April 14, 1985, as Northern Alabama's first independent station and the area's first new outlet to launch in 22 years. Programming consisted of syndicated reruns, movies, and short local newsbreaks. The station cost the owners between $5 million and $6 million to put on the air.

When the Fox network began late-night service on October 9, 1986, WZDX initially abstained from affiliating with the network unlike many other strong independent TV stations across the country that had signed on with them, despite the network wanting the station "badly". Program director David Godbout felt that his weekend shows were already attracting ratings and that he would have to charge too much for advertising within Fox programming for it to work economically. This was a posture shared by the entire Media Central chain at the network's launch. However, after Godbout left in late 1987, WZDX joined Fox in December of that year, becoming the fifth Media Central outlet to join the network in 1987.

The late 1980s were times of uncertainty for Media Central. The company filed for bankruptcy protection in July 1987, and Act III Broadcasting submitted a bid to buy WZDX and WDBD in Jackson, Mississippi, the next year; both were among Media Central's most desirable properties. Act III's bid was rejected, as were proposals from Media Central itself and Maryland investment firm Donatelli & Klein, which did come away with WDBD and WDSI-TV in Chattanooga.

=== Grant Broadcasting ownership ===
The bankruptcy court approved the acquisition of the station by a consortium of Citicorp and Milton Grant in August 1989; the $6.1 million transaction was approved in January 1990. While WZDX represented Citicorp's first venture into broadcasting, WZDX became the first outlet in Grant's return to station ownership. Grant Communications was the successor to the original Grant Broadcasting System, a three-station chain of independent outlets that filed for bankruptcy protection in 1986 and was ultimately sold to its bondholders.

Grant obtained rights to WB network programming in the Huntsville market in 1999, airing it in late night hours on WZDX; the move was a consequence of Superstation WGN ceasing carriage of WB programs. The company then announced it would launch full-time WB channels in Huntsville and two other markets where it owned stations—the Quad Cities of Iowa and Illinois and Roanoke, Virginia—in December 2000. "WAWB", known as "The Valley's WB", launched as a cable channel in October 2001. When The WB and UPN merged into The CW in 2006, the merged network selected UPN affiliate WHDF (channel 15), and "WAWB" became "WAMY", broadcasting MyNetworkTV.

WZDX began broadcasting a digital signal on June 1, 2002. In 2004, the station moved its broadcasting equipment from Green Mountain to Monte Sano on the replacement tower for WAAY-TV, whose mast collapsed during repair work in September 2003, killing three.

=== Nexstar and Tegna ownership ===
On November 6, 2013, Nexstar Broadcasting Group announced that it would purchase the Grant stations, including WZDX, for $87.5 million. The sale was completed on December 1, 2014. Four years later, in July 2018, Nexstar agreed to acquire WHDF from Lockwood Broadcast Group for $2.25 million; Nexstar concurrently took over WHDF's operations through a time brokerage agreement. The sale was completed on November 9, creating a duopoly with WZDX.

On December 3, 2018, less than a month after closing on its purchase of WHDF, Nexstar announced it would acquire the assets of Tribune Media—owner of CBS affiliate WHNT-TV since December 2013—for $6.4 billion in cash and debt. WHNT-TV and WZDX, as two of the four highest-rated stations in the market, could not be owned together, though Nexstar could own either station plus WHDF. Nexstar decided to retain the higher-rated WHNT-TV along with WHDF and sell WZDX to Tegna Inc. after finalizing the Tribune sale; WZDX was one of 19 stations disposed by Nexstar to Tegna and the E. W. Scripps Company in separate deals worth $1.32 billion. The sale of Tribune to Nexstar was approved by the FCC on September 16. Nexstar acquired Tegna in a deal announced in August 2025 and completed in March 2026. The deal included approval for Nexstar to own three station licenses in markets such as Huntsville.

== News operation ==
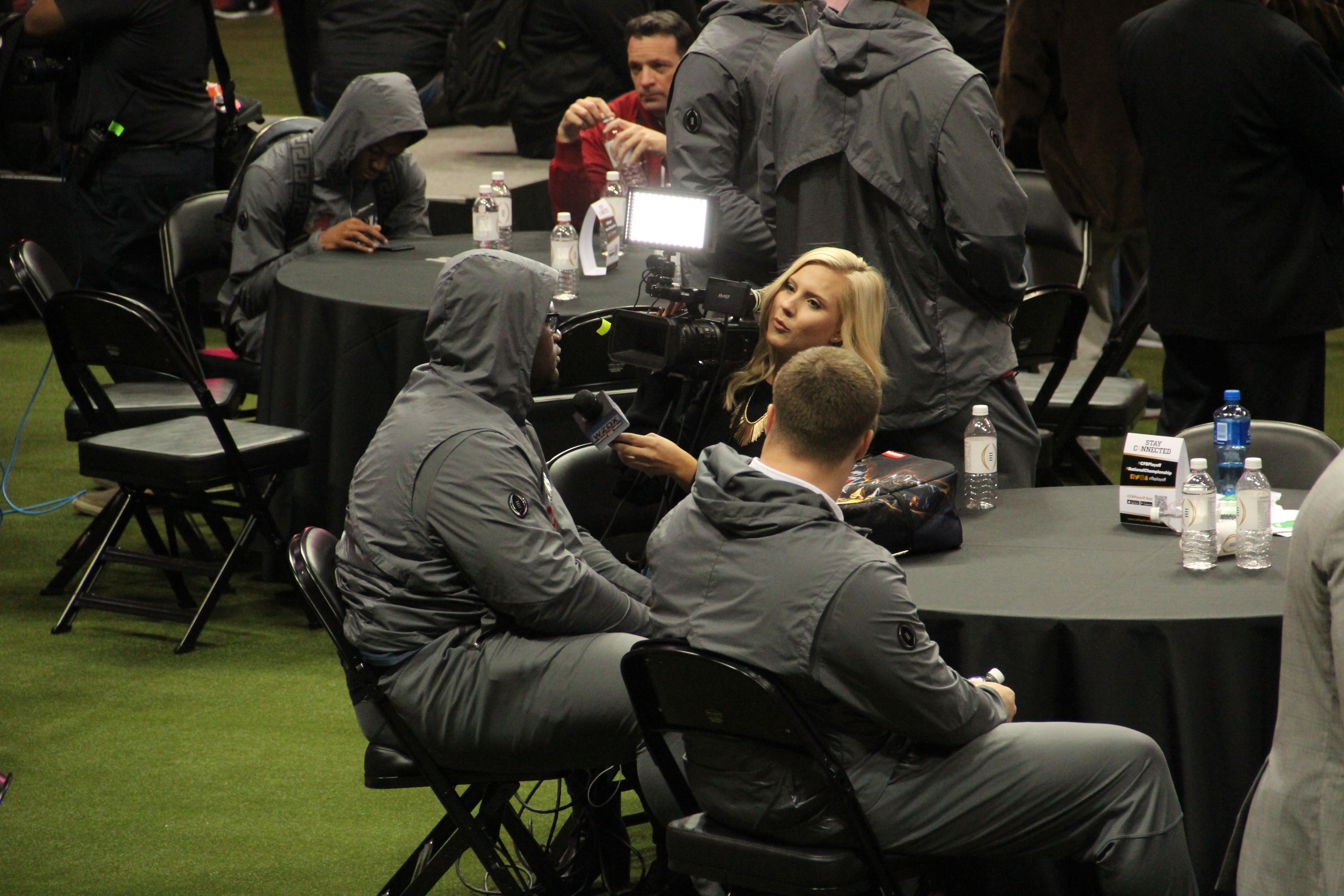
A WZDX anchor conducting an interview at the 2018 College Football Playoff National Championship media day

In January 2008, WZDX launched a 30-minute prime time newscast branded as Fox 54 Nine O'Clock News. It was produced by Independent News Network (INN) in Davenport, Iowa; two local reporters contributed local news stories to the news program, which was presented from Davenport. It was the second prime time newscast in the market, as WAAY had previously produced one for air on WHDF from 2000 to 2001. The INN program continued to air for two and a half years and was replaced in September 2010 with a 9 p.m. newscast produced by WAAY; WAAY news personnel were joined by Ellis Eskew, a WZDX reporter.

Nexstar announced in December 2015 that WZDX would launch a standalone news operation on April 4, 2016. Concurrently, the station's newscast was extended to an hour.

== Technical information ==
=== Subchannels ===
WZDX broadcasts from a tower on Monte Sano Mountain. Its signal is multiplexed:

Subchannels of WZDX
Subchannel	Res.	Short name	Programming
54.1	720p	WZDX-HD	Fox
54.2	480i	MyNet	Independent with MyNetworkTV
54.3	480i	MeTV	MeTV
54.4	480i	Escape	Ion Mystery
54.5	480i	Crime	True Crime Network
54.6	480i	Quest	Quest
54.7	480i	NEST	The Nest
54.8	480i	NOSEY	Nosey → Court TV (soon)
54.9	480i	COMET	Comet

=== Analog-to-digital conversion ===
WZDX shut down its analog signal, over UHF channel 54, on June 12, 2009, as part of the federally mandated transition from analog to digital television; the station continued to broadcast on channel 41, using virtual channel 54. It was then repacked to channel 18 in 2020.
