= ARMOR Doppler Weather Radar =

Weather research radar at Huntsville International Airport

Coordinates: 34°38′46″N 86°46′17″W

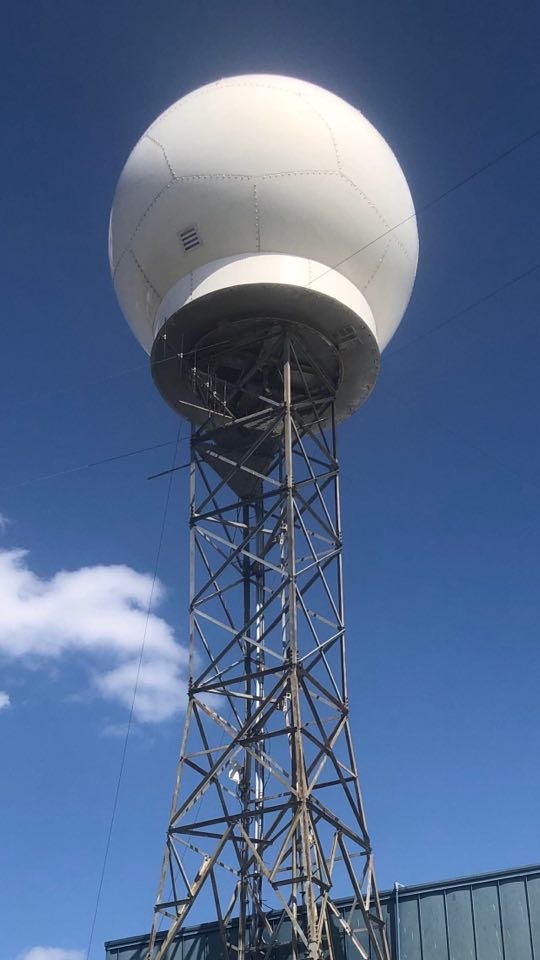
- ARMOR Doppler Radar at KHSV in 2021
- Country of origin: USA
- Introduced: 2002
- No. built: 1
- Type: Weather radar
- Frequency: 5,625 MHz (C Band)
- PRF: Adjustable 250 to 2,000 Hz
- Beamwidth: 1.0° nominal - oversampled up to 0.5°
- Pulsewidth: Adjustable 0.4 to 4 μs
- RPM: 6 rpm
- Altitude: 206 m (676 ft)
- Diameter: 3.7 m (12 ft)
- Azimuth: 360°
- Power: 350 kW

ARMOR (Advanced Radar for Meteorological and Operational Research) Doppler weather radar is a C-Band, Dual-Polarimetric Doppler Weather Radar, located at the Huntsville International Airport in Huntsville, Alabama. The radar is a collaborative effort between WHNT-TV and the University of Alabama in Huntsville. Live data for the radar is only available to a limited audience, such as UAH employees and NWS meteorologists. All ARMOR data is archived at the National Space Science and Technology Center located on the UAH campus.

== History ==
This radar was originally a National Weather Service (NWS) local warning radar (WSR-74C) installed in 1977. It was refurbished and upgraded to Pulse-Doppler capabilities in 1991. When the NEXRAD network replaced previous NWS radars, it was donated to the UAH Department of Atmospheric Science in 2002 and upgraded to dual-polarimetry using the SIGMET Antenna Mounted Receiver in the fall 2004.

Baron Radar division of Baron Services, Inc., Huntsville, AL, upgraded the transmitter in 2005 to a 350 kW VHDD-350C Magnetron transmitter with a solid state modulator. In the fall of 2006, a high performance Seavey dual-polarization antenna and Orbit pedestal were purchased for ARMOR by the same company and made fully functional by the end of October.

ARMOR is the first dual polarimetric radar used in broadcast television news, and one of the first systems of its type open for educational use to a public university, The University of Alabama in Huntsville (UAH).

== Description ==
ARMOR is a modified WSR-74 C-Band (5625 MHz) radar with a 0.5 - 1.0° resolution in azimuth and a spatial resolution varying from 60 to 500 meters, with a typical resolution of 150m. ARMOR sits 206 meters above sea level. The pulse length can vary from 0.4 to 4 microseconds and its peak power is 350 kW. ARMOR's antenna is 3.7 m, or 12 feet, in diameter, and its typical PRF ranges from 250 to 2000 Hz. At its maximum, its rotation rate is 36 degrees/second. It transmits and receives vertical and horizontal polarized signals and operates with a SIGMET RVP8 signal processor. ARMOR is capable of area-specific sector scans, and unlike the NEXRAD Network, can be manually operated.

== Usages ==
The following is information detailing common use-cases of ARMOR:

- Technology transfer via use of ARMOR in the broadcast meteorology domain.
- Real-time operational feed to NWS for nowcasting and training at NWS WFO Huntsville
- Supports basic thunderstorm, cloud physics, cloud electrification and precipitation research within the UAH/NASA Severe Thunderstorm Observations and Research Meteorological NETwork (STORM-NET)
- Source for Satellite precipitation mission ground truth and physical validation via precipitation microphysics retrieval and kinematic measurements (dual-Doppler)
- Quantitative Precipitation Estimation (QPE) for surface hydrological and water cycle studies
- Operational meteorological decision support tool development and data assimilation (e.g. NASA-SPoRT)
- Detailed cloud kinematic, microphysical, electrification, and lightning studies using the NASA Northern Alabama Lightning Mapping Array (NASA-MSFC/NSSTC Thunderstorm and Lightning Group), ARMOR polarimetric variables and real-time dual-Doppler capability
- Potential hydrological data input for assimilation into local distributed runoff models, regional flood plain studies/planning
- Near surface wind retrievals for assimilation into pollutant dispersion models
- Boundary layer studies including identification of biological flyers

== Users ==
In a unique partnership, this research radar was once used by meteorologists at WHNT-TV for forecasting and on air severe weather coverage, making ARMOR the first dual polarimetric capable radar utilized by a television station. The data received from the radar is continuously archived at the National Space Science and Technology Center at UAH for full volumetric and surveillance scans.

ARMOR also deploys a live feed to the Huntsville National Weather Service Office making it one of the first NWS offices to gain first hand experience with dual-pol radar. Currently, as of 2022, the entirety of the National NEXRAD network operates with dual-polarimetric capabilities.
