= WALE-LD =

Television station in Montgomery, Alabama

- Montgomery, Alabama; United States
- Channels: Digital: 16 (UHF); Virtual: 17
- Branding: WALE TV; Montgomery Weather Channel

Programming
- Affiliations: 17.1: local weather; for others, see § Subchannels

Ownership
- Owner: Gray Media; (Gray Television Licensee, LLC)
- Sister stations: WCOV-TV, WIYC

History
- Founded: June 14, 2013
- First air date: January 20, 2015
- Former call signs: W17DX-D (2013–2015)
- Former channel numbers: Digital: 16 (UHF, 2015–2021)
- Former affiliations: True Crime Network (2015–2022)
- Call sign meaning: Whale

Technical information
- Licensing authority: FCC
- Facility ID: 181989
- Class: LD
- ERP: 15 kW
- HAAT: 236.9 m (777 ft)
- Transmitter coordinates: 32°20′7″N 86°17′16″W

Links
- Public license information: LMS
- Website: www.thewale.com

WALE-LD (channel 17) is a low-power television station in Montgomery, Alabama, United States. It is owned by Gray Media alongside NBC affiliate WSFA (channel 12), Fox affiliate WCOV-TV (channel 20), Cozi TV affiliate WIYC (channel 48), and Telemundo affiliate WBXM-CD (channel 18). WALE-LD, WCOV-TV and WIYC share studios on WCOV Avenue in the Normandale section of Montgomery, where WALE-LD's transmitter is also located.

== History ==
On December 15, 2021, it was announced that Allen Media Group, a subsidiary of Los Angeles–based Entertainment Studios, would purchase WALE-LD, WCOV-TV and WIYC from Woods Communications Corporation for $28.5 million; the sale was completed on April 14, 2023.

At some point in 2022, the station dropped True Crime Network from its main channel and switched to a 24-hour local weather format, known as the Montgomery Weather Channel.

On June 1, 2025, amid financial woes and rising debt, Allen Media Group announced that it would explore "strategic options" for the company, such as a sale of its television stations (including WALE-LD, WCOV and WIYC). On August 8, 2025, it was announced that AMG would sell 13 of its stations, including WALE-LD, to Gray Media for $171 million; the sale was completed on May 1, 2026.

== Subchannels ==
The station's signal is multiplexed:

Subchannels of WALE-LD
| Channel | Res. | Short name | Programming |
|---|---|---|---|
| 17.1 | 480i | WALE-LD | Montgomery Weather Channel (local weather) |
| 17.2 | 480i | CourtTV | [Blank] (4:3) |
| 17.3 | 480i | WCOV | Fox (WCOV-TV) in SD |
| 17.5 | 480i | Movies | Movies! |
| 17.6 | 480i | H and I | Heroes & Icons |
| 17.7 | 480i | Comet | Comet |

Simulcast of subchannels of another station
