= WHNT-TV =

Television station in Huntsville, Alabama

- Huntsville–Decatur–Florence, Alabama; United States
- City: Huntsville, Alabama
- Channels: Digital: 19 (UHF); Virtual: 19
- Branding: WHNT-TV 19; News 19; North Alabama's CW 15 (19.2)

Programming
- Affiliations: 19.1: CBS; 19.2: The CW; 19.3: Antenna TV

Ownership
- Owner: Nexstar Media Group; (Tribune Broadcasting Company II LLC)
- Sister stations: WHDF; Tegna: WZDX

History
- First air date: November 28, 1963
- Former channel numbers: Analog: 19 (UHF, 1963–2009); Digital: 59 (UHF, 1999–2009)
- Call sign meaning: Huntsville

Technical information
- Licensing authority: FCC
- Facility ID: 48693
- ERP: 250 kW
- HAAT: 531 m (1,742 ft)
- Transmitter coordinates: 34°44′19″N 86°31′56″W

Links
- Public license information: Public file; LMS
- Website: whnt.com

WHNT-TV (channel 19) is a television station in Huntsville, Alabama, United States, affiliated with CBS. It is owned by Nexstar Media Group alongside CW station WHDF (channel 15); Nexstar's Tegna subsidiary owns Fox affiliate WZDX (channel 54). WHNT-TV and WHDF share studios on Holmes Avenue Northwest in downtown Huntsville; WHNT-TV's transmitter is located on Monte Sano Mountain. The station also operates three news bureaus: Decatur, Sand Mountain (Albertville), and Shoals (Florence).

== History ==
=== Early history ===
WHNT began operations on Thanksgiving Day, November 28, 1963 (the first new station to be launched after President John F. Kennedy was assassinated). It has been a CBS affiliate for its entire existence, and is the only Huntsville-area station to have never changed its affiliation. The Federal Communications Commission (FCC) originally licensed the frequency for WHNT to the city of Fort Payne some 40 miles (64 km) to the southeast. The station was founded by a former employee of Birmingham station WAPI (now WVTM), Charles Grisham, now deceased, who later added two other Southern stations, WSLA in Selma, Alabama, and WYEA in Columbus, Georgia, to his portfolio.

WHNT-TV first used 16 mm film for most of its commercial and news gathering. In 1979, it switched to the 3/4-inch video tape format. WHNT used this system until 1998 when new Panasonic DVC machines and cameras were purchased.

=== New York Times ownership ===
In 1980, Grisham sold WHNT to The New York Times Company, which operated it for over a quarter century and the third station owned by their broadcasting division. WHNT's facilities were moved from Monte Sano Mountain to downtown Huntsville in 1987. The move was prompted by a fire that destroyed rival WAFF-TV (channel 48)'s studios, then on Governors Drive, five years earlier. The transmitter and tower remain on Monte Sano because the mountain provides the highest elevation in the immediate area; backup broadcast capabilities for news also remain at the Monte Sano site for use during an emergency.

WHNT is the only major station in Huntsville to operate from a facility actually constructed specifically for broadcasting purposes. WAAY-TV (channel 31) operates from a former gas station, WAFF-TV from a former jewelry store, and WZDX (channel 54) from an office building. In 2003, WHNT allowed competing stations WAAY and WZDX to use space on its tower after both stations' towers used on WAAY's property collapsed, killing three men.

=== Local TV and Tribune ownership ===
In September 2006, The New York Times Company announced that it would put its nine television stations, including WHNT, up for sale. On January 4, 2007, the company sold its television stations in a group deal to Local TV, a holding company operated by private equity group Oak Hill Capital Partners, for $530 million; the sale was finalized on May 7.

In October 2010, the station stopped using videotape. All cameras now record on digital memory cards and video playback for all newscasts comes off a digital server. WHNT's archives, the most extensive in Huntsville television, go back to 1973 and include a mix of film and videotape. The film library had been stored at the University of North Alabama in Florence, but has recently been returned to Huntsville. On July 1, 2013, the Tribune Company (which formed a management company that operated both its own television stations and those owned by Local TV in 2008) acquired the Local TV stations for $2.75 billion; the sale was completed on December 27.

=== Aborted sale to Sinclair; sale to Nexstar ===
Sinclair Broadcast Group entered into an agreement to acquire Tribune Media on May 8, 2017, for $3.9 billion, plus the assumption of $2.7 billion in Tribune debt. The deal received significant scrutiny over Sinclair's forthrightness in its applications to sell certain conflict properties, prompting the FCC to designate it for hearing and leading Tribune to terminate the deal and sue Sinclair for breach of contract.

Following the Sinclair deal's collapse, Nexstar Media Group of Irving, Texas, announced its purchase of Tribune Media on December 3, 2018, for $6.4 billion in cash and debt. As Nexstar already owned Fox affiliate WZDX and CW affiliate WHDF (channel 15), the company agreed on March 20, 2019, to divest WZDX to Tegna Inc. as part of a series of transactions with multiple companies that totaled $1.32 billion. (As WHDF does not rank among the top four in total-day viewership and therefore is not in conflict with existing FCC in-market ownership rules, it was retained by Nexstar, thus creating a new duopoly with WHNT.) The sale was completed on September 19, 2019.

== News operation ==
WHNT-TV's News 19 logo.

WHNT has been noted for live coverage of breaking news such as the shooting death of a Huntsville police officer, the 2006 Huntsville bus crash, and the solving of a thirty-year-old murder case in September 2007. Generally speaking, over the years, WHNT has always been competitive in terms of ratings with rivals WAAY and WAFF. In fact, this station is the only one among the three major network affiliates in Huntsville to have never finished in last place in the Nielsen ratings. Since Fall 2004, WHNT has used the ARMOR Doppler Weather Radar system in weather forecasting along with its own weather radar at its transmitter site.

On August 18, 2008, WHNT became the first television station in Huntsville to begin broadcasting all of its news programs in digital 16:9 widescreen. Although not truly high definition when launched, the broadcasts match the ratio of HD television screens. On April 13, 2009, starting with the weeknight 5 o'clock show, the station stopped using the NewsChannel 19 name and became WHNT News 19. Beginning on February 1, 2010, WHNT added a weeknight prime time newscast at 9 on WHNT-DT2 (referenced on-air as WHNT2). This newscast was discontinued in 2017. WHNT also previously aired an hour-long newscast at 7 a.m. on WHNT2, but discontinued it in September 2010. In November 2010, WHNT added a Sunday evening prime time newscast at 9 p.m. on WHNT2. Following the major tornado outbreak of April 27, 2011, WHNT introduced a 6:30 p.m. newscast.

On August 18, 2010, during the 10 p.m. newscast, WHNT became the first station in Huntsville to begin airing news segments in full high definition. The first segment was a sunset scene in Huntsville's Big Spring Park.

On February 2, 2011, WHNT upgraded its newscast productions to full high-definition. During the two-month transition to HD, the station's newscast originated from another part of the building while the studio was completely renovated for the first time since 1987. WHNT's newscasts are in high definition from both the studio and field like many of WHNT's Local TV stablemates. This made WHNT the first station in Huntsville to be fully HD. Also, all of the station's file video since October 2010 is in high definition.

== Technical information ==
=== Subchannels ===
The station's signal is multiplexed:

Subchannels of WHNT-TV
Subchannel	Res.	Short name	Programming
19.1	1080i	CBS-HD	CBS
19.2	720p	CW-HD	The CW (WHDF)
19.3	480i	Antenna	Antenna TV

Simulcast of subchannels of another station

Until November 25, 2008, at 5 p.m., the station programmed a 24-hour local weather channel on its second digital subchannel. It then switched to RTV, which was later replaced by a similar network, Antenna TV, in January 2011.

WHNT-TV became a charter affiliate of Antenna TV upon its launch on January 1, 2011; it is carried on digital subchannel 19.3 (as of April 25, 2016).

=== Analog-to-digital conversion ===
In May 2002, WHNT became the first station in the Huntsville market to broadcast a digital signal and begin broadcasting in high definition on UHF channel 59.

WHNT-TV shut down its analog signal, over UHF channel 19, on June 12, 2009, as part of federally mandated transition from analog to digital television. The station's digital signal relocated from its pre-transition UHF channel 59, which was among the high band UHF channels (52-69) that were removed from broadcasting use as a result of the transition, to its analog-era UHF channel 19 for post-transition operations. The station was originally going to move to channel 46 but received late permission from the FCC to move digital broadcasts to channel 19, following the closure and license cancellation earlier in the year of Florence station WYLE, which was to have broadcast on digital channel 20.
