= WIYC =

Television station in Troy, Alabama

- Troy–Montgomery, Alabama; United States
- City: Troy, Alabama
- Channels: Digital: 19 (UHF); Virtual: 48

Programming
- Affiliations: 48.1: Cozi TV; for others, see § Subchannels

Ownership
- Owner: Gray Media; (Gray Television Licensee, LLC)
- Sister stations: WSFA, WCOV-TV, WBXM-CD, WALE-LD

History
- Founded: December 18, 1986
- First air date: November 24, 2000
- Former call signs: WRJM-TV (1986–2009)
- Former channel numbers: Analog: 67 (UHF, 2000–2009); Digital: 48 (UHF, until 2020)
- Former affiliations: UPN (2000–2006); MyNetworkTV (2006–2009); TCN (2009–2011); WeatherNation TV (2011–2013)
- Call sign meaning: "It's Your Country" (former slogan; based on its previous affiliation with TCN)

Technical information
- Licensing authority: FCC
- Facility ID: 62207
- ERP: 185 kW
- HAAT: 322.3 m (1,057 ft)
- Transmitter coordinates: 32°3′36.5″N 85°57′1.8″W

Links
- Public license information: Public file; LMS

WIYC (channel 48) is a television station licensed to Troy, Alabama, United States, serving the Montgomery area as an affiliate of Cozi TV. It is owned by Gray Media alongside NBC affiliate WSFA (channel 12), Fox affiliate WCOV-TV (channel 20), Telemundo affiliate WBXM-CD (channel 15), and local weather station WALE-LD (channel 17). WIYC, WCOV-TV and WALE-LD share studios on WCOV Avenue in the Normandale section of Montgomery; WIYC's transmitter is located on County Road 37 in rural Bullock County.

== History ==
WRJM's logo as a MyNetworkTV affiliate, used from 2006 to 2009

The station came on the air on November 24, 2000, as WRJM-TV, an affiliate of the United Paramount Network (UPN). Following the announcement of the merger between UPN and The WB to form The CW, WRJM signed an affiliation agreement with News Corporation's new upstart programming service, MyNetworkTV. The station made the switch between affiliations on MyNetworkTV's first day of broadcast, September 5, 2006. In addition to MyNetworkTV programming, WRJM-TV showed traditional syndicated fare, local programming, and sports, including Troy University and high school sports.

In February 2008, the station went into receivership after defaulting on a $2.9 million loan to Citizens Bank. WRJM received an extension of time to construct its previously approved digital facilities, through November 19, 2008.

Bankruptcy receiver Walter P. Lunsford filed with the Federal Communications Commission (FCC) that the station is being offered for sale. He noted that any new owner would be responsible for construction of WRJM's digital facilities, since no construction has taken place due to the station's financial condition.

On January 16, 2009, Southern Venture Capital Group began operating WRJM via a local marketing agreement; on April 20, SVCG entered an agreement to purchase the station outright for $3 million. In August 2009 SVCG assigned the LMA and purchase agreement to Artists and Fans Network, Inc.

In April 2009, the station ceased to carry MyNetworkTV programming; at the time, the station cited satellite problems and a need to reconfigure the station's equipment for its digital transition (though the station has also since dropped all syndicated programming, in favor of The Country Network (TCN), a subchannel featuring country music videos and performances). That May, WRJM suffered a lightning strike, forcing the station to end analog transmission; the station then ordered equipment to convert to digital. It would not be until 2014 when MyNetworkTV found another affiliate, low-powered WDSF-LD, which serves the immediate Montgomery area. Since WRJM's disaffiliation, most area cable systems carried WABM from the adjacent Birmingham market.

The station changed its call letters to WIYC in November 2009.

In 2011, WIYC dropped TCN in favor of WeatherNation, a weather information network similar to The Weather Channel. It then changed affiliates again in 2013, this time affiliating with Cozi TV.

On November 15, 2017, Neal Ardman filed to sell WIYC to Woods Communications Corporation for $1 million. The sale would create a duopoly with Fox affiliate WCOV-TV (channel 20); as Montgomery does not have enough television stations to permit a legal duopoly, Woods sought a failing station waiver for the purchase. The sale was completed on April 3, 2018.

In 2020, MyNetworkTV reaffiliated with WIYC, sharing 48.2 with Decades.

=== Sales to Allen Media Group and Gray Media ===
On December 15, 2021, it was announced that Allen Media Group, a subsidiary of Los Angeles–based Entertainment Studios, would purchase WIYC, WCOV-TV and WALE-LD for $28.5 million; the sale was completed on April 14, 2023.

On June 1, 2025, amid financial woes and rising debt, Allen Media Group announced that it would explore "strategic options" for the company, such as a sale of its television stations (including WIYC, WCOV and WALE-LD). On August 8, 2025, it was announced that AMG would sell 13 of its stations, including WIYC and WCOV, to Gray Media for $171 million; in the Montgomery market, this would create a legal triopoly with NBC affiliate WSFA (channel 12). The sale was completed on May 1, 2026.

== Subchannels ==
The station's signal is multiplexed:

Subchannels of WIYC
Channel	Res.	Short name	Programming
48.1	1080i	Cozi TV	Cozi TV
48.2	1080i	Catchy	Catchy Comedy / MyNetworkTV
48.3	480i	H & I	Heroes & Icons
48.4	1080i	Mystery	Ion Mystery
48.5	480i	TBD	Roar
48.6	480i	Comet	Comet
48.7	480i	Charge	Charge!
