= Mutual Savings Life =

- Company type: Subsidiary
- Industry: Insurance
- Founded: 1927; 99 years ago
- Successor: Unitrin
- Headquarters: Decatur, Alabama
- Parent: Primesco

Mutual Savings Life provides life insurance products, annuities, and other insurance products to individuals and businesses. Founded in 1927 in Decatur, Alabama, Mutual Savings is owned by Primesco, a company founded for the purpose of acquiring Mutual Savings.

In April 2008, Primesco was acquired by Unitrin.

In August 2011, Unitrin Inc. changed its name to Kemper Corp.

== See also ==
- Life insurance
