= WAFF (TV) =

Television station in Huntsville, Alabama

- Huntsville–Decatur, Alabama; United States
- City: Huntsville, Alabama
- Channels: Digital: 15 (UHF); Virtual: 48
- Branding: WAFF 48; 48 News

Programming
- Affiliations: 48.1: NBC; for others, see § Subchannels

Ownership
- Owner: Gray Media; (Gray Television Licensee, LLC)
- Sister stations: WAAY-TV; WTHV-LD

History
- First air date: July 4, 1954
- Former call signs: WMSL-TV (1954–1975); WYUR-TV (1975–1978)
- Former channel numbers: Analog: 23 (UHF, 1954–1968), 48 (UHF, 1968–2009); Digital: 49 (UHF, 2000–2009), 48 (UHF, 2009–2020)
- Former affiliations: NBC (1954–1967); DuMont (secondary, 1954–1955); ABC (secondary, 1954–1959); CBS (secondary, 1954–1963); NTA (secondary, 1956–1961); ABC (1967–1977)
- Call sign meaning: "American Families Finest", the one-time slogan of former owner Aflac

Technical information
- Licensing authority: FCC
- Facility ID: 591
- ERP: 137 kW
- HAAT: 576 m (1,890 ft)
- Transmitter coordinates: 34°42′39.3″N 86°32′7″W

Links
- Public license information: Public file; LMS
- Website: www.waff.com

WAFF (channel 48) is a television station in Huntsville, Alabama, United States, affiliated with NBC. It is owned by Gray Media alongside ABC affiliate WAAY-TV (channel 31) and low-power Telemundo affiliate WTHV-LD (channel 29). The three stations share studios on Memorial Parkway (US 431) in Huntsville; WAFF's transmitter is located south of Monte Sano State Park.

== History ==
=== The Decatur years (1954–1969) ===
WAFF is northern Alabama's oldest television station. The station first began broadcasting from studios and transmitters in Decatur (30 miles (48 km) west of Huntsville) on July 4, 1954, as WMSL-TV, channel 23. It was owned by Frank Whisenant, a Decatur businessman whose company, Tennessee Valley Radio & Television Corporation, also owned WMSL radio (AM 1400, now WWTM). Both stations took their calls from Mutual Savings Life Insurance Company, who founded WMSL radio in 1935.

WMSL-TV originally carried programming from all four networks of the time—NBC, CBS, ABC and the DuMont Network—but was a primary NBC affiliate. It lost the DuMont Network when that one began closing down in 1955; it lost ABC when WAAY-TV started in Huntsville in 1959 as an ABC affiliate; and, finally, lost CBS when WHNT-TV began transmitting as a CBS affiliate in 1963.

During the late 1950s, WMSL was also affiliated briefly with the NTA Film Network.

Until the early 1960s, Decatur was the largest city in the viewing area, and it was centrally located—thus making it a good location for the region's first TV station. However, when Huntsville became the region's largest city due to the exponential growth of U.S. Army Missile Command and NASA installations, Whisenant decided to move WMSL-TV there as well; it was the only major station in the market licensed in Decatur. Whisenant applied to change WMSL-TV's city of license to Huntsville as well, even though the Federal Communications Commission (FCC) had changed its regulations so it could have kept its license in Decatur. However, because the station's original channel assignment, channel 23, was too close in frequency to the area's Alabama Educational Television outlet, WHIQ (channel 25), the FCC required WMSL-TV to move to channel 48 as a condition on its permit to relocate its city of license. The move to a higher UHF frequency was highly unusual for that time, especially during the 1960s, when the All-Channel Receiver Act had only recently been passed. Many UHF stations that had started operations on channels above 40 or so were able to move to lower allocations per FCC action, or even to VHF.

WMSL-TV began broadcasting on channel 48 on January 7, 1969, while simulcasting on channel 23 for a week. A few months later, Whisenant closed the station's studios in Decatur when the new studios opened in Huntsville. In the meantime, Whisenant sold WMSL radio to Clete Quick, another Decatur businessman.

=== Early years in Huntsville (1969–1974) ===
On September 1, 1967, about 16 months before moving to Huntsville, WMSL-TV had to begin sharing the NBC affiliation for North Alabama with WAAY-TV (meaning the market had no local ABC affiliate for a year; the network was available only on out-of-market stations in Birmingham, Nashville, and Chattanooga that were carried by area cable systems). Still, the new channel 48, which took over WAAY-TV's old ABC affiliation when its NBC contract expired in September 1968, made persistent efforts to serve its greatly expanded viewing area, which now included most of the Shoals region of northwestern Alabama.

=== Call sign and ownership changes ===
In October 1974, Whisenant sold the station to Vermont-based International Television Corporation, which renamed the station WYUR-TV on March 9, 1975. Despite more aggressive attempts to promote its newscast, WYUR's ratings were far behind WAAY and WHNT. Then, on June 6, 1978, Aflac, then known by its full name of American Family Life Assurance Company, bought the station, re-christening it WAFF after its slogan of the time, "American Families Finest". Some months earlier, on December 11, 1977, WAAY decided to return to ABC, as that network had become the nation's most popular, in prime time programming especially; in turn, this left channel 48 returning with the then-less-desirable NBC affiliation. Aflac did not immediately turn the corner with WAFF; the station kept fine-tuning its newscasts and acquiring some nationally popular syndicated programs, but very little seemed to work.

Still, the station pressed forward; around 1980 or 1981 a new tower was constructed on the south end of Monte Sano, adjacent to the station's studios. The tower measured some 1,476 feet (450 m) in height and was constructed in an effort to provide better reception to viewers across northern Alabama and southern middle Tennessee. The weather forecaster at the time, Glenn Bracken, held a coloring contest for schoolchildren across the viewing area, whereby they could depict their scenes of the new "tall tower" and incorporate WAFF's marketing message "New Tall Tower Means More Picture Power" and have their drawing and name presented during the nightly weather forecast (which usually took place on a balcony outside the news studio's doors). Also, during this period, WAFF began airing promotional spots showing various scenes of its news personalities interacting with residents of its viewing area, along with its news helicopter, "Sky48", to a song titled "We're Your Kind of People".

=== 1982 studio fire and aftermath ===
On the evening of March 24, 1982, the station's building, situated on Monte Sano to overlook Huntsville proper, caught fire and burned. Local firefighters found the fire hydrant at the end of the driveway had yet to be connected to the water main and the water pressure of nearby hydrants were low; this situation would later prompt competitor WHNT to relocate to downtown Huntsville, some years later. It was a few days when WAFF began broadcasting through the auspices of local cable companies, who provided NBC programming feeds from WSMV-TV in Nashville (which later became a sister station of WAFF) and WVTM-TV in Birmingham, both of which were available in their own rights on many northern Alabama cable systems prior to 1990. Eventually, WAFF would rebuild at a new location, occupying a former jewelry store on North Memorial Parkway, some miles away from Monte Sano; microwave links connected the studios to the transmitter and tower. The fire would also prompt Huntsville city officials to repair the water pressure situation and build a new fire station atop Monte Sano, which sits directly across from WAAY's studios.

=== Recent history (1980s–present) ===
Logo used from 1996 to January 2014

The disaster may have proved to be a blessing in disguise, as Aflac began investing money in developing talent and production facilities, enabling WAFF to start making a serious ratings impact for the first time since the early 1970s. Not only did the station benefit from the renewed popularity of NBC in the mid-1980s, but its acquisitions of highly popular syndicated shows like The Oprah Winfrey Show, Jeopardy!, and Wheel of Fortune made it a hit with viewers in the Tennessee Valley region. Since that time, the station has experienced continued success.

Aflac sold WAFF, along with its other broadcasting properties, to Raycom Media of Montgomery, Alabama in 1996, making it a soon-to-be sister station to Montgomery's WSFA, which became the flagship of the said company in the next decade.

=== Sale to Gray Television ===
On June 25, 2018, Atlanta-based Gray Television announced it had reached an agreement with Raycom to merge their respective broadcasting assets (consisting of Raycom's 63 existing owned-and/or-operated television stations, including WAFF), and Gray's 93 television stations) under Gray's corporate umbrella. The cash-and-stock merger transaction valued at $3.6 billion—in which Gray shareholders would acquire preferred stock currently held by Raycom—resulted in WAFF gaining a new sister station in an adjacent market, including CBS affiliate WVLT-TV in Knoxville, Tennessee as well as its sister station WBXX-TV (while separating it from WTNZ). The sale was approved on December 20, and was completed on January 2, 2019. WAFF gained a new sister station in the market when Gray acquired WAAY-TV on May 1, 2026.

== Programming ==
Perhaps the most popular of WMSL's local programs was the weekday children's show hosted by station general manager Benny Carle, a Birmingham native who honed his talents for many years on WBRC-TV there. The show was typical for its day, featuring about 10 to 15 school-aged children in the studio with the host, who conducted party games, told stories, and engaged in clownish behavior; cartoons were shown during the one-hour (later 30-minute) late-afternoon (later mid-morning) program. He began the show in the mid-1960s, while the station was still in Decatur, and continued it until 1975, when ABC's Good Morning America took over its morning time slot. Carle owned radio station WBCF and low-power TV station WBCF-LP in Florence, Alabama, which he established after leaving channel 48. Carle died on October 2, 2014, at the age of 89. Another notable program during that period was a Saturday-afternoon teenage dance show, which ran after the similar American Bandstand (although the local show more closely resembled Soul Train), that holds the honor of being the first television program exclusively aimed at northern Alabama's African-American population. The program was hosted by Nat Tate, who until his 2007 death worked for radio stations in the Decatur area and served as a Baptist minister.

WAFF made a controversial decision in the mid-1980s to preempt Late Night with David Letterman (and on Fridays, Friday Night Videos) in favor of evangelist Jimmy Swaggart's daily half-hour program at 11:30 p.m. for several years, largely to cater to the area's conservative religious population and in the likelihood that it would bring in more money than local ad revenues would for Letterman's show. The station opted to sign off at midnight rather than tape delay the NBC shows for later airing. Also, WAFF made the decision to run the Swaggart program at a time when many area residents did not have access to religious programming on cable television, as would be the case in later years. However, Letterman and FNV were eventually picked up by ABC affiliate (and former full-time NBC outlet) WAAY (airing after Nightline) and aired there until Swaggart's sexual scandal in 1988 impacted his ministry to the point that he had to cancel the daily program. Thereafter, WAFF returned both Letterman and FNV to their regular timeslots and continues to this day to air NBC's entire late-night schedule without preemptions. WAAY also cleared several NBC daytime shows, between 9 and 10 a.m. Central Time before ABC's daytime programming began for the day, that WAFF passed on during this period as well.

== News operation ==
At 4:30 a.m. on October 25, 2010, WAFF began broadcasting its news programming in high definition, making it the first station in the Huntsville television market to do so. However, while the station's studio shots are in high definition, much of WAFF's field video has remained in widescreen standard definition even after rival WHNT-TV upgraded to full high-definition newscasts in February 2011.

As with the other two major-network Huntsville stations, weather forecasting became a very high priority for WAFF in the 1990s, especially after the city experienced a devastating tornado in November 1989. The station constructed a Doppler radar and began to use highly sophisticated meteorological equipment.

WAFF's "First Alert Doppler Radar" (formerly "Live Stormtracker Doppler"), which was located in Limestone County just off of US 72, was destroyed when it was hit by a large and violent tornado (which produced EF5 damage in nearby Tanner, approximately 10 miles (16 km) away from the radar site) on April 27, 2011. A camera mounted on the tower showed the tornado approaching the radar moments before it struck; aerial footage taken after the tornado showed that the radar's tower remained standing despite being in the tornado's damage path. However, the large ball on top containing the radar equipment was destroyed and never found. In March 2012, WAFF installed a 1 million watt C-Band doppler radar system supplied by Huntsville-based Baron Services to replace the previously destroyed radar terminal. That company was formed by former WAFF meteorologist (who also worked for WAAY previously) Bob Baron.

On August 3, 2026, WAAY's news and weather apps were discontinued and merged into the apps of WAFF. On August 6, WAFF chief meteorologist Brad Travis revealed that WAAY would begin to simulcast WAFF's newscasts on August 13, officially merging the two news operations.

=== Raycom News Network and Raycom Weather Network ===
WAFF is part of the Raycom News Network, a system designed to rapidly share information among a group of four Raycom-owned stations and websites serving the state of Alabama. A regional network has developed among Columbus–Phenix City's WTVM, Montgomery's WSFA, and Birmingham's WBRC in which stations share information, equipment such as satellite trucks or even reporters' stories. Between them, these four stations cover the state of Alabama. The four stations also comprise the Raycom Weather Network and the Raycom Alabama Weather Blog, where meteorologists from all four stations post forecasts and storm reports, as well as live feeds from all of the cameras that the four stations operate. The site also has live feeds of the radars of WTVM, WSFA, WBRC and WAFF. The only ex-Raycom station in Alabama (which is no longer a sister station of WAFF) not participating in the arrangement is WDFX-TV in the Dothan area, which formerly received its news programming from WSFA.

== In popular culture ==
WAFF received national media attention on July 29, 2010, when a report aired on July 28 became a viral video known as the "Bed Intruder Song". The video features the reaction of Antoine Dodson in response to a rape attempt on his sister, Kelly Dodson.

== Technical information ==
=== Subchannels ===
The station's signal is multiplexed:

Subchannels of WAFF
Subchannel	Res.	Short name	Programming
48.1	1080i	WAFF	NBC
48.2	480i	Bounce	Bounce TV
48.3	720p	WAFFTSN	Tennessee Valley SEN
48.4	480i	LAFF	Laff
48.5	480i	Grit	Grit
48.6	480i	IONPLUS	Ion Plus
48.7	480i	365BLK	365BLK

=== Analog-to-digital conversion ===
WAFF shut down its analog signal, over UHF channel 48, on June 12, 2009, as part of the federally mandated transition from analog to digital television. It, according to an FCC filing, was to relocate to channel 48 and increase power. The station's digital signal relocated from its pre-transition UHF channel 49 to channel 48; there also was an increase in transmitter height in December 2011. The accompanying planned increase in transmitter power, however, was considerably reduced. This resulted in the station broadcasting at 48 kW ERP instead of the originally planned 356 kW ERP.
