= WSFA =

Television station in Montgomery, Alabama

- Montgomery, Alabama; United States
- Channels: Digital: 8 (VHF); Virtual: 12
- Branding: WSFA 12; Bounce Central Alabama (12.2)

Programming
- Affiliations: 12.1: NBC; for others, see § Subchannels

Ownership
- Owner: Gray Media; (Gray Television Licensee, LLC)
- Sister stations: WCOV-TV, WIYC, WALE-LD, WBXM-CD

History
- First air date: December 25, 1954
- Former call signs: WSFA-TV (1954–1986)
- Former channel numbers: Analog: 12 (VHF, 1954–2009); Digital: 14 (UHF, 2000–2009), 12 (VHF, 2009–2020)
- Former affiliations: ABC (secondary, 1954–1960)
- Call sign meaning: "We're the South's Finest Airport" derived from former sister station WSFA radio (later WLWI)

Technical information
- Licensing authority: FCC
- Facility ID: 13993
- ERP: 32.1 kW
- HAAT: 575 m (1,886 ft)
- Transmitter coordinates: 31°58′29″N 86°9′44″W

Links
- Public license information: Public file; LMS
- Website: www.wsfa.com

WSFA (channel 12) is a television station in Montgomery, Alabama, United States, affiliated with NBC. It is owned by Gray Media alongside Fox affiliate WCOV-TV (channel 20), Cozi TV affiliate WIYC (channel 48), Telemundo affiliate WBXM-CD (channel 15), and local weather station WALE-LD (channel 17). WSFA and WBXM-CD share studios on Dexter Avenue in downtown Montgomery; WSFA's transmitter is located in Grady along the Montgomery–Pike county line.

WSFA was one of two flagship television properties (alongside CBS affiliate WBTV in Charlotte, North Carolina) of previous owner Raycom Media, which had headquarters downtown at the RSA Tower. The station boasts one of the largest coverage areas in Alabama, providing at least secondary coverage from the geographical center of the state to the Florida state line and from the Black Belt region to the Chattahoochee River bordering Georgia.

WSFA was formerly the default NBC affiliate for Dothan and the Wiregrass Region, which had been one of the few areas without an NBC station of its own. That status ended when WTVY in Dothan, which would eventually become a sister station of WSFA, launched WRGX-LD as an NBC affiliate on June 1, 2013.

== History ==
The station's call letters—SFA—are an acronym for "South's Finest Airport". They can be traced back to 1930, when Gordon Persons (years before becoming Governor of Alabama) opened a radio station at the Montgomery Regional Airport (now Gunter Annex of Maxwell Air Force Base). The new station was Alabama's fourth station but the first in Montgomery. WSFA radio quickly became a landmark in Montgomery and was most famous in its early days for launching the career of country music legend Hank Williams, a native of nearby Georgiana, in the 1940s.

By the mid-1950s, the new medium of television was sweeping the nation and Persons won the construction permit for Montgomery's second television station on VHF channel 12. This allocation was supposed to be occupied by Montgomery's first television station, CBS affiliate WCOV-TV (it is now a Fox affiliate). However, due to a delay in getting a transmitter for channel 12, WCOV was forced to move to UHF channel 20. Persons built a state-of-the-art facility on Delano Avenue to house both the television and radio stations in 1954, and WSFA-TV aired its first broadcast on December 25, 1954—a Christmas present to Alabama. Owing to WSFA radio's long affiliation with the NBC Radio Network, channel 12 has been Montgomery's NBC affiliate for its entire existence.

Only two months later, in February 1955, Persons sold WSFA-AM-TV to the Gaylord family's Oklahoma Publishing Company, earning a handsome return on his original investment of a quarter-century earlier. At that time, WSFA-AM-TV was operated by a staff of 35. In 1956, the radio station was sold and moved to downtown Montgomery under a new set of call letters, WHHY (and then later still, WLWI).

The television station was sold again, in 1959, to the Broadcasting Company of the South of Columbia, South Carolina. A subsidiary of the Liberty Life Insurance Company, the company renamed itself Cosmos Broadcasting Corporation in 1965. Later in the decade, Liberty reorganized itself as Liberty Corporation with Cosmos and Liberty Life as its subsidiaries.

WSFA was the area's only VHF station until 1985, when Selma-based WAKA (channel 8) built a new transmitter that was halfway between Selma and Montgomery, thus giving it good coverage in Montgomery proper (but is still licensed to Selma to this day) and replaced WCOV as the area's CBS affiliate. In 1986, it dropped the "-TV" suffix, though as mentioned above channel 12 and its radio sister had gone their separate ways three decades earlier. Liberty exited the insurance business in 2002, bringing the station directly under the Liberty banner. The company merged with Raycom Media in 2006. Since Raycom was headquartered in Montgomery, WSFA became the corporation's flagship station. However, with Raycom's 2008 purchase of Lincoln Financial Media's television stations, WSFA shared flagship status with Charlotte's WBTV.

On June 25, 2018, Atlanta-based Gray Television announced it had reached an agreement to merge with Raycom Media in $3.6 billion transaction. The sale was approved on December 20, 2018, and was completed on January 2, 2019.

On September 17, 2024, Gray and the New Orleans Pelicans announced a broader deal to form the Gulf Coast Sports & Entertainment Network, which will broadcast nearly all 2024–25 Pelicans games on Gray's stations in the Gulf South, including WSFA.

WSFA gained two new sister stations in the market when Gray Media acquired WCOV-TV and Cozi TV affiliate WIYC (channel 48) on May 1, 2026, creating a legal triopoly with WSFA.

== News operation ==
Local programming includes WSFA's major commitment—regional and local news—with shows such as Alabama Live, WSFA 12 News First at 4, WSFA 12 News at 6, and WSFA 12 News at 10.

As Montgomery's only VHF station for 31 years, WSFA has been a leading source of local news in the market since rating records have been kept. The station airs a significant amount of news programming despite Montgomery's small market size (it is currently the 121st market nationally). As of 2026, WSFA airs over thirty hours of local newscasts per week, far and away the most of any station in the market.

News programming is also on the subchannel during the time that its primary channel is airing network programming.

Not long after the Gaylord family bought the station in 1955, they dispatched Frank McGee, top anchorman at company flagship WKY-TV (now KFOR-TV) in Oklahoma City, to Montgomery as News Director. Under McGee, WSFA gained a national reputation for its coverage (fed periodically to the network) of local events in the Civil Rights Movement such as the Montgomery bus boycott of 1955 involving Rosa Parks and the varied activities of Martin Luther King Jr. during his pastorate at Dexter Avenue Baptist Church. McGee eventually joined NBC News as a correspondent and hosted Today from 1971 until his death in 1974. By the time Liberty bought WSFA in 1959, it had developed an image as a news-intensive station. Wanting to repeat WSFA's success, Liberty began developing strong news departments at its other stations as well.

On January 15, 2007, it added an entertainment/lifestyle magazine-type program known as Alabama Live. Airing weekday mornings at 11, the show reflects on its slogan of "Coverage. Community. Commitment." because it incorporates special features and guest interviews usually not conducted in traditional newscasts. WSFA established a news share agreement with Fox affiliate WCOV (owned by the Woods Communications Corporation) on January 7, 2008. This resulted in a 35-minute newscast being added on that station, weeknights at 9. It was known as Fox News at 9 because the broadcast was simulcasted on then-WSFA sister station and fellow Fox affiliate WDFX-TV in Dothan. A weekend half-hour edition began in summer 2008.

On August 3, 2008, WSFA upgraded its newscasts to high definition level, becoming the first station in Montgomery to do so. The news set and graphics were redesigned in the transition. Initially, the 9 p.m. shows were not included because they originated from an older, secondary set at WSFA's studios. However, in spring 2010, those broadcasts began airing in HD with updated graphics separate from programs seen on WSFA. Since WDFX and WCOV both aired Fox News at 9, there was regional coverage provided by reporters based at WDFX's studios (referred to on-air as the Wiregrass Newsroom). After WCOV's contract with WSFA expired at the end of 2010, that station entered into a new agreement with CBS affiliate WAKA to produce a nightly prime time newscast at 9 covering Montgomery. On January 1, 2011, WSFA transitioned its prime time show, renamed The News at 9, to its RTV digital subchannel. The format is mostly unchanged except for originating from WSFA's primary set. It continued to be simulcast on WDFX until 2020.

== Technical information ==
=== Subchannels ===
The station's signal is multiplexed:

Subchannels of WSFA
Subchannel	Res.	Short name	Programming
12.1	1080i	WSFA	NBC
12.2	480i	Bounce	Bounce TV
12.3	480i	GCSEN	Gulf Coast Sports & Entertainment Network
12.4	480i	Grit	Grit
12.5	480i	The365	365BLK
12.6	480i	Oxygen	Oxygen

WSFA-DT2 had been part of the NBC Weather Plus but reverted to a local weather channel after the national service was discontinued on December 31, 2008. In February 2010, Retro Television Network (RTV) moved from WSFA-DT3 to WSFA-DT2, combined with weather updates and other shows. On September 26, 2011, WSFA replaced RTV with Bounce TV, as part of Raycom's affiliation deal with that network. WSFA-DT2 also includes repeats of newscasts from the main channel, live local weather updates, syndicated programming, and broadcasts from Raycom Sports.

The third digital subchannel, WSFA-DT3, currently broadcasts the Gulf Coast Sports & Entertainment Network. WSFA-DT3 had originally aired The Tube Music Network until its shuttering on October 1, 2007. RTV then took its place. WSFA-DT3 was shut down on December 31, 2009, in order to start beta testing of applications that would transmit its signal to mobile devices, but was then re-opened in October 2014 carrying Grit TV. On January 1, 2020, WSFA-DT3 replaced Grit with Circle.

=== Analog to digital conversion ===
WSFA shut down its analog signal, over VHF channel 12, on June 12, 2009, the official date on which full-power television stations in the United States transitioned from analog to digital broadcasts under federal mandate. The station's digital signal relocated from its pre-transition UHF channel 14 to VHF channel 12.
