= Volumetric Imaging and Processing of Integrated Radar =

Doppler weather radar software

Volumetric Imaging and Processing of Integrated Radar, known by the acronym VIPIR, is an analysis and display program for Doppler weather radar, created and sold by Baron Services. This software allows improved analysis of radar data for private users, in particular television stations, similar to the Weather Decision Support System program used by the National Weather Service.

== Technique ==
WSR-88D, or NEXRAD, Doppler weather radars scan at various elevations, creating a volume scan. This data can be manipulated in a three-dimensional view by VIPIR. The result of this process is a three-dimensional image of the storm, which may be rotated and viewed from any angle. If imagery is zoomed in at an adequate range, actual weather satellite data can be superimposed.

VIPIR images can be constructed from multiple sources, including Doppler weather radar and NEXRAD. It is used by television meteorologists to give a comprehensive view of weather, in particular severe weather events.

== Algorithms ==
Included in VIPIR are algorithms that analyze precipitation data in order to find signatures of severe thunderstorms, accumulation of rain or snow, and other weather patterns of interest.

=== Storm tracking ===
VIPIR automatically locates thunderstorms over the radar coverage area using algorithms analyzing the water content of each storm, its motion and wind fields. Storms are classified according to certain criteria and ranked. The ones capable of producing a tornado are flagged by red or yellow cylinders according to the strength of the vortex as defined by the tornado vortex signature criteria similar to those the National Weather Service uses. To do this, it uses the presence of a BWER in reflectivity and atmospheric rotation picked up by Doppler weather radar.

=== Accumulations ===
VIPIR tracks snowfall/rainfall accumulations. It has an extrapolation feature to predict snowfall totals in excess of 24 hours in advance using meteorological computer model outputs. The algorithm, called Snow Machine, forecasts several precipitation types: rain, sleet and wintry mix.

=== Baron Tornado Index ===
The BTI, a product that was recently introduced, is mainly used to determine the probability of the presence of a tornado or tornadoes inside a tornadic vortex signature on the rear flank of the storm, to better alert potential high risk areas for tornadoes and to easily track them. With the help of radar data, mesoscale models and algorithms, it is measured on a scale of 0 to 10. The higher the BTI value is, the more likely a tornado is on the ground. Shear markers from different colors are used with BTI values above 2. Yellow markers are used for values between 2 and 3.9, Orange markers are used for values between 4 and 6.9 and red markers are used for values over 7.

== See also ==
- NEXRAD
- Weather radar
