= WBCF (AM) =

- Florence, Alabama; United States
- Broadcast area: Florence-Muscle Shoals
- Frequency: 1240 kHz
- Branding: NewsTalk 1240

Programming
- Format: News/talk
- Affiliations: Bloomberg Radio; Fox News Radio; CBS News Radio; NBC News Radio; Compass Media Networks; Premiere Networks; Westwood One

Ownership
- Owner: Benny Carle Broadcasting, Inc.

History
- First air date: 1946
- Last air date: 2024
- Former call signs: WMFT (1946–1952); WOWL (1952–1977)

Technical information
- Licensing authority: FCC
- Facility ID: 4769
- Class: C
- Power: 1,000 watts unlimited
- Transmitter coordinates: 34°47′01″N 87°42′15″W
- Translator: 97.1 W246BS (Florence)

Links
- Public license information: Public file; LMS
- Webcast: Listen live
- Website: www.wbcf.com

WBCF (1240 kHz, "NewsTalk 1240") was an AM radio station broadcasting a news/talk format. Licensed to serve the community of Florence, Alabama, the station broadcast to the Florence-Muscle Shoals Metropolitan Area. The station was owned by Benny Carle Broadcasting, Inc.

== History ==
WBCF went on the air in 1946 as WMFT. The original owners of the station sold WMFT in August 1952 to Richard C. Biddle, who changed the call sign to WOWL. Biddle launched Florence's first television station, WOWL-TV on channel 15 (now WHDF), in 1957.

Biddle sold WOWL (AM) in 1973 to newspaper publisher Richard Hammel, who was allowed to retain the WOWL call letters for the radio station despite it now being operated separately from WOWL-TV. Hammel then unloaded the station in 1977 to local advertising executive and former broadcaster Benny Carle, who changed the call letters to WBCF. Carle was, from the 1950s through the 1970s, a children's show host on Birmingham and Huntsville television stations, the latter of which (the present WAFF-TV) he was a minority owner.

In its later years, WBCF featured programming from Westwood One, CBS News Radio, and Fox News Radio.

The Federal Communications Commission cancelled the station’s license on January 2, 2025.
