= 2006 Huntsville bus crash =

School bus crash in Huntsville, Alabama, United States

Coordinates: 34.73715°N 86.59298°W

Huntsville bus crash

Details
- Date: November 20, 2006
- Location: Huntsville, Alabama
- Country: United States
- Line: School bus
- Operator: Laidlaw Transit
- Owner: Laidlaw Transit
- Incident type: Fall from bridge

Statistics
- Bus: School Bus
- Vehicles: Toyota Celica
- Passengers: 41(1 in Celica)
- Deaths: 4
- Injured: 33
- 5 people were uninjured, 3 on the school bus, and 2 in the Celica.

The Huntsville bus crash involved a school bus carrying 40 students from Lee High School and a car, both heading to the Huntsville Center for Technology, which occurred on November 20, 2006, on an elevated portion of Interstate 565 in Huntsville, Alabama.

== Incident ==
On November 20, 2006, around 10 a.m., an International school bus carrying 40 students from Lee High School to the Huntsville Center for Technology was traveling in the left lane on the elevated two-lane I-565. A 1990 Toyota Celica driven by another Lee High student merged from the left lane to the right and accelerated to pass the bus, but his vehicle began to fishtail and became impossible to control. A student on the bus stated that he saw the car attempted to overtake the bus and lose control, but closed his eyes and grabbed his seat after the collision.

Police said that the bus went over the side of the road after a car driven by another Lee High student tried to swerve around the bus, causing the bus driver to swerve going over the edge of the elevated roadway. The driver was ejected from the bus before it went over the side of the bridge, as he was not wearing a seat belt. The bus hit the 32-inch-high cement bridge rail and rode the top of the rail for 117 feet before it plunged over the side. The NTSB report for the crash stated that the bus had nose-dived into the ground before coming to a stop.

In later interviews students said that many grabbed for other students to help them brace and keep them from falling forward to varying degrees of success. A student recounted that some students were able to evacuate the bus on their own via the emergency door in the back and ceiling of the vehicle. Some students also reportedly tried to enter back into the bus to help students pinned between the seats.

Four students were killed and 33 were injured after the bus plunged almost 40 feet (12 m). Of the four, all were female students who ranged in age from 16 to 19 years old.

== Investigation ==
The initial investigation indicated that the secondary car that had attempted to overtake the bus had veered into the bus's lane, causing it to scrape along the concrete barrier. The teenage driver of the second car claimed that a part of the vehicle had malfunctioned and caused the car to drift into the other lane. Investigators raised potential theories that the car might have had a malfunction in the steering system. A criminal investigation into the crash was closed without charges after toxicology reports for both the bus and car drivers were found to be negative for controlled substances or alcohol.

An investigation into the crash was opened by the NTSB and later closed after three years of study. The investigation concluded that the driver had lost control of the vehicle during a "passing manevour" around a curve, during the same time that the driver of a Toyota Celica attempted to overtake the bus prior to an upcoming exit.

== Legal fallout ==
The families of the four teenagers killed in the crash filed lawsuits shortly after the incident. The suits named Laidlaw Transit, Anthony Scott, the school bus driver and the driver of the Toyota Celica as defendants, and each suit was settled in 2008. Additional lawsuits were filed by families of about two dozen students who were injured and settled after the first four suits.

== Aftermath ==
The crash was extensively covered by CNN and USA Today. A photograph of James "Rusty" Edward Moore Jr. sitting next to his girlfriend who was covered by a blanket went viral, as many thought Moore Jr was sitting next to a dead body. The girlfriend, however, was just resting and cold.

The crash reignited debate over the installation of seat belts in buses, and whether Alabama should follow the lead of states such as Florida in legislating compulsory lap belts. Following the crash Alabama Governor Bob Riley ordered a report be made into the issue. A study group consisting of education and transport officials interviewed 17 expert witnesses, and in early 2007 released recommendations that a pilot program be run with lap and shoulder belts being installed in a limited number of new buses from 2008.

A similar crash occurred on November 21, 2016, in Chattanooga, Tennessee, where a school bus driver lost control of a bus causing it to roll over on its side and crash into a tree, killing six students and injuring 23.
