= 2016 Chattanooga school bus crash =

School bus crash in Chattanooga, Tennessee, United States

Coordinates: 35°01′27″N 85°14′05″W

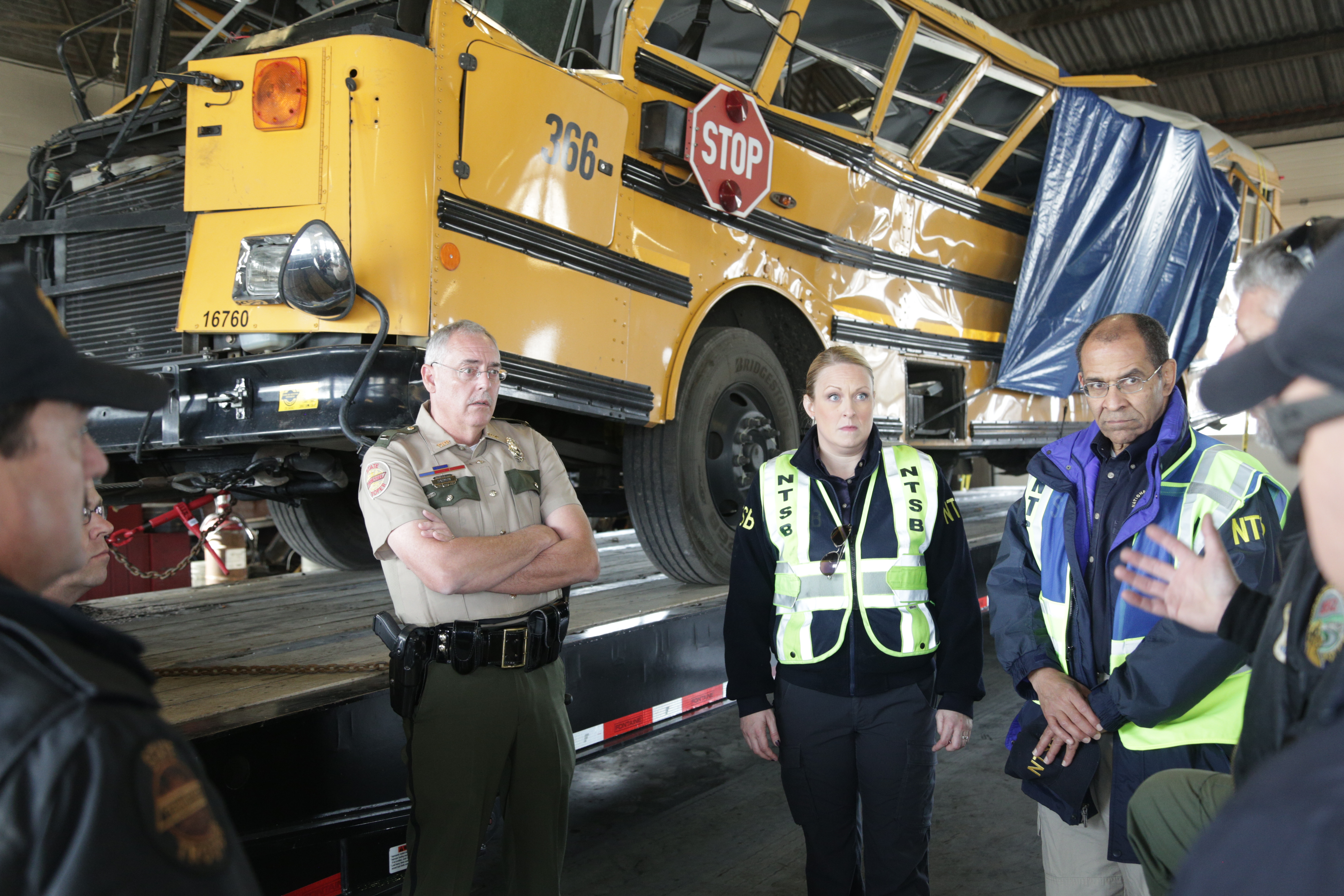
- NTSB investigators and the damaged bus

Details
- Date: November 21, 2016
- Location: Chattanooga, Tennessee
- Incident type: School bus crash
- Cause: Excessive speed.

Statistics
- Bus: School bus
- Passengers: 37
- Deaths: 6 (1 later)
- Injured: 32, incl. the bus driver (6 critical)

On the afternoon of November 21, 2016, a school bus in Chattanooga, Tennessee, United States, rolled over onto its passenger side and became wrapped around a tree. There were six fatalities and 23 injuries.

== Incident ==
The incident took place in the city's Brainerd neighborhood on Talley Road, which officials described as a "narrow, winding road." The bus, operated by Durham School Services, was transporting children from Woodmore Elementary School. Cameras mounted inside the bus captured the crash and the events before it.

The driver, 24-year-old Johnthony K. Walker, lost control of the bus and caused it to strike a pole and then a tree and flip over. According to court records, he lost control of the bus and swerved off of the roadway to the right, striking an elevated driveway and mailbox, before swerving to the left and overturning, striking a telephone pole and a tree.

Authorities received a call about the crash just before 3:30 p.m. and first responders worked the scene for many hours to remove all of the victims from the bus. The rescue effort took more than two hours, even though the last child was removed from the bus around 4:30 p.m.

There were 37 children on the bus at the time of the crash.

== Victims ==
Five of the children died at the scene of the crash. A sixth child died two days later. Of the deceased, three were fourth-graders, one a third-grader, one a first-grader, and one a kindergartner, none of whom were older than 10.

Thirty-two children were injured in the crash. Of them, nine were treated directly for minor injuries. Of the nine children treated directly, three escaped for safety with minor injuries. Twenty-three children were hospitalized, six of whom were in critical condition. The driver of the bus was not seriously injured, but along with the children was also taken to the hospital, where he was arraigned. Walker was the only victim to be charged in connection with the collision.

Identification of the victims was hampered by many of the children being too young to know their parents names or phone numbers; many referred to their parents with informal names such as "Mama", and did not know their names, spellings, or birth dates. The children also did not have any form of identification with them when they arrived at the hospital and all were wearing school uniforms when they were admitted. Photographs provided by parents in the waiting room, or taken of the child and shown to teachers were used to identify the students admitted into the hospital.

== Aftermath ==
Support was seen throughout the community and in other states. The NFL Tennessee Titans donated $25,000 to the Woodmore Fund, which benefits the families affected by the crash and wore "W.E.S" decals on their helmets in their game against the Chicago Bears in tribute to the students. Lines were seen at Blood Assurance in Chattanooga, with staff fast tracking donors with blood type O negative and had extended their hours at three locations to better serve donors. Donations of teddy bears, money and pizzas to the Children's Hospital at Erlanger were also seen.

Governor Bill Haslam issued a statement that night offering his thoughts and prayers to the families involved as did David W. Purkey with the Tennessee Department of Safety and Homeland Security.

== Investigation ==
Officials believe that the speed of the bus might have been a contributing factor. On the day after the crash, a spokesman for the Chattanooga police department reported that drugs and alcohol were not factors. According to CBS News correspondent Mark Strassmann, the mother of three children on the bus, including one who died, stated that her surviving children told her that Walker asked if they were "ready to die" immediately before the crash. Chattanooga police disputed the accuracy of this claim.

Chattanooga Officers testified during the 2016 hearing that the school bus traveled between 48 and 52 mph, in a 30 mph zone. Students had previously complained about Walker's quality of driving and the private company that he was employed under, Durham School Services, had a history of traffic accidents in Tennessee.

== Driver ==
Johnthony K. Walker, aged 24, was identified as the driver of the school bus and had been issued his commercial driver's license (CDL) in April, 2016. He was in a previous crash in September 2016 when he drove around a blind curve in a residential area and failed to yield to a right of way and sideswiped another vehicle. There were no injuries reported.

Walker was arrested with minor injuries and later charged with six counts of vehicular homicide, reckless endangerment, and reckless driving. On March 1, 2018, Walker was convicted of six counts of criminally negligent homicide, 11 counts of reckless aggravated assault, seven counts of assault, reckless endangerment, reckless driving and using his phone. In addition a Hamilton County Criminal Court jury convicted Walker of lesser charges for the crash. He was sentenced to four years in prison, but went free on bail pending an appeal.

In June 2018, while free on bail pending an appeal of the bus crash charges, Walker was arrested for the statutory rape of a 14-year-old girl at a family member's Nashville home where he was staying. Officers stated during testimony that Walker admitted to having sex with the minor in the home's family room five times and that he believed it to be a consensual relationship but it was "repulsive" upon looking back. He was indicted on eight counts of aggravated statutory rape and one count of sexual exploitation of the girl after a grand jury returned the indictments in March 2019. In September 2020 Walker pleaded guilty to all counts and was sentenced to an additional six years and one month in prison. He was also required to register as a sex offender.

== Additional legal proceedings ==
A lawsuit was filed on November 23, 2016 on behalf of a deceased victim's parent and alleged that the driver was negligent and careless in his driving. It also targeted Durham School Services and alleged that it did not have policies and procedures in place to ensure that all school bus drivers were properly hired, trained, supervised, investigated, and disciplined. On November 29, 2016 a second lawsuit was filed by an injured child's parent against Walker and Durham School Services, and alleged the child suffered serious "psychological and emotional injuries" and were seeking damages for medical expenses.

On December 5, 2016 a third lawsuit was filed on behalf of an injured student who suffered a severe traumatic brain injury as a result of the crash. In addition to naming Walker and the Durham School Services, it also named National Express LLC which is the parent company of Durham School Services. Two more lawsuits were filed on December 7, 2016 against all three groups on behalf of two injured students and allege that Walker was driving negligently and that the injuries the children sustained will be costly and potentially permanent.
