= WAAY-TV =

Television station in Huntsville, Alabama

- Huntsville–Decatur, Alabama; United States
- City: Huntsville, Alabama
- Channels: Digital: 17 (UHF); Virtual: 31
- Branding: WAAY 31; (call sign pronounced "way")

Programming
- Affiliations: 31.1: ABC; for others, see § Subchannels

Ownership
- Owner: Gray Media; (Gray Television Licensee, LLC)
- Sister stations: WAFF; WTHV-LD

History
- First air date: August 1, 1959
- Former call signs: WAFG-TV (1959–1963)
- Former channel numbers: Analog: 31 (UHF, 1959–2009); Digital: 32 (UHF, 2001–2019)
- Former affiliations: ABC (1959–1967); CBS (secondary, 1959–1963); NBC (primary 1968–1977, secondary 1983–1988)
- Call sign meaning: Corresponds to former sister radio station's branding as "The Great American WAAY", with an extraneous A

Technical information
- Licensing authority: FCC
- Facility ID: 57292
- ERP: 356 kW
- HAAT: 538.3 m (1,766 ft)
- Transmitter coordinates: 34°44′12.8″N 86°31′58.9″W

Links
- Public license information: Public file; LMS

WAAY-TV (channel 31) is a television station in Huntsville, Alabama, United States, affiliated with ABC. It is owned by Gray Media alongside NBC affiliate WAFF (channel 48) and low-power Telemundo affiliate WTHV-LD (channel 29). The three stations share studios on Memorial Parkway (US 431) in Huntsville; WAAY-TV's transmitter is located on Monte Sano Boulevard on top of Monte Sano Mountain.

== History ==
The station's first broadcast was on August 1, 1959, as WAFG-TV. It was the second television outlet in the Huntsville region, signing on five years after NBC affiliate WMSL-TV (now WAFF). In addition, WAFG-TV is the longest serving station licensed to Huntsville, as WMSL was still licensed to Decatur at the time.

From its launch, WAFG was Alabama's first primary ABC affiliate, which was an unusual arrangement for a two-station market, especially one as small as Huntsville was at the time. When the station was sold to Smith Broadcasting (owners of WAAY radio, now WLOR) in 1963, the call sign was changed to WAAY-TV. At the time Smith Broadcasting held a permit from the FCC to put a new station on the air broadcasting on UHF channel 25, but when the Smith family received the offer to purchase WAFG, they decided to take that instead of building a new facility. (Channel 25 was later licensed to Alabama Public Television station WHIQ.)

WAAY-TV switched its network affiliation to NBC on September 2, 1968, but returned to ABC nine years later, on December 11, 1977, citing ABC's higher network ratings at that time and the lack of a duplicate ABC affiliate in Florence (where WOWL, now WHDF, was then an NBC affiliate) as reasons. Despite ABC's fall from first place in the 1980s in favor of a renewed NBC, WAAY still routinely came in first or second place in the ratings during the 1980s and 1990s. However, despite having left full NBC affiliation behind back in 1977, WAAY would once again clear some NBC programming during the 1980s, most notably Late Night with David Letterman and Friday Night Videos, which WAFF preempted in favor of evangelist Jimmy Swaggart's daily program at 11:30 p.m. It was only when Swaggart had to discontinue his weekday show in the aftermath of his sexual scandal in 1988 that WAFF resumed carrying Letterman and FNV. Since that time, WAAY has remained an exclusive ABC affiliate, clearing most if not all of its programs.

WAAY-TV was an early adopter of weather radar systems for its weather coverage in the early 1970s. During the 1974 tornado outbreak, the station was able to track the storms in real time using its radar system, while other media outlets had to rely on telephoned reports of visual sightings, as had been done traditionally. In 1995, the station decided to expand its internal data network to become the Internet service provider now known as HiWAAY Information Services. The service survived a period of intense local competition in the Huntsville area in the 1990s and 2000s, and remains in business as an independent regional provider.

Smith Broadcasting sold WAAY-TV to GOCOM Broadcasting (originally Grapevine Communications, later renamed Piedmont Communications) in 1999. The Smith family, who previously owned broadcasting properties in Birmingham before coming to Huntsville, was the last local owner of a Huntsville television station as rivals WHNT-TV and WAFF had been sold to larger corporations years before. WZDX, which was the first station in northern Alabama not affiliated with the traditional networks or the educational television system, has always belonged to outside interests. The Smith family also, at various times, owned radio stations in Fort Walton Beach, Florida and South Pittsburg, Tennessee. Between 1969 and 1982, all three of Huntsville's major-network affiliates (WAAY included) had studios located beside its transmitters and towers on Monte Sano.

After a 1982 fire gutted the building of WAFF, that station and later WHNT moved offices and production facilities into the city itself employing microwave relays to send signals to the transmitters. Only WAAY continued to maintain full operations on Monte Sano Boulevard. WHIQ-TV, which is a PBS member station, serves as a translator relay of Alabama Public Television with programming originating from Birmingham, not Huntsville. On September 4, 2003, the 1,000-foot (305 m) broadcasting tower leased by WAAY collapsed, killing three people.

In 2006, Piedmont Broadcasting agreed to sell WAAY to Calkins Media, a Pennsylvania-based company that owned several small newspapers in Pennsylvania and two television stations in Florida, WWSB in Sarasota and WTXL in Tallahassee. The sale to Calkins became official on February 1, 2007. WAAY was Calkins' only broadcasting property outside of Florida.

On April 11, 2016, it was reported that Calkins would exit the broadcasting industry and sell its stations to Raycom Media. As Raycom already owned WAFF, WAAY's license was instead to be sold to American Spirit Media, with Raycom operating the station under a shared services agreement. However, on August 26, 2016, Calkins agreed to instead sell WAAY to Heartland Media, through its USA Television MidAmerica Holdings joint venture with MSouth Equity Partners. The sale was completed on April 30, 2017, making WAAY a sister station to adjacent market station WTVA in Tupelo, Mississippi. In October 2019, Allen Media Broadcasting announced that it would acquire eleven of Heartland Media's television stations, including WAAY and WTVA, for $290 million.

On June 1, 2025, amid financial woes and rising debt, Allen Media Group announced that it would explore "strategic options" for the company, such as a sale of its television stations (including WAAY). On August 8, 2025, it was announced that AMG would sell 12 of its stations, including WAAY, to Gray Media for $171 million; in the Huntsville market, this would create a duopoly with WAFF. The sale was completed on May 1, 2026.

== News operation ==
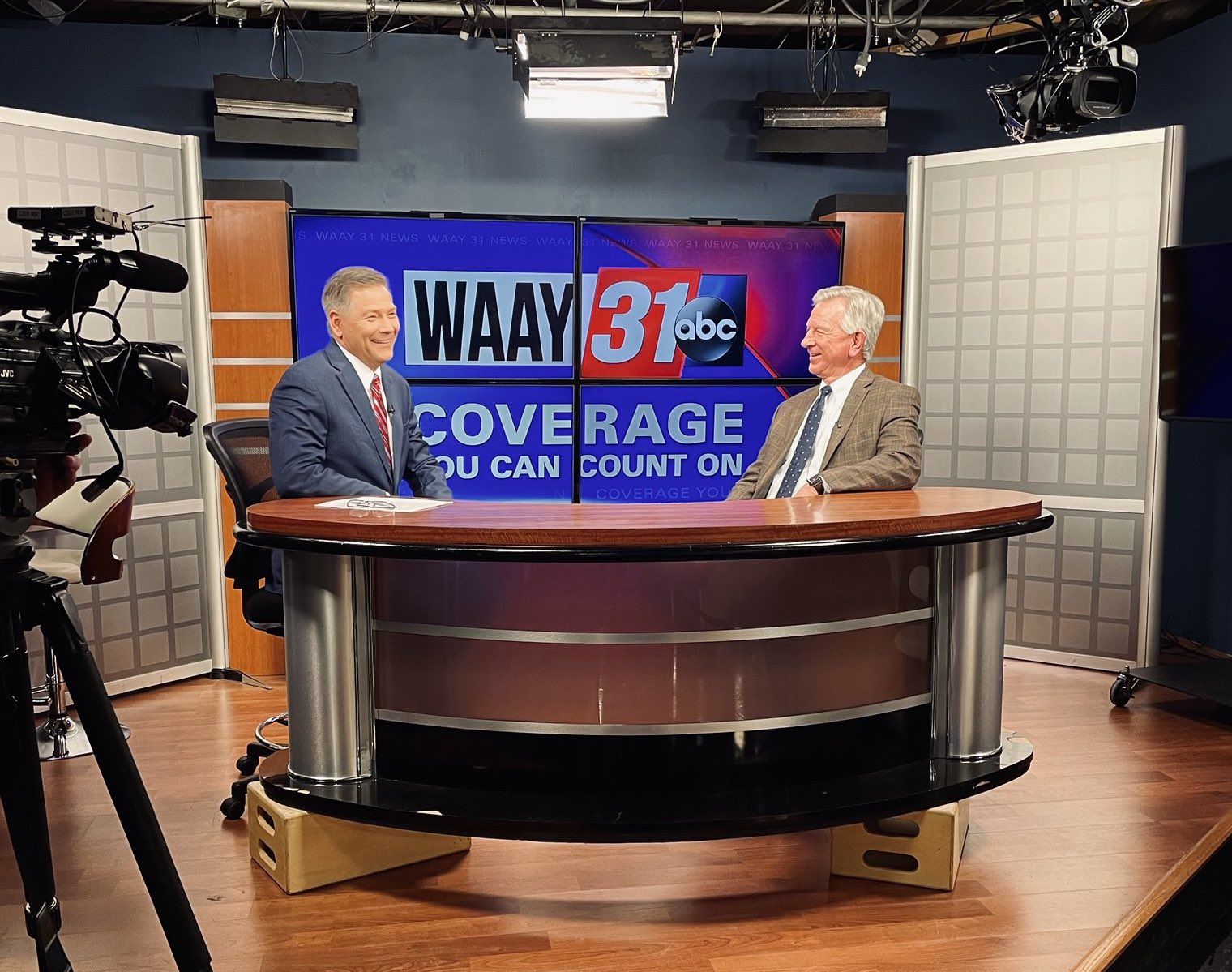
Senator Tommy Tuberville being interviewed by Dan Schaffer of WAAY-TV in 2021.

In the spring 2007 ratings period, all of the station's newscasts ranked in third place. This was in contrast to the period from the 1970s through the early 1990s, when WAAY was still family-owned. On July 16, 2007, WAAY unveiled a new set and graphics package similar to that of sister stations WWSB and WTXL. Beginning September 13, 2010, its news title became WAAY 31 FirstNews. The station was the first to air a 4:30 a.m. newscast in the market and was the only station in the area that aired local news weekday at 11 a.m. and 4 p.m. The channel produced a prime time newscast at 9 p.m. for UPN affiliate WHDF during the early 2000s. On September 20, 2010, through a new news share agreement, a second WAAY-produced broadcast at 9 p.m. began airing every night on Fox affiliate WZDX. In addition to its main studios, WAAY maintained news bureaus in Decatur (on Lee Street Northeast) and Florence (on North Pine Street within the University of North Alabama campus). The station operated its own weather radar at the main studios called "Live Storm Force 31 Doppler Max".

On December 12, 2011, WAAY began broadcasting its news programming in high definition, making it the third station in the Huntsville television market to do so behind WAFF and WHNT. The WZDX broadcasts were included in the upgrade.

In mid-2014, the station launched three websites, SpaceAlabama.com, RedstoneAlabama.com, and TechAlabama.com to cover the space, military, and technology industries in the Northern Alabama area. As of 2021, though, the websites are defunct.

In late-September 2014, the StormForce 31 Weather Team launched a 24/7 weather channel for Northern Alabama called StormForce 31 WeatherNation. The channel featured regional and national weather from WeatherNation TV with local forecasts from the WAAY weather team, every 10 minutes on the 5's. The channel was seen on digital channel 31.2 until August 2017.

In August 2017, WAAY-TV announced that Ion Television would replace WeatherNation on 31.2.

On January 17, 2025, Allen Media Group announced plans to cut local meteorologist/weather forecaster positions from its stations, including WAAY, and replacing them with a "weather hub" produced by The Weather Channel, which AMG also owns. The decision was reversed within a week by management in response to "viewer and advertiser reaction".

On August 3, 2026, WAAY's news and weather apps were discontinued and merged into the apps of WAFF. On August 6, WAFF chief meteorologist Brad Travis revealed that WAAY would begin to simulcast WAFF's newscasts on August 13, officially merging the two news operations.

== Technical information ==
=== Subchannels ===
The station's signal is multiplexed:

Subchannels of WAAY
Subchannel	Res.	Short name	Programming
31.1	720p	WAAY-HD	ABC
31.2	480i	ION	Ion
31.3	480i	DABL	Dabl
31.4	480i	QVC	QVC
31.5	480i	H&I	Heroes & Icons
31.6	720p	MORE	Local weather
31.7	480i	CATCHY	Catchy Comedy
31.8	480i	TOONS	MeTV Toons

Since 2021, the Rocket City Trash Pandas, the Double-A affiliate of the Los Angeles Angels, air home games on WAAY's sixth subchannel.

=== Analog-to-digital conversion ===
WAAY-TV shut down its analog signal, over UHF channel 31, on February 17, 2009, to conclude the federally mandated transition from analog to digital television. The station's digital signal remained on its pre-transition UHF channel 32, using virtual channel 31.
