= WTHV-LD =

Television station in Huntsville, Alabama

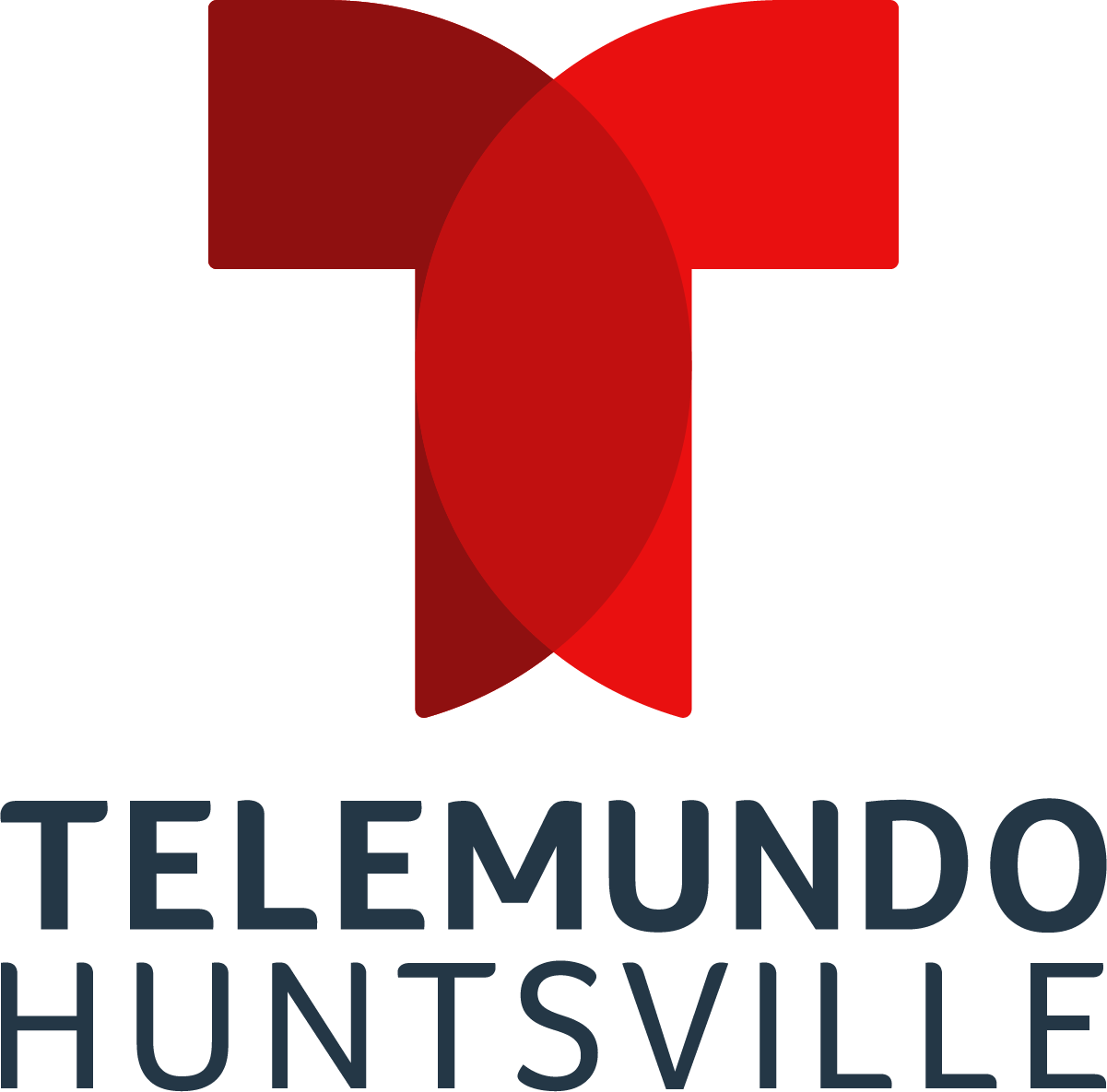
- Huntsville, Alabama; United States
- Channels: Digital: 32 (UHF); Virtual: 29
- Branding: Telemundo Huntsville

Programming
- Affiliations: 29.1: Telemundo; for others, see § Subchannels

Ownership
- Owner: Gray Media; (Gray Television Licensee, LLC)
- Sister stations: WAAY-TV; WAFF

History
- First air date: August 4, 1992
- Former call signs: W43AB (1992–1995); WMJN-LP (1995–2013); WMJN-LD (2013–2022)
- Former channel numbers: Analog: 43 (UHF, 1992–1995), 29 (UHF, 1995–2013); Digital: 29 (UHF, 2013–2021)
- Former affiliations: Heartland (until 2022); NBC (29.2, via WAFF, 2022–2024)
- Call sign meaning: Telemundo Huntsville

Technical information
- Licensing authority: FCC
- Facility ID: 10593
- Class: LD
- ERP: 15 kW
- HAAT: 516.8 m (1,696 ft)
- Transmitter coordinates: 34°42′39.3″N 86°32′7″W

Links
- Public license information: LMS

WTHV-LD (channel 29) is a low-power television station in Huntsville, Alabama, United States, affiliated with the Spanish-language network Telemundo. It is owned by Gray Media alongside ABC affiliate WAAY-TV (channel 31) and NBC affiliate WAFF (channel 48). The three stations share studios on Memorial Parkway (US 431) in Huntsville; WTHV-LD's transmitter is located south of Monte Sano State Park.

== History ==
On January 19, 2022, it was announced that Gray Television would purchase the station, then known as WMJN-LD, from Emmanuel Broadcasting Corporation for $330,000; the sale was completed on March 8.

Gray announced on May 3, 2022, that it had reached an agreement with NBCUniversal to start Telemundo channels, primarily as adjuncts to Gray stations, in 22 additional Southern markets and renew existing affiliations in 12 others. The new service launched September 2, 2022, with the renamed WTHV-LD also carrying a simulcast of WAFF's main NBC subchannel on 29.2. As of 2024, WTHV-LD no longer simulcasts WAFF, but has added new subchannels from Free TV Networks including Defy, The365 and Outlaw.

== Subchannels ==
The station's signal is multiplexed:

Subchannels of WTHV-LD
Subchannel	Res.	Short name	Programming
29.1	1080i	WTHVLD1	Telemundo
29.2	480i	DEFY	Defy
29.3	480i	THE365	365BLK
29.4	480i	OUTLAW	Outlaw
