= WHDF =

Television station in Florence, Alabama

- Florence–Huntsville–Decatur, Alabama; United States
- City: Florence, Alabama
- Channels: Digital: 2 (VHF); Virtual: 15
- Branding: North Alabama's CW 15; News 19

Programming
- Affiliations: 15.1: The CW; for others, see § Subchannels

Ownership
- Owner: Nexstar Media Group; (Nexstar Media Inc.)
- Sister stations: WHNT-TV; Tegna: WZDX

History
- First air date: October 28, 1957
- Former call signs: WOWL-TV (1957–1999)
- Former channel numbers: Analog: 15 (UHF, 1957–2009); Digital: 14 (UHF, 2001–2019)
- Former affiliations: NBC (1957–1999); UPN (1999–2006)
- Call sign meaning: Huntsville, Decatur, Florence

Technical information
- Licensing authority: FCC
- Facility ID: 65128
- ERP: 21 kW
- HAAT: 431 m (1,414 ft)
- Transmitter coordinates: 35°0′9″N 87°8′9″W
- Translator(s): WHNT-TV 19.2 Huntsville

Links
- Public license information: Public file; LMS
- Website: whnt.com/north-alabamas-cw/

WHDF (channel 15) is a television station licensed to Florence, Alabama, United States, serving as the CW outlet for the Huntsville area. It is owned by Nexstar Media Group alongside CBS affiliate WHNT-TV (channel 19); Nexstar's Tegna subsidiary owns Fox affiliate WZDX (channel 54). WHDF and WHNT-TV share studios on Holmes Avenue Northwest in downtown Huntsville; WHDF's transmitter is located southeast of Minor Hill, Tennessee.

In addition to its own digital signal, WHDF is simulcast in 720p high definition on WHNT-TV's second digital subchannel (19.2) from a transmitter on Monte Sano Mountain.

== History ==
The station began on October 28, 1957, as WOWL-TV, based in Florence. The station was owned by Richard "Dick" Biddle's TV Muscle Shoals, Inc., along with WOWL radio (1240 AM, later WBCF, now defunct), which was sold by Biddle in 1973. Up until late 1999, that station broadcast NBC programs to northwestern Alabama and portions of southern middle Tennessee and northeastern Mississippi; it also carried some popular CBS shows like the soap opera As the World Turns.

WOWL-TV always faced competing NBC affiliates in Huntsville–Decatur (in later years WAFF, channel 48) or even Tupelo (WTVA), whose signals reached much of its broadcast area. However, it retained viewership in northwest Alabama (Florence, Sheffield, Muscle Shoals, Tuscumbia and areas known as "The Shoals" in recent times and referred to as "The Quad Cities" years ago) by offering local newscasts, which for most of the station's 40-plus years were the only newscasts concerned specifically with northwestern Alabama. Over time, though, with the Huntsville stations, especially WAFF, expanding news bureaus of their own into the Shoals in the 1980s and 1990s, WOWL-TV lost much of its traditional advantage.

By the late 1990s, this duplication had progressed to the point that the station could no longer focus solely on northwest Alabama and remain viable. The owners opted to sell to outside interests, who dropped NBC in favor of UPN in the fall of 1999, making WAFF the sole NBC outlet in north Alabama. Shortly before that, on July 19, the call letters were changed to the current WHDF, with a move of the transmitter and tower to Giles County, Tennessee. The new tower transmitted from a location high enough to provide a coverage area comparable to the other north Alabama stations, while remaining within 15 miles (24 km) of Florence as required by FCC regulations.

During the early 2000s, Viacom owned 17.5% of the station.

In 2004, Lockwood Broadcast Group acquired WHDF. Lockwood provided content delivery and back-office function from the company's headquarters in Virginia. Completed in 2007, the "hub" facility has remotely operated WHDF since that year.

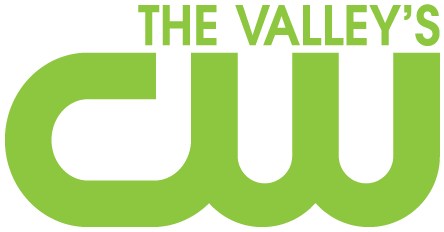
Logo as "The Valley's CW", from 2006 to 2020

In September 2006, both UPN and The WB ceased operations. A single new network, The CW, replaced those two struggling entities. WHDF, the UPN affiliate, was granted the northern Alabama affiliation rights for the new network earlier that year, and rebranded as The Valley's CW at midnight on July 27, 2006. (The former WB affiliate, meanwhile, became WAMY-TV, affiliated with MyNetworkTV.)

Local employees at WHDF's Florence and Huntsville facilities totaled fewer than ten, according to Census business statistics in 2010.

On July 15, 2018, Lockwood Broadcast Group reached an agreement to sell WHDF to Nexstar Media Group for $2.25 million; Nexstar concurrently took over the station's operations through a time brokerage agreement. The sale was completed on November 9, creating a duopoly with Fox affiliate WZDX (channel 54).

Only 24 days after the acquisition of WHDF by Nexstar closed, on December 3, 2018, Nexstar announced it would acquire the assets of Chicago-based Tribune Media—which has owned CBS affiliate WHNT-TV since December 2013—for $6.4 billion in cash and debt. As Nexstar already owned WHDF and WZDX, the company agreed on March 20, 2019, to divest WZDX to Tegna Inc. as part of a series of transactions with multiple companies that totaled $1.32 billion. (As WHDF does not rank among the top four in total-day viewership and therefore is not in conflict with existing FCC in-market ownership rules, it was retained by Nexstar, thus creating a new duopoly with WHNT.) The sale was completed on September 19, 2019.

== Technical information ==
=== Subchannels ===
The station's signal is multiplexed:

Subchannels of WHDF
| Subchannel | Res. | Short name | Programming |
|---|---|---|---|
| 15.1 | 1080i | WHDF-DT | The CW |
| 15.2 | 480i | CourtTV | Court TV → Outlaw (soon) |
| 15.3 | 480i | Rewind | Rewind TV |
| 15.4 | 480i | Charge | Charge! |

=== Analog-to-digital conversion ===
WHDF shut down its analog signal, over UHF channel 15, on June 12, 2009, as part of the federally mandated transition from analog to digital television. The station's digital signal remained on its pre-transition UHF channel 14, using virtual channel 15.
