= List of tallest structures =

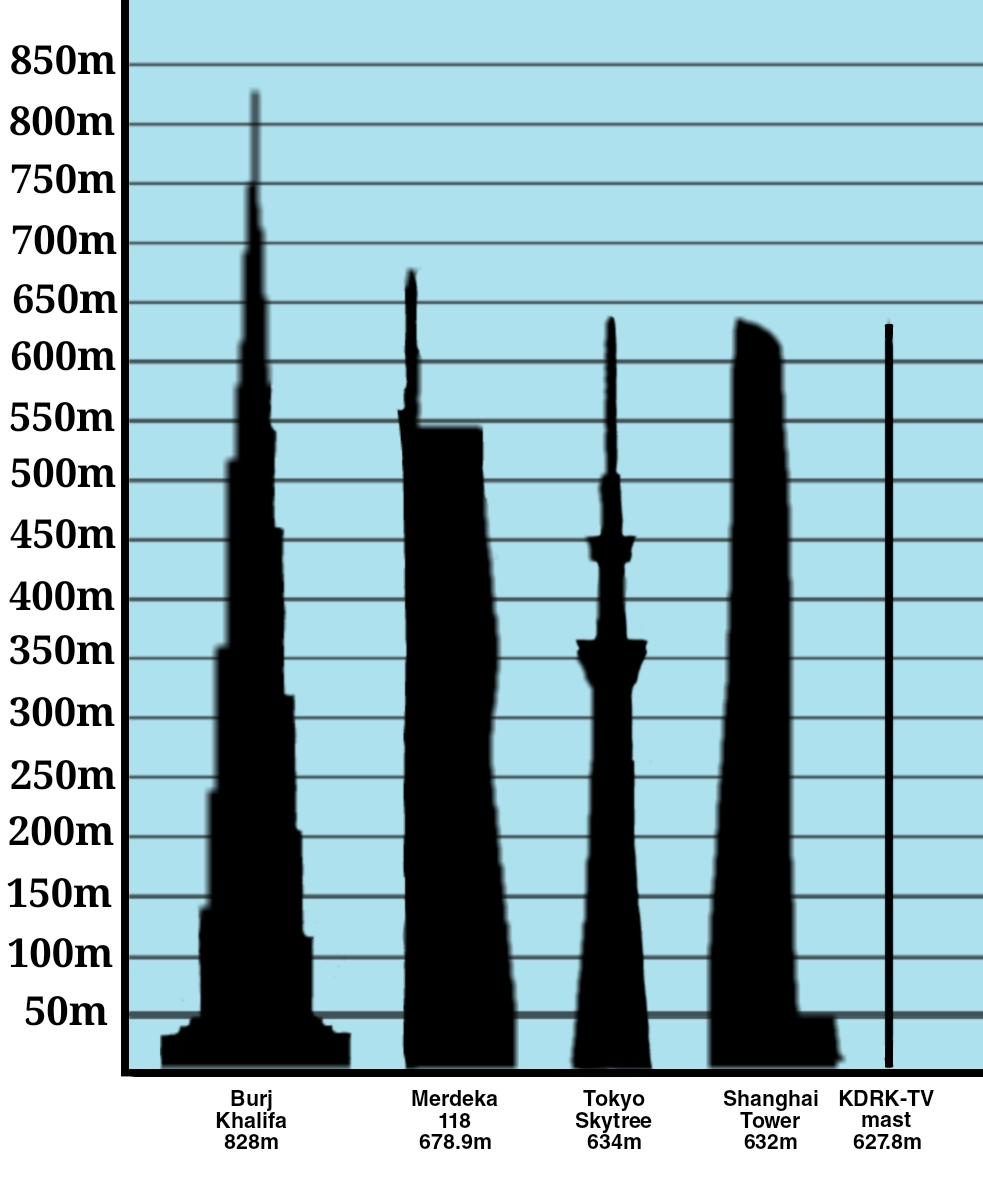
Tallest structures in the world as of 2026: 1. Burj Khalifa skyscraper; 2. Merdeka 118 skyscraper; 3. Tokyo Skytree; 4. Shanghai Tower skyscraper; 5. KRDK-TV mast

The tallest structure in the world is the Burj Khalifa, a skyscraper at 828 m (2,717 ft). Listed are guyed masts (such as telecommunication masts), self-supporting towers (such as the CN Tower), skyscrapers (such as the Willis Tower), oil platforms, electricity transmission towers, and bridge support towers. This list is organized by absolute height. See History of the world's tallest structures, Tallest structures by category, and List of tallest buildings for additional information about these types of structures.

== Terminology ==
Terminological and listing criteria follow Council on Tall Buildings and Urban Habitat definitions. Guyed masts are differentiated from towers – the latter not featuring any guy wires or other support structures; and buildings are differentiated from towers – the former having at least 50% of occupiable floor space although both are self-supporting structures.

== Lists by height ==
This list includes structures of all types over 350 meters (1148 feet).

For all structures, the pinnacle height is given, so the height of skyscrapers may differ from the values at List of skyscrapers, such as the John Hancock Center being ranked above the Empire State Building. Tension-leg platforms are not included.

Structure no longer standing	Structure mostly under water	Guyed mast

Name	Pinnacle height	Year	Structure type	Main use	Country	Town	Remarks	Coordinates
Burj Khalifa	829.8 m (2,722 ft)	2010	Skyscraper	Office, hotel, residential	United Arab Emirates	Dubai	Tallest human-built structure in the world. Height includes 244 m spire	25°11′50.0″N 55°16′26.6″E
Merdeka Maybank Tower	680.5 m (2,233 ft)	2023	Skyscraper	Office, hotel, residential	Malaysia	Kuala Lumpur	Second tallest structure in the world	3°08′30″N 101°42′03″E
Warsaw Radio Mast	646.4 m (2,121 ft)	1974	Guyed mast	LF transmission	Poland	Gąbin-Konstantynów, Masovian Voivodeship	Insulated; collapsed on August 8, 1991 during guy wire exchange. Several parts of the tower were repaired and used in other structures.	52°22′3.74″N 19°48′8.73″E
Petronius Platform	640 m (2,100 ft)	2000	Offshore platform	Oil drilling	United States Exclusive Economic Zone	Petronius field, Gulf of Mexico	Located appr. 210 kilometers (130 mi) southeast of New Orleans. Tallest structure in the Western Hemisphere.	29°06′30″N 87°56′30″W
Tokyo Skytree	634.0 m (2,080.1 ft)	2012	Lattice tower	Observation, VHF-UHF transmission	Japan	Tokyo	Topped out on March 18, 2011, tallest tower in the world, tallest structure in Japan	35°42′36.5″N 139°48′39″E
Shanghai Tower	632.0 m (2,073.5 ft)	2015	Skyscraper	Residential, observation	China	Shanghai	Completed, topped out in August 2013. Tallest structure in China and third tallest skyscraper in the world.	31°14′7.8″N 121°30′3.6″E
KRDK-TV mast	627.8 m (2,060 ft)	1998	Guyed mast	VHF-UHF transmission	United States	Galesburg, North Dakota	Rebuilt after collapses on February 14, 1968 and April 6, 1997. Tallest structure in the United States.	47°16′45″N 97°20′27″W
KXTV/KOVR tower	624.5 m (2,049 ft)	1985	Guyed mast	VHF-UHF transmission	United States	Walnut Grove, California	Tallest structure in California, also known as "Sacramento Joint Venture Tower".	38°14′23.2″N 121°30′05.7″W
KATV tower	609.6 m (2,000 ft)	1965	Guyed mast	VHF-UHF transmission	United States	Barraque Township, Arkansas	Was tallest structure in Arkansas, collapsed on January 11, 2008	34°28′24.0″N 92°12′11″W
KCAU TV Tower	609.6 m (2,000 ft)	1965	Guyed mast	VHF-UHF transmission	United States	Sioux City, Iowa	Tallest structure in Iowa (equal)	42°35′11.0″N 96°13′57″W
WECT tower	609.6 m (2,000 ft)	1969	Guyed mast	VHF-UHF transmission	United States	Colly Township, North Carolina	Demolished on September 20, 2012. Was once the tallest structure in North Carolina	34°34′44.0″N 78°26′12″W
KCCI Tower	609.6 m (2,000 ft)	1972	Guyed mast	VHF-TV, FM radio transmission	United States	Alleman, Iowa	Tallest structure in Iowa (equal)	41°48′33.0″N 93°36′53″W
Des Moines Hearst-Argyle Television Tower Alleman	609.6 m (2,000 ft)	1974	Guyed mast	VHF-UHF transmission	United States	Alleman, Iowa	Tallest structure in Iowa (equal)	41°48′35.0″N 93°37′17″W
Diversified Communications Tower	609.6 m (2,000 ft)	1981	Guyed mast	VHF-UHF transmission	United States	Floyd Dale, South Carolina	Tallest structure in South Carolina (equal)	34°22′03.0″N 79°19′48″W
AFLAC Tower	609.6 m (2,000 ft)	1984	Guyed mast	VHF-UHF transmission	United States	Rowley, Iowa	Tallest structure in Iowa (equal)	42°24′02.0″N 91°50′37″W
WBTV-Tower	609.6 m (2,000 ft)	1984	Guyed mast	VHF-UHF transmission	United States	Dallas, North Carolina	Tallest structure in North Carolina (equal)	35°21′51.0″N 81°11′12″W
KTVO-TV Tower	609.6 m (2,000 ft)	1987	Guyed mast	VHF-UHF transmission	United States	Missouri	Collapsed on June 2, 1988	40°31′47″N 92°26′29″W
Hearst-Argyle Tower	609.6 m (2,000 ft)	1985	Guyed mast	VHF-UHF transmission	United States	Walnut Grove, California		38°15′52.1″N 121°29′25.5″W
WTTO Tower	609.6 m (2,000 ft)	1986	Guyed mast	VHF-UHF transmission	United States	Windham Springs, Alabama	Tallest structure in Alabama	33°28′51.0″N 87°24′03″W
WCSC-Tower	609.6 m (2,000 ft)	1986	Guyed mast	VHF-UHF transmission	United States	Awendaw, South Carolina	Tallest structure in South Carolina (equal)	32°55′29.0″N 79°41′57″W
WCTV Tower	609.6 m (2,000 ft)	1987	Guyed mast	VHF-UHF transmission	United States	Metcalf, Georgia	Tallest structure in Georgia	30°40′14.0″N 83°56′26″W
WRAL HDTV Mast	609.6 m (2,000 ft) (orig. 609.3 m)	1991	Guyed mast	VHF-UHF transmission	United States	Auburn, North Carolina	Rebuild of 2 masts which collapsed in December 1989	35°40′35.1″N 78°32′07.2″W
TV Alabama Tower	609.6 m (2,000 ft)	1996	Guyed mast	VHF-UHF transmission	United States	Windham Springs, Alabama	Tallest structure in Alabama	33°28′48.0″N 87°25′50″W
KDLT Tower	609.6 m (2,000 ft)	1998	Guyed mast	VHF-UHF transmission	United States	Rowena, South Dakota	Tallest structure in South Dakota	43°30′18.0″N 96°33′23″W
KMOS TV Tower	609.6 m (2,000 ft)	2002	Guyed mast	VHF-UHF transmission	United States	Syracuse, Missouri	Tallest structure in Missouri; also called Rohn tower .	38°37′36.0″N 92°52′04″W
Winnie Cumulus Broadcasting Tower	609.6 m (2,000 ft)	2005	Guyed mast	VHF-UHF transmission	United States	Winnie, Texas	Tallest structure in Texas (equal)	29°56′09.8″N 94°30′39.4″W
Liberman Broadcasting Tower Era	609.6 m (2,000 ft)	2006	Guyed mast	VHF-UHF transmission	United States	Era, Texas	Tallest structure in Texas (equal)	33°29′05.5″N 97°24′44.8″W
WEAU-Tower	609.6 m (2,000 ft)	2012	Guyed mast	VHF-UHF transmission	United States	Fairchild, Wisconsin	Tallest structure in Wisconsin; original built in 1966, collapsed during ice & wind storm on March 22, 2011; replacement, still at 2,000 feet, began service January 4, 2012	44°39′50.0″N 90°57′41″W
Perry Broadcasting Tower	609.5 m (2,000 ft)	2004	Guyed mast	VHF-UHF transmission	United States	Alfalfa, Oklahoma	Tallest structure in Oklahoma	35°15′03.8″N 98°36′53.8″W
KY3 Tower	609.4 m (1,999 ft)	2000	Guyed mast	VHF-UHF transmission	United States	Fordland, Missouri		37°10′26.0″N 92°56′28.1″W
SpectraSite Tower Thomasville	609.4 m (1,999 ft)	2002	Guyed mast	VHF-UHF transmission	United States	Thomasville, Georgia		30°40′50.3″N 83°58′20.6″W
Pegasus Broadcasting Tower	609.4 m (1,999 ft)	?	Guyed mast	VHF-UHF transmission	United States	Metcalf, Georgia		30°40′52.0″N 83°58′21″W
KLDE Tower	609.3 m (1,999 ft)	1986	Guyed mast	VHF-UHF transmission	United States	Liverpool, Texas	Also known as Clear Channel Broadcasting Tower, TX	29°17′17.0″N 95°13′54″W
WCKW/KSTE-Tower	609.3 m (1,999 ft)	1988	Guyed mast	VHF-UHF transmission	United States	Vacherie, Louisiana	Also known as Clear Channel Broadcasting Tower, LA; collapsed in late August, 2021 during Hurricane Ida	29°57′11.0″N 90°43′26″W
American Towers Tower Elkhart	609.3 m (1,999 ft)	2001	Guyed mast	VHF-UHF transmission	United States	Elkhart, Iowa		41°49′48.0″N 93°36′54.6″W
Salem Radio Properties Tower	609.3 m (1,999 ft)	2002	Guyed mast	VHF-UHF transmission	United States	Collinsville, Texas		33°32′08.4″N 96°49′55″W
Stowell Cumulus Broadcasting Tower	609.3 m (1,999 ft)	2001	Guyed mast	VHF-UHF transmission	United States	Stowell, Texas	Built, although mentioned in FCC-list as granted	29°41′52.5″N 94°24′9.3″W
WLBT Tower	609 m (1,998 ft)	1999	Guyed mast	VHF-UHF transmission	United States	Raymond, Mississippi	Tallest structure in Mississippi	32°12′49.9″N 90°22′56.5″W
KYTV Tower 2	608.4 m (1,996 ft)	1973	Guyed mast	VHF-UHF transmission	United States	Marshfield, Missouri	Also known as American Tower Management	37°13′09.4″N 92°56′57.4″W
SpectraSite Tower Raymond	608.4 m (1,996 ft)	?	Guyed mast	VHF-UHF transmission	United States	Raymond, Mississippi		32°12′11.9″N 90°23′34.8″W
Hoyt Radio Tower	608.38 m (1,996.0 ft)	2003	Guyed mast	VHF-UHF transmission	United States	Hoyt, Colorado	Tallest structure in Colorado	39°55′21.8″N 103°58′20.2″W
Service Broadcasting Tower Decatur	608.1 m (1,995 ft)	2000	Guyed mast	VHF-UHF transmission	United States	Decatur, Texas		33°23′12.0″N 97°33′58″W
WTVD Tower	607.8 m (1,994 ft)	1978	Guyed mast	VHF-UHF transmission	United States	Auburn, North Carolina		35°40′06.0″N 78°31′58″W
Channel 40 Tower	607.8 m (1,994 ft)	1985	Guyed mast	VHF-UHF transmission	United States	Walnut Grove, California		38°16′21.4″N 121°30′21.6″W
Liberman Broadcasting Tower Devers	607.7 m (1,994 ft)	2006	Guyed mast	VHF-UHF transmission	United States	Devers, Texas		30°01′02.2″N 94°32′47.9″W
KHYS Tower	607.2 m (1,992 ft)	1997	Guyed mast	VHF-UHF transmission	United States	Devers, Texas	Dismantled	30°03′07.0″N 94°31′39″W
Clear Channel Broadcasting Tower Devers	607 m (1,991 ft)	1988	Guyed mast	VHF-UHF transmission	United States	Devers, Texas		30°03′06.0″N 94°31′38″W
Media General Tower	607 m (1,991 ft)	1987	Guyed mast	VHF-UHF transmission	United States	Awendaw, South Carolina		32°56′25.0″N 79°41′44″W
Eastern North Carolina Broadcasting Tower	606.2 m (1,989 ft)	1980	Guyed mast	VHF-UHF transmission	United States	Trenton, North Carolina		35°06′16.0″N 77°20′11″W
WNCN Tower	606.2 m (1,989 ft)	2000	Guyed mast	VHF-UHF transmission	United States	Garner, North Carolina		35°40′29.0″N 78°31′39.0″W
KELO TV Tower	605 m (1,985 ft)	1974	Guyed mast	VHF-UHF transmission	United States	Rowena, South Dakota		43°31′07.0″N 96°32′06″W
KVLY-TV mast	605 m (1,984 ft)	1963	Guyed mast	VHF-UHF transmission	United States	Blanchard, North Dakota	Tallest mast in the world until 2019, when it was reduced to 605 m (1,985 ft) following an antenna change.	47°20′31.85″N 97°17′21.13″W
WITN Tower	605 m (1,985 ft)	1979	Guyed mast	VHF-UHF transmission	United States	Grifton, North Carolina	Also known as Gray Television Tower	35°21′56.0″N 77°23′37.0″W
Noe Corp Tower	604.7 m (1,984 ft)	1998	Guyed mast	VHF-UHF transmission	United States	Columbia, Louisiana	Tallest structure in Louisiana	32°11′51.0″N 92°04′14″W
Canton Tower	604 m (1,982 ft)	2009	Concrete tower	Observation, VHF-UHF transmission	China	Guangzhou		23°06′32.55″N 113°19′9.29″E
Pappas Telecasting Tower	603.6 m (1,980 ft)	2000	Guyed mast	VHF-UHF transmission	United States	Plymouth County, Iowa		42°35′12.0″N 96°13′19.0″W
KHOU-TV Tower	602 m (1,975 ft)	1992	Guyed mast	VHF-UHF transmission	United States	Missouri City, Texas		29°33′41.0″N 95°30′05″W
Richland Towers Tower Missouri City	601.3 m (1,973 ft)	2001	Guyed mast	VHF-UHF transmission	United States	Missouri City, Texas		29°34′16.0″N 95°30′38″W
Mecca Royal Clock Tower	601 m (1,972 ft)	2011	Skyscraper	Hotel, residential	Saudi Arabia	Mecca	Tallest structure in Saudi Arabia	21°25′08″N 39°49′35″E
Senior Road Tower	600.7 m (1,971 ft)	1983	Guyed mast	VHF-UHF transmission	United States	Missouri City, Texas		29°34′35.0″N 95°30′37″W
KTRK-TV Tower	600.5 m (1,970 ft)	1982	Guyed mast	VHF-UHF transmission	United States	Missouri City, Texas		29°34′28.0″N 95°29′38″W
Houston Tower Joint Venture Tower	600.5 m (1,970 ft)	1985	Guyed mast	VHF-UHF transmission	United States	Missouri City, Texas		29°34′07.0″N 95°29′58″W
American Towers Tower Missouri City	600.5 m (1,970 ft)	2000	Guyed mast	VHF-UHF transmission	United States	Missouri City, Texas		29°33′45.1″N 95°30′35.7″W
KRIV-TV Tower	600.4 m (1,970 ft)	1982	Guyed mast	VHF-UHF transmission	United States	Missouri City, Texas		29°34′29.0″N 95°29′38″W
KTVE-Tower	600.4 m (1,970 ft)	1987	Guyed mast	VHF-UHF transmission	United States	Bolding, Arkansas	Also known as SpectraSite Tower Bolding; tallest structure in Arkansas	33°04′41.0″N 92°13′41″W
Mississippi Telecasting Tower	600 m (1,969 ft)	1982	Guyed mast	VHF-UHF transmission	United States	Inverness, Mississippi		33°22′23.0″N 90°32′25″W
WCNC-TV Tower	600 m (1,969 ft)	1992	Guyed mast	VHF-UHF transmission	United States	Dallas, North Carolina		35°20′49.4″N 81°10′14.2″W
Capstar Radio Tower	600 m (1,969 ft)	2001	Guyed mast	VHF-UHF transmission	United States	Middlesex, North Carolina		35°49′54.0″N 78°08′49″W
WPDE-TV Tower	600 m (1,969 ft)	1980	Guyed mast	VHF-UHF transmission	United States	Dillon, South Carolina		34°21′53.0″N 79°19′49″W
KDUH-TV Mast Hemingford	599 m (1,965 ft)	1969	Guyed mast	VHF-UHF transmission	United States	Hemingford, Nebraska	Collapsed on September 24, 2003	42°10′21.0″N 103°13′59″W
Ping An Finance Centre	599 metres (1,965 ft)	2017	Skyscraper	Office	China	Shenzhen, Guangdong		22°32′11″N 114°3′2″E
American Towers Tower Liverpool	598.3 m (1,963 ft)	1992	Guyed mast	VHF-UHF transmission	United States	Liverpool, Texas		29°17′56.8″N 95°14′12.1″W
Media General Tower Dillon	598 m (1,962 ft)	2001	Guyed mast	VHF-UHF transmission	United States	Dillon, South Carolina		34°22′05.0″N 79°19′20″W
Duffy-Shamrock Joint Venture Tower	597.4 m (1,960 ft)	1990	Guyed mast	VHF-UHF transmission	United States	Bertram, Texas		30°43′34.7″N 97°59′24.1″W
AMFM Tower Collinsville	597.4 m (1,960 ft)	2002	Guyed mast	VHF-UHF transmission	United States	Collinsville, Texas		33°33′37.0″N 96°57′35″W
KOLR/KOZK Tower	597.3 m (1,960 ft) (orig. 609.6 m)	1971	Guyed mast	VHF-UHF transmission	United States	Fordland, Missouri	Also known as KYTV Tower 1; collapsed on April 19, 2018	37°10′11.0″N 92°56′31″W
Goldin Finance 117	597 metres (1,959 ft)	2015	Unfinished skyscraper	Office	China	Tianjin	Skyscraper under construction	39°5′21″N 117°4′49″E
Cosmos Broadcasting Tower Winnabow	595.6 m (1,954 ft)	1981	Guyed mast	VHF-UHF transmission	United States	Winnabow, North Carolina		34°07′54.0″N 78°11′16″W
Spectra Site Communications Tower Robertsdale	592.6 m (1,944 ft)	2001	Guyed mast	VHF-UHF transmission	United States	Robertsdale, Alabama		30°36′41.0″N 87°36′26.4″W
CBC Real Estate Co. Inc Tower	592.4 m (1,944 ft)	1985	Guyed mast	VHF-UHF transmission	United States	Dallas, North Carolina		35°21′44.5″N 81°09′18.3″W
Cosmos Broadcasting Tower Grady	589.8 m (1,935 ft)	1977	Guyed mast	VHF-UHF transmission	United States	Grady, Alabama		31°58′29.0″N 86°09′44″W
American Towers Tower Columbia	587.9 m (1,929 ft)	1986	Guyed mast	VHF-UHF transmission	United States	Columbia, Louisiana		32°05′42.6″N 92°10′34.3″W
Sonsinger Management Tower	587.6 m (1,928 ft)	1988	Guyed mast	VHF-UHF transmission	United States	Splendora, Texas	Also known as KKHT Radio Mast	30°13′54.0″N 95°07′27″W
Cedar Rapids TV Tower	587.3 m (1,927 ft)	1974	Guyed mast	VHF-UHF transmission	United States	Walker, Iowa		42°18′59.0″N 91°51′31″W
Channel 6 Tower Eddy	586.4 m (1,924 ft)	1981	Guyed mast	VHF-UHF transmission	United States	Eddy, Texas		31°16′25.0″N 97°13′15″W
Entravision Texas Tower	585.2 m (1,920 ft)	1998	Guyed mast	VHF-UHF transmission	United States	Greenwood, Texas		33°26′13.0″N 97°29′06″W
Multimedia Associates Tower	584 m (1,916 ft)	1999	Guyed mast	VHF-UHF transmission	United States	Rio Grande City, Texas		26°31′02.0″N 98°39′08″W
American Towers Tower Randleman	583.4 m (1,914 ft)	2004	Guyed mast	VHF-UHF transmission	United States	Randleman, North Carolina		35°52′13.5″N 79°50′24″W
KTUL Tower Coweta	581.8 m (1,909 ft)	1988	Guyed mast	VHF-UHF transmission	United States	Coweta, Oklahoma		35°58′08.0″N 95°36′56″W
American Towers Tower Robertsdale	579.9 m (1,903 ft)	2004	Guyed mast	VHF-UHF transmission	United States	Robertsdale, Alabama		30°36′45.4″N 87°38′41.6″W
Baldpate Platform	579.7 m (1,902 ft)	1998	Offshore platform	Oil drilling	United States Exclusive Economic Zone	Garden Banks, Gulf of Mexico	Located about 193 km (120 mi) off Louisiana coast	
WTVY-TV Tower	579.42 m (1,901.0 ft)	1978	Guyed mast	VHF-UHF transmission	United States	Bethlehem, Florida	Tallest structure in Florida	30°55′12.0″N 85°44′30″W
Redfield Tower	578.8 m (1,899 ft)	1985	Guyed mast	VHF-UHF transmission	United States	Grant County, Arkansas	Also known as Clear Channel Broadcasting Tower Redfield	34°26′31.0″N 92°13′04″W
WFMY Tower	575.9 m (1,889 ft)	2002	Guyed mast	VHF-UHF transmission	United States	Greensboro, North Carolina		35°52′13.5″N 79°50′24″W
Cox Radio Tower	572.8 m (1,879 ft)	2000	Guyed mast	VHF-UHF transmission	United States	Shepherd, Texas		30°32′07.0″N 95°01′05″W
Media General Tower Spanish Fort	572.7 m (1,879 ft)	1986	Guyed mast	VHF-UHF transmission	United States	Spanish Fort, Alabama		30°41′21.0″N 87°49′49″W
WFTV Tower Saint Cloud	571.1 m (1,874 ft)	2000	Guyed mast	VHF-UHF transmission	United States	Saint Cloud, Florida		28°16′45.3″N 81°01′24″W
Capstar Radio Tower	567.1 m (1,861 ft)	1980	Guyed mast	VHF-UHF transmission	United States	Gray Court, South Carolina	Demolished, no longer in FCC list	
KLKN Tower	565.1 m (1,854 ft)	1965	Guyed mast	VHF-UHF transmission	United States	Genoa, Nebraska		41°32′28.0″N 97°40′46″W
Pinnacle Towers Tower Princeton	561.3 m (1,842 ft)	1993	Guyed mast	VHF-UHF transmission	United States	Princeton, Florida		25°32′25.0″N 80°28′06″W
WTVJ Tower Princeton	561.1 m (1,841 ft)	1993	Guyed mast	VHF-UHF transmission	United States	Princeton, Florida		25°32′25.0″N 80°28′06″W
Pappas Partnership Stations Tower Gretna	559.6 m (1,836 ft)	1985	Guyed mast	VHF-UHF transmission	United States	Gretna, Nebraska		41°04′15.9″N 96°13′32.3″W
KBIM Tower	559.02 m (1,834.1 ft)	1965	Guyed mast	VHF-UHF transmission	United States	Roswell, New Mexico		33°03′20.0″N 103°49′14″W
Tulsa Tower Joint Venture Tower Oneta	559 m (1,834 ft)	1984	Guyed mast	VHF-UHF transmission	United States	Oneta, Oklahoma		36°01′15.0″N 95°40′33″W
KTBS Tower	556.5 m (1,826 ft)	2003	Guyed mast	VHF-UHF transmission	United States	Shreveport, Louisiana		32°41′7″N 93°56′1″W
Lotte World Tower	555.7 metres (1,823 ft)	2016	Skyscraper	Hotel, residential	South Korea	Seoul		22°32′11″N 114°3′2″E
CN Tower	553 m (1,814 ft)	1976	Concrete tower	Observation, VHF-UHF transmission, restaurant	Canada	Toronto, Ontario	Tallest freestanding structure in the Western Hemisphere	43°38′33.22″N 79°23′13.41″W
SBA Towers Tower Hayneville	547.7 m (1,797 ft)	1989	Guyed mast	VHF-UHF transmission	United States	Hayneville, Alabama		32°08′30.2″N 86°44′42.1″W
Channel 32 Limited Partnership Tower	547.7 m (1,797 ft)	1990	Guyed mast	VHF-UHF transmission	United States	Hayneville, Alabama		32°08′31.0″N 86°44′42.0″W
KATC Tower Kaplan	546.6 m (1,793 ft)	1978	Guyed mast	VHF-UHF transmission	United States	Kaplan, Louisiana	Collapsed in 2018 after plane crashed into tower	30°02′20.0″N 92°22′15″W
Cosmos Broadcasting Tower Egypt	546.5 m (1,793 ft)	1981	Guyed mast	VHF-UHF transmission	United States	Egypt, Arkansas	KAIT-TV Tower.	35°53′22.0″N 90°56′08″W
One World Trade Center	546.2 m (1,792 ft)	2013	Skyscraper	Office, VHF-UHF transmission	United States	New York City	Tallest skyscraper in the Western Hemisphere	40°42′42″N 74°0′45″W
Raycom Media Tower Mooringsport	545.8 m (1,791 ft)	1975	Guyed mast	VHF-UHF transmission	United States	Mooringsport, Louisiana		32°40′29.0″N 93°56′01″W
Pinnacle Towers Tower Mooringsport	542.8 m (1,781 ft)	1985	Guyed mast	VHF-UHF transmission	United States	Mooringsport, Louisiana		32°39′58.0″N 93°55′59″W
Salem Radio Tower	542.2 m (1,779 ft)	2005	Guyed mast	VHF-UHF transmission	United States	Bold Springs, Georgia		33°52′02.3″N 083°49′44.0″W
Branch Young Broadcasting Tower	541 m (1,775 ft)	?	Guyed mast	VHF-UHF transmission	United States	Branch, Louisiana		30°19′18″N 92°16′58″W
Ostankino Tower	540.1 m (1,772 ft)	1967	Concrete tower	Observation, VHF-UHF transmission	Russia	Moscow	2000 fire led to renovation, tallest structure in Russia	55°49′10.94″N 37°36′41.79″E
KLFY TV Tower Maxie	540.1 m (1,772 ft)	1970	Guyed mast	VHF-UHF transmission	United States	Maxie, Louisiana		30°19′21.0″N 92°22′40″W
Cusseta Richland Towers Tower	538.2 m (1,766 ft)	2005	Guyed mast	VHF-UHF transmission	United States	Cusseta, Georgia		32°19′16.4″N 84°47′28.2″W
Cox Radio Tower Braselton	538 m (1,765 ft)	1984	Guyed mast	VHF-UHF transmission	United States	Braselton, Georgia		34°07′32.0″N 83°51′32″W
American Towers Tower Eglin	537.7 m (1,764 ft)	2001	Guyed mast	VHF-UHF transmission	United States	Elgin, South Carolina	Also known as WOLO TV Tower	34°06′58.4″N 80°45′49.9″W
Alabama Telecasters Tower	535.5 m (1,757 ft)	1995	Guyed mast	VHF-UHF transmission	United States	Gordonsville, Alabama		32°08′58.0″N 86°46′51″W
WIMZ-FM Tower	534.01 m (1,752.0 ft)	1963	Guyed mast	VHF-UHF transmission	United States	Knoxville, Tennessee	Also known as WBIR TV mast, tallest structure in world, 1963	35°59′44.41″N 83°57′23.20″W
WUOT-FM Tower	534.0 m (1,752.0 ft)	2003	Guyed mast	VHF-UHF transmission	United States	Knoxville, Tennessee		36°08′05.49″N 83°43′28.01″W
Capitol Broadcasting Tower Broadway	533.1 m (1,749 ft)	1985	Guyed mast	VHF-UHF transmission	United States	Broadway, North Carolina	Dismantled	35°30′45.0″N 78°58′40″W
Capitol Broadcasting Tower Columbia	533.1 m (1,749 ft)	2000	Guyed mast	VHF-UHF transmission	United States	Columbia, North Carolina		35°30′44.0″N 78°58′41″W
WTVM/WRBL-TV & WVRK-FM Tower	533 m (1,749 ft)	1962	Guyed mast	VHF-UHF transmission	United States	Cusseta, Georgia	Also known as WTVM TV mast, tallest structure in world, 1962–1963	32°19′25.09″N 84°46′45.07″W
WCOM-Mast	532.6 m (1,747 ft)	1985	Guyed mast	VHF-UHF transmission	United States	Butler, Ohio		40°33′22.6″N 82°26′41.1″W
WAVE-Mast	530.05 m (1,739.0 ft)	1990	Guyed mast	VHF-UHF transmission	United States	La Grange, Kentucky		38°27′23.0″N 85°25′28″W
Tianjin CTF Finance Centre	530.4 m (1,740 ft)	2017	Skyscraper	Hotel, residential, office	China	Tianjin		39.0217°N 117.6981°E
Guangzhou CTF Finance Centre	530 m (1,740 ft)	2015	Skyscraper	Hotel, residential, office	China	Guangzhou, Guangdong	Topped-out in 2014	23°07′13″N 113°19′14″E
Louisiana Television Broadcasting Tower Sunshine	529.4 m (1,737 ft)	1972	Guyed mast	VHF-UHF transmission	United States	Sunshine, Louisiana		30°17′49.0″N 91°11′37″W
Bullwinkle Platform	529.1 m (1,736 ft)	1989	Offshore platform	Oil drilling	United States Exclusive Economic Zone	Manatee Field, Gulf of Mexico	Located about 260 kilometers (160 mi) southwest of New Orleans	27°53′1″N 90°54′4″W
Pinnacle Towers Tower Addis	528.8 m (1,735 ft)	1986	Guyed mast	VHF-UHF transmission	United States	Addis, Louisiana		30°19′35.0″N 91°16′36″W
CITIC Tower	528 m (1,732 ft)	2018	Skyscraper	Hotel, residential, office	China	Beijing		39°54′45″N 116°27′58″E
Richland Towers Tower Cedar Hill	527.6 m (1,731 ft)	2004	Guyed mast	VHF-UHF transmission	United States	Cedar Hill, Texas		32°35′02.7″N 96°57′48.8″W
Willis Tower	527 m (1,729 ft)	1974	Skyscraper	Office, observation, VHF-UHF transmission	United States	Chicago, Illinois	Tallest building in world, 1974–1998	41°52′44.1″N 87°38′10.2″W
1 World Trade Center	526.3 m (1,727 ft)	1973	Skyscraper	Office, VHF-UHF transmission	United States	New York City	Destroyed on September 11, 2001	40°42′42″N 74°0′45″W
WAFB Tower Baton Rouge	525.8 m (1,725 ft)	1965	Guyed mast	VHF-UHF transmission	United States	Baton Rouge, Louisiana		30°21′59.0″N 91°12′47″W
WAEO Tower	524.5 m (1,721 ft)	1966	Guyed mast	VHF-UHF transmission	United States	Starks, Wisconsin	Destroyed on November 17, 1968 in aircraft collision	
WTXL Tower	522.5 m (1,714 ft)	1999	Guyed mast	VHF-UHF transmission	United States	Fincher, Florida		30°40′07.0″N 83°58′10″W
Orlando Hearst Argyle Television Tower	522.5 m (1,714 ft)	1980	Guyed mast	VHF-UHF transmission	United States	Orange City, Florida	Height today 510.5 metres	28°56′16.0″N 81°18′57.0″W
Pinnacle Towers Tower Moody	522.4 m (1,714 ft)	1988	Guyed mast	VHF-UHF transmission	United States	Moody, Texas		31°18′54.0″N 97°19′37″W
Clear Channel Broadcasting Tower Rosinton	520.3 m (1,707 ft)	1981	Guyed mast	VHF-UHF transmission	United States	Rosinton, Alabama		
Pacific and Southern Company Tower Lugoff	520.2 m (1,707 ft)	1985	Guyed mast	VHF-UHF transmission	United States	Lugoff, South Carolina		34°05′50.0″N 80°45′50″W
Young Broadcasting Tower Garden City	519.7 m (1,705 ft)	1978	Guyed mast	VHF-UHF transmission	United States	Garden City, South Dakota		44°57′56.0″N 97°35′23″W
Gray Television Tower Carlos	519.7 m (1,705 ft)	1983	Guyed mast	VHF-UHF transmission	United States	Carlos, Texas		30°33′17.0″N 96°01′52″W
South Dakota Public Broadcasting Network Tower	516.7 m (1,695 ft)	1974	Guyed mast	VHF-UHF transmission	United States	Faith, South Dakota		45°03′14.0″N 102°15′49″W
Spectra Site Communications Tower Orange City	516.6 m (1,695 ft)	1984	Guyed mast	VHF-UHF transmission	United States	Orange City, Florida	Height reduced to 512.7 metres	28°55′11.1″N 81°19′07″W
Christmas Brown Road Tower	516.6 m (1,695 ft)	2001	Guyed mast	VHF-UHF transmission	United States	Christmas, Florida		28°36′36.0″N 81°03′34.0″W
Gray Television Tower Madill	516.3 m (1,694 ft)	1984	Guyed mast	VHF-UHF transmission	United States	Madill, Oklahoma		34°01′58.0″N 96°48′01″W
American Tower Christmas	513.3 m (1,684 ft)	2001	Guyed mast	VHF-UHF transmission	United States	Christmas, Florida		28°34′53.0″N 81°04′29″W
Richland Towers Bithlo	512.7 m (1,682 ft)	2002	Guyed mast	VHF-UHF transmission	United States	Bithlo, Florida		28°35′12.6″N 81°04′57.5″W
Northland Television Tower Rhinelander	512.6 m (1,682 ft)	1979	Guyed mast	VHF-UHF transmission	United States	Rhinelander, Wisconsin		45°40′03.0″N 89°12′29″W
Benguela-Belize Lobito-Tomboco Platform	512 m (1,680 ft)	2008	Offshore platform	Oil drilling	Angola Exclusive Economic Zone	lower Congo Basin		5.4167°S 11.2167°E
Gray Television Tower Moody	511.8 m (1,679 ft)	1978	Guyed mast	VHF-UHF transmission	United States	Moody, Texas		31°19′20.0″N 97°19′03″W
KFVS TV Mast	511.1 m (1,677 ft)	1960	Guyed mast	VHF-UHF transmission	United States	Cape Girardeau County, Missouri	Tallest structure in the world 1960–1961	37°25′44.5″N 89°30′13.84″W
Taipei 101	509.2 m (1,671 ft)	2004	Skyscraper	Office, observation, VHF-UHF transmission	Taiwan	Taipei	Tallest building in the world 2004–2007	25°02′01″N 121°33′52″E
Cox Radio Tower Verna	508.1 m (1,667 ft)	1994	Guyed mast	VHF-UHF transmission	United States	Verna, Florida		27°24′31.2″N 82°14′59.3″W
WMTW TV Mast	508.1 m (1,667 ft)	2001	Guyed mast	VHF-UHF transmission	United States	Baldwin, Maine		43°50′44.0″N 70°45′41″W
American Towers Tower Cedar Hill	506.2 m (1,661 ft)	1999	Guyed mast	VHF-UHF transmission	United States	Cedar Hill, Texas		32°35′20.0″N 96°58′05.9″W
American Towers Tower Oklahoma City	502 m (1,647 ft)	1999	Guyed mast	VHF-UHF transmission	United States	Oklahoma City, Oklahoma		35°35′52.1″N 97°29′23.2″W
153 Richland Towers Tower Cedar Hill 2	498.4 m (1,635 ft)	2000	Guyed mast	UHF/VHF-transmission	United States	Cedar Hill, Texas		32°32′36.0″N 96°57′33″W
155 WWRR Renda Tower	497 m (1,631 ft)	1987	Guyed mast	UHF/VHF-transmission	United States	Kingsland, Georgia		30°49′17.0″N 81°44′13″W
156 QueenB Television Tower	496 m (1,627 ft)	1964	Guyed mast	UHF/VHF-transmission	United States	Galesville, Wisconsin	Height reduced to 484.3 metres	44°05′28.0″N 91°20′17″W
157 KDEB Tower	496 m (1,627 ft)	1968	Guyed mast	UHF/VHF-transmission	United States	Fordland, Missouri	also known as American Towers Tower Fordland, dismantled	37°11′41.0″N 92°56′08″W
WPSD-TV Tower	495.9 m (1,627 ft)	2004	Guyed mast	UHF/VHF-transmission	United States	Kevil, Kentucky		37°11′31.2″N 88°58′53.2″W
NVG-Amarillo Tower	495.6 m (1,626 ft)	1969	Guyed mast	UHF/VHF-transmission	United States	Amarillo, Texas	KACV-TV, KVII-TV	35°22′30.0″N 101°52′58″W
WGME TV Tower	495 m (1,624 ft)	1959	Guyed mast	UHF/VHF-transmission	United States	Raymond, Maine	World's tallest structure, 1959–1960	43°55′28.43″N 70°29′26.72″W
Sinclair Television Tower Oklahoma	493.5 m (1,619 ft)	1979	Guyed mast	UHF/VHF-transmission	United States	Oklahoma City, Oklahoma		35°32′58.2″N 97°29′19.1″W
Shanghai World Financial Center	492 m (1,614 ft)	2008	Skyscraper	Office, hotels, residential	China	Shanghai		31°14′12″N 121°30′10″E
Umm Qasr TV Mast	492 m (1,614 ft)	?	Guyed mast	UHF/VHF-transmission	Iraq	Umm Qasr		30°03′34.37″N 47°53′14.52″E
WJJY TV Mast	491 m (1,611 ft)	1969	Guyed mast	UHF/VHF-transmission	United States	Bluffs, Illinois	collapsed in 1978	39°45′51″N 90°30′55″W
Media General Tower Jackson	491 m (1,611 ft)	1989	Guyed mast	UHF/VHF-transmission	United States	Jackson, Mississippi		32°14′27.0″N 90°24′15″W
WHNS TV-Tower	491 m (1,611 ft)	2001	Guyed mast	UHF/VHF-transmission	United States	Brevard, North Carolina		35°10′56.0″N 82°40′55.0″W
KOBR-TV Tower	490.7 m (1,610 ft)	1956	Guyed mast	UHF/VHF-transmission	United States	Caprock, New Mexico	also known as KSWS-TV Transmitter, World's tallest structure, 1956–1959, collapsed in 1960 at storm, rebuilt afterwards	33°22′31.31″N 103°46′14.3″W
Joint Venture TV Tower Bithlo	490.2 m (1,608 ft)	1992	Guyed mast	UHF/VHF-transmission	United States	Bithlo, Florida		28°33′55.0″N 81°03′13″W
American Towers Tower Bithlo	489.5 m (1,605 ft)	1984	Guyed mast	UHF/VHF-transmission	United States	Bithlo, Florida		28°34′51.9″N 81°04′31.2″W
Local TV Oklahoma Tower	488.3 m (1,601 ft)	1965	Guyed mast	UHF/VHF-transmission	United States	Oklahoma City, Oklahoma	also known as WKY TV Mast	
WCOM-TV Mansfield, Ohio	488 m (1,601 ft)	1988	Guyed mast	UHF/VHF-transmission	United States	Butler, Ohio	Was the tallest structure in Ohio until it was dismantled in 1995	40°35′20.0″N 82°25′32″W 35°34′07.0″N 97°29′21″W
Clear Channel Broadcasting Tower Boykin	487.8 m (1,600 ft)	1997	Guyed mast	UHF/VHF-transmission	United States	Boykin, Georgia		31°09′12.7″N 84°32′38.3″W
WVFJ Tower Saint Marks	487.7 m (1,600 ft)	1998	Guyed mast	UHF/VHF-transmission	United States	Saint Marks, Georgia		33°05′05.0″N 84°46′12″W
Paramount Tower Oklahoma	486.4 m (1,596 ft)	1980	Guyed mast	UHF/VHF-transmission	United States	Oklahoma City, Oklahoma	Dismantled in 2011	35°35′22.0″N 97°29′03″W
WTVA TV Tower	485.5 m (1,593 ft)	1972	Guyed mast	UHF/VHF-transmission	United States	Woodland, Mississippi		33°47′40.0″N 89°05′16″W
KTVT Tower	483.7 m (1,587 ft)	2002	Guyed mast	UHF/VHF-transmission	United States	Cedar Hill, Texas		32°34′43.5″N 96°57′13″W
GBC LP DBA Tower	482.2 m (1,582 ft)	1997	Guyed mast	UHF/VHF-transmission	United States	Cedar Hill, Texas	dismantled	32°34′43.0″N 96°57′13″W
WLFL Tower Apex	481.3 m (1,579 ft)	1986	Guyed mast	UHF/VHF-transmission	United States	Apex, North Carolina		35°42′51.0″N 78°49′03″W
WFAA Tower	481 m (1,578 ft)	1998	Guyed mast	UHF/VHF-transmission	United States	Cedar Hill, Texas		32°35′06.0″N 96°58′42″W
Griffin Television Tower Oklahoma	480.5 m (1,576 ft)	1954	Guyed mast	UHF/VHF-transmission	United States	Oklahoma City, Oklahoma	also known as KWTV Tower, World's tallest structure, 1954–1956, Dismantled in 2015	35°32′58.59″N 97°29′50.27″W
Viacom Tower Riverview	480 m (1,575 ft)	1998	Guyed mast	UHF/VHF-transmission	United States	Riverview, Florida		27°49′47.0″N 82°15′58″W
Tampa Tower General Partnership Tower Riverview	479.4 m (1,573 ft)	1987	Guyed mast	UHF/VHF-transmission	United States	Riverview, Florida		27°50′33.0″N 82°15′44″W
Riverview Florida West Coast Public Broadcasting Tower	479.1 m (1,572 ft)	1999	Guyed mast	UHF/VHF-transmission	United States	Riverview, Florida		27°50′51.5″N 82°15′49.4″W
American Towers Tower Riverview	478 m (1,568 ft)	2001	Guyed mast	UHF/VHF-transmission	United States	Riverview, Florida		27°49′10.8″N 82°15′38″W
KBSI TV Mast	477.6 m (1,567 ft)	1983	Guyed mast	UHF/VHF-transmission	United States	Cape Girardeau, Missouri		37°24′23.0″N 89°33′44″W
Media General Tower Saint Ansgar	477.1 m (1,565 ft)	1964	Guyed mast	UHF/VHF-transmission	United States	Saint Ansgar, Iowa		43°22′20.0″N 92°50′00″W
Red River Broadcast Tower Salem	477 m (1,565 ft)	1976	Guyed mast	UHF/VHF-transmission	United States	Salem, South Dakota		43°37′56.0″N 97°22′25″W
Hearst-Argyle Television Tower	476.4 m (1,563 ft)	1963	Guyed mast	UHF/VHF-transmission	United States	Oklahoma City, Oklahoma		35°33′45.0″N 97°29′25″W
Augusta Tower	475.6 m (1,561 ft)	2003	Guyed mast	UHF/VHF-transmission	United States	Jackson, South Carolina		33°24′20.7″N 81°50′00.5″W
WAGT TV Tower	475.5 m (1,560 ft)	1985	Guyed mast	UHF/VHF-transmission	United States	Beech Island, South Carolina		33°25′17.0″N 81°50′18″W
KPLX Tower	475.1 m (1,559 ft)	1969	Guyed mast	UHF/VHF-transmission	United States	Cedar Hill, Texas		32°34′54.0″N 96°58′33″W
KTAL TV Tower	474.9 m (1,558 ft)	1961	Guyed mast	UHF/VHF-transmission	United States	Vivian, Louisiana		32°54′11″N 94°00′20″W
Mississippi Authority for Educational Television Tower	474.9 m (1,558 ft)	2000	Guyed mast	UHF/VHF-transmission	United States	Raymond, Mississippi		32°11′30.0″N 90°24′22″W
KRRT TV Tower	473.3 m (1,553 ft)	1985	Guyed mast	UHF/VHF-transmission	United States	Lake Hills, Texas		29°36′38.8″N 98°53′34.1″W
Hearst-Argyle Tower Watsonville	473.1 m (1,552 ft)	1984	Guyed mast	UHF/VHF-transmission	United States	Watsonville, California		37°03′28.0″N 121°46′34″W
Media General Tower Forest Hill	473 m (1,552 ft)	1965	Guyed mast	UHF/VHF-transmission	United States	Forest Hill, Louisiana		31°02′16.0″N 92°29′45″W
WVAH Tower	473 m (1,552 ft)	1980	Guyed mast	UHF/VHF-transmission	United States	Scott Depot, West Virginia	destroyed on 19 February 2003	38°25′15.0″N 81°55′26.0″W
American Towers Tower Cedar Hill 2	472.7 m (1,551 ft)	1980	Guyed mast	UHF/VHF-transmission	United States	Cedar Hill, Texas		32°35′22.0″N 96°58′12.9″W
KXTV/KOVR/KCRA Tower	472.1 m (1,549 ft)	1962	Guyed mast	UHF/VHF-transmission	United States	Walnut Grove, California		38°14′50.0″N 121°30′07″W
SpectraSite Tower Holopaw	472.1 m (1,549 ft)	1997	Guyed mast	UHF/VHF-transmission	United States	Holopaw, Florida		28°05′38.0″N 81°07′27″W
Troll A platform	472 m (1,549 ft)	1996	Offshore platform	Oil drilling	Norway	North Sea		
Central Park Tower	472 m (1,550 ft)	2020	Skyscraper	Residential, retail	United States	New York City	World's tallest residential building	40.7663°N 73.9810°W
Large masts of INS Kattabomman	471 m (1,545 ft)	2014	Guyed mast	VLF-transmission	India	Tirunelveli, Tamil Nadu		8°22′42.52″N 77°44′38.45″E; 8°22′30.13″N 77°45′21.07″E
Landmark 81	470 m (1,540 ft)	2018	Skyscraper	Hotel, residential, observation	Vietnam	Ho Chi Minh City		
Morris Tower Perkston	469.4 m (1,540 ft)	1986	Guyed mast	UHF/VHF-transmission	United States	Perkston, Mississippi		30°44′49.0″N 89°03′30″W
Capstar Radio Tower Mooresville	469.2 m (1,539 ft)	1986	Guyed mast	UHF/VHF-transmission	United States	Mooresville, North Carolina		35°31′57.0″N 80°47′46″W
Mississippi Authority for Educational TV Tower Mchenry	469 m (1,539 ft)	2003	Guyed mast	UHF/VHF-transmission	United States	McHenry, Mississippi		30°45′19.0″N 88°56′44″W
Holiday Pacific and Southern Tower	468.7 m (1,538 ft)	1969	Guyed mast	UHF/VHF-transmission	United States	Holiday, Florida	Dismantled in 2012	28°11′05.0″N 82°45′38″W
KXAS TV Tower	468.4 m (1,537 ft)	1989	Guyed mast	UHF/VHF-transmission	United States	Cedar Hill, Texas		32°35′15.0″N 96°58′00″W
KXTX TV Tower	468 m (1,535 ft)	1997	Guyed mast	UHF/VHF-transmission	United States	Cedar Hill, Texas		32°35′07.0″N 96°58′07″W
Qurayyat Transmitter, Mast 1	468 m (1,535 ft)	?	Guyed mast	UHF/VHF-transmission?	Saudi Arabia	Qurayyat		31°35′09.66″N 37°54′01.32″E
Oriental Pearl Tower	467.9 m (1,535 ft)	1994	Concrete tower	Observation, UHF/VHF-transmission	China	Shanghai		31°14′30″N 121°29′42″E
Richland Towers Tower Lonsdale	467.6 m (1,534 ft)	2003	Guyed mast	UHF/VHF-transmission	United States	Knoxville, Tennessee		35°59′44.4″N 83°57′23.1″W
WFLX Channel 29 Tower	467.2 m (1,533 ft)	1982	Guyed mast	UHF/VHF-transmission	United States	Green Acres, Florida		26°34′38.0″N 80°14′31″W
Lewis JR Tower 1	467 m (1,532 ft)	1990	Guyed mast	UHF/VHF-transmission	United States	Bloomingdale, Georgia		32°02′46.0″N 81°20′26″W
WTOC TV Tower	466.6 m (1,531 ft)	1974	Guyed mast	UHF/VHF-transmission	United States	Savannah, Georgia		32°03′35.9″N 81°20′42″W
Outlet Broadcasting Tower	466.5 m (1,531 ft)	1987	Guyed mast	UHF/VHF-transmission	United States	Clayton, North Carolina	Dismantled in 2012	35°37′00.0″N 78°28′22″W
Ime Media Tower	466.3 m (1,530 ft)	1997	Guyed mast	UHF/VHF-transmission	United States	Mullins, South Carolina		34°11′20.0″N 79°10′59″W
WFXB TV FOX 43 Tower	466.3 m (1,530 ft)	1997	Guyed mast	UHF/VHF-transmission	United States	Mullins, South Carolina		
Texas Tall Tower Elmendorf 2	466.3 m (1,530 ft)	2001	Guyed mast	UHF/VHF-transmission	United States	Elmendorf, Texas		29°16′11.5″N 98°15′55.9″W
Outlet Communications Tower Clayton	466 m (1,529 ft)	1987	Guyed mast	UHF/VHF-transmission	United States	Clayton, North Carolina	Dismantled in 2012	35°37′02.0″N 78°28′37″W
WXTB TV-Tower	466 m (1,529 ft)	2009	Guyed mast	UHF/VHF-transmission	United States	Holiday, Florida		28°10′57.0″N 82°46′05.3″W
WIS TV Tower	465.1 m (1,526 ft)	1958	Guyed mast	UHF/VHF-transmission	United States	Lugoff, South Carolina		34°07′30.0″N 80°45′22″W
Raycom America Tower Huntsville	465.1 m (1,526 ft)	1982	Guyed mast	UHF/VHF-transmission	United States	Huntsville, Alabama		34°42′39.3″N 86°32′07″W
Texas Tall Tower Elmendorf	464.5 m (1,524 ft)	1958	Guyed mast	UHF/VHF-transmission	United States	Elmendorf, Texas		29°16′11.0″N 98°15′56″W
Nebraska Education Tower Bassett	464.4 m (1,524 ft)	1987	Guyed mast	UHF/VHF-transmission	United States	Bassett, Nebraska		42°20′05.0″N 99°29′03″W
BREN Tower	464 m (1,523 ft)	1962	Guyed mast	Nuclear science	United States	Jackass Flats, Nevada	Dismantled in May 2012	36°46′50.23″N 116°14′36.9″W
Channel 34 TV Tower Palm City	463.5 m (1,521 ft)	1981	Guyed mast	UHF/VHF-transmission	United States	Palm City, Florida		27°07′20.0″N 80°23′19″W
WPBF Tower Martin County	463.4 m (1,520 ft)	1988	Guyed mast	UHF/VHF-transmission	United States	Martin County, Florida		27°07′19.0″N 80°23′41″W
WPBF Tower Martin County	463.3 m (1,520 ft)	1988	Guyed mast	UHF/VHF-transmission	United States	Martin County, Florida		27°07′18.0″N 80°23′40″W
Fort Myers Broadcasting Tower Punta Gorda	463 m (1,519 ft)	1988	Guyed mast	UHF/VHF-transmission	United States	Punta Gorda, Florida		26°48′02.2″N 81°45′47.3″W
Second Generation of Iowa Tower Van Horne	463 m (1,519 ft)	1996	Guyed mast	UHF/VHF-transmission	United States	Van Horne, Iowa		42°05′25.0″N 92°05′14″W
Telemundo Tower San Antonio	462.5 m (1,517 ft)	1989	Guyed mast	UHF/VHF-transmission	United States	Elmendorf, Texas		29°17′39.0″N 98°15′32″W
Lakhta Center	462.5 m (1,517 ft)	2019	Skyscraper	Office	Russia	Saint-Petersburg	Russia's tallest building since 2019.	
WBBH TV Tower Tuckers Corner	462.1 m (1,516 ft)	1980	Guyed mast	UHF/VHF-transmission	United States	Tuckers Corner, Florida		26°49′31.0″N 81°45′54″W
Waterman Broadcasting Tower Punta Gorda	462.1 m (1,516 ft)	2002	Guyed mast	UHF/VHF-transmission	United States	Punta Gorda, Florida		26°49′22.4″N 81°45′53.6″W
Taymylyr CHAYKA-Mast	462 m (1,516 ft)	?	Guyed Mast	LF-transmission	Russia	Taymylyr	demolished on 24 September 2009 by explosives	72°34′49.04″N 122°6′42.3″E
Dudinka CHAYKA-Mast	462 m (1,516 ft)	?	Guyed Mast	LF-transmission	Russia	Dudinka		69°21′45″N 86°41′49″E
American Towers Tower Punta Gorda	461.8 m (1,515 ft)	2002	Guyed mast	UHF/VHF-transmission	United States	Punta Gorda, Florida		26°47′08.7″N 81°47′45.9″W
Tichenor Tower	461.5 m (1,514 ft)	?	Guyed mast	UHF/VHF-transmission	United States	Elmendorf, Texas	Tower is built, although according to FCC-list declared as granted	29°16′31″N 98°15′55″W
Viacom Communications Tower Duette	461.3 m (1,513 ft)	2000	Guyed mast	UHF/VHF-transmission	United States	Duette, Florida		27°40′24.0″N 82°06′34″W
KPLC TV Tower Fenton	460 m (1,509 ft)	1966	Guyed mast	UHF/VHF-transmission	United States	Fenton, Louisiana		30°23′46.7″N 93°00′03.5″W
Inta CHAYKA-Mast	460 m (1,509 ft)	?	Guyed Mast	LF-transmission	Russia	Inta		65°57′59.54″N 60°18′33.45″E
Emmis TV Tower Rural	459.5 m (1,508 ft)	1987	Guyed mast	UHF/VHF-transmission	United States	Rural, Florida		26°47′43.0″N 81°48′04″W
Post Newsweek Stations San Antonio Tower	459.3 m (1,507 ft)	1962	Guyed mast	UHF/VHF-transmission	United States	Elmendorf, Texas		29°16′12.0″N 98°15′32″W
Iowa Public TV Tower Hancock	459.3 m (1,507 ft)	1975	Guyed mast	UHF/VHF-transmission	United States	Hancock, Iowa		41°20′39.0″N 95°15′22″W
Gray TV Tower Beech Island	459 m (1,506 ft)	1973	Guyed mast	UHF/VHF-transmission	United States	Beech Island, South Carolina		33°24′37.0″N 81°50′36″W
KPXM Tower	458.72 m (1,505 ft)	1997	Guyed mast	UHF/VHF-transmission	United States	Big Lake, Minnesota	tallest structure in Minnesota	45°22′59.6″N 93°42′30.9″W
Gannett Pacific Tower Knoxville	458.4 m (1,504 ft)	1980	Guyed mast	UHF/VHF-transmission	United States	Knoxville, Tennessee		36°00′19.0″N 83°56′23″W
KABB Tower	458.1 m (1,503 ft)	1987	Guyed mast	UHF/VHF-transmission	United States	Elmendorf, Texas		29°17′29.0″N 98°16′13″W
VLF transmitter Lualualei	458 m (1,503 ft)	1972	Guyed mast	VLF-transmission	United States	Lualualei, Hawaii	Since collapse of Warsaw Radio Mast, world's tallest structure insulated against ground	21°25′11.87″N 158°08′53.67″W; 21°25′13.38″N 158°09′14.35″W
Qurayyat Transmitter, Mast 2	458 m (1,503 ft)	?	Guyed mast	UHF/VHF-transmission?	Saudi Arabia	Qurayyat		31°35′01.03″N 37°54′14.23″E
Mercury Broadcasting Tower Cool Springs	457.8 m (1,502 ft)	1988	Guyed mast	UHF/VHF-transmission	United States	Cool Springs, North Carolina		35°50′00.0″N 80°42′15″W
KWCH 12 Tower	457.5 m (1,500 ft)	1963	Guyed mast	UHF/VHF-transmission	United States	east of Hutchinson, Kansas	also known as KWCH Tower	38°03′38.0″N 97°45′50″W
Clear Channel Broadcasting Tower Elsanor	457.5 m (1,501 ft)	2002	Guyed mast	UHF/VHF-transmission	United States	Elsanor, Alabama		30°35′16.7″N 87°33′12.7″W
Capstar Radio Tower Alexis	457.4 m (1,501 ft)	1987	Guyed mast	UHF/VHF-transmission	United States	Alexis, North Carolina		35°24′26.0″N 81°07′47″W
875 North Michigan Avenue	457.2 m (1,500 ft)	1969	Skyscraper	Office, observation, UHF/VHF-transmission	United States	Chicago, Illinois		
KLST TV Tower	457.2 m (1,500 ft)	1981	Guyed mast	UHF/VHF-transmission	United States	Eola, Texas		31°22′02.0″N 100°02′49″W
Gray TV Tower Beaver Crossing	457.2 m (1,500 ft)	1984	Guyed mast	UHF/VHF-transmission	United States	Beaver Crossing, Nebraska		40°48′11.0″N 97°10′53″W
Rosston Liberman Broadcasting Tower	457.2 m (1,500 ft)	2007	Guyed mast	UHF/VHF-transmission	United States	Rosston, Texas		33°31′38.4″N 97°24′55.1″W
Cox Radio Tower Eutis	457 m (1,499 ft)	1987	Guyed mast	UHF/VHF-transmission	United States	Eutis, Florida		28°58′48.0″N 81°27′19″W
SpectraSite Tower Bandera	457 m (1,499 ft)	1999	Guyed mast	UHF/VHF-transmission	United States	Bandera, Texas		29°37′12.0″N 99°02′57.1″W
Kimtron Tower Loretto	457 m (1,499 ft)	1996	Guyed mast	UHF/VHF-transmission	United States	Loretto, Alabama		34°04′56.6″N 86°54′14.8″W
Nebraska Education Tower Angora	456.9 m (1,499 ft)	1966	Guyed mast	UHF/VHF-transmission	United States	Angora, Nebraska	collapsed in February 1978	41°50′27.0″N 103°03′20″W
State of Wisconsin Tower Park Falls	456.9 m (1,499 ft)	1977	Guyed mast	UHF/VHF-transmission	United States	Park Falls, Wisconsin		45°56′42.5″N 90°16′22.5″W
American Towers Tower Amarillo 2	456.9 m (1,499 ft)	1987	Guyed mast	UHF/VHF-transmission	United States	Amarillo, Texas	KAMR-TV, KCIT-TV	35°20′33.1″N 101°49′21.2″W
Panhandle Telecasting Tower Amarillo	456 m (1,496 ft)	1981	Guyed mast	UHF/VHF-transmission	United States	Amarillo, Texas	KFDA-TV, others	35°17′34.0″N 101°50′44″W
Pinnacle Towers Tower La Feria	454.8 m (1,492 ft)	1981	Guyed mast	UHF/VHF-transmission	United States	La Feria, Texas	dismantled	26°06′02.0″N 97°50′19″W
Pinnacle Towers Tower Santa Maria	454.5 m (1,491 ft)	2001	Guyed mast	UHF/VHF-transmission	United States	Santa Maria, Texas		26°06′02.3″N 97°50′21.5″W
The Exchange 106	453.6 m (1,461 ft)	2019	Skyscraper	Office	Malaysia	Kuala Lumpur		3.14200°N 101.71873°E
KQID TV Tower	453.1 m (1,487 ft)	1986	Guyed mast	UHF/VHF-transmission	United States	Jena, Louisiana		31°38′21.0″N 92°12′19″W
Petronas Tower 1	451.9 m (1,483 ft)	1998	Skyscraper	Office, observation	Malaysia	Kuala Lumpur	Tallest twin towers in the world	3°09′27.45″N 101°42′40.7″E
Petronas Tower 2	451.9 m (1,483 ft)	1998	Skyscraper	Office, observation	Malaysia	Kuala Lumpur	Tallest twin towers in the world	3°09′29.45″N 101°42′43.4″E
Lewis JR Tower 2	451 m (1,479 ft)	1989	Guyed mast	UHF/VHF-transmission	United States	Bloomingdale, Georgia		32°03′30.0″N 81°20′18″W
Media General Tower Bloomingdale	450.8 m (1,479 ft)	1976	Guyed mast	UHF/VHF-transmission	United States	Bloomingdale, Georgia		32°03′31.7″N 81°17′54.4″W
Saga Communications Tower Alleman	450.8 m (1,479 ft)	2003	Guyed mast	UHF/VHF-transmission	United States	Alleman, Iowa		41°48′01.0″N 93°36′28″W
Duhamel Broadcasting Tower Angora	450.5 m (1,478 ft)	2003	Guyed mast	UHF/VHF-transmission	United States	Angora, Nebraska	also known as KDUH TV/DT	41°50′27.9″N 103°04′28.8″W
Masts of Mokpo VLF transmitter	450 m (1,476 ft)	2006	Guyed mast	VLF-transmission	South Korea	Mokpo		34°40′57.6″N 126°26′49.01″E; 34°40′31.73″N 126°26′37.45″E
Zifeng Tower	450 m (1,476 ft)	2009	Skyscraper	Mixed-use	China	Nanjing		
WOFL-TV35 Tower Bithlo	449 m (1,473 ft)	1973	Guyed mast	UHF/VHF-transmission	United States	Bithlo, Florida		28°36′14.0″N 81°05′10″W
Blue Ridge Tower Missouri City	449 m (1,473 ft)	1995	Guyed mast	UHF/VHF-transmission	United States	Missouri City, Texas		29°33′26.0″N 95°30′05″W
Empire State Building	448.7 m (1,472 ft)	1931	Skyscraper	Office, observation, UHF/VHF-transmission	United States	New York City, New York	World's tallest structure, 1931–1954	40°44′54.0″N 73°59′09″W
Pinnacle Towers Mount Selman	447 m (1,467 ft)	1986	Guyed mast	UHF/VHF-transmission	United States	Mount Selman, Texas	KETK-TV, KOOI-FM	32°03′41.0″N 95°18′51″W
KMSP TV Tower	446.8 m (1,466 ft)	1971	Guyed mast	UHF/VHF-transmission	United States	Shoreview, Minnesota	tallest structure in Minnesota until 1997	45°03′30.0″N 93°07′28″W
Media General Operations Tower Youngstown	446.7 m (1,466 ft)	1990	Guyed mast	UHF/VHF-transmission	United States	Mount Selman, Texas		
KLKN TV-Tower	446.5 m (1,465 ft)	1993	Guyed mast	UHF/VHF-transmission	United States	Utica, Nebraska		40°52′59.0″N 97°18′20″W
WCES TV Tower	446 m (1,463 ft)	1966	Guyed mast	UHF/VHF-transmission	United States	Wrens, Georgia		33°15′34.0″N 82°17′08″W
WTVT Tower Balm	446 m (1,463 ft)	1998	Guyed mast	UHF/VHF-transmission	United States	Balm, Florida		27°49′09.0″N 82°14′25″W
New World Communications Tower Riverview	445.9 m (1,463 ft)	1976	Guyed mast	UHF/VHF-transmission	United States	Riverview, Florida	Demolished in 2012	27°49′09.0″N 82°14′25″W
WDAZ TV Tower	445.1 m (1,460 ft)	1974	Guyed mast	UHF/VHF-transmission	United States	Dahlen, North Dakota		48°08′18.0″N 97°59′36″W
KTEN TV-Tower Bromide	444.5 m (1,458 ft)	1984	Guyed mast	UHF/VHF-transmission	United States	Bromide, Oklahoma		34°21′34.0″N 96°33′35″W
WICS-TV Tower Mechanicsburg	444.5 m (1,458 ft)	1986	Guyed mast	UHF/VHF-transmission	United States	Mechanicsburg, Illinois		39°48′15.0″N 89°27′40″W
SpectraSite Tower Knoxville	444.2 m (1,457 ft)	1955	Guyed mast	UHF/VHF-transmission	United States	Knoxville, Tennessee		36°00′12.8″N 83°56′34″W
KM TV Tower	443.8 m (1,456 ft)	1999	Guyed mast	UHF/VHF-transmission	United States	West Branch, Iowa		41°43′29.2″N 91°21′10.2″W
KK100	441.8 m (1,449 ft)	2011	Skyscraper	Mixed use	China	Shenzhen		22°32′47.58″N 114°6′6.63″E
Springfield Independent TV Tower	441.7 m (1,449 ft)	1984	Guyed mast	UHF/VHF-transmission	United States	Mechanicsburg, Illinois		39°47′56.8″N 89°26′46.1″W
Iowa Public TV Tower West Branch	441.7 m (1,449 ft)	1997	Guyed mast	UHF/VHF-transmission	United States	West Branch, Iowa		41°43′15.0″N 91°20′30″W
Sylvester Cumulus Broadcasting Tower	441.7 m (1449 ft)	2005	Guyed mast	UHF/VHF-transmission	United States	Sylvester, Texas		32°43′31″N 100°4′21″W
American Towers Tower Amarillo	441.4 m (1,449 ft)	1998	Guyed mast	UHF/VHF-transmission	United States	Amarillo, Texas		35°18′53.2″N 101°50′48.7″W
Guangzhou International Finance Center	440 m (1,444 ft)	2009	Skyscraper	Mixed use	China	Guangzhou		23°07′13″N 113°19′05″E
KTKA-TV Tower Topeka	438.7 m (1,439 ft)	1984	Guyed mast	UHF/VHF-transmission	United States	Topeka, Kansas	also known as Brechner Tower	39°01′34.0″N 95°55′02.0″W
KTXR Tower	438.4 m (1,438 ft)	2003	Guyed mast	UHF/VHF-transmission	United States	Fordland, Missouri		37°11′41.0″N 92°56′08″W
Telefarm Towers Shoreview	438.3 m (1,438 ft)	2001	Guyed mast	UHF/VHF-transmission	United States	Shoreview, Minnesota		45°03′45.0″N 93°08′22″W
Red River Broadcast Tower Pembina	438.2 m (1,438 ft)	1987	Guyed mast	UHF/VHF-transmission	United States	Pembina, North Dakota		48°59′44.0″N 97°24′29″W
WNWO Tower	438 m (1,437 ft)	1983	Guyed mast	UHF/VHF-transmission	United States	Jerusalem, Ohio		41°40′03.0″N 83°21′22″W
Telefarm Towers Shoreview	437.7 m (1,436 ft)	2000	Guyed mast	UHF/VHF-transmission	United States	Shoreview, Minnesota		45°03′44.0″N 93°08′22″W
SpectraSite Tower Youngstown	436.8 m (1,433 ft)	1976	Guyed mast	UHF/VHF-transmission	United States	Youngstown, Ohio	tallest structure in Ohio until 1983	41°03′23.4″N 80°38′43″W
Christholm Trail Broadcasting Tower Crescent	435.2 m (1,428 ft)	2000	Guyed mast	UHF/VHF-transmission	United States	Crescent, Oklahoma		35°58′50.0″N 97°41′43″W
Milad Tower	435 m (1,427 ft)	2003	Concrete tower	Observation, UHF/VHF-transmission	Iran	Tehran		35°44′40″N 51°22′30″E
111 West 57th Street	435 m (1,428 ft)	2020	Skyscraper	Residential	United States	New York City	Thinnest skyscraper in the world	40.76455°N 73.97765°W
Madison Candelabra Tower	433.7 m (1,423 ft)	1995	Guyed mast	UHF/VHF-transmission	United States	Madison, Wisconsin		43°03′21.0″N 89°32′06″W
VLF Transmitter Woodside	432 m (1,418 ft)	1982	Guyed mast	VLF-transmission	Australia	Woodside, Victoria	demolished on 22 April 2015	38°28′52.42″S 146°56′7.06″E
Burlington TV Tower Aledo	431.9 m (1,417 ft)	2000	Guyed mast	UHF/VHF-transmission	United States	Aledo, Illinois		41°08′08.0″N 90°48′30″W
University of North Carolina Tower Concord	431.6 m (1,416 ft)	1987	Guyed mast	UHF/VHF-transmission	United States	Concord, North Carolina		35°21′31.0″N 80°36′36″W
Concord Media Tower Molino	431 m (1,414 ft)	1997	Guyed mast	UHF/VHF-transmission	United States	Molina, Florida		30°42′21.0″N 87°24′12″W
International Commerce Centre	430 m (1,411 ft)	2009	Skyscraper	Office	ChinaHong Kong	Tsim Sha Tsui, Hong Kong		22°18′12″N 114°9′37″E
Chabrier Omega transmitter	428 m (1,404 ft)	1976	Guyed mast	VLF-transmission	France (Réunion)	Chabrier, Réunion	demolished on 14 April 1999	20°58′26.9″S 55°17′23.62″E
KXEL-Tower	427.7 m (1,403 ft)	1985	Guyed mast	UHF/VHF-transmission	United States	Walker City, Iowa		42°24′35.0″N 92°05′11″W
One Vanderbilt	427 m (1,401 ft)	2020	Skyscraper	Office, observation	United States	New York City		40.7530°N 73.9785°W
Camden County Paxson Communication Tower	426.7 m (1,400 ft)	2006	Guyed mast	UHF/VHF-transmission	United States	Camden County, Georgia		30°49′39.8″N 81°44′26.4″W
Moapa Entravision Tower	426.7 m (1,400 ft)	2008	Guyed mast	UHF/VHF-transmission	United States	Moapa, Nevada		36°36′3.5″N 114°35′09.1″W
Marina 101	426.5 m (1,399 ft)	2016	Skyscraper	Hotel and hotel apartments	United Arab Emirates	Dubai		22°05′22.23″N 55°08′56.12″E
432 Park Avenue	426 m (1,396 ft)	2015	Skyscraper	Residential	United States	New York City		40°45′40″N 73°58′17″W
Central Mast of Imeretinskaya VLF-transmitter	425 m (1,394 ft)	?	Guyed mast	VLF-transmission	Russia	Imeretinskaya		44°46′24.93″N 39°32′50.32″E
SpectraSite Tower Charlotte	424.6 m (1,393 ft)	1992	Guyed mast	UHF/VHF-transmission	United States	Charlotte, North Carolina	also known as SpectraSite Communications, Inc.	35°15′07.0″N 80°41′11″W
Capstar Radio Tower Middlesex	424.3 m (1,392 ft)	1984	Guyed mast	UHF/VHF-transmission	United States	Middlesex, North Carolina		35°45′37.0″N 78°11′03″W
Trump International Hotel and Tower	423.4 m (1,389 ft)	2009	Skyscraper	Hotel, condominium	United States	Chicago	World's tallest concrete formwork structure upon completion. Originally planned to be the world's tallest building in 2001.	41°53′20″N 87°37′36″W
JPMorgan Chase World Headquarters	423 m (1,388 ft)	2025	Skyscraper	Office	United States	New York City		40°45′21″N 73°58′31″W
KWQC TV Tower	421 m (1,381 ft)	1982	Guyed mast	UHF/VHF-transmission	United States	Bettendorf, Iowa		41°32′49.0″N 90°28′35″W
Kuala Lumpur Tower	421 m (1,381 ft)	1995	Concrete tower	Observation, UHF/VHF-transmission	Malaysia	Kuala Lumpur		03°09′10″N 101°42′12″E
Jin Mao Tower	420.5 m (1,380 ft)	1998	Skyscraper	Hotel, office, observation	China	Shanghai		31°14′14″N 121°30′05″E
GRES-2 Power Station Chimney	419.7 m (1,377 ft)	1987	Chimney	Power station	Kazakhstan	Ekibastusz	Tallest chimney in the world	52°1′26.3″N 75°28′34.5″E
KQQK Tower Hitchcock	419.1 m (1,375 ft)	1995	Guyed mast	UHF/VHF-transmission	United States	Hitchcock, Texas		29°18′01.0″N 95°06′40″W
Citicasters Tower Holiday	418.2 m (1,372 ft)	1996	Guyed mast	UHF/VHF-transmission	United States	Holiday, Florida		28°10′57.0″N 82°46′05″W
WSMV TV-Tower	417.4 m (1,369 ft)	1986	Guyed mast	UHF/VHF-transmission	United States	Nashville, Tennessee		36°08′27.0″N 86°51′56″W
KTFO TV-Tower Coweta	417 m (1,368 ft)	1981	Guyed mast	UHF/VHF-transmission	United States	Coweta, Oklahoma		36°01′10.0″N 95°39′25″W
Trinity Broadcasting Network Tower Oglesby	417 m (1,368 ft)	1985	Guyed mast	UHF/VHF-transmission	United States	Oglesby, Illinois		41°16′51.0″N 88°56′13″W
Ocala Broadcasting Tower	416.6 m (1,367 ft)	1986	Guyed mast	UHF/VHF-transmission	United States	Ocala, Florida		29°16′06.0″N 82°04′50″W
KETV TV Tower	416 m (1,365 ft)	2004	Guyed mast	UHF/VHF-transmission	United States	Omaha, Nebraska		41°18′32.0″N 96°01′34.2″W
Two International Finance Centre	415.8 m (1,348 ft)	2003	Skyscraper	Office	Hong Kong	Hong Kong		
2 World Trade Center	415.3 m (1,362 ft)	1973	Skyscraper	Office, observation	United States	New York City, New York	destroyed on 11 September 2001	40°42′43.0″N 74°00′48.0″W
Tianjin Radio and Television Tower	415.2 m (1,362 ft)	1991	Concrete tower	Observation, UHF/VHF-transmission	China	Tianjin		
KETV TV Tower (old)	415.1 m (1,362 ft)	1966	Guyed mast	UHF/VHF-transmission	United States	Omaha, Nebraska	collapsed in 2003	41°18′32.0″N 96°01′38″W
Al Hamra Tower	414 m (1,358 ft)	2012	Skyscraper	Mall, offices	Kuwait	Kuwait City	World's tallest curved concrete tower	29.379°N 47.9932°E
Tallahassee Broadcasting Tower	414 m (1,358 ft)	1993	Guyed mast	UHF/VHF-transmission	United States	Lloyd, Florida		30°27′10.0″N 84°00′50″W
KGAN-Tower	413.2 m (1,356 ft)	1983	Guyed mast	UHF/VHF-transmission	United States	Walker City, Iowa		42°17′43.0″N 91°53′11″W
Gufuskálar	412 m (1,352 ft)	1963	Guyed mast	LF-transmission	Iceland	Hellissandur	former LORAN-Tower, insulated against ground	64°54′26″N 23°55′20″W
ACME TV Tower	411.8 m (1,351 ft)	2001	Guyed mast	UHF/VHF-transmission	United States	Oreana, Illinois		39°56′56.0″N 88°50′12.9″W
Entercom Tower Morriston	411.8 m (1,351 ft)	1987	Guyed mast	UHF/VHF-transmission	United States	Morriston, Florida		29°15′35.0″N 82°34′04″W
Haeundae LCT The Sharp Landmark Tower	411.6 m (1,350 ft)	2019	Skyscraper	Hotel, residential	South Korea	Busan		35°09′35″N 129°09′23″E
Entravision Tower Boylston	411.5 m (1,350 ft)	2004	Guyed mast	UHF/VHF-transmission	United States	Boylston, Massachusetts		42°20′09.0″N 71°42′55″W
Angissq LORAN-C transmitter (old mast)	411.48 m (1,350 ft)	1963	Guyed mast	LF-transmission	DenmarkGreenland	Angissq	collapsed on 27 July 1964	59°59′18″N 45°10′24″W
Marcus Island LORAN-C transmitter (old mast)	411.48 m (1,350 ft)	1964	Guyed mast	LF-transmission	Japan	Markus Island	dismantled in 1985	24°17′08.79″N 153°58′52.2″E
Iwo Jima LORAN-C transmitter	411.48 m (1,350 ft)	1963/65	Guyed mast	LF-transmission	Japan	Iwo Jima	destroyed in 1965, afterwards rebuilt, rebuilt mast dismantled in 1993	24°48′08″N 141°19′32″E
Cape Race LORAN-C transmitter (old mast)	411.48 m (1,350 ft)	1965	Guyed mast	LF-transmission	Canada	Cape Race	collapsed on 2 February 1993	46°46′32″N 53°10′28″W
CKX-TV Craig Television Tower (old mast)	411.48 m (1,350 ft)	1973	Guyed mast	UHF-/VHF-transmission	Canada	Hayfield, Manitoba	collapsed 1983	49°40′05.73″N 100°00′42.25″W
CKX-TV Craig Television Tower	411.48 m (1,350 ft)	1985	Guyed mast	UHF-/VHF-transmission	Canada	Hayfield, Manitoba		49°40′05.73″N 100°00′42.25″W
LORAN-C transmitter Port Clarence	411.48 m (1,350 ft)	1961	Guyed mast	LF-transmission	United States	Port Clarence, Alaska	Tallest structure in Alaska, demolished on 28 April 2010	65°14′40″N 166°53′12″W
American Tower Newton	411.2 m (1,349 ft)	?	Guyed mast	UHF/VHF-transmission	United States	Newton, Massachusetts	dismantled	42°18′27.0″N 71°13′25″W
WKRR/WKZL Tower	410.6 m (1,347 ft)	1985	Guyed mast	UHF/VHF-transmission	United States	Randleman, North Carolina		35°50′00.0″N 79°50′01″W
Huntsville TV Tower	410.6 m (1,347 ft)	2000	Guyed mast	UHF/VHF-transmission	United States	Minor Hill, Tennessee		35°00′09.0″N 87°08′09″W
Emmis TV Tower Omaha	410.2 m (1,346 ft)	2004	Guyed mast	UHF/VHF-transmission	United States	Omaha, Nebraska	also known as Emmis Television License Corp. Tower	41°18′24.6″N 96°01′37.7″W
WOWT-TV Tower	409 m (1342 ft)	?	Guyed mast	UHF/VHF-transmission	United States	Omaha, Nebraska		41°18′39″N 96°1′37″W
WTIC Tower	408 m (1,339 ft)	1965	Guyed mast	UHF/VHF-transmission	United States	Farmington, Connecticut		41°42′13.0″N 72°49′55″W
WICD Tower	407.8 m (1,338 ft)	1995	Guyed mast	UHF/VHF-transmission	United States	Homer, Illinois		40°04′10.0″N 87°54′46″W
Tall Towers Tower La Feria	407.8 m (1,338 ft)	1987	Guyed mast	UHF/VHF-transmission	United States	La Feria, Texas		26°08′57.0″N 97°49′19″W
Spectrasite Communications Tower Frenchburg	407.3 m (1,336 ft)	2000	Guyed mast	UHF/VHF-transmission	United States	Frenchburg, Kentucky		37°54′26.6″N 83°38′01.1″W
CKX Television Tower	406.9 m (1 335 ft)	1972	Guyed mast	UHF/VHF-transmission	Canada	Brandon, Manitoba		49°40′6″N 100°0′41″W
Scripps Howard Broadcasting Tower Greenacres City	405.7 m (1,331 ft)	2003	Guyed mast	UHF/VHF-transmission	United States	Greenacres City, Florida		26°35′21.2″N 80°12′42.8″W
KLPA Television Tower	405 m (1,329 ft)	1983	Guyed mast	UHF/VHF-transmission	United States	Alexandria, Louisiana		31°33′57.0″N 92°32′51″W
Central Radio and TV Tower	405 m (1,329 ft)	1992	Concrete tower	Observation, UHF/VHF-transmission	China	Beijing		39°55′05″N 116°18′01″E
Cumulus Broadcasting Tower Rockvale	404.8 m (1,328 ft)	1991	Guyed mast	UHF/VHF-transmission	United States	Rockvale, Tennessee		35°49′03.0″N 86°31′24″W
South Dakota Public Broadcasting Tower Reliance	404.1 m (1,326 ft)	1970	Guyed mast	UHF/VHF-transmission	United States	Reliance, South Dakota		43°58′05.0″N 99°35′41″W
Clear Channel Broadcasting Tower Jernigantown	403.6 m (1,324 ft)	1990	Guyed mast	UHF/VHF-transmission	United States	Jernigantown, Tennessee		36°31′36.0″N 86°41′14″W
Sand Springs Scripps Howard Broadcasting Tower	403.5 m (1324 ft)	1954	Guyed mast	UHF/VHF-transmission	United States	Sand Springs, Oklahoma	was originally 358.4 metres tall	36°11′46″N 96°5′53″W
WEYI TV25 Flint Tower	403.2 m (1,323 ft)	1972	Guyed mast	UHF/VHF-transmission	United States	Clio, Michigan	Tallest structure above ground level in Michigan	43°13′01.0″N 83°43′17″W
Cossitt Library Dba Tower	402.4 m (1,320 ft)	1989	Guyed mast	UHF/VHF-transmission	United States	Frenchman's Bayou, Arkansas		35°28′03.0″N 90°11′27″W
WLOX TV Tower	402.1 m (1,319 ft)	1964	Guyed mast	UHF/VHF-transmission	United States	McHenry, Mississippi		30°43′23.0″N 89°05′28″W
Southwest TV Tower Lunita	402 m (1,319 ft)	1989	Guyed mast	UHF/VHF-transmission	United States	Lunita, Louisiana		30°17′27.0″N 93°34′36″W
Mississippi Authority for Educational TV Tower Oxford	402 m (1,319 ft)	1998	Guyed mast	UHF/VHF-transmission	United States	Oxford, Mississippi		34°17′28.0″N 89°42′21″W
South Carolina Educational TV Tower	401.7 m (1,318 ft)	1975	Guyed mast	UHF/VHF-transmission	United States	Green Pond, South Carolina	dismantled	
WJWJ TV Tower	401.6 m (1,318 ft)	1975	Guyed mast	UHF/VHF-transmission	United States	Beaufort, South Carolina		32°42′42.5″N 80°40′53.8″W
Beaufort WHK-291 Tower	401.6 m (1,318 ft)	1985	Guyed mast	UHF/VHF-transmission	United States	Beaufort, South Carolina		32°42′43.0″N 80°40′53.0″W
Moapa Kemp Tower	401 m (1,316 ft)	?	Guyed mast	UHF/VHF-transmission	United States	Moapa, Nevada	built, although FCC mention it as granted	36°35′05″N 114°36′03″W
Lewis Broadcasting Tower Columbus	400.9 m (1,315 ft)	1982	Guyed mast	UHF/VHF-transmission	United States	Columbus, Georgia		32°27′29.0″N 84°53′08″W
KTTC-TV Tower	400.5 m (1,314 ft)	1960	Guyed mast	UHF/VHF-transmission	United States	Ostrander, Minnesota	analog	43°34′15.0″N 92°25′38″W
Wand TV Tower Decatur	400.5 m (1,314 ft)	?	Guyed mast	UHF/VHF-transmission	United States	Decatur, Illinois	collapsed on 26 March 1978	
Wand TV Tower	400.5 m (1,314 ft)	1980	Guyed mast	UHF/VHF-transmission	United States	Argenta, Illinois		39°57′07.0″N 88°49′55″W
Dimona Radar Facility	400 m (1,312 ft)	2008	Guyed mast	UHF/VHF-transmission	Israel	Dimona	2 units	
South Dakota analog TV Tower	399.1 m (1,309 ft)	1962	Guyed mast	UHF/VHF-transmission	United States	Crocker, South Dakota	dismantled	45°06′23.0″N 97°53′58″W
KXAN TV Tower (Old)	398.8 m (1,308 ft)	1964	Guyed mast	UHF/VHF-transmission	United States	Austin, Texas	dismantled	30°19′08.0″N 97°48′05″W
KXAN TV Tower	398.8 m (1,308 ft)	1996	Guyed mast	UHF/VHF-transmission	United States	Austin, Texas		30°19′11″N 97°48′09″W
University of North Carolina Tower Chapel Hill	398.4 m (1,307 ft)	1991	Guyed mast	UHF/VHF-transmission	United States	Chapel Hill, North Carolina		35°52′00.0″N 79°09′59″W
Sinclair Radio Tower	397.8 m (1,305 ft)	1987	Guyed mast	UHF/VHF-transmission	United States	Hillsboro, Missouri		38°13′10.0″N 90°35′44″W
Pacific and Southern Company Tower East Sebago	397.7 m (1,305 ft)	1984	Guyed mast	UHF/VHF-transmission	United States	East Sebago, Maine		43°51′30.0″N 70°42′39″W
Midwest Tower Dolan Springs	396.3 m (1,300 ft)	2000	Guyed mast	UHF/VHF-transmission	United States	Dolan Springs, Arizona		35°39′07.0″N 114°18′43.8″W
MMM Tower Minden	396.3 m (1,300 ft)	2003	Guyed mast	UHF/VHF-transmission	United States	Minden, Nebraska		40°36′08.1″N 98°50′22.3″W
ACME TV Tower Madison	395.9 m (1,299 ft)	2004	Guyed mast	UHF/VHF-transmission	United States	Madison, Wisconsin		43°03′03.0″N 89°29′13″W
Clear Channel Broadcasting Tower Owasso	395.3 m (1,297 ft)	2001	Guyed mast	UHF/VHF-transmission	United States	Owasso, Oklahoma		36°31′37.3″N 95°39′12.9″W
Indosiar Television Tower	395 m (1,296 ft)	2006	Guyed mast	UHF/VHF-transmission	Indonesia	Jakarta, Indonesia	Tallest structure in Indonesia	6°11′38.04″S 106°46′5.87″E
WGBH/WBZ/WCVB Cluster	395 m (1,296 ft)	1957	Guyed mast	UHF/VHF-transmission	United States	Needham, Massachusetts		42°18′37.0″N 71°14′12″W
Beech Island Media General Broadcasting Tower	393.8 m (1,292 ft)	1957	Guyed mast	UHF/VHF-transmission	United States	Beech Island, South Carolina		33°24′18″N 81°50′14″W
Heritage Broadcasting Tower (WWTV)	393.3 m (1,290 ft)	1962	Guyed mast	UHF/VHF-transmission	United States	Tustin, Michigan	2nd Tallest Structure in Michigan	44°08′12.0″N 85°20′33″W
Entercom Greensboro Tower	393 m (1,289 ft)	1989	Guyed mast	UHF/VHF-transmission	United States	Greensboro, North Carolina		35°56′42.0″N 79°51′44″W
Richland Towers Tower Nashville	392.9 m (1,289 ft)	2002	Guyed mast	UHF/VHF-transmission	United States	Nashville, Tennessee		36°16′04.9″N 86°47′44.7″W
ERF TV Tower	391.4 m (1,284 ft)	1982	Guyed mast	UHF/VHF-transmission	United States	Dry Prong, Louisiana		31°33′55.0″N 92°33′01″W
CITIC Plaza	391.1 m (1,283 ft)	1997	Skyscraper	Office	China	Guangzhou		23°08′40″N 113°19′10″E
Appleton Tower	391 m (1,283 ft)	1983	Guyed mast	UHF/VHF-transmission	United States	Appleton, Minnesota		45°10′03.0″N 96°00′03″W
Clear Channel Broadcasting Tower Caesars Head	390.8 m (1,282 ft)	1980	Guyed mast	UHF/VHF-transmission	United States	Caesars Head, South Carolina		35°08′16.0″N 82°36′30″W
Forestport Tower	390.1 m (1,280 ft)	1950	Guyed mast	VLF/LF-transmission	United States	Forestport, New York	demolished on April 21, 1998, by explosives	43°26′41.9″N 75°5′9.55″W
WBFF Tower	390 m (1,280 ft)	1987	Guyed mast	UHF/VHF-transmission	United States	Baltimore, Maryland		39°20′10.0″N 76°38′58.0″W
Mast 0 of Naval Communication Station Harold E. Holt	389 m (1,276 ft)	1963	Guyed mast	VLF-transmission	Australia	Exmouth, Western Australia	Tallest structure in Australia	21°48′58.78″S 114°09′56.2″E
Shushi-Wan Omega Transmitter	389 m (1,276 ft)	1973	Guyed mast	VLF-transmission	Japan	Shushi-Wan, Tsushima Island	dismantled in 1998, insulated against ground	34°36′53.06″N 129°27′13.12″E
WPVI-DT/KYW-DT	389 m (1,276 ft)	1998	Guyed mast	UHF/VHF-transmission	United States	Philadelphia, Pennsylvania		40°02′33.0″N 75°14′32″W
Raleigh Roberts Tower	388.6 m (1,275 ft)	2006	Guyed mast	UHF/VHF-transmission	United States	Raleigh, Mississippi		32°07′19″N 89°32′52″W
Zhongyuan Tower	388 m (1,273 ft)	2011	Steel tower	Television/observation/restaurant	China	Zhengzhou, Henan	briefly the world's tallest steel tower	34°43′29″N 113°43′22″E
KLKE TV Tower	386.5 m (1,268 ft)	1993	Guyed mast	UHF/VHF-transmission	United States	Elgin, Nebraska		41°56′26.0″N 98°16′57″W
Clear Channel Broadcasting Tower Broken Arrow	386.5 m (1,268 ft)	2003	Guyed mast	UHF/VHF-transmission	United States	Broken Arrow, Oklahoma		36°01′36.0″N 95°40′45″W
30 Hudson Yards	386 m (1,268 ft)	2019	Skyscraper	Office, observation, retail	United States	New York City	Highest outdoor observation deck in the Western Hemisphere.	40.754661°N 74.003783°W
Iconic Tower	386 m (1266 ft)	2020	Skyscraper	Office/Residential	Egypt	New Capital	crowned as the tallest building in Africa in December 2020	30°0′36.29″N 31°41′44.79″E
Clear Channel Broadcasting Tower Little Rock	386 m (1,266 ft)	1983	Guyed mast	UHF/VHF-transmission	United States	Little Rock, Arkansas		34°47′57.0″N 92°29′30″W
Cerulean Saga Communications Tower	385.3 m (1264 ft)	1990	Guyed mast	UHF/VHF-transmission	United States	Cerulean, Kentucky		36°56′57.6″N 87°40′17.9″W
Emley Moor Mk. 2	385 m (1,263 ft)	1964	Concrete Tower	UHF/VHF-transmission	United Kingdom	Emley, West Yorkshire	Previous guyed mast collapsed on March 19, 1969, replaced by concrete tower	53°36′45.73″N 1°39′57.81″W
Inco Superstack	385 m (1,263 ft)	1971	Chimney	Nickel smelter	Canada	Copper Cliff		46°28′48.23″N 81°03′23.43″W
Kyiv TV Tower	385 m (1,263 ft)	1973	Lattice tower	UHF/VHF-transmission	Ukraine	Kyiv	Tallest lattice tower of the world	50°28′16.49″N 30°27′11.97″E
Ault Public Emergency Radio Tower	384 m (1,260 ft)	?	Guyed mast	LF-transmission	United States	Ault, Colorado		
Cambridge Public Emergency Radio Tower	384 m (1,260 ft)	?	Guyed mast	LF-transmission	United States	Cambridge, Kansas		
Shun Hing Square	384 m (1,259 ft)	1996	Skyscraper	Office	China	Shenzhen		22°32′43″N 114°06′21″E
Suffolk American Towers Tower, Tower 1	383.7 m (1,259 ft)	2003	Guyed mast	UHF/VHF-transmission	United States	Suffolk, Virginia	also known as WTVZ Tower	36°48′31.8″N 76°30′11.3″W
Sinclair Media Tower Robertsdale	383.3 m (1,259 ft)	1960	Guyed mast	UHF/VHF-transmission	United States	Robertsdale, Alabama		30°37′39.0″N 87°37′31″W
Superior OK Tower	383.1 m (1,257 ft)	1978	Guyed mast	UHF/VHF-transmission	United States	Oklahoma City, Oklahoma		35°33′36.0″N 97°29′08″W
WPSG-TV Tower	383.1 m (1,257 ft)	2003	Guyed mast	UHF/VHF-transmission	United States	Philadelphia, Pennsylvania		40°02′30.0″N 75°14′10.1″W
Autograph Tower	382.9 m (1,256 ft)	2022	Skyscraper	Mixed use	Indonesia	Jakarta, Indonesia	Tallest structure in the Southern hemisphere	
KEYI Radio Tower	382.8 m (1,256 ft)	1989	Guyed mast	UHF/VHF-transmission	United States	Alvord, Texas	also known as HBC Broadcasting Texas Tower Alvord	33°23′22.0″N 97°33′54″W
Haskell Creative Educational Media Broadcasting Tower	382.8 m (1,256 ft)	2010	Guyed mast	UHF/VHF-transmission	United States	Haskell, Oklahoma		35°53′00.2″N 95°46′14.0″W
WGHP TV 8 Tower	382.7 m (1,256 ft)	1963	Guyed mast	UHF/VHF-transmission	United States	Sophia, North Carolina		35°48′47.0″N 79°50′35″W
Barnacle Broadcasting Tower Port Royale	382.2 m (1,254 ft)	1999	Guyed mast	UHF/VHF-transmission	United States	Port Royal, South Carolina		32°25′11.0″N 80°28′30″W
Journal Broadcast Tower Arkansas City	382 m (1,253 ft)	1988	Guyed mast	UHF/VHF-transmission	United States	Arkansas City, Kansas		37°21′24.2″N 96°57′56.1″W
TVL Broadcasting Tower	381.9 m (1,253 ft)	1985	Guyed mast	UHF/VHF-transmission	United States	Oregon, Ohio		41°39′22.0″N 83°26′41″W
Newton American Towers Tower	381.9 m (1,253 ft)	2004	Guyed mast	UHF/VHF-transmission	United States	Newton, Massachusetts		42°18′27.7″N 71°13′24.8″W
Escanaba CBS Tower (WGLQ)	381.6 m (1,252 ft)	1991	Guyed mast	UHF/VHF-transmission	United States	Escanaba, Michigan	3rd Tallest Structure in Michigan	46°08′05.0″N 86°56′56″W
Univision Television Tower	381.6 m (1,252 ft)	1998	Guyed mast	UHF/VHF-transmission	United States	Marlborough, Massachusetts		42°23′02.8″N 71°29′35.2″W
American Towers Tower Whites Creek	381.4 m (1,251 ft)	2002	Guyed mast	UHF/VHF-transmission	United States	Whites Creek, Tennessee	also known as WUXP-TV Tower	36°15′49.8″N 86°47′38.9″W
Silver King Broadcasting Tower Hudson	380.7 m (1,249 ft)	1985	Guyed mast	UHF/VHF-transmission	United States	Hudson, Massachusetts		42°23′02.0″N 71°29′36″W
Gray TV Tower Maple Hill	380.7 m (1,249 ft)	1991	Guyed mast	UHF/VHF-transmission	United States	Maple Hill, Kansas		39°00′22.0″N 96°02′58″W
Nador transmitter	380 m (1,247 ft)	?	Guyed mast	LF-transmission	Morocco	Nador	3 masts	35°02′50″N 02°55′22″W; 35°02′30″N 02°55′16″W; 35°02′09″N 02°55′09″W
Bafa VLF transmitter	380 m (1,247 ft)	?	Guyed mast	VLF-transmission	Turkey	Didim	2 masts, used by US military	37°24′58.21″N 27°19′17.66″E; 37°24′33.67″N 27°19′30.36″E
Charlotte Mecklenburg Public Broadcasting Authority	380 m (1,247 ft)	1992	Guyed mast	UHF/VHF-transmission	United States	Charlotte, North Carolina		35°17′15.0″N 80°41′44″W
Jintang-Cezi Overhead Powerline Link	380 m (1247 ft)	2019	Lattice tower	electricity pylon	China	Jintang Island	Tallest electricity pylon in the world	30°05′0.88″N 121°53′10.5″E; 30°05′47.16″N 121°54′34.3″E
Gullfaks C	380 m (1,247 ft)	1990	Offshore platform	Oil drilling	Norway	North Sea		
RGV Tower	379.2 m (1,244 ft)	1991	Guyed mast	UHF/VHF-transmission	United States	La Feria, Texas		26°07′15.0″N 97°49′19″W
Kalkaska Max Media Tower	378.9 m (1243 ft)	1970	Guyed mast	UHF/VHF-transmission	United States	Kalkaska, Michigan		44°44′53″N 85°4′8″W
Globecom Tower	378.25 m (1,241 ft)	1954	Guyed mast	LF-transmission	DenmarkGreenland	Thule Air Force Base, Greenland	insulated against ground. Demolished spring 1992	
Hill Tower Cedar Hill	378 m (1,240 ft)	1991	Guyed mast	UHF/VHF-transmission	United States	Cedar Hill, Texas		32°35′17.0″N 96°58′35″W
Nextel South Tower Pendergrass	378 m (1,240 ft)	1995	Guyed mast	UHF/VHF-transmission	United States	Pendergrass, Georgia		34°12′28.0″N 83°37′48″W
Pinnacle Towers Tower Pendergrass	378 m (1,240 ft)	1995	Guyed mast	UHF/VHF-transmission	United States	Pendergrass, Georgia		34°12′27.0″N 83°37′48″W
Tuntex Sky Tower	378 m (1,240 ft)	1997	Skyscraper	Hotel, office, observation, UHF/VHF-transmission	Taiwan	Kaohsiung		22°36′42″N 120°18′0″E
Nebraska Educational Telecommunication Tower Giltner	377.3 m (1,238 ft)	1968	Guyed mast	UHF/VHF-transmission	United States	Giltner, Nebraska		40°46′20.0″N 98°05′22″W
Emirates Park Towers	376 m (1,233 ft)	2012	Skyscraper	Hotel	United Arab Emirates	Dubai		25.1856°N 55.2566°E
WRLH TV Tower	375.8 m (1,233 ft)	1982	Guyed mast	UHF/VHF-transmission	United States	Midlothian, Virginia		37°30′22.0″N 77°41′57″W
Brill Media Tower	375.5 m (1,232 ft)	1991	Guyed mast	UHF/VHF-transmission	United States	Mc Girk, Missouri		38°38′16.0″N 92°29′35″W
WSET Tower	374.9 m (1,230 ft)	1983	Guyed mast	UHF/VHF-transmission	United States	Thaxton, Virginia		37°18′55.0″N 79°38′05″W
Tashkent Tower	374.9 m (1,230 ft)	1985	Tower	UHF/VHF-transmission, observation	Uzbekistan	Tashkent		41°20′44.05″N 69°17′4.57″E
Clear Channel Broadcasting Tower Buda	374.6 m (1,229 ft)	1991	Guyed mast	UHF/VHF-transmission	United States	Buda, Texas		30°02′43.0″N 97°52′51″W
KVAT-TV Tower	374.6 m (1,229 ft)	1997	Guyed mast	UHF/VHF-transmission	United States	Austin, Texas		30°19′23.8″N 97°47′59.5″W
Nexstar Tower Vidor	374 m (1,227 ft)	1991	Guyed mast	UHF/VHF-transmission	United States	Vidor, Texas		30°09′21.0″N 93°59′11″W
Central Plaza	374 m (1,227 ft)	1992	Skyscraper	Office	Hong Kong	Hong Kong		22°16′48″N 114°10′25″E
Hawes Radio Tower	373.7 m (1,226 ft)	1967	Guyed mast	LF-transmission	United States	Hinkley, California	insulated against ground, demolished in 1986	34°55′01″N 117°22′36″W
Silver Creek Communications Annex	373.7 m (1,226 ft)	1968	Guyed mast	LF-transmission	United States	Silver Creek, Nebraska	insulated against ground, demolished in 1995	41°20′46″N 97°43′18″W
WVEC TV Tower	373.4 m (1,225 ft)	1999	Guyed mast	UHF/VHF-transmission	United States	Suffolk, Virginia		36°49′00.0″N 76°28′05″W
KATC Tower	373.1 m (1,224 ft)	1964	Guyed mast	UHF/VHF-transmission	United States	Kaplan, Louisiana		30°02′39.0″N 92°22′14″W
Super Tower Estero	373 m (1,224 ft)	1985	Guyed mast	UHF/VHF-transmission	United States	Estero, Florida		26°25′23.0″N 81°37′48″W
WABV TV Tower	372.8 m (1,222 ft)	1966	Guyed mast	UHF/VHF-transmission	United States	Pelham, Georgia		31°08′06.0″N 84°06′16″W
Citadel Broadcasting Tower Brentwood	372.8 m (1,223 ft)	1983	Guyed mast	UHF/VHF-transmission	United States	Brentwood, Tennessee		36°02′08.0″N 86°50′55″W
SpectraSite Tower Louisburg	372.8 m (1,223 ft)	1995	Guyed mast	UHF/VHF-transmission	United States	Louisburg, North Carolina		36°06′12.0″N 78°11′28″W
Pinnacle Tower	372.5 m (1,222 ft)	1997	Guyed mast	UHF/VHF-transmission	United States	Richmond, Virginia		37°30′15.0″N 77°41′51″W
Comcast Technology Center	372.2 m (1,221 ft)	2018	Skyscraper	Office	United States	Philadelphia, Pennsylvania		39.9549°N 75.1704°W
MATC Guyed Mast	372.2 m (1,221 ft)	2000	Guyed mast	UHF/VHF-transmission	United States	Milwaukee, Wisconsin		43°06′42.0″N 87°55′50″W
Kansas City Public Broadcasting Tower	372 m (1,221 ft)	1969	Guyed Mast	UHF/VHF-transmission	United States	Kansas City, Missouri		39°04′58″N 94°28′50″W
Liberation Tower	372 m (1,220 ft)	1996	Concrete tower	UHF/VHF-transmission, observation	Kuwait	Kuwait City		29°22′05.8″N 47°58′29.83″E
Almaty Tower	371.5 m (1,219 ft)	1983	Steel tube tower	UHF/VHF-transmission, observation	Kazakhstan	Almaty	Tallest steel tube tower in the world	43°13′43.26″N 76°58′34.77″E
Chimney of Homer City Generating Station	371 m (1,217 ft)	1977	Chimney	Power station	United States	Homer City, Pennsylvania	Demolished in 2025	40°30′39″N 79°11′37″W
Kennecott Smokestack	370.4 m (1,215 ft)	1974	Chimney	Copper smelter	United States	Tooele, Utah		40°43′18″N 112°11′52″W
WCCB-TV/FOX Tower	370.2 m (1,215 ft)	1966	Guyed mast	UHF/VHF-transmission	United States	Charlotte, North Carolina		35°16′02.0″N 80°44′04″W
Torreta de Guardamar	370 m (1,214 ft)	1962	Guyed mast	LF-transmission	Spain	Guardamar del Segura	tallest structure in European Union	38°4′18.84″N 0°39′52.65″W
Chimney of Berezovskaya GRES	370 m (1,214 ft)	1985	Chimney	Power station	Russia	Sharypovo		55°34′45.65″N 89°04′23.21″E
Alcalde Pueblo of San Juan Tower	370 m (1,214 ft)	1999	Guyed mast	UHF/VHF-transmission	United States	Alcalde, New Mexico		36°05′21.0″N 106°01′43″W
Little Rock KATV-TV Tower	370 m (1214 ft)	2009	Guyed mast	UHF/VHF-transmission	United States	Little Rock, Arkansas		34°47′50″N 92°29′20″W
Zhoushan Island Overhead Powerline Tie	370 m (1214 ft)	2009	Lattice tower	electricity pylon	China	Damao Island		29°56′2.78″N 122°2′10.12″E; 29°54′41.39″N 122°1′26.38″E
Milwaukee Area Technical College District Board Tower	369.7 m (1,213 ft)	2002	Guyed mast	UHF/VHF-transmission	United States	Milwaukee, Wisconsin		43°05′46.2″N 87°54′15″W
KVUE-TV/KEYE-TV Tower	369.1 m (1,211 ft)	1997	Guyed mast	UHF/VHF-transmission	United States	Austin, Texas	also used by KEYE-TV and KVUE-TV	30°19′19.3″N 97°48′12.6″W
Pinnacle Towers Tower Church Point	368.5 m (1,209 ft)	1984	Guyed mast	UHF/VHF-transmission	United States	Church Point, Louisiana		30°21′44.7″N 92°12′53.5″W
WTVY Radio Tower	368.5 m (1,209 ft)	1987	Guyed mast	UHF/VHF-transmission	United States	Webb, Alabama		31°15′17.0″N 85°15′39″W
Riga Radio and TV Tower	368.5 m (1,209 ft)	1987	Concrete tower	UHF/VHF-transmission, observation	Latvia	Riga		56°55′26.08″N 24°08′13.26″E
Berliner Fernsehturm	368 m (1,207 ft)	1969	Concrete tower	UHF/VHF-transmission, observation	Germany	Berlin		52°31′14.91″N 13°24′33.95″E
Bonita Flinn Broadcasting Tower	367.9 m (1,207 ft)	2001	Guyed mast	UHF/VHF-transmission	United States	Bonita, Alabama		32°32′26″N 86°50′34″W
SpectraSite Tower Conroe	367.8 m (1,207 ft)	1995	Guyed mast	UHF/VHF-transmission	United States	Conroe, Texas		30°15′46.0″N 95°14′48″W
Chimney of Mitchell Power Plant	367.6 m (1,206 ft)	1971	Chimney	Power station	United States	Moundsville, West Virginia		39°49′47.72″N 80°48′54.78″W
WDAY TV Tower	367.4 m (1,205 ft)	1978	Guyed mast	UHF/VHF-transmission	United States	Amenia, North Dakota		47°00′28.0″N 97°12′03″W
Bank of China Tower	367.4 m (1,205 ft)	1990	Skyscraper	Office	Hong Kong	Hong Kong		22°16′45″N 114°09′41″E
Aguada transmission station	367.3 m (1,205 ft)	?	Guyed mast	LF-transmission	United StatesPuerto Rico	Aguada		18°23′55″N 67°10′38″W
Haskell Renda Broadcasting Tower	367.3 m (1,205 ft)	1967	Guyed mast	UHF/VHF-transmission	United States	Haskell, Oklahoma		35°51′40.0″N 95°46′04″W
Spectrasite Communications Tower Monteville	367.3 m (1205 ft)	2002	Guyed mast	UHF/VHF-transmission	United States	Monteville, Connecticut		41°25′03.7″N 72°11′53.2″W
Reiten TV tower	367 m (1,204 ft)	1969	Guyed mast	UHF/VHF-transmission	United States	Saint Anthony, North Dakota		46°35′23.0″N 100°48′22″W
Renda Tower Espanola	367 m (1,204 ft)	1982	Guyed mast	UHF/VHF-transmission	United States	Espanola, Florida		29°31′08.0″N 81°19′01″W
Gerbrandy Tower	366.8 m (1,203 ft)	1961	Partially guyed tower	UHF/VHF-transmission	Netherlands	Lopik	Original height: 382.5 metres. 1987: height reduction to 375 metres. Further height reduction to 366.8 metres on August 2, 2007	52°00′36.24″N 05°03′12.87″E
KXEO Radio Tower Missouri	366.7 m (1,203 ft)	1999	Guyed mast	UHF/VHF-transmission	United States	Rural Audrain Country, Missouri		39°15′49.0″N 92°08′07″W
Omega Tower Trelew	366 m (1,201 ft)	1976	Guyed mast	VLF-transmission	Argentina	Golfo Nuevo	insulated against ground, demolished	43°03′12.79″S 65°11′26.81″W
Omnicom Tower Sharon	366 m (1,201 ft)	1984	Guyed mast	UHF/VHF-transmission	United States	Sharon, Oklahoma		36°16′06.0″N 99°26′57″W
UHF Candelabra	366 m (1,201 ft)	2004? /1957?	Guyed mast	UHF/VHF-transmission	United States	Needham, Massachusetts	identic with Needham CBS TV Mast?	42°18′10.7″N 71°13′04.9″W
Grace University Tower Springfield	365.9 m (1,201 ft)	2000	Guyed mast	UHF/VHF-transmission	United States	Springfield, Nebraska		41°03′01.2″N 96°11′34.2″W
Bank of America Tower, New York City	366 m (1,200 ft)	2008	Skyscraper	Office	United States	New York City	under construction, topped out	40°45′19″N 73°59′03″W
Central mast of NSS Annapolis	365.8 m (1,200 ft)	?	Guyed mast	VLF-transmission	United States	Annapolis, Maryland	insulated against ground, demolished	38°58′40″N 76°27′12″W
State of Wisconsin Tower Colfax	365.8 m (1,200 ft)	1973	Guyed mast	UHF/VHF-transmission	United States	Colfax, Wisconsin		45°02′48.9″N 91°51′47.6″W
WIAT-TV Tower	365.8 m (1,200 ft)	1974	Guyed mast	UHF/VHF-transmission	United States	Stapleton, Alabama		30°41′17.0″N 87°47′54.0″W
England Agape Church Broadcasting Tower	365.8 m (1,200 ft)	1988	Guyed mast	UHF/VHF-transmission	United States	England, Arkansas		34°31′55″N 92°2′41″W
Ottumwa Media Tower Richland	365.8 m (1,200 ft)	1993	Guyed mast	UHF/VHF-transmission	United States	Richland, Iowa		41°11′42.0″N 91°57′16″W
Iowa Public Television Tower	365.8 m (1,200 ft)	1997	Guyed mast	UHF/VHF-transmission	United States	Bradgate, Iowa		42°49′03.0″N 94°24′42″W
Triathlon Broadcasting Tower	365.8 m (1,200 ft)	1998	Guyed mast	UHF/VHF-transmission	United States	Oakland, Iowa		41°23′53.0″N 95°28′17″W
Clear Channel Broadcasting Tower Newnan	365.8 m (1,200 ft)	2002	Guyed mast	UHF/VHF-transmission	United States	Newnan, Georgia		33°24′41.0″N 84°49′47.8″W
Iberia Communications Tower	365.8 m (1,200 ft)	?	Guyed mast	UHF/VHF-transmission	United States	St. Mary Parish, Louisiana		29°46′52″N 91°44′59″W
Çamlıca Tower	365.5 m (1,199 ft)	2020	Concrete tower		Turkey	Istanbul		
Channel 48 Tower	365.5 m (1,199 ft)	1993	Guyed mast	UHF/VHF-transmission	United States	Friendswood, Texas		29°27′58.0″N 95°13′24″W
WCPE Radio Tower	365.5 m (1,199 ft)	1998	Guyed mast	UHF/VHF-transmission	United States	Wake Forest, North Carolina		35°56′26.0″N 78°28′44″W
Clear Channel Broadcasting Tower Brunswick	365.4 m (1,199 ft)	1999	Guyed mast	UHF/VHF-transmission	United States	Brunswick, Tennessee		35°16′33.0″N 89°46′38″W
La Moure Omega transmitter	365.26 m (1,198 ft)	?	Guyed mast	VLF-transmission	United States	La Moure, North Dakota	insulated against ground	46°21′57.4″N 98°20′08.22″W
Pinnacle Towers New London	365 m (1,198 ft)	1984	Guyed mast	UHF/VHF-transmission	United States	New London, Texas		32°15′37.0″N 94°57′03″W
KNVA-TV Tower	365 m (1,198 ft)	1965	Guyed mast	UHF/VHF-transmission	United States	Austin, Texas		30°19′34.0″N 97°47′59″W
Skelton transmitter	365 m (1,198 ft)	2001	Guyed mast	VLF-transmission	United Kingdom	Skelton, Cumbria	insulated against ground	54°43′54.5″N 2°52′58.9″W
Zibakenar TV Mast	365 m (1,198 ft)		Guyed mast	UHF/VHF-transmission	Iran	Zibakenar		37°26′28.45″N 49°49′47.74″E
Schipkau GICON Wind Turbine	365 m (1,198 ft)	2026		Wind Turbine	Germany			
WRJA-TV-FM Tower	364.7 m (1,197 ft)	2004	Guyed mast	UHF/VHF-transmission	United States	Sumter, South Carolina		33°52′52.0″N 80°16′14″W
Boerne Fritz Communications Tower	364.2 m (1,195 ft)	?	Guyed mast	UHF/VHF-transmission	United States	Boerne, Texas		29°50′26″N 98°49′33″W
Naval Communication Station Harold E. Holt, inner ring masts	364 m (1,194 ft)	1967	Guyed mast	VLF-transmission	Australia	Exmouth, Western Australia	6 towers	21°48′47.86″S 114°10′19.56″E; 21°49′12.14″S 114°10′18.06″E; 21°49′23.03″S 114°09′54.71″E; 21°49′09.69″S 114°09′32.93″E; 21°48′45.43″S 114°9′34.51″E; 21°48′34.53″S 114°9′57.9″E
Trbovlje Chimney	364 m (1,194 ft)	1976	Chimney	Power station	Slovenia	Trbovlje		46°07′33.68″N 15°03′42.34″E
Fairview Ohio University Telecommonication Center Tower	363.9 m (1,194 ft)	2004	Guyed mast	UHF/VHF-transmission	United States	Fairview, Ohio		40°05′32.0″N 81°17′18.0″W
South Carolina Educational TV tower Sumter	363.3 m (1,192 ft)	1975	Guyed mast	UHF/VHF-transmission	United States	Sumter, South Carolina	dismantled	33°52′52.0″N 80°16′15″W
KSAX-TV Tower	363.3 m (1,192 ft)	1987	Guyed mast	UHF/VHF-transmission	United States	Westport, Minnesota		45°41′59.0″N 95°10′36″W
Sender Donebach	363 m (1,191 ft)	1982	Guyed mast	LF-transmission	Germany	Mudau-Donebach, Baden-Wu"rttemberg	demolished in 2018	49°33′40.25″N 9°10′22.76″E ; 49°33′33.53″N 9°10′50.82″E
Hoyt Channel 3 Tower	362.7 m (1190 ft)	2010	Guyed mast	UHF/VHF-transmission	United States	Hoyt, Colorado		40°02′01.2″N 103°56′18.9″W
Aon Center	362.5 m (1,189 ft)	1973	Skyscraper		United States	Chicago		41°53′07″N 87°37′17″W
Midwest Tower Partners Tower Neese	362.4 m (1,189 ft)	1981	Guyed mast	UHF/VHF-transmission	United States	Neese, Georgia		34°05′01.1″N 83°19′19.3″W
MMM Tower Eagle	361.1 m (1,185 ft)	1988	Guyed mast	UHF/VHF-transmission	United States	Eagle, Nebraska		40°47′10.0″N 96°23′11″W
FTS Philadelphia	361 m (1,184 ft)	1988	Guyed mast	UHF/VHF-transmission	United States	Philadelphia, Pennsylvania	also known as WCAU-TV	40°02′26.0″N 75°14′18″W
World Radio Tower Santa Maria	360.9 m (1,184 ft)	1987	Guyed mast	UHF/VHF-transmission	United States	Santa Maria, Texas		26°04′53.0″N 97°49′42″W
Richland Towers Tower Atlanta	360.3 m (1,182 ft)	2002	Guyed mast	UHF/VHF-transmission	United States	Atlanta, Georgia		33°48′26.4″N 84°20′21.5″W
The Pinnacle	360 m (1,181 ft)	2011	Skyscraper	Mixed use	China	Guangzhou		23.1278°N 113.3180°E
FM- and TV-mast Olsztyn-Pieczewo	360 m (1,181 ft)	1969	Guyed mast	UHF/VHF-transmission	Poland	Olsztyn-Pieczewo, Warmian-Masurian Voivodship		53°45′11.94″N 20°31′5.33″E
Trinity Broadcasting Tower Oklahoma	360 m (1,181 ft)	1981	Guyed mast	UHF/VHF-transmission	United States	Oklahoma City, Oklahoma		35°34′35.0″N 97°29′10″W
Tambov TV Mast	360 m (1,181 ft)	1991	Guyed mast	UHF/VHF-transmission	Russia	Tambov		52°46′51.1″N 41°24′50.8″E
Donetsk TV Mast	360 m (1,181 ft)	1992	Guyed mast	UHF/VHF-transmission	Ukraine	Donetsk		47°56′43.49″N 37°38′36.95″E
Novosokolniki TV Mast	360 m (1,181 ft)	1995	Guyed mast	UHF/VHF-transmission	Russia	Novosokolniki		56°20′00″N 30°01′00″E
Longwave transmitter Ingoy	360 m (1,181 ft)	2000	Guyed mast	LF-transmission	Norway	Ingoy		71°04′17.5″N 24°05′15″E
Almas Tower	360 m (1,181 ft)	2008	Skyscraper	Office	United Arab Emirates	Dubai	under construction, topped out	25°4′8.25″N 55°8′28.34″E
Sender Zehlendorf, new longwave transmission mast	359.7 m (1,180 ft)	1979	Guyed mast	LW/FM-transmission	Germany	Zehlendorf bei Oranienburg, Brandenburg		52°47′41.87″N 13°23′9.5″E
Prairie Public Broadcasting Tower	359.1 m (1,178 ft)	1980	Guyed mast	UHF/VHF-transmission	United States	Amenia, North Dakota		47°00′45.0″N 97°11′42″W
Nashville NewsChannel 5 Broadcasting Tower	359 m (1,178 ft)	1986	Guyed mast	UHF/VHF-transmission	United States	Nashville, Tennessee		36°16′5″N 86°47′15″W
Cox Radio Tower Security	358.7 m (1,177 ft)	1988	Guyed mast	UHF/VHF-transmission	United States	Security, Texas		30°20′03.0″N 95°12′52″W
WCML TV channel 6 Tower Atlanta	358.8 m (1,177 ft)	1972	Guyed mast	UHF/VHF-transmission	United States	Atlanta, Michigan	4th tallest structure in Michigan	45°08′18.0″N 84°09′45″W
Paxson Syracuse Tower West Monroe	358.7 m (1,177 ft)	1998	Guyed mast	UHF/VHF-transmission	United States	West Monroe, New York		43°18′18.2″N 76°02′58.7″W
Berlin-Frohnau Directional Radio Mast	358.6 m (1,177 ft)	1978	Guyed mast	UHF/VHF-transmission	Germany	Berlin-Frohnau, Berlin	Used until 1990 for directional radio link to West-Berlin, demolished on February 8, 2009	52°39′13.66″N 13°17′43.59″E
Briarcliff Property Tenants	357.8 m (1,174 ft)	1969	Guyed mast	UHF/VHF-transmission	United States	Atlanta, Georgia		33°48′27.0″N 84°20′27″W
CHCH Television Tower	357.5 m (1,173 ft)	1960	Guyed mast	UHF/VHF-transmission	Canada	Hamilton, Ontario	Demolished on March 14, 2024	43°12′27.11″N 79°46′30.79″W
Pappas Telecasting Tower Lowell	357.5 m (1,173 ft)	1963	Guyed mast	UHF/VHF-transmission	United States	Lowell, Nebraska		40°39′27.9″N 98°52′05″W
NYT Tower Figure Five	357.5 m (1,173 ft)	1985	Guyed mast	UHF/VHF-transmission	United States	Figure Five, Arkansas		35°30′43.0″N 94°21′39″W
Western New York Public Broadcasting Tower	357.2 m (1,172 ft)	1986	Guyed mast	UHF/VHF-transmission	United States	Grand Island, New York	Height reduction to 345.6 metres	43°01′48.2″N 78°55′14.1″W
Kenadsa longwave transmitter	357 m (1,171 ft)	?	Guyed mast	LF-transmission	Algeria	Kenadsa	3 masts of same height	31°34′5.08″N 2°20′55.14″W; 31°34′11.82″N 2°20′42.02″W 31°34′18.53″N 2°20′28.91″W
Greater Dayton Public TV Tower	356.7 m (1,170 ft)	1985	Guyed mast	UHF/VHF-transmission	United States	Dayton, Ohio		39°43′16.0″N 84°15′00″W
American Towers Tower Colwich	356.3 m (1,169 ft)	2001	Guyed mast	UHF/VHF-transmission	United States	Colwich, Kansas		37°48′00.7″N 97°31′30.2″W
Montgomery Tower	356.1 m (1,168 ft)	1988	Guyed mast	UHF/VHF-transmission	United States	Montgomery, Alabama		32°24′13.0″N 86°11′47″W
University of North Carolina Tower Farmville	356 m (1,168 ft)	1968/2002	Guyed mast	UHF/VHF-transmission	United States	Farmville, North Carolina	2 towers	35°33′11.0″N 77°36′04.8″W
Endesa Termic	356 m (1,168 ft)	1974	Chimney	Power station	Spain	As Pontes, Galicia		43°26′29″N 7°51′45.50″W
Sarepta transmitter, large mast	356 m (1,168 ft)	?	Guyed mast	LF-transmission?	Kazakhstan	Sarepta		49°41′48.75″N 72°25′59.5″E
KSMO Candelabra Tower	356 m (1,168 ft)	2001	Guyed mast	UHF/VHF-transmission	United States	Independence, Missouri		39°05′25.8″N 94°28′19.2″W
Shenzhen Weather Observation Gradient Tower	356 m (1,168 ft)	2017	Guyed mast	Weather observation	China	Shenzhen		22°39′13″N 113°53′39″E
SEG Plaza	355.8 m (1,167 ft)	2000	Skyscraper	Office	China	Shenzhen		
WDAF Tower	355 m (1,165 ft)	1967	Guyed mast	UHF/VHF-transmission	United States	Kansas City, Missouri		39°04′21.0″N 94°35′46″W
Tipaza Longwave Transmitter	355 m (1,165 ft)	?	Guyed mast	LF-transmission	Algeria	Tipaza		36°33′58.14″N 2°28′50.3″W
First Canadian Place	355 m (1,165 ft)	1975	Skyscraper	Office, UHF/VHF-transmission	Canada	Toronto		43°38′55″N 79°22′54″W
FM- and TV-mast Kosztowy	355 m (1,165 ft)	1976	Guyed mast	UHF/VHF-transmission	Poland	Kosztowy		50°11′16.75″N 19°06′57.97″E
RKS Liblice 2	355 m (1,165 ft)	1975/76	Guyed mast	MF-transmission	Czech Republic	Liblice	Former 2 masts, tallest masts used until October 2025 for mediumwave broadcasting. Demolished on October 15, 2026	50°3′43.37″N 14°53′11.27″E; 50°3′47.12″N 14°53′12.84″E
University of North Carolina Tower Brinkleyville	355 m (1,165 ft)	1983	Guyed mast	UHF/VHF-transmission	United States	Brinkleyville, North Carolina		36°17′28.0″N 77°50′10″W
Straseni TV Mast	355 m (1,165 ft)	1988	Guyed mast	UHF/VHF-transmission	Moldova	Straseni		47°07′18.97″N 28°33′54.27″E
KPXE Tower	354.8 m (1,164 ft)	1978	Guyed mast	UHF/VHF-transmission	United States	Kansas City, Missouri	dismantled	39°01′19.0″N 94°30′51″W
KTMD-TV Tower	354.8 m (1,164 ft)	1995	Guyed mast	UHF/VHF-transmission	United States	Friendswood, Texas		29°27′57.0″N 95°13′24″W
KSHB/KMCI Tower	354.8 m (1,164 ft)	2003	Guyed mast	UHF/VHF-transmission	United States	Kansas City, Missouri		38°58′42.0″N 94°32′01.8″W
Lipetsk TV Mast	354.6 m (1,163 ft)	1991	Guyed mast	UHF/VHF-transmission	Russia	Lipetsk		52°40′13″N 39°28′59″E
Emirates Office Tower	354.6 m (1,163 ft)	2000	Skyscraper	Office	United Arab Emirates	Dubai		25°07′49″N 55°09′57″E
Clear Channel Broadcasting Tower Colwich	354.2 m (1,162 ft)	1985	Guyed mast	UHF/VHF-transmission	United States	Colwich, Kansas		37°46′40.0″N 97°30′38″W
TV Tower Vinnytsia	354 m (1,161 ft)	1961	Guyed mast	UHF/VHF-transmission	Ukraine	Vinnytsia	Equipped with 6 crossbars, running from mast body to the guys	49°14′30.04″N 28°25′25.25″E
KDEN TV Tower	353.9 m (1,161 ft)	1996	Guyed mast	UHF/VHF-transmission	United States	Frederick, Colorado	also known as Citicasters Tower Frederick	40°05′47.0″N 104°54′06″W
Sosnovy Longwave Radio Mast	353.5 m (1,160 ft)	?	Guyed mast	LF-transmission	Belarus	Sosnovy	used for broadcasting on 279 kHz with 500 kW	53°24′10.71″N 28°31′16.32″E
SpectraSite Communications tower Glenmore	353.3 m (1,159 ft)	1999	Guyed mast	UHF/VHF-transmission	United States	Greenleaf, Wisconsin		44°20′00.1″N 87°58′55.7″W
Frederick Longmont Broadcasting Tower	353.2 m (1,159 ft)	2006	Guyed mast	UHF/VHF-transmission	United States	Frederick, Colorado		40°05′59.0″N 104°54′04.0″W
Emmis TV Tower Ledgeview Township	353 m (1,158 ft)	1961	Guyed mast	UHF/VHF-transmission	United States	Ledgeview Township, Wisconsin		44°24′32.0″N 87°59′31.0″W
KPXE Tower	353 m (1,158 ft)	2003	Guyed mast	UHF/VHF-transmission	United States	Kansas City, Missouri		39°01′19.9″N 94°30′49.7″W
Philadelphia American Towers Tower	352.9 m (1,158 ft)	1979	Guyed mast	UHF/VHF-transmission	United States	Philadelphia, Pennsylvania	also known as WWSG-TV Tower	40°02′19.6″N 75°14′12.7″W
VLF transmitter DHO38	352.9 m (1,158 ft)	1982	Guyed mast	VLF-transmission	Germany	Saterland-Ramsloh, Lower Saxony	8 masts, insulated against ground	53°05′22.15″N 07°37′06.19″E; 53°05′14.42″N 07°36′31.14″E; 53°04′59.81″N 07°37′09.88″E; 53°04′52.03″N 07°36′34.69″E; 53°04′36.16″N 07°36′58.79″E; 53°04′30.05″N 07°36′22.87″E; 53°04′10.66″N 07°36′41.82″E; 53°04′16.8″N 07°37′17.66″E
Ölgii transmitter	352.5 m (1,156 ft)	?	Guyed mast	LF-transmission	Mongolia	Olgii		48°57′24.52″N 89°58′13.15″E
KDNL TV Tower 2	352.1 m (1,155 ft)	1969	Guyed mast	UHF/VHF-transmission	United States	Shrewsbury, Missouri		38°34′50.0″N 90°19′45″W
Cox Radio Tower Newnan	352 m (1,155 ft)	1985	Guyed mast	UHF/VHF-transmission	United States	Newnan, Georgia		33°24′43.0″N 84°50′03″W
Southeastern Media Tower Beech Island	352 m (1,155 ft)	1990	Guyed mast	UHF/VHF-transmission	United States	Beech Island, South Carolina		33°25′01.0″N 81°50′05″W
Cowskin Broadcasting Tower Colwich	351.7 m (1,154 ft)	1984	Guyed mast	UHF/VHF-transmission	United States	Colwich, Kansas		37°47′47.0″N 97°32′00″W
American Towers Tower Dayton	351.7 m (1,154 ft)	2001	Guyed mast	UHF/VHF-transmission	United States	Dayton, Ohio		39°43′28.6″N 84°15′17.6″W
Chimney of Phoenix Copper Smelter	351.5 m (1,153 ft)	1995	Chimney	Copper smelter	Romania	Baia Mare		47°39′10.39″N 23°36′19.72″E
Young Broadcasting Tower Knoxville	351.4 m (1,153 ft)	1975	Guyed mast	UHF/VHF-transmission	United States	Knoxville, Tennessee		36°00′13.0″N 83°56′34″W
Omaha Great Empire Broadcasting Tower	351.4 m (1,153 ft)	1989	Guyed mast	UHF/VHF-transmission	United States	Omaha, Nebraska		41°18′16.0″N 96°01′42″W
Gillette Wyoming Legends Communication Tower	351.4 m (1153 ft)	2008	Guyed mast	UHF/VHF-transmission	United States	Gillette, Wyoming		43°59′57.0″N 105°15′17.0″W
Belmont mast	351.3 m (1,153 ft)	1965	Guyed mast	UHF/VHF-transmission	United Kingdom	Donington on Bain, Lincolnshire	until 2010 tallest construction in the EU. Original height 385.6 m (1265 ft). Extension to 387.7 m (1272 ft) in 1967. Height reduction in 2010 to 351.5 m (1153 ft)	53°20′9.07″N 0°10′19.11″W
Sender Zehlendorf, old longwave transmission mast	351 m (1,152 ft)	1962	Guyed mast	LF-transmission	Germany	Zehlendorf bei Oranienburg, Brandenburg	destroyed on May 18, 1978, at aircraft collision	52°47′41.87″N 13°23′9.5″E
Basra transmitter, Mast West	350.5 m (1,150 ft)		Guyed mast	UHF/VHF-transmission	Iraq	Basra		30°28′25.43″N 47°47′39.16″E
KSDK Tower	350.2 m (1,149 ft)	1958	Guyed mast	UHF/VHF-transmission	United States	Shrewsbury, Missouri		38°34′05.0″N 90°19′55″W
Saga Communications Tower Mitchellville	350.2 m (1,149 ft)	1983	Guyed mast	UHF/VHF-transmission	United States	Mitchellville, Iowa	dismantled	41°36′36.6″N 93°21′52.8″W
Raycom National Tower	350.2 m (1,149 ft)	1985	Guyed mast	UHF/VHF-transmission	United States	Parma, Ohio		41°23′15.0″N 81°41′42″W
The Strat	350.2 m (1,149 ft)	1996	Concrete tower	Observation, ride	United States	Las Vegas, Nevada		36°08′50.59″N 115°9′19.4″W
WBAY TV tower	350.2 m (1,149 ft)	2002	Guyed mast	UHF/VHF-transmission	United States	Ledgeview, Wisconsin		44°24′34.6″N 88°00′06.7″W
Colombo Lotus Tower	350 m (1,150 ft)	2018	Concrete tower	Communication, Observation	Sri Lanka	Colombo	Tallest structure in South Asia.	06°55′37″N 79°51′30″E
Longwave transmitter Allouis	350 m (1,148 ft)	1952	Guyed mast	LF-transmission	France	Allouis	2 masts	47°10′10.45″N 2°12′16.75″E; 47°10′25.34″N 2°12′16.81″E
Emmis TV tower Topeka	350 m (1,148 ft)	1967	Guyed mast	UHF/VHF-transmission	United States	Topeka, Kansas		39°05′34.0″N 95°47′05″W
Sendemast SL3	350 m (1,148 ft)	1968	Guyed mast	LF-transmission	Germany	Burg bei Magdeburg (today in Saxony-Anhalt)	collapsed on February 18, 1976	52°16′9.35″N 11°55′28.84″E
Mosolovo TV Mast	350 m (1,148 ft)	1968	Guyed mast	UHF/VHF-transmission	Russia	Mosolovo		54°16′17.9″N 40°33′26.34″E
Kolodischi TV Mast	350 m (1,148 ft)	1970	Guyed mast	UHF/VHF-transmission	Belarus	Minsk		53°57′40.5″N 27°46′42.08″E
Lipin Bor TV Mast	350 m (1,148 ft)	1970	Guyed mast	UHF/VHF-transmission	Russia	Lipin Bor		60°21′27″N 37°55′15″E
Grigoriopol transmitter, 350 m mast	350 m (1,148 ft)	?	Guyed mast	MF-transmission	Moldova	Mayak	collapsed in 1997	47°17′21.4″N 29°26′0.25″E
Selizharovo TV Mast	350 m (1,148 ft)	1971	Guyed mast	UHF/VHF-transmission	Russia	Selizharovo		56°55′03″N 33°34′47″E
Pinerovka TV Mast	350 m (1,148 ft)	1971	Guyed mast	UHF/VHF-transmission	Russia	Pinerovka		51°35′20″N 43°01′36″E
Ushachi TV Mast	350 m (1,148 ft)	1974	Guyed mast	UHF/VHF-transmission	Belarus	Ushachi		55°14′40.43″N 28°38′30.95″E
Yershov TV Mast	350 m (1,148 ft)	1974	Guyed mast	UHF/VHF-transmission	Russia	Yershov		51°21′51″N 48°17′58″E
Chimney of Syrdarya Power Plant	350 m (1,148 ft)	1975	Chimney	Power station	Uzbekistan	Syrdarya		40°13′49.06″N 69°05′55.97″E
Tula TV Mast	350 m (1,148 ft)	1975/76	Guyed mast	UHF/VHF-transmission	Russia	Tula		54°8′27″N 37°35′03″E
Rodniki TV Mast	350 m (1,148 ft)	1977	Guyed mast	UHF/VHF-transmission	Russia	Rodniki		57°05′24″N 41°44′02″E
Novo-Bykovo TV Mast	350 m (1,148 ft)	1977	Guyed mast	UHF/VHF-transmission	Russia	Vladimir		56°01′10″N 40°50′25″E
Volga TV Mast	350 m (1,148 ft)	1978	Guyed mast	UHF/VHF-transmission	Russia	Rybinsk		57°57′53″N 38°21′14″E
Kanevskaya TV Mast	350 m (1,148 ft)	1979	Guyed mast	UHF/VHF-transmission	Russia	Kanevskaya		46°03′27.18″N 38°57′57.43″E
Stavropol TV Mast	350 m (1,148 ft)	1979	Guyed mast	UHF/VHF-transmission	Russia	Stavropol		45°00′44.04″N 41°51′11.54″E
Livny TV Mast	350 m (1,148 ft)	1979?	Guyed mast	UHF/VHF-transmission	Russia	Livny		52°27′03″N 37°30′10″E
Ust-Kalmanka TV Mast	350 m (1,148 ft)	1979	Guyed mast	UHF/VHF-transmission	Russia	Ust-Kalmanka		52°09′51″N 83°18′08″E
Sovetsky TV Mast	350 m (1,148 ft)	1984	Guyed mast	UHF/VHF-transmission	Russia	Sovetsky, Mari El Republic		56°45′17″N 48°32′05″E
Smogiri TV Mast	350 m (1,148 ft)	1988	Guyed mast	UHF/VHF-transmission	Russia	Smolensk		55°02′08″N 32°22′52″E
Varaksino TV Mast	350 m (1,148 ft)	1988	Guyed mast	UHF/VHF-transmission	Russia	Izhevsk		56°52′13.44″N 53°03′03.02″E
Tsivilsk TV Mast (РТПС Цивильск)	350 m (1,148 ft)	1990	Guyed mast	UHF/VHF-transmission	Russia	Tsivilsk		55°48′22″N 47°26′42″E
Uchkizil TV Mast	350 m (1,148 ft)	1990	Guyed mast	UHF/VHF-transmission	Uzbekistan	Uchkizil, Termez		37°21′24.88″N 67°11′54.88″E
Trinity Broadcasting Tower Conyers	350 m (1,148 ft)	1991	Guyed mast	UHF/VHF-transmission	United States	Conyers, Georgia		33°44′22.0″N 84°00′14″W
KTTC-TV Tower	350 m (1,148 ft)	1998	Guyed mast	UHF/VHF-transmission	United States	Grand Meadow, Minnesota	digital	43°38′34.0″N 92°31′36″W
Corridor TV Tower	350 m (1,148 ft)	2000	Guyed mast	UHF/VHF-transmission	United States	Albert, Texas		30°08′13.7″N 98°36′36.1″W
Galich TV Mast	350 m (1,148 ft)	1991	Guyed mast	UHF/VHF-transmission	Russia	Galich		58°26′30″N 42°37′38″E
Belyy Yar TV Mast	350 m (1,148 ft)	?	Guyed mast	UHF/VHF-transmission	Russia	Belyy Yar		61°16′6.93″N 73°14′9.45″E
Polykovichi TV Mast	350 m (1,148 ft)	?	Guyed mast	UHF/VHF-transmission	Belarus	Mahilyow/Polykovichi		53°59′25.22″N 30°19′38.54″E
Novaya Strazha TV Mast	350 m (1,148 ft)	?	Guyed mast	UHF/VHF-transmission	Belarus	Slonim		53°03′51″N 25°28′30″E
Smetanichi TV Mast	350 m (1,148 ft)	?	Guyed mast	UHF/VHF-transmission	Belarus	Smetanichi		52°13′27.87″N 28°30′44.4″E
Novaya TV Mast	350 m (1,148 ft)	?	Guyed mast	UHF/VHF-transmission	Kazakhstan	Karaganda		49°56′07.36″N 73°03′06.41″E
Alexandrovsk-Sakhalinsky CHAYKA-Mast	350 m (1,148 ft)	?	Guyed mast	LF-transmission	Russia	Soboli		51°4′42.805″N 142°42′4.952″E
Petropavlovsk-Kamchatsky CHAYKA-Mast	350 m (1,148 ft)	?	Guyed mast	LF-transmission	Russia	Sokoch		53°7′48.26″N 157°41′49.1″E
Ussuriysk CHAYKA-Mast	350 m (1,148 ft)	?	Guyed mast	LF-transmission	Russia	Pad' Levaja		44°31′58.24″N 131°38′28.6″E
HWU transmitter, central mast	350 m (1,148 ft)	?	Guyed mast	VLF-transmission	France	Rosnay	multiple masts	46°42′47.49″N 1°14′42.22″E

== On hold/cancelled or proposed ==
Building stopped construction
Building never completed
Building approved/under construction
Building proposed

Structures that are on hold, have been cancelled or have been proposed.

Name	Height	Country	City	Const. start	Remarks
Riyadh Rise Tower	2000 metres (6561 ft)	Saudi Arabia	Riyadh	2023	proposed
Azerbaijan Tower	1,051 metres (3,448 ft)	Azerbaijan	Baku	2025	cancelled
Sky City 1000	1000 metres (3,300 ft)	Japan	Tokyo	1989	proposed
Oblisco Capitale	1,000 metres (3,300 ft)	Egypt	Cairo	2024	on hold
Nakheel Tower	1,000 metres (3,300 ft)	United Arab Emirates	Dubai	2008	cancelled
Sky City	838 metres (2,749 ft)	China	Changsha	2013	cancelled
Dubai Creek Tower	828 metres (2,717 ft)+	United Arab Emirates	Dubai	2016	on hold
BUMN Tower	700 metres (2,300 ft)	Indonesia	Nusantara	2020	approved
Tower M	700 metres (2,300 ft)	Malaysia	Kuala Lumpur	2019	on hold
India Tower	700 metres (2,300 ft)	India	Mumbai	2010	cancelled
Eaton's / John Maryon Tower	686 metres (2,251 ft)	Canada	Toronto	1971	cancelled
Pagcor Tower	655 metres (2,149 ft)	Philippines	Manila	2010	cancelled
Rama IX Super Tower	615 metres (2,018 ft)	Thailand	Bangkok	2017	cancelled
Russia Tower	612 metres (2,008 ft)	Russia	Moscow	2007	cancelled
Hyundai Global Business Center	569 metres (1,867 ft)	South Korea	Seoul	2020	on hold
Grollo Tower	560 metres (1,840 ft)	Australia	Melbourne	2001	cancelled
Doha Convention Center Tower	551 metres (1,808 ft)	Qatar	Doha	2007	cancelled
Dalian Greenland Center	518 metres (1,699 ft)	China	Dalian	2014	on hold
Evergrande IFC 1	518 m (1,699 ft)	China	Hefei	2016	on hold
Busan Lotte World Tower	510.1 metres (1,674 ft)	South Korea	Busan	2011	cancelled
Burj Al Alam	510 metres (1,670 ft)	United Arab Emirates	Dubai	2006	cancelled

== See also ==
- List of tallest buildings
- List of tallest freestanding structures
- List of tallest statues
- History of the world's tallest buildings
- History of the world's tallest structures
- Tallest structures by category
- List of visionary tall buildings and structures
