= WIS TV Tower =

WIS TV Tower is a 465.1-metre-high (1,526 ft) guy-wired aerial mast for the transmission of FM radio and television programs in Lugoff, South Carolina, United States (Geographical coordinates: ). WIS TV Tower was built in 1958, replacing the original 1953 tower. When the 1958 tower was built by Kline Iron and Steel of Columbia, S.C., it was the "highest man-made structure east of the Mississippi," and allowed WIS-TV to increase its coverage area from 29 counties to 41 counties.

== See also ==
- WIS (TV)
- List of masts
