= Exclusive economic zone of the United States =

The United States has the world's second largest exclusive economic zone (EEZ) after France. The total size is 11,351,000 km^{2} (4,383,000 sq mi)^{2}. Areas of its EEZ are located in three oceans, the Gulf of Mexico, and the Caribbean Sea including Puerto Rico in the North Atlantic Ocean. Most notable areas are Alaska, Hawaii, the East Coast, West Coast and Gulf Coast of the United States.

== Geography ==
Exclusive economic zone map

The EEZ borders with Russia to the north west, Canada to the north, Cuba, Bahamas, Mexico to the south, Dominican Republic, British Virgin Islands, Anguilla to the south east and Samoa, Niue to the south west. The unincorporated territories of Guam, Puerto Rico, U.S. Virgin Islands and Northern Mariana Islands are included.

The EEZ (including territorial sea) areas of the territories of the U.S. (in decreasing size)
Territory	EEZ area (km^{2})	EEZ area (sq mi)	Notes
Alaska	3,770,021	1,455,613	A non-contiguous state in the northwest extremity of the North American continent.
Hawaii – Northwestern Islands	1,579,538	609,863	Including Midway Atoll, these islands form the Leeward Islands of the Hawaiian island chain.
U.S. East Coast	915,763	353,578	The mainland coastal states of the Eastern United States.
Hawaii – Southeastern Islands	895,346	345,695	These islands form the Windward Islands of the Hawaiian island chain.
U.S. West Coast	825,549	318,746	The mainland coastal states of the Western United States.
Northern Mariana Islands	749,268	289,294	An organized unincorporated Commonwealth of the United States.
U.S. Gulf Coast	707,832	273,295	The mainland coastal states of the Southern United States.
Johnston Atoll	442,635	170,902	A National Wildlife Refuge in the U.S. Minor Outlying Islands.
Howland and Baker Islands	434,921	167,924	Including Howland Island and Baker Island, both territories are National Wildlife Refuges in the U.S. Minor Outlying Islands.
Wake Island	407,241	157,237	A National Wildlife Refuge in the U.S. Minor Outlying Islands.
American Samoa	404,391	156,136	The only inhabited unorganized unincorporated territory of the United States.
Palmyra Atoll and Kingman Reef	352,300	136,000	Both territories are National Wildlife Refuges in the U.S. Minor Outlying Islands.
Jarvis Island	316,665	122,265	A National Wildlife Refuge in the U.S. Minor Outlying Islands.
Guam	221,504	85,523	An organized unincorporated territory of the United States.
Puerto Rico	177,685	68,605	An organized unincorporated Commonwealth of the United States.
U.S. Virgin Islands	33,744	13,029	An organized unincorporated territory of the United States.
Navassa Island	N/A (Note: The source does not provide any data for Navassa Island even though the U.S. government did claim an EEZ area for this disputed territory.)	N/A	A National Wildlife Refuge in the U.S. Minor Outlying Islands.
Total	11,351,000	4,383,000	

== Disputes ==
=== Active ===
==== Canada ====
A wedge-shaped section of the Beaufort Sea is disputed between Canada and the United States, because the area reportedly contains substantial oil reserves.

==== Dominican Republic ====
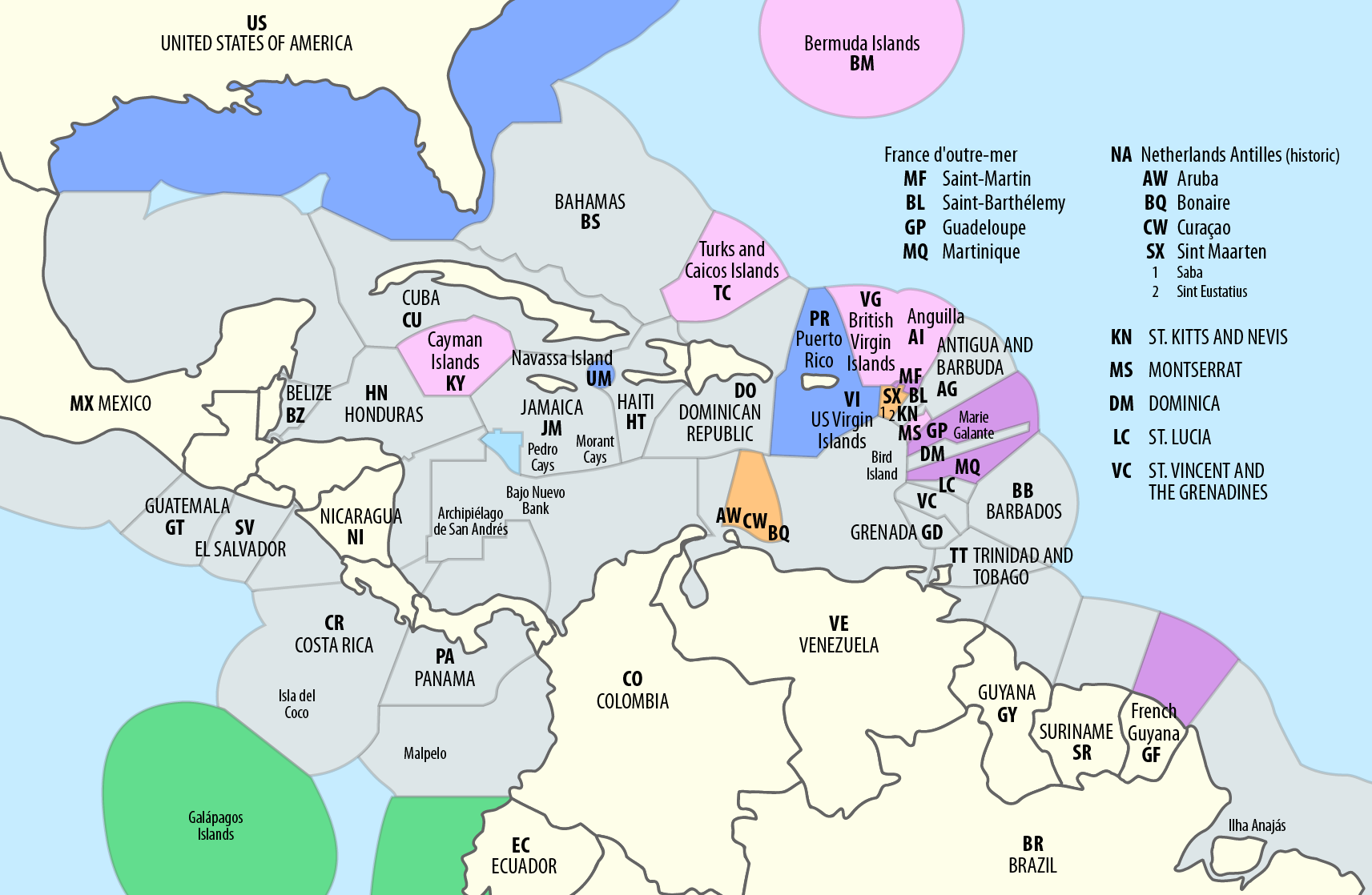
EEZs in the Caribbean Sea, with American zones shaded in blue

Since 2007, the Dominican Republic in Hispaniola considers itself an archipelagic state, encroaching the long-established median or equidistance line dividing the EEZ of the Dominican Republic and Puerto Rico, and claiming portion of the EEZ claimed by the United States in relation to the archipelago of Puerto Rico, which is itself an unincorporated U.S. territory. The United States does not accept the archipelagic status and maritime boundaries claimed by the Dominican Republic. Victor Prescott, an authority in the field of maritime boundaries, argued that, as the coasts of both states are short coastlines with few offshore islands, an equidistance line is appropriate.

== See also ==
- Magnuson–Stevens Fishery Conservation and Management Act
- Geography of the United States
- Exclusive economic zone of Canada
- Exclusive economic zone of Mexico
