= Capitol Broadcasting Tower Columbia =

TV transmission tower in North Carolina, US

Capitol Broadcasting Tower Broadway is a 533.1-metre-high (1,749 ft) guyed tower for TV transmission near Broadway, North Carolina, United States, at . Capitol Broadcasting Tower was built in 2002–2003 and replaced the Capitol Broadcasting Tower Broadway damaged in a plane crash.

The tower which it replaced () was also 533.1 metre high guyed tower for TV transmission built in 1985. It broadcast the signal of now defunct WKFT TV 40 licensed to Fayetteville and is utilized as an auxiliary broadcast tower for in Raleigh.

The tower was destroyed when it was struck by a single-engine Piper courier plane flown by 27-year-old David C. Dollar of Durham, North Carolina on March 14, 2002, resulting in his death. The tower was rebuilt by Capitol Broadcasting and the transmitter, antenna and transmission line were replaced by Bahakel Communications, owner of WKFT at the time. WKFT was sold to Univision and rebranded as WUVC shortly after the tower was replaced.

The tower was (and still is) located near the Harnett–Lee County border. The tower is actually in Harnett County while one guy anchor point and the actual town of Broadway are in Lee County.
