= Galich transmitter =

Unfinished broadcasting facility in Russia

Coordinates: 58.4414°N 42.6271°E

The Galich Transmitter was an unfinished facility for FM and TV broadcasting near Galich in Russia at 58°26'27"N 42°37'43"E. The 350 meter (1,150 feet) tall mast was built in 1991 as a lattice steel structure with square cross section, guyed in 4 directions. However, the nearby transmitter building remained unfinished due to the fall of the Soviet Union and subsequent financial difficulties.

In spite of its height, the mast of the Galich transmitter did not carry any working air-traffic obstacle lights. It was the tallest never-used man-made structure in Europe. It was a popular site for free-climbers, BASE jumpers and urban explorers.

The mast and transmitter building were demolished in 2017.
