= WTVY-TV Tower =

Telecommunications tower in the United States

Coordinates: 30°55′11″N 85°44′30″W

The WTVY-TV Tower is a 1,849 ft (563 m) tall structure located in Bethlehem, Florida (1983 ft / 604 m above sea level). Erected in 1978 by WTVY channel 4 (CBS) in Dothan, Alabama, it is the tallest structure and the highest point in the state of Florida. WTVY previously utilized a 1,209 ft (368.5 m) tower located 5 miles east of Dothan in the Webb community. The old tower is still home to WTVY-FM. The new tower enables WTVY-TV to broadcast an omnidirectional signal for 80 miles which covers most of the Florida panhandle, south Alabama, and southwest Georgia.

In 1988, WDJR-FM located their antenna at the 1,500 ft (457 m) mark but had to relocate due to weight issues caused by the transition to digital TV and an extra antenna being needed by WTVY. In 2013, WRGX, the new NBC affiliate and sister station to WTVY began broadcasting from the tower at the 1,500 ft (457 m) mark.
