= List of catastrophic collapses of broadcast masts and towers =

This is a list of catastrophic collapses of broadcast masts and towers.

Masts and towers can collapse as a result of natural disasters, such as storms and fires; from engineering defects; and from accidents, sabotage or warfare.

== List of collapses ==
Location	Date	Mode of construction	Height (meters)	Reason for collapse	Remarks
Poldhu, Cornwall, England	September 17, 1901	20 wooden poles arranged in a circle	64	Storm	Identical design to South Wellfleet installation. Replaced by 4 free-standing wooden lattice towers
South Wellfleet, Cape Cod, Massachusetts, United States	November 25, 1901	20 wooden poles arranged in a circle	64	Storm	Identical design to Poldhu installation. Replaced by 4 free-standing wooden lattice towers.
Machrihanish, Scotland	December 5, 1906	Guyed steel tubular mast	128	Storm	Used for transatlantic communication with Brant Rock, Massachusetts, U.S. Never replaced.
Nauen, Germany	March 30, 1912	Guyed steel lattice mast	200	Storm	Was the oldest continuously operating radio transmitting installation in the world.
Java, Dutch East Indies (modern-day Indonesia)	1923	?	?	Lightning	
Norddeich, Germany	November 25, 1925	Guyed steel lattice mast	?	Storm	Three towers collapsed
Place of Magdeburg Transmitter, Berlin, Germany	July 1926	Guyed mast on roof top	?	Guy cable rusted through	
Western mast of Zeesen transmitter, Zeesen, Germany	1927	Guyed steel lattice mast	210	Collapse at construction	
Munich-Stadelheim, Germany	November 23, 1930	Free standing wood lattice tower	75	Storm	Two towers snapped off 25 metres above ground
Langenberg, Germany	October 10, 1935	Free standing wood lattice tower	150	Tornado	Replaced by triangle antenna
Liechtenstein-Haberfeld transmitter	November 21, 1938			Storm	
Utbremen Radio Tower, Bremen, Germany	1939	Free standing wood lattice tower	90	Lightning	Replaced by steel tower
Radio Normandie Transmitter, Tower West, Fécamp, France	November 7, 1940	Free standing lattice tower	113	Storm	
Langenberg, Germany	1949	Guyed steel tube mast	51	Storm	Two masts of a triangle aerial
Schwerin-Möwenburgstrasse transmitter, Schwerin, Germany	February 10, 1949	Guyed steel lattice mast	120	Storm	
Hamburg-Billwerder, West Germany	December 1949	Guyed steel lattice mast	198	Storm	Partial destruction of a guyed mast under construction
Augusta, Michigan	November 30, 1953	Guyed steel tube mast		Aircraft collision	Former Michigan Governor Kim Sigler, who was piloting the plane, and three passengers were killed.
Pittsburgh, Pennsylvania	March 11, 1955	Steel lattice mast		Windstorm	WENS television. The lower part of the tower is still visible and in use.
Nicosia, Cyprus	1955			Sabotage	Destroyed by EOKA rebels
WOAI, Selma, Texas	April 3, 1956	Guyed steel lattice mast	100	Aircraft collision	Hit by a B-29.
Ochsenkopf, West Germany	January 1958	Guyed steel tube mast	50	Ice	Replaced by concrete tower
KAYS-TV Tower, Hays, Kansas	May 29, 1959	Guyed steel tube mast	224	Storm with 105 kt winds	Top 150 m of the tower toppled. Replaced within three months by a mast 251 m tall.
KOBR-TV Tower, Caprock, New Mexico	1960	Guyed lattice steel mast	491	Storm	Replaced by new mast of same height
LORAN-C location transmitter, Carolina Beach, North Carolina, US	1961	Lattice Tower	191	Storm	Tower buckled at 2/3 of height. Tower carried radials (wires attached radially in a horizontal plane) on its top although it was not designed for them.
Villebon-sur-Yvette, France	December 10, 1961	Guyed steel lattice mast	?	Terrorism	
LORAN-C transmitter Ejde, Ejde, Faroe Islands	1962	Guyed steel lattice mast	190	Material fault	Slip of guy
KGW Tower, Portland, Oregon, US	October 12, 1962	Guyed steel lattice mast	180	Storm	Columbus Day Storm of 1962
Angissq LORAN-C transmitter, Angissq, Greenland	July 27, 1964	Guyed steel lattice mast	411	Material fault	Replaced by a 214 m (704 ft)) tall mast radiator
Yap LORAN-C transmitter, Yap Island, Trust Territory of the Pacific Islands (modern-day Micronesia)	1964	Guyed steel lattice mast	305	Collapsed during construction	
Iwo Jima LORAN-C transmitter, Japan	1965	Guyed steel lattice mast	411	Maintenance work	The collapsing mast also destroyed the transmitter building. Six persons were killed.
SES8 Tower, Mount Burr, South Australia,	1965	Guyed steel lattice mast	200	Structural failure during guy wire tension testing	
KXJB-TV mast, Galesburg, North Dakota	February 14, 1968	Guyed steel lattice mast	628	Helicopter collision	
WLBT Tower, Raymond, Mississippi	March 3, 1966	Guyed steel lattice	487	F5 tornado	Replaced with 609.3 m tower which collapsed in 1997
KBIM-TV, at Caprock, New Mexico	April 1, 1966	unknown	411	Unknown	
XHI-TV Tower, Ciudad Obregón, Mexico	September 28, 1966	?	200	Hurricane Kristen	Replaced with a temporary tower; station relocated to Yucuribampo Hill
Waltham mast, UK	November 17, 1966	Guyed tubular steel mast	290	Storm	High winds caused oscillations in the mast structure
WNBC-AM, WCBS-AM, at High Island, New York,	August 27, 1967	Guyed lattice steel mast	161	Aircraft collision	
KELO TV Tower, Rowena, South Dakota	June 24, 1968	Guyed steel lattice mast	609	Airplane collision during thunderstorm	
WAEO Tower, Starks, Wisconsin	November 17, 1968	Guyed steel lattice mast	524	Collapse due to plane collision with guy wire	
Marnach, Luxembourg	January 17, 1969		?	Plane crash	?
Emley Moor, Great Britain	March 19, 1969	Guyed tubular steel mast	385	Ice	Replaced by 330 m free-standing concrete tower
Orlunda, Sweden	July 12, 1970	Guyed steel lattice mast	250	Lightning	The base insulator was destroyed
KOIN-TV Towers, Portland, Oregon	February 28, 1971	Guyed steel lattice mast	305 & 213	Ice	Two towers collapsed
KSTP-TV and WCCO-TV, Shoreview, Minnesota	September 7, 1971	Guyed steel lattice mast	411	Structural failure during construction	Seven technicians were killed while lifting the first of three large antenna sections into place at the top of the tower.
Königs Wusterhausen, East Germany	November 15, 1972	Lattice steel tower	243	Storm	
Bithlo (near Orlando), Florida, US	June 8, 1973	Guyed Steel Tower	457	Removal of load-bearing diagonals during FM antenna installation	Multi-station tower supporting antennas of TV stations WDBO-TV, WFTV, and WMFE-TV, and radio stations WDBO-FM and WDIZ-FM – two workers on tower killed
KCRG-TV Tower Walker, Iowa	October 4, 1973	Guyed Steel Tower	598	Tower modifications	Tower being modified prior to installation of Iowa Public Television side-mounted antenna – five workers on tower site killed
TV Mast Brest - Roc'h Trédudon, France	February 1974	Guyed steel lattice mast	218	Terrorism	A slightly higher tower, 225 m, has been built since.
KELO TV Tower, Rowena, South Dakota, US	1975	Guyed steel lattice mast	610	Blizzard	
Sendemast SL3, Burg bei Magdeburg, East Germany	February 18, 1976	Guyed steel lattice mast	350	Material fault	
Pic de Nore transmitter, Pic de Nore, France	December 2, 1976	Concrete tower	80	Storm	Storm tore pinnacle down
CKVR Television Tower, Barrie, Ontario, Canada	September 7, 1977	Guyed steel lattice mast	305	Aircraft collision	
KSLA-TV Tower, Mooringsport, LA	October 8, 1977	Guyed steel lattice mast	521	Undetermined	1709 feet HAAT. Erected November 17, 1964. Had elevator, RCA Travelling Wave pylon antenna for Channel 12 (System M), land mobile antennas, all lost. RCA contractor for erection, stainless subcontractor. No definitive cause ever found for collapse. Speculation of "galloping guy lines" (mechanical standing waves in one of the guys), causing stress-to-failure in the guys due to rapidly alternating strain.
TV mast of Shaanxi No.9 Transmitting Station, Chang'an, Xi'an, Shaanxi, China	December 16, 1977	Guyed steel tubular mast	26	Ice	
WJJY TV Mast, Bluffs, IL	March 26, 1978	Guyed steel lattice mast	491	24 two-inch coupling bolts connecting the second and third sections of the tower snapped due to ice formation	In August 1969. This tower was one of the three tallest structures in the Northern Hemisphere and its transmitter radiated the most powerful UHF-TV signal in the world. TV channel 14 (470-476 MHz). Collapsed Easter Sunday. 39°45′31″N 90°31′8″W
WAND TV Tower, Decatur	March 26, 1978	Guyed steel lattice mast	400	Upper section of antenna broke loose and destroyed guy wires due to ice storm	WAND and WJJY used the same RCA UHF antennas, mfg in 1969. TV channel 17 (488-494 MHz) Collapsed Easter Sunday.
Nebraska Education Tower, Angora	February 1978	Guyed steel lattice mast	457	Ice	
Zehlendorf bei Oranienburg, East Germany	May 21, 1978	Guyed steel lattice mast	352	Aircraft collision	
Vysílač Krašov, Bezvěrov, Czechoslovakia	1979	Guyed mast of lattice steel	305	Ice	Mast was predamaged
Blåbärskullen transmitter, Sunne, Sweden	December 27, 1979	Guyed mast of lattice steel	323	Ice	Pinnacle with broadcasting antennas fell down, height afterwards 274 metres
LORAN-C transmitter Jan Mayen, Jan Mayen, Norway	October 8, 1980	Guyed mast of lattice steel	190	Ice	Guy supports were improperly installed
Delimora Transmitter, Malta		Guyed mast of lattice steel	88	Melting of guy supports	The guy wires were made of polymer, which melted as a result of a high electric field strength storm
Dudelange Radio Tower, Luxembourg	July 31, 1981	Lattice steel tower	285	Aircraft collision	Debris of the tower killed a couple in a house near the tower.
WWAY tower, Winnabow, North Carolina	1981	Lattice steel tower	?	Aircraft collision	Hit by a military jet. Replaced with one nearly 2,000 feet (610 m) tall.
WCIQ Tower, Mount Cheaha, Alabama	January 1982	Guyed steel lattice mast	?	Ice storm	
main mast of Shaanxi No.10 Transmitting Station, Chunhua, Xianyang, Shaanxi, China	May 2, 1982	Guyed steel lattice mast	129	High winds and corrosion	
Senior Road Tower, Missouri City, Texas, US	December 7, 1982	Guyed steel lattice mast	569	Guy support wire severed	Total collapse during installation of 6-ton FM antenna on new 1800 ft. tower. Five technicians killed: two on the hoist riding the FM antenna up and three on the tower. Determined insufficient sized bolts on the makeshift lifting lug extension failed. The falling debris severed one of the tower's guy wires which caused the tower to whip back and forth and collapse.
KANU tower, Lawrence, KS	December 11, 1982	Guyed steel lattice mast	184	Sabotage	Guy wires severed
CKX-TV Craig Television Tower, Canada	1983	Guyed mast	412	Ice	
TV mast Wavre, Belgium	October 13, 1983	Guyed mast	315	Storm	
KWWL, Rowley, Iowa	November 28, 1983	Guyed steel lattice mast	610	Ice	
Bielstein, West Germany	January 15, 1985	Guyed steel tube mast	298	Ice	
San Francisco, CA, US - Candlestick Hill	February 14, 1986	Self-supporting tower	137	High wind	KYA transmitter placed in service in 1937. Failure may have resulted from tower leg insulator replacement where all-thread rod was not long enough to fully engage securing nut.
Caroline 558 and Radio Monique mast, aboard MV Ross Revenge, off English coast	November 25, 1987	Lattice steel tower	92	Force 8 storm	Tallest ever mast aboard any ship. It was replaced by horizontal wire antenna between two shorter masts.
KTUL Tower Coweta, OK	December 26, 1987	Lattice steel guyed tower	582	Ice storm	Listed at 1909 feet
a mast in NRTA Transmitting Station 501, Anning, Kunming, Yunnan, China	January 1988	Guyed steel lattice mast	143.5	Material fault and high winds	
KTVO-TV Tower, Colony, Missouri	June 2, 1988	Guyed steel lattice mast	610	Maintenance	Crew was replacing cross support beams at the 200 meter level. The mast broke at that spot, the bottom 200 meters fell to the south, the top fell straight down. All three workers on the mast were killed.
Zhumadian Prefecture TV & FM Relay Station, Zhumadian, Zhumadian Prefecture, Henan, China	January 10, 1989	Guyed steel lattice mast	55	Ice storm	
KGO (AM) towers Newark, California	October 17, 1989	?	91	Earthquake	Three towers damaged
WRAL-TV & WPTF-TV towers, Auburn	December 1989	Two guyed steel tube framework masts	609	Ice	Unusually heavy ice concentrated at top predominantly on one side of towers caused asymmetrical load. Dislodged essentially as one piece during rapid warming; sudden unloading caused dynamic failure.
Minnkota power cooperative, near Langdon, North Dakota, US	September 25, 1990	guyed steel triangular tower	107	Underground corrosion of guy wire steel and anchor shaft	Two tower service personnel were seriously injured
RÚV long wave radio mast, Vatnsendahæð, Reykjavik, Iceland	February 3, 1991	Guyed steel lattice mast	150	Storm	
WDIO-TV Duluth, Minnesota, US	March 23, 1991	Guyed steel triangular tower	259	Ice and high wind	Freezing rain, accompanied at time with thunder, coated the city of Duluth with as much as six inches of ice. The 850-foot WDIO-TV tower was toppled as winds gusted to 40 mph, buffeting the heavily ice-covered tower. The tower fell onto a nearby utility line which provided power to the remainder of Duluth's television and FM radio stations, and all but one AM radio station. Telephone and power lines snapped leaving Duluth and many northeastern Minnesota communities without utility services for 24 hours. The DNR reported that four million pine trees were damaged or destroyed. - NOAA NWS Duluth, MN
Hekou MW Transmitting Station, Hekou, Honghe, Yunnan, China	May 8, 1991	Guyed steel lattice mast	133.5	High winds	
Warsaw radio mast, Konstantynów, Poland	August 8, 1991	Guyed steel tube framework mast	648	Maintenance	Replacement by facility in Solec Kujawski
Kuruk-tagh Relay Station, Korla, Bayingolin, Xinjiang, China	September 13, 1991	Lattice steel tower	60	High winds	
WCIX TV Tower Homestead, Florida	August 25, 1992	Guyed steel tower	549	Hurricane Andrew	Rebuilt by LeBlanc Tower of Canada
COMMSTA Miami	1992	Guyed mast (insulated)	91	Hurricane Andrew	Collapse of 2 masts
Cape Race LORAN-C transmitter, Cape Race, Canada	February 2, 1993	Guyed steel lattice mast	411	Material fault	Fatigue failure of the eyebolt head in a compression cone insulator on structural guy caused swing-in damage, which resulted in structural collapse
LORAN-C transmitter Kargaburan, Kargaburan, Turkey	February 25, 1993	Guyed steel lattice mast	191	Snowstorm	Tower had construction faults
WCOV-TV Tower, Montgomery, Alabama, US	March 6, 1996	?	242	Tornado	
Yosami Transmitting Station mast No.8, Kariya, Aichi, Japan	August 29, 1996	Guyed steel lattice mast	250	Structural failure during dismantling	One worker was killed and four workers were injured.
Langenberg, Germany	September 2, 1996	Guyed steel lattice mast	160	Maintenance	
KXTX-TV Tower Cedar Hill, Texas	October 12, 1996	Guyed steel tower	468	Maintenance for DTV install	Three died when tower collapsed after a gin pole ran off its track and snapped a guy wire
Grigoriopol transmitter, Moldova	1997	Guyed steel lattice mast	350	Ice	Two masts collapsed
Grigoriopol transmitter, Moldova	1997	Guyed steel lattice mast	250	Ice	Two masts collapsed
KXJB-TV mast, North Dakota, US	April 6, 1997	Guyed steel lattice mast	628	Ice	
KNOE-TV Tower, Columbia, Louisiana	March 20, 1997	Guyed steel lattice mast	606	Maintenance	One killed, two injured when workers failed to install temporary braces
WLBT Tower, Raymond, Mississippi	October 23, 1997	Guyed steel lattice	609	Maintenance	Three killed - temporary braces failed during HDTV antenna upgrade
Sakaide Transmission Tower, Kagawa Prefecture, Shikoku Island, Japan	February 20, 1998	Steel lattice	73	Vandalism, possible sabotage	76 bolts were removed without authorization from the base of the tower. The perpetrator has not been identified to this date.
WKY-AM-TV Tower, Oklahoma City, Oklahoma, US	June 13, 1998	Guyed mast	293	Tornado	
TV Tower Avala, Serbia	April 30, 1999	Concrete tower (with observation deck)	203	Air raid (NATO bombardment during the Kosovo war)	
Bozhou Educational TV Tower, Xuege Subdistrict, Bozhou, Anhui, China	August 30, 1999	Square lattice roof top tower	98 (40 + 58 (building + tower))	Storm	The tower on the roof collapsed to street. Two persons were killed.
WMBD AM radio tower, Peoria, Illinois, US	April 20, 2000			Thunderstorm winds	Early morning thunderstorm wind event with estimated damage of $500,000
WRMD-Tower, St. Petersburg, Florida, US	April 25, 2000	Guyed steel lattice mast	198	Helicopter crash	Three died when a medical helicopter hit a guy wire in clear weather and crashed
WNWI 1080-Towers, Oak Lawn (Chicago), Illinois, US	July 9, 2000	Guyed steel lattice mast	61	Sabotage	Two towers collapsed
KXEO/KWWR-Tower, Mexico, MO, US	August 23, 2000	Guyed steel lattice mast	123	Storm	
Linquan Radio & TV Transmitting Station (old), Linquan, Fuyang, Anhui, China	January 1, 2001	Guyed steel lattice mast	103	Structural failure during dismantling	Two workers were killed, and one worker was seriously injured.
CBC Tower, Shawinigan, QC, Canada	April 27, 2001	Guyed steel lattice mast	331.5 (307.1 + 24.4 (structure + antenna))	Controlled implosion after aircraft crash caused serious damage five days earlier	Rebuilt in 2003, the new tower has almost the same height, i.e. 326.8 m (307.1 m for the structure, but the antenna is shorter (19.7 m)).
Angara transmitter, Northern Mast, Angara, Russia	June 6, 2001	Guyed steel lattice mast carrying a T-antenna	205	Deteriorated support guys	
World Trade Center North Tower, New York City, NY	September 11, 2001	Truses and Axis	526.8 (417 + 109.8 (roof + antenna))	Terrorist attack	Tower was destroyed as a result of the September 11 attacks in which a commercial airliner flew into the side of the building causing it and the broadcast tower to collapse under its own weight.
Krasny Bor transmitter, Russia	November 5, 2001	Guyed steel lattice mast	258	Helicopter collision	
a mast in Datong MW Transmitting Station, Yunzhou District, Datong, Shanxi, China	2001	Guyed steel lattice mast	151.5	High winds and corrosion	
WKFT, North Carolina, US	March 14, 2002	Guyed steel tower	533.1	Airplane crash	Pilot killed and the tower was destroyed
Nanxian Radio & TV Transmitting Station, Nanxian, Yiyang, Hunan, China	April 3, 2002	Free-standing steel lattice tower	100	Storm	
KDUH-TV Mast, Hemingford, Nebraska, US	September 24, 2002	Guyed steel lattice mast	599	Maintenance	Two workers killed, three injured on ground
WVAH-TV Tower, West Virginia, US	February 19, 2003	Guyed steel lattice mast	473	Ice	
WPAY-Tower, Portsmouth, Ohio, US	February 19, 2003	Guyed steel lattice mast	200	Ice	
WTNV-FM Tower, Jackson, Tennessee, US	May 4, 2003	Free-standing steel lattice tower	176	Tornado	
WMBD Tower, Peoria, Illinois, US	May 10, 2003	Free-standing steel lattice tower	?	Tornado	Collapse of three towers, following collapse of larger single tower at same site by straight-line winds on 20 April 2000
KETV TV Tower	July 2003	Guyed steel lattice mast	415	Reconstruction work	
WIFR TV tower	July 5, 2003	Guyed steel lattice mast	222	Storm (derecho)	
WAAY-TV - TV Mast, Huntsville, Alabama, US	September 4, 2003	Guyed steel lattice mast	305	unknown	Three workers killed
Utrecht, Netherlands	September 8, 2003	Guyed steel lattice mast	45		
WJDB Transmitter Grove Hill, AL	September 16, 2004	Guyed steel lattice mast	131	Hurricane Ivan	Replacement tower constructed shortly thereafter. Also knocked Clarke County, AL, Sheriff's Office off the air (KWO611)
WPMI-TV Tower, Robertsdale, Alabama, US	September 16, 2004	Guyed steel lattice mast	518	Storm	Hurricane Ivan
Peterborough, Great Britain	October 30, 2004	Guyed steel lattice mast	163	Fire (suspected vandalism)	Temporary replacement mast constructed shortly thereafter. New permanent mast entered full service in February 2006.
KFI Mast, La Mirada, CA, US	December 19, 2004	Guyed steel lattice mast	195	Aircraft collision	
WLGA Transmitter Tower (formerly WSWS-TV Transmitter Tower), Cusseta, Georgia, US	February 27, 2005	Guyed steel lattice mast	538		Replacement tower completed September 15, 2005.
Nebraska Education Tower Atlanta, Atlanta, Nebraska, US	November 25, 2005	Guyed steel lattice mast	325	Aircraft collision	All three aircraft occupants killed
KLTV-TV Mast, Tyler, TX (Red Springs, TX)	February 3, 2006	Guyed steel lattice mast	329	Undetermined	1078 feet HAAT. Erected in 1981. No definitive cause ever found for collapse. Speculation was that the collapse was directly or indirectly related to the recent installation of their digital television antenna. The collapse destroyed the tower, KLTV's analog and digital antennas, KLTV's digital transmitter, and FM station KVNE's antenna. The analog transmitter was undamaged, and within a few days was moved to KLTV's backup tower in east Tyler. The collapse occurred the day after Raycom Media officially took ownership of the station.
WALB-TV Mast, Doerun, GA	June 1, 2006	Guyed steel lattice mast	?	Demolition mishap	While the tower for then-sister station WFXL, which had been damaged by a collision with a military helicopter, was being imploded, one of the tower's guy wires wrapped around one for WALB's tower, as feared by engineers prior to the implosion. As a result, WALB's tower collapsed. A new tower for both WALB and WFXL was later constructed, which began broadcasting on July 3, 2007, at 11:35 p.m.
Torre VIP de Rádio & TV, São Bernardo do Campo, Brazil	August 23, 2006	Guyed steel lattice mast	174	Maintenance	One person was killed
WACS-TV tower	March 1, 2007	Guyed steel lattice mast	329	EF3 tornado	Americus, Georgia, was struck by the tornado a few minutes later
WSKY-DT Tower, Camden County, NC, US	March 2, 2007	Guyed steel lattice mast	230	Guy wire anchor failure	Under construction. Also destroyed transmitter building. Was planned for a height of 1,036 ft (315.77 m).
WCFE-DT, Clinton, County, NY, US	April 18, 2007	Guyed steel tower	136	Structural failure	400-foot transmitter tower located on Averil Peak, NY completely collapsed as a result of accumulation of ice and snow from the April 2007 Nor'easter. Partially damaged the transmitter building at the base. New tower erected and back in service Oct, 9 2007.
Browns Summit Crown Castle Broadcasting Tower, Browns Summit, Texas, US	May 29, 2007	Guyed steel lattice mast	244	Restoration work	
WNEP-TV Tower, Penobscot Knob Pennsylvania	December 16, 2007	Guyed steel lattice mast	244	Ice	Also damaged transmitter building and doppler radar.
WVIA-TV Tower, Penobscot Knob	December 16, 2007	Guyed steel lattice mast	510	Ice	300 ft. section lost from top of tower
KATV-TV Tower, Redfield, Jefferson County, US	January 11, 2008	Guyed steel lattice mast	609	Maintenance	Restringing guy wires
a mast in Inner Mongolia Transmitting Station 610, Tumed Left Banner, Hohhot, Inner Mongolia, China	May 2008	Guyed steel lattice mast	156	High winds	
Emmis Television Wichita Tower	March 28, 2009	Guyed steel lattice mast	326	Ice	
2QN Tower, Deniliquin, New South Wales, Australia	June 30, 2009	Guyed steel lattice mast	102	Storm	Wind gust reportedly caused the mast to collapse during a severe storm
Jinzhou Radio & TV Tower, Jinzhou Town, Jinzhou, Hebei, China	July 23, 2009	Free-standing steel lattice tower	186.8	Storm	
KRKO Radio Towers	September 4, 2009	Guyed steel lattice mast	?	Terrorism	Two masts
WLHR-FM Radio Tower Lavonia, GA, US	January 30, 2010	Guyed steel lattice mast	86	Sabotage	Guyed wires cut
a MW mast and 3 SW masts in Qinghai Transmitting Station 920, Gyêgu, Yushu, Qinghai, China	April 14, 2010	Guyed steel lattice mast (MW); Guyed steel tubular mast (SW)	76 (MW) & 25 (SW)	2010 Yushu earthquake	
Laomaling Radio & TV Transmitting Station, Pingshun, Changzhi, Shanxi, China	April 26, 2010	Guyed steel lattice mast	72	High winds	
WEAU TV/Radio Tower Fairchild, WI, US	March 22, 2011	Guyed steel lattice mast	609	Ice, high winds	Weather-related
Zendstation Smilde, TV/Radio Tower, Hoogersmilde, The Netherlands	July 15, 2011	Guyed steel tube mast on concrete tower	303	Fire	Tubular steel superstructure collapsed, new steel lattice superstructure constructed (2012) on top of existing concrete base tower
Zhutiao TV Transposer Station, Niushou, Fancheng, Xiangyang, Hubei, China	July 26, 2011	Free-standing steel lattice tower	70	Storm	
LRL312 Mega 98.3, LR5 Pop Radio 101.5 and LRL317 FM Federal	October 1, 2011	Guyed	210	Fire	Fire started in a leftover deposit close to one of the guy wire anchors.
Baofeng Radio & TV Transmitting Station, Baofeng, Pingdingshan, Henan, China	March 23, 2012	Free-standing steel lattice tower	136	High winds	
Longwave transmitter Europe 1, 280 metres mast, Felsberg-Berus, Germany	August 8, 2012	Guyed steel lattice mast	280	Ragged guy wire	Pinnacle and upper sections fell down
main mast of Gwangju CBS Sillyong Transmitting Station, Gwangsan District, Gwangju, South Korea	August 28, 2012	Guyed steel lattice mast	110	Typhoon Bolaven (2012)	
Nam Dinh PTTH Transmitting Station 2, Nam Dinh, Vietnam	October 28, 2012	Free-standing steel lattice tower	180	Storm	
Boll Relay Transmitter, Oberndorf-Boll, Germany	November 2, 2012	Lattice tower	30	Truck collision	
Houston public safety radio tower	September 20, 2013	Guyed	152	Unknown	
VOV Quang Binh Transmitting Station Dong Hoi, Quang Binh, Vietnam	September 30, 2013	Free-standing steel lattice tower	150	Storm	
Karachun TV Tower, Sloviansk, Ukraine	July 1, 2014	Guyed steel lattice mast	222	Artillery shelling	During the final days of the siege of Sloviansk Ukrainian Government forces positioned on the Mount Karachun were shelled by the Russian proxies. As a result, the guy wires failed and tower collapsed. The new tower 50 m shorter was opened on December 5, 2016, in place of the destroyed one.
CRTV Mast, Logbessou, Douala, Cameroon	September 24, 2014	Guyed	200	Corrosion	Mast collapsed during replacement of corroded leg at 160 m. Four riggers killed.
Rekowo Radio Mast, Rekowo, Poland	January 2, 2015	Guyed	60	Storm	
Häglared transmitter, Borås, Sweden	May 15, 2016	Guyed mast of lattice steel	332	Sabotage	Roughly half of the mast fell after guy wires had been sabotaged.
RTI Lukang Branch north array tower T1 & T3, Lukang, Changhua, Taiwan	September 27, 2016	Free-standing steel lattice tower	125	Typhoon Megi	
Yancheng Radio & TV Transmitting Station (old), Tinghu District, Yancheng, Jiangsu, China	January 17, 2017	Free-standing steel lattice tower	135	Structural failure during dismantling	Two workers were killed.
SPR TV tower, Hermosillo, Sonora, Mexico	August 9, 2017	?	?	High winds	
Huangshan Radio & TV Station Huishan Transmitting Centre, Huangshan, Anhui, China	March 4, 2018	Free-standing steel lattice tower	64	Thunderstorm	
KOZK Ozarks Public Television, Fordland, MO	April 19, 2018	Guyed	597	Maintenance	Six workers were performing routine maintenance at 105 ft on the tower when it collapsed, one worker was killed.
Amami FM Ariya Transmitting Station, Amami, Kagoshima, Japan	September 30, 2018	Guyed steel lattice mast	30	Typhoon Trami	Replaced by a 25m steel monopole tower.
a backup mast in Fujian Transmitting Station 103 Wuliting Site, Jin'an District, Fuzhou, Fujian, China	October 18, 2019	Guyed steel lattice mast	76	Excavator collision with guy wire	
KOLN Tower, Beaver Crossing, Nebraska, USA	January 18, 2020	Guyed	500.4	Ice	Collapsed during an ice storm.
a tower in RTI Lukang Branch south array, Lukang, Changhua, Taiwan	October 17, 2022	Free-standing steel lattice tower	75	Typhoon Nesat	
a tower in RTI Lukang Branch north array, Lukang, Changhua, Taiwan	October 18, 2022	Free-standing steel lattice tower	125	Typhoon Nesat	
KDLO-TV Towers, Florence, South Dakota, USA	December 14, 2022	Guyed steel lattice mast	548.6 & 243.8	Ice	2 towers collapsed during an ice storm.
SBA Communications Tower, Houston, Texas, USA	October 20, 2024	Guyed steel lattice mast	304.5	Helicopter collision	Helicopter crashed into the tower, killing four people on board, including a young child. The aircraft warning lights on the tower had a history of not working.
south mast in GRT Yangjiang MW Relay Station, Yangjiang, Guangdong, China	September 24, 2025	Guyed steel lattice mast	76	Typhoon Ragasa	
DXWK Tower, General Santos, South Cotabato, Philippines	June 8, 2026	Guyed tube mast on roof top	?	2026 Mindanao earthquake	
