= Jeddo =

Jeddo may refer to:

- Jeddo, Japan
- Jeddo, Michigan, a populated place in St. Clair County
- Jeddo, Missouri, an unincorporated community
- Jeddo, Pennsylvania, a borough in Luzerne County
- Jeddo, Texas, a populated place in Bastrop County

== See also ==
- Yeddo, Indiana, a populated place in Fountain County
