= Bee Ridge =

Bee Ridge may refer to:

- Bee Ridge, Florida, a census-designated place
- Bee Ridge (Missouri), a landform
- Bee Ridge Township, Knox County, Missouri
