= Dortmund-Dorstfeld transmitter =

Coordinates: 51°30′41″N 7°24′41″E

The Dortmund-Dorstfeld transmitter was a temporary mediumwave broadcasting facility at the Dorstfeld coal pit in Dortmund, Germany.

The Dortmund-Dorstfeld transmitter was inaugurated on September 18, 1925. It was a T-type antenna with two wires, which was spun between two 33-metres-tall wooden guyed masts, placed in a distance of 35 metres. The facility was shut down on December 15, 1927, after the Langenberg transmitter took over.

== Literature ==
Andreas Brudnjak: Die Geschichte der deutschen Mittelwellen-Sendeanlagen von 1923 bis 1945, Funk-Verlag Hein, Dessau-Roßlau 2010, ISBN 978-3-939197-51-5, Page 96/97, 111.
