= Greensburg Township, Knox County, Missouri =

Inactive township in the American state of Missouri

Coordinates: 40.2589°N 92.2597°W

Greensburg Township is an inactive township in Knox County, in the U.S. state of Missouri.

Greensburg Township was established in 1859, taking its name from Greensburg, Missouri.
