= KTVO =

Television station in Kirksville, Missouri

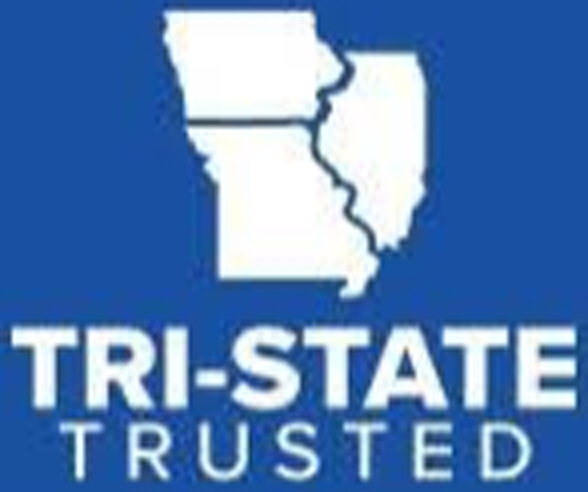

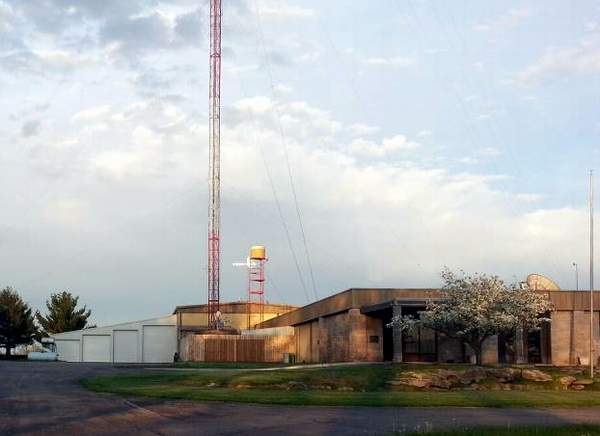
- KTVO's primary studios and business office near Kirksville, Missouri.
- Kirksville, Missouri; Ottumwa, Iowa; United States
- City: Kirksville, Missouri
- Channels: Digital: 33 (UHF); Virtual: 3
- Branding: KTVO ABC 3; Tri-State Trusted News (3.1); KTVO CBS 3 (3.2)

Programming
- Affiliations: 3.1: ABC; 3.2: CBS; for others, see § Subchannels

Ownership
- Owner: Standard Media; (Community News Media LLC)
- Sister stations: KHQA-TV (joint news operation)

History
- First air date: November 21, 1955
- Former channel numbers: Analog: 3 (VHF, 1955–2009)
- Former affiliations: CBS (primary 1955–1968, secondary 1968–1974); ABC (secondary, 1955–1968); NBC (secondary, 1955–1974)
- Call sign meaning: Kirksville Television Ottumwa

Technical information
- Licensing authority: FCC
- Facility ID: 21251
- ERP: 225 kW
- HAAT: 336 m (1,102 ft)
- Transmitter coordinates: 40°31′47″N 92°26′30″W

Links
- Public license information: Public file; LMS
- Website: ktvo.com

KTVO (channel 3) is a television station licensed to Kirksville, Missouri, United States, serving the Ottumwa, Iowa–Kirksville, Missouri market as an affiliate of ABC and CBS. Owned by Standard Media, the station maintains studios on US 63 two miles (3.2 km) north of Kirksville, with a secondary studio, news bureau and advertising sales office on South Market Street in downtown Ottumwa. Its transmitter is located northwest of Downing, Missouri, along US 136.

== History ==
When the Federal Communications Commission (FCC) lifted the "Freeze of '48"—the nationwide halt to reorganize TV frequencies—on April 14, 1952, the VHF channel 3 was assigned to the Kirksville, Missouri, market. This prime channel attracted the attention of North Missouri Broadcasting Partners, a group led by former U.S. Congressman Sam "Wat" Arnold and Sam Burk, owners of Kirksville radio station KIRX, who had already been discussing the feasibility of adding a television station to their operations. Hoping to defray the costs and risk of the new venture, in early 1953 the Kirksville group joined with another led by James J. Conroy, owner of KBIZ in Ottumwa, Iowa. In return for shares in KBIZ, the Kirksville group would allow construction of a tower and transmitter site whose signal would cover both Kirksville and Ottumwa. Following FCC approval, a 1,100-foot (340 m) tower was built near Downing, Missouri.

KTVO signed-on November 21, 1955, airing an analog signal on VHF channel 3. However, by time of sign-on the Kirksville group felt the venture held little hope for profitability and had sold all shares back to Conroy. For much of its early history KTVO was a primary CBS affiliate, although its single market status allowed it to cherry-pick the most popular programming from NBC and ABC. At first, Arnold and Burk's fears that the Ottumwa–Kirksville market was too small to support a television station were proven true, but Conroy persevered, believing southeastern Iowa and northeastern Missouri would be proud to have a locally based station. This was not a surprise, given that KTVO was the area's only channel until 1986, when KOIA-TV (channel 15, now Fox affiliate KYOU-TV) began operations.

On January 7, 1964, Conroy sold KTVO to the Post Corporation, a media conglomerate of newspapers and broadcasting properties based in Appleton, Wisconsin. The new owners renovated and expanded the KTVO facilities in Ottumwa, shared for the station's first twenty years with then co-owned KBIZ-AM 1240. On June 1, 1968, KTVO switched primary affiliation to ABC, although the station continued carrying a few CBS and NBC shows until 1974. The year 1976 brought great change to KTVO. The Post Corporation received FCC approval to erect a new 2,000-foot (610 m) tower near Colony, Missouri. This new height and location would allow KTVO's signal to reach the lucrative Quincy, Illinois–Hannibal, Missouri market while still serving its two original cities of license. As part of the upgrade KTVO's main studios were moved from Ottumwa to a newly constructed building three miles north of Kirksville, with a secondary studio remaining in Ottumwa and a news bureau to be established in Quincy. With more room to grow in their new Kirksville facility, in the early 1980s KTVO operated a short-lived, low-power UHF station, K40AI, channel 40. A large bulk of K40AI's schedule was made up of programming from the now-defunct Satellite Program Network. K40AI also re-purposed a small amount of the syndicated programming aired on KTVO at the time, such as Solid Gold. In 1984, Gillett Corporation bought the Post Corporation Stations; however, due to the FCC ownership limit of five VHF television stations that was in effect at the time, KTVO was spun off to a local telecommunications company called "Gillbro Communications". Federal Broadcasting (later Federal Enterprises) acquired the station in 1987.

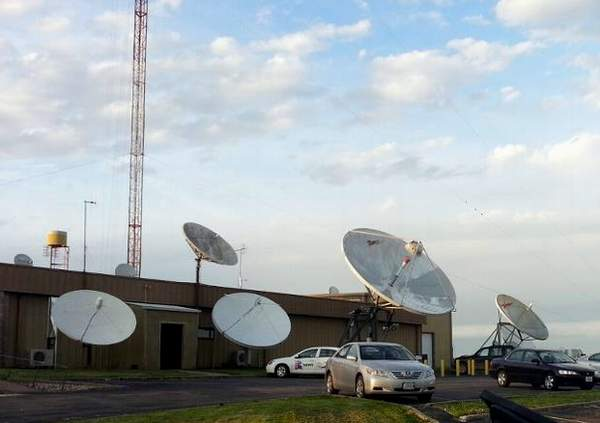
Side entrance to the KTVO newsroom and the large number of satellite dishes used by the station.

On June 2, 1988, a three-member broadcast tower maintenance crew were killed when the KTVO transmitter tower collapsed. This forced the channel, along with radio station KRXL-FM 94.5 (which had been renting antenna space on the tower) off-the-air. Since the original tower was still available, KTVO was able to resume broadcasting within thirty hours of the collapse. An Occupational Safety and Health Administration (OSHA) investigation placed official blame for the tower collapse primarily on the maintenance crew, citing the removal of too many tower cross-braces at once for repair. Although a relatively new structure, the steel cross-braces had already shown signs of cracking, rust, and other deterioration thus necessitating the early repair and maintenance.

KTVO, along with the rest of Federal, was acquired by Raycom Media in 1996. On April 28, 1999, KTVO launched its website. In December 2003, Raycom acquired the television stations of Waitt Media, which included KYOU. However, due to FCC duopoly regulations, KYOU was transferred to Ottumwa Media Holdings, LLC and entered into a local marketing agreement (LMA) with KTVO. On March 27, 2006, the company announced that it would sell KTVO along with thirteen other stations across the country to Barrington Broadcasting. The sale closed that August. As a result, KYOU's owner, Ottumwa Media Holdings, was renamed American Spirit Media and the LMA dissolved.

KTVO had been serving the Quincy–Hannibal–Keokuk, Iowa market as the default analog ABC affiliate on cable with some locations being able pick up its over-the-air signal. On August 28, 2007, sister station KHQA (which had served as CBS' affiliate of record in the Kirksville market after 1974) announced that they would launch a new second digital subchannel to offer ABC programming beginning September 30. However, KTVO remains on area cable systems, and launched a CBS-affiliated second digital subchannel on May 15, 2010, effectively marking the network's return to the area after a 36-year absence. Like KHQA-DT2, KTVO-DT2 originally offered America One as a secondary affiliate but has since added syndicated programming to its schedule. On February 28, 2013, Barrington Broadcasting announced the sale of its entire group, including KTVO, to Sinclair Broadcast Group. The sale was completed on November 25. In November 2015, KTVO celebrated the 60th anniversary of its original airdate.

On November 7, 2024, it was announced that KTVO and KHQA would merge their news departments into a new operation called Tri-State Trusted, which would cover both the Ottumwa–Kirksville and Quincy–Hannibal–Keokuk markets. Newscasts would originate from the KTVO studios but also feature local content produced by KHQA. The new operation launched with the morning newscast on December 9.

On March 11, 2025, it was reported that Sinclair was selling five TV stations, including KTVO and KHQA, to Rincon Broadcasting Group, led by Todd Parkin. The sale was approved by the FCC on July 1, and completed on July 9. In March 2026, Community News Media LLC, which operates as Standard Media Group and is led by Soohyung Kim with Deborah McDermott as chief executive, agreed to acquire Rincon Broadcasting's stations, including KTVO, for $116.5 million; the sale was completed on October 1.

== Programming ==
KTVO's second digital subchannel airs an alternate live feed of the CBS Evening News at 6 p.m. This is unlike most CBS affiliates in the Central Time Zone, which normally air the newscast at 5:30 p.m.

=== News operation ===
KTVO was the primary local source of newscasts until 1990 when Fox affiliate KOIA-TV began five-minute mini-newscasts which continued until 1991. On November 2, 2015, that station, now KYOU-TV, launched a 9 p.m. newscast. KTVO shares resources with sister station KHQA and with other Sinclair-owned stations to provide additional coverage. In addition to its main studios, KTVO operates a bureau on South Market Street in Downtown Ottumwa which is just around the corner from the original studios. KTVO-DT2 aired a Southeastern Iowa-focused newscast on weeknights called KTVO CBS 3.2 News at 6:30 originating from the Ottumwa bureau. This newscast ended after KTVO and KHQA merged news operations. To meet the needs of the areas increasing Hispanic population, a five-minute Spanish-language "mini-newscast" was begun on KTVO-DT2 in October 2011, but later discontinued.

In March 2009, KTVO received national attention as the victim of a viewer prank. A list of fake names many considered crude or obscene (i.e. Dixie Normus and Craven Moorhead) was submitted to its weekday morning show birthdays/anniversaries segment. This list was aired in February 2009 and by March a video of the incident began appearing on websites such as YouTube and Break.com. Over 400,000 viewings occurred on YouTube before KTVO management forced the removal citing copyright violations. However, it had gained enough national attention that the Howard Stern radio show and Jimmy Kimmel Live! exposed the prank to a larger audience.

During the week of March 19, 2018, KTVO became the second station in the market to begin broadcasting its local newscasts in high definition. The station's Ottumwa bureau was also upgraded to allow for HD broadcasts.

==== Notable former staff ====
- Steve Bell
- Bill Jackson
- Kathryn Marlowe
- Kevin Negandhi

== Technical information ==
=== Subchannels ===
The station's signal is multiplexed:

Subchannels of KTVO
Subchannel	Res.	Short name	Programming
3.1	720p	KTVOABC	ABC
3.2	1080i	KTVOCBS	CBS
3.3	480i	Comet	Comet
3.4	480i	Charge!	Charge!

KTVO-DT2 was eventually upgraded from 720p into 1080i.

=== Analog-to-digital conversion ===
KTVO ended regular programming on its analog signal, over VHF channel 3, on June 12, 2009, the official date on which full-power television stations in the United States transitioned from analog to digital broadcasts under federal mandate. The station's digital signal remained on its pre-transition UHF channel 33, using virtual channel 3.
