= Edina Double Square Historic District =

Historic district in Missouri, United States

- U.S. National Register of Historic Places
- U.S. Historic district
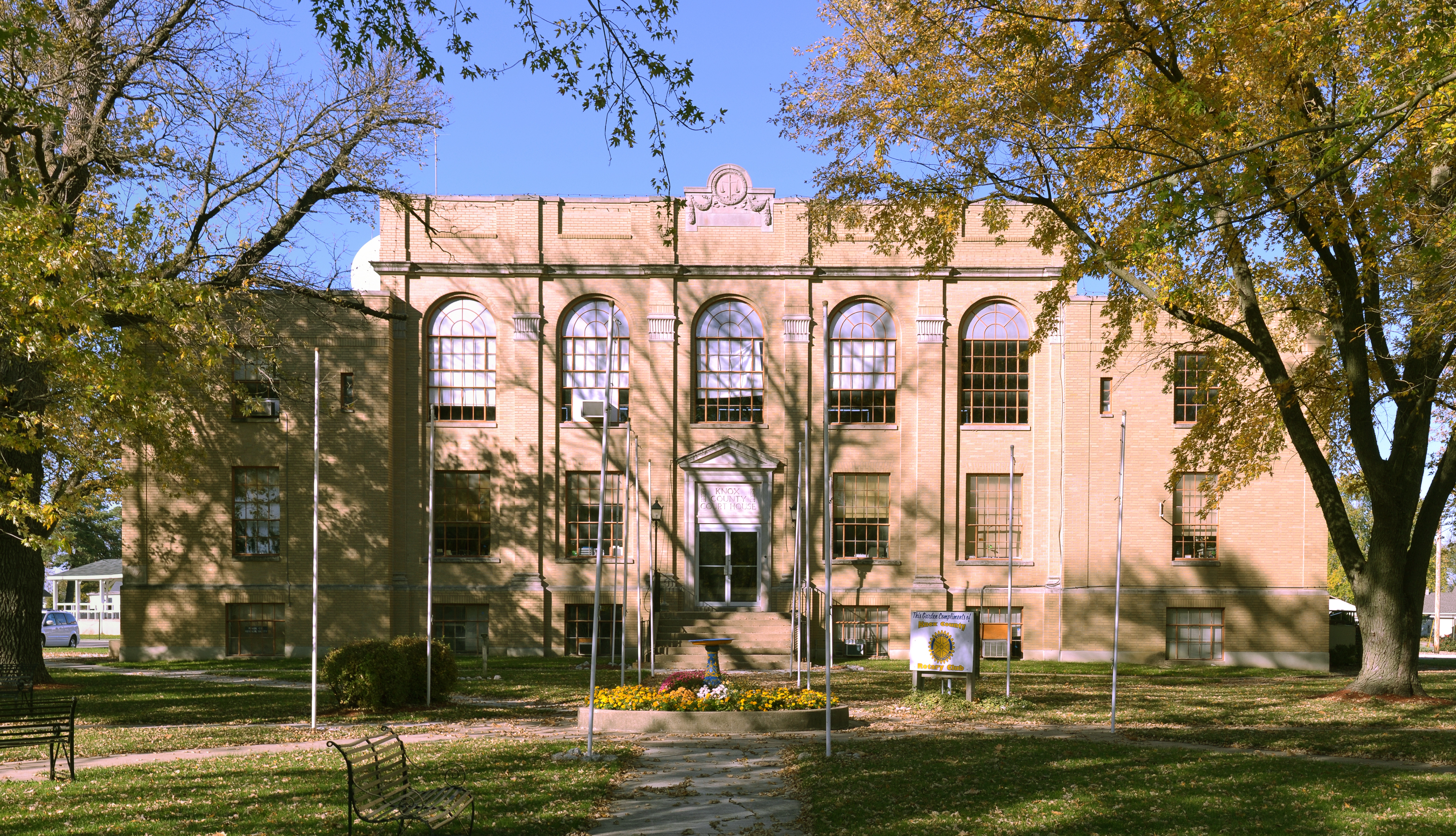
- Knox County Courthouse, October 2014

- Location within Missouri Location within the United States
- Location: Roughly along portions of Main and E. Lafayette Sts.; 118–124 S. Main St., Edina, Missouri
- Coordinates: 40°10′1″N 92°10′22″W
- Area: 10.5 acres (4.2 ha)
- Architect: Ittner, William B.; Weishar and Stablein
- Architectural style: Italianate, Moderne, two part commercial
- NRHP reference No.: 99000902, 02000164 (Boundary Increase)
- Added to NRHP: July 28, 1999, March 13, 2002 (Boundary Increase)

Edina Double Square Historic District is a national historic district located at Edina, Knox County, Missouri. The district encompasses 37 contributing buildings in the central business district of Edina. It developed between about 1865 and 1945 and includes representative examples of Italianate and Streamline Moderne style architecture. Notable contributing buildings include the Public Works Administration funded Knox County Courthouse (1934–1935) designed by William B. Ittner, Bishoff Bakery (1891), Northern Hotel (1860s), Ennis House/Northern Hotel (c. 1865), Edina School and Gymnasium (1915–1916), D. H. Mudd Building (c. 1904), Phillip Linville Building (c. 1908, c. 1963), Tobias J. Lycan Building (c. 1891), Jacob Pugh Building (c. 1891), Albert G. Bostick Building (c. 1891), Knox County Savings Bank (c. 1891), Thomas Burk Buildings (c. 1881), Bank of Edina Building (c. 1907), Joseph F. Biggerstaff Buildings (c. 1881), Stablein Building (c. 1870), and Knox County Public Library (c. 1915).

It was listed on the National Register of Historic Places in 1999, with a boundary increase in 2002.
