= Lost Branch =

River in the United States of America

Coordinates: 39.9711507°N 92.1224008°W

Lost Branch is a stream in Knox County in the U.S. state of Missouri.

According to tradition, a lost child near the creek accounts for the name.

== See also ==
- List of rivers of Missouri
