= Knox City =

Knox City may mean:

- Knox City, Missouri
- Knox City, Texas
- The City of Knox in Victoria, Australia. (Also known as the Knox City Council)
- Westfield Knox, formerly known as Knox City Shopping Centre
- Knox City FC
