= Kate Funk Simpson =

American educator

Kate Funk Simpson (1866-1959) was an American educator.

== Early life ==
Kate M. Funk was born in 1866 in Edina, Missouri, daughter of Thomas W. and Rachel M. Funk of Kirksville, Missouri

Funk was a graduate of the State Normal School at Kirksville, Missouri, graduating in the class of her future husband, James M. Simpson in June 1886.

== Career ==
Kate Funk Simpson was the principal of a High School in Deer Lodge, Montana. For eight years she was the president of Spokane Young Women's Christian Association; for 15 years she was a member of the Spokane City Charities Commission and of the Spokane School Board.

She was also a member of Sorosis and Service Star League.

== Personal life and family ==
On July 1, 1886, Kate Funk married James Mitchell Simpson (1860-1937), and they had one son, James C.

James M. Simpson, actively engaged in the practice of law in Spokane since 1902, had a large business. He was born in Knox County, Missouri, on January 1, 1860, the son of Benjamin and Perlina Simpson, being pioneers of that county. He entered the public schools there when a boy of six years and after completing the course of study therein prescribed, attended the State Normal School at Kirksville, Missouri, from which institution he graduated in the full course of our years in June 1886. Simpson first went west in 1882, locating at Deer Lodge, Montana, remaining west but a short time, when he returned to Missouri to complete his education and again went west to Deer Lodge, Montana, where he engaged in educational work until 1904, having charge of the public schools of that place. He devoted the hours that are usually termed leisure to the study of law and was admitted to the bar of that state in June 1893. Simpson continued his educational work for a time after his admission to the bar, but then devoted entirely to the law. In 1901 he became prosecuting county Attorney of Powell County, Montana, serving in that capacity, for nearly two years. In 1902, he resigned and moved to Spokane, where he continued in the practice of the law. Simpson was identified with three of the leading fraternal organizations. Holding membership in the Masonic fraternity, he attained high rank and was a member of El Katif Temple of the Mystic Shrine. He also belonged to Imperial Lodge, No. 134, I. O. O. F., and to Camp No. 99, W. O. W. He belonged also to the Central Christian church.

The Simpsons moved to Washington in 1902 and lived at 1115 Alice Ave., Spokane, Washington.

Kate Funk Simpson died in 1959 and is buried at Greenwood Memorial Terrace, Spokane.
