= Fox 15 =

Fox 15 may refer to one of the following television stations in the United States, affiliated with the Fox Broadcasting Company:

== Current ==
- KADN-TV in Lafayette, Louisiana
- KVRR in Fargo, North Dakota
- KXVA in Abilene, Texas
- KYOU-TV in Ottumwa, Iowa

== Former ==
- KNXV-TV in Phoenix, Arizona (1986–1994)
- WPMI-TV in Mobile, Alabama–Pensacola, Florida (1986–1996)
