= Fabius Township, Knox County, Missouri =

Township in the American state of Missouri

Coordinates: 40.0058°N 92.0022°W

Fabius Township is an inactive township in the southeastern corner of Knox County, in the U.S. state of Missouri. The inactive township of Jeddo is to the north, and the inactive township of Bourbon is to the west.

Fabius Township was established in 1845 as one of the original townships on the organization of the county. It is named for the South Fabius and the Little Fabius rivers which flow through it.

The village of Newark is within the boundaries of the township.
