= Spees Branch =

Stream in Missouri, United States

Coordinates: 39.966708°N 91.928504°W

Spees Branch is a stream in Knox and Lewis Counties in the U.S. state of Missouri.

Spees Branch has the name of J. C. Spees, the original owner of the site.

== See also ==
- List of rivers of Missouri
