= Jeddo Township, Knox County, Missouri =

Township in Knox County, Missouri, U.S.

Coordinates: 40.0844°N 92.0000°W

Jeddo Township is an inactive township in Knox County, in the U.S. state of Missouri.

Jeddo Township was established in 1859, taking its name from the community of Jeddo, Missouri.
