= Myrtle Township, Knox County, Missouri =

Township in the American state of Missouri

Coordinates: 40.1714°N 92.0000°W

Myrtle Township is an inactive township in Knox County, in the U.S. state of Missouri.

Myrtle Township was established in 1872.
