= Hedge City, Missouri =

Unincorporated community in Missouri, United States

Coordinates: 40°01′48″N 92°08′13″W

Hedge City is an unincorporated community in Knox County, in the U.S. state of Missouri.

== History ==
Hedge City was platted in 1862. A post office called Hedge City was established in 1876, and remained in operation until 1907.
