= Iwo Jima LORAN-C transmitter =

Radio navigation transmitter in Japan

Iwo Jima LORAN-C Mast (1st)
- Interactive map of the Iwo Jima LORAN-C Mast (1st) area

General information
- Status: Destroyed
- Type: Mast radiator insulated against ground
- Location: Iwo Jima, Japan
- Coordinates: 24°48′8″N 141°19′32″E
- Completed: 1963
- Destroyed: 1965

Height
- Height: 411.5 m (1,350 ft)

Design and construction
- Main contractor: US Coast Guard

Iwo Jima LORAN-C Mast (2nd)
- Interactive map of the Iwo Jima LORAN-C Mast (2nd) area

General information
- Status: Destroyed
- Type: Mast radiator insulated against ground
- Location: Iwo Jima, Japan
- Coordinates: 24°48′8″N 141°19′32″E
- Completed: 1965
- Destroyed: 1993

Height
- Height: 411.5 m (1,350.07 ft)

Design and construction
- Main contractor: US Coast Guard

Iwo Jima LORAN-C transmitter was a LORAN-C transmitter at Iwo Jima, Japan of Grid 9970 at 24°48′8″N 141°19′32″E. The Iwo Jima LORAN-C transmitter had a transmission power of 4 megawatts, more than the most powerful broadcasting stations. The Iwo Jima LORAN-C transmitter had a 411.5 meter (1350 ft) tall guyed mast, which was built in 1963.

It collapsed in 1964 during repair of the structural damage caused by an insulator, which crashed into the tower upon failure of a eyebolt. The collapsing tower killed four construction contract workers, three on the tower and one on the ground. The collapse also destroyed the transmitter building.

The tower was later replaced by another tower of the same height. On September 29, 1993 the Iwo Jima LORAN-C transmitter was transferred from the U.S. Coast Guard to the Government of Japan. In 1994, the transmitter was shut down, and its tower was demolished. After closing the Iwo Jima transmitter, the service had been provided by the Niijima LORAN-C transmitter. The Niijima transmitter was shut down on February 1, 2014.

== See also ==
- List of masts
- List of catastrophic collapses of broadcast masts and towers
