= Gloria McCloskey =

American baseball player

- Outfield
- Born: May 20, 1935 (age 90); Edina, Missouri, U.S.
- Bats: Right Throws: Right

Teams
- Rockford Peaches (1953)

Career highlights and awards
- Women in Baseball – AAGPBL Permanent Display at the Baseball Hall of Fame and Museum (unveiled in 1988)

Gloria McCloskey [Rogers] (born May 20, 1935) is a former All-American Girls Professional Baseball League player. She batted and threw right handed.

Born in Edina, Missouri, Gloria McCloskey joined the All American League in its 1953 season. She was assigned as an outfielder for the Rockford Peaches club but did not have much of a chance to play during the season.

Afterwards, Gloria moved to Columbia, Missouri and enrolled at Christian College, known now as Columbia College. While at college, she participated in tennis and field hockey as well as in the synchronised swimming squad and the equestrianism program. As a result, in 1955 she was voted Christian College's Athletic Queen. At that time the college did not have a softball team. Therefore, she played for the Goetz Country Club, a fastpitch softball team based in St. Joseph, Missouri, that won the national championship in that year.

Following her college graduation, she attended Northeast Missouri State University and earned a degree in physical education and theatrology. She then taught physical education and coached basketball and track and field across Missouri. By this time Gloria married Kelly Rogers, a school district superintendent in Macon, Missouri. They had two children, a girl, Tracy, and a son, Trent. In her spare time, Gloria volunteered her assistance with the Macon High School softball team for several years. She also worked as the physical education teacher at Salisbury High School in Salisbury, Missouri, where her husband was Superintendent of Schools in the 1980s before their retirement.

Gloria McCloskey Rogers received further recognition when she became part of Women in Baseball, a permanent display based at the Baseball Hall of Fame and Museum in Cooperstown, New York which was unveiled in 1988 to honor the entire All-American Girls Professional Baseball League. After Penny Marshall premiered her film A League of Their Own in 1992, Gloria often spoke to school classes about her experience in the All American League.
