= Newark, Missouri =

- Village
- Location of Newark, Missouri
- Coordinates: 39°59′36″N 91°58′24″W
- Country: United States
- State: Missouri
- County: Knox

Area
  - Total: 0.32 sq mi (0.84 km^{2})
  - Land: 0.32 sq mi (0.84 km^{2})
  - Water: 0 sq mi (0.00 km^{2})
- Elevation: 692 ft (211 m)

Population (2020)
  - Total: 54
  - Density: 167/sq mi (64.6/km^{2})
- Time zone: UTC-6 (Central (CST))
  - Summer (DST): UTC-5 (CDT)
- ZIP code: 63458
- Area code: 660
- FIPS code: 29-51662
- GNIS feature ID: 0723327

Newark is a village in southeast Knox County, Missouri, United States, along the South Fabius River. As of the 2020 census, its population was 54.

== History ==
Newark was laid out in 1836 within old Fabius Township. The community was named after Newark, New Jersey.

== Geography ==
Newark is located at 39°59′36″N 91°58′24″W (39.993376, -91.973265).

According to the United States Census Bureau, the village has a total area of 0.32 square miles (0.83 km^{2}), all land.

== Demographics ==
Historical population
Census	Pop.	Note	%±
1870	354		—
1880	304		−14.1%
1890	303		−0.3%
1900	265		−12.5%
1910	217		−18.1%
1920	220		1.4%
1930	202		−8.2%
1940	187		−7.4%
1950	156		−16.6%
1960	116		−25.6%
1970	114		−1.7%
1980	105		−7.9%
1990	82		−21.9%
2000	100		22.0%
2010	94		−6.0%
2020	54		−42.6%
U.S. Decennial Census

=== 2010 census ===
As of the census of 2010, there were 94 people, 47 households, and 26 families living in the village. The population density was 293.8 inhabitants per square mile (113.4/km^{2}). There were 60 housing units at an average density of 187.5 per square mile (72.4/km^{2}). The racial makeup of the village was 90.4% White, 2.1% African American, 1.1% Native American, and 6.4% from two or more races. Hispanic or Latino of any race were 1.1% of the population.

There were 47 households, of which 14.9% had children under the age of 18 living with them, 42.6% were married couples living together, 2.1% had a female householder with no husband present, 10.6% had a male householder with no wife present, and 44.7% were non-families. 42.6% of all households were made up of individuals, and 25.5% had someone living alone who was 65 years of age or older. The average household size was 2.00 and the average family size was 2.65.

The median age in the village was 44.5 years. 13.8% of residents were under the age of 18; 12.8% were between the ages of 18 and 24; 23.3% were from 25 to 44; 29.8% were from 45 to 64; and 20.2% were 65 years of age or older. The gender makeup of the village was 53.2% male and 46.8% female.

=== 2000 census ===
As of the census of 2000, there were 100 people, 45 households, and 27 families living in the village. The population density was 308.8 inhabitants per square mile (119.2/km^{2}). There were 65 housing units at an average density of 200.7 per square mile (77.5/km^{2}). The racial makeup of the village was 99.00% White and 1.00% Asian.

There were 45 households, out of which 24.4% had children under the age of 18 living with them, 55.6% were married couples living together, and 40.0% were non-families. 40.0% of all households were made up of individuals, and 15.6% had someone living alone who was 65 years of age or older. The average household size was 2.22 and the average family size was 3.00.

In the village, the population was spread out, with 25.0% under the age of 18, 6.0% from 18 to 24, 27.0% from 25 to 44, 23.0% from 45 to 64, and 19.0% who were 65 years of age or older. The median age was 40 years. For every 100 females, there were 132.6 males. For every 100 females age 18 and over, there were 127.3 males.

The median income for a household in the village was $20,250, and the median income for a family was $24,792. Males had a median income of $21,250 versus $26,250 for females. The per capita income for the village was $10,634. There were 5.9% of families and 13.2% of the population living below the poverty line, including no under eighteens and 31.3% of those over 64.

== Education ==
It is in the Knox County R-I School District.
