= KTVO-TV Tower =

Coordinates: 40.25°N 91.99°W

The KTVO-TV Tower was a 2000 ft (609.6 m) tall television mast (or antenna tower) built near Colony, Missouri that collapsed on June 3, 1988, as workers were replacing structural braces. Three workers were killed in the collapse, which happened in calm weather. The bodies of two contractors were recovered the day of the collapse and identified the next day. The body of the third worker was found about 36 hours after the collapse under a pile of twisted metal about ten feet deep. The tower belonged to KTVO-TV. It was one of the tallest television masts in the world. When the tower collapsed, not only did it knock out KTVO's signal, but it also took Kirksville, Missouri radio station KRXL off the air.
