= Elbert Hall =

American baseball player

- First baseman
- Born: May 19, 1882; Edina, Missouri, U.S.
- Died: January 17, 1935 (aged 52); Des Moines, Iowa, U.S.

Negro league baseball debut
- 1906, for the Cuban X-Giants

Last appearance
- 1906, for the Cuban X-Giants

Teams
- Cuban X-Giants (1906)

Elbert Rufus Hall (May 19, 1882 – January 17, 1935) was an American Negro league first baseman in the 1900s.

A native of Edina, Missouri, Hall attended Northern Illinois University and played for the Cuban X-Giants in 1906. He died in Des Moines, Iowa in 1935 at age 52.
