= Goodland, Knox County, Missouri =

Unincorporated community in Missouri, United States

Coordinates: 39°58′48″N 92°18′06″W

Goodland is an unincorporated community in Knox County, in the U.S. state of Missouri.

== History ==
A post office called Goodland was established in 1854, and remained in operation until 1873. The community bears the surname of a pioneer citizen.
