= Bee Ridge Township, Knox County, Missouri =

Township in the American state of Missouri

Coordinates: 40.0764°N 92.1181°W

Bee Ridge Township is an inactive township in Knox County, in the U.S. state of Missouri.

Bee Ridge Township was established in 1872, taking its name from Bee Ridge.
