= Fabius, Missouri =

Unincorporated community in Missouri, United States

Coordinates: 40°17′19″N 92°08′17″W

Fabius is an unincorporated community in Knox County, in the U.S. state of Missouri.

== History ==
Fabius was laid out in 1887 when the Santa Fe railroad was extended to that point. A post office called Fabius was established in 1897, and remained in operation until 1935. The community was originally referred to as 'Cunningham's Switch' after Ike Cunningham, the local cattle shipment manager. After he moved away it became known as Fabius. The community takes its name from the nearby Fabius River.
