= Shelton Township, Knox County, Missouri =

Township in Knox County, Missouri, U.S.

Coordinates: 40.0794°N 92.2611°W

Shelton Township is an inactive township in Knox County, in the U.S. state of Missouri.

Shelton Township was established in 1845, taking its name from Medley Shelton, a pioneer judge.
