= Colony Township, Knox County, Missouri =

Inactive township in Missouri, U.S.

Coordinates: 40.2553°N 92.0111°W

Colony Township is an inactive township in Knox County, in the U.S. state of Missouri. Colony Township was established in 1872, taking its name from Colony, Missouri.
