= Locust Hill, Missouri =

Unincorporated community in Missouri, United States

Coordinates: 40°01′33″N 92°16′33″W

Locust Hill is an unincorporated community in Knox County, in the U.S. state of Missouri.

== History ==
Locust Hill was platted in 1870, and named for the locust trees near the elevated town site. A post office called Locust Hill was established in 1858, and remained in operation until 1907.
