= Kenwood, Missouri =

Unincorporated community in Missouri, United States

Coordinates: 40.195593°N 92.287131°W

Kenwood is an unincorporated community in Knox County, in the U.S. state of Missouri.

== History ==
Kenwood was founded in 1889, and named after a railroad official. A post office called Kenwood was established in 1890, and remained in operation until 1936.
