= Edina, Missouri =

- City
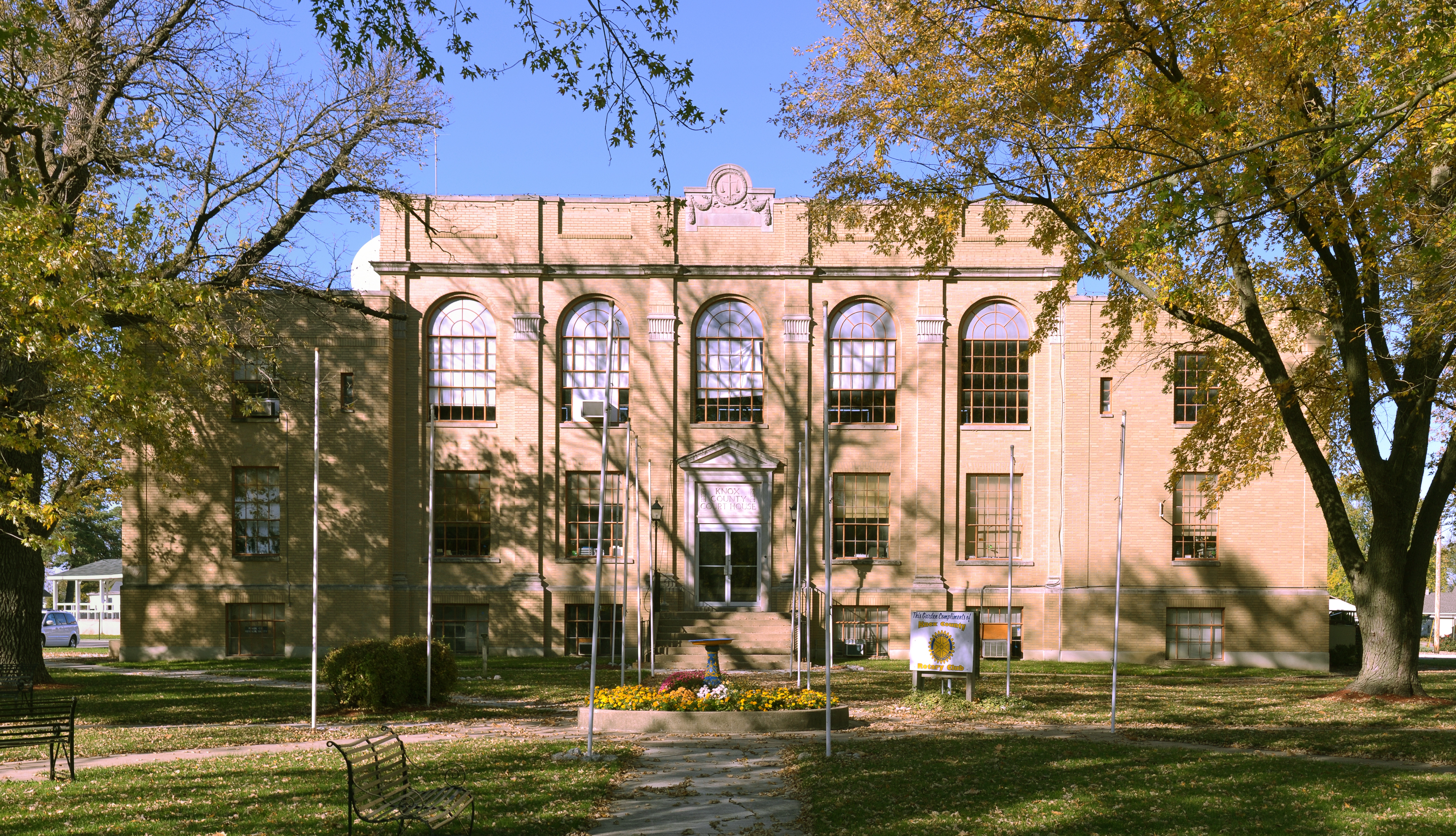
- Knox County Courthouse

- Location of Edina, Missouri
- Coordinates: 40°10′8″N 92°10′24″W
- Country: United States
- State: Missouri
- County: Knox

Area
  - Total: 1.31 sq mi (3.40 km^{2})
  - Land: 1.31 sq mi (3.38 km^{2})
  - Water: 0.0077 sq mi (0.02 km^{2})
- Elevation: 814 ft (248 m)

Population (2020)
  - Total: 1,012
  - Density: 775/sq mi (299.2/km^{2})
- Time zone: UTC-6 (Central (CST))
  - Summer (DST): UTC-5 (CDT)
- ZIP code: 63537
- Area code: 660
- FIPS code: 29-21322
- GNIS feature ID: 0717404

Edina (/iːˈdaɪnə/ ee-DY-nə) is a city and county seat of Knox County, Missouri, United States, between the North and South Forks of the South Fabius River. As of the 2020 census, its population was 1,012.

== Geography ==
Edina is located in central Knox County at the intersection of Missouri routes 6 and 15. Hurdland is 6.5 miles to the west, Knox City is 8.5 miles to the east and the community of Baring is about 5.5 miles to the north. The North and South Forks of the South Fabius River pass approximately one-half mile to the northeast and southwest of the city.

According to the United States Census Bureau, the city has a total area of 1.32 square miles (3.42 km^{2}), of which 1.31 square miles (3.39 km^{2}) is land and 0.01 square miles (0.03 km^{2}) is water.

Panoramic sketch of the Edina, Missouri courthouse square and some surrounding businesses, circa 1876. View is looking north.

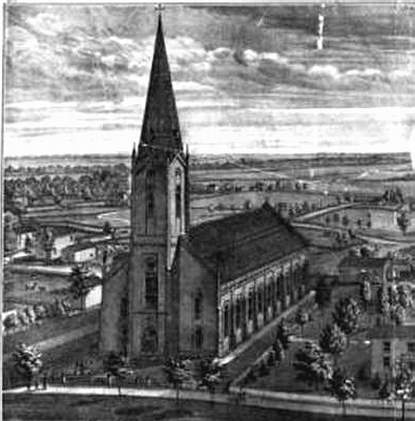
A sketch of St. Joseph's Catholic Church, Edina, Missouri. Circa 1876. The church is still in existence today.

=== Weather ===
According to weather data tallied between July 1, 1985 and June 30, 2015 for every location in the National Oceanic and Atmospheric Administration's official climate database, Edina, Missouri, is the snowiest place in the state of Missouri with an average of 22 inches (560 mm) of snow per year.

== History ==
Edina was platted in 1839. The community was named after the Scottish city of Edinburgh, as referred to by Scots poets. A post office called Edina has been in operation since 1850.

The Edina Double Square Historic District is listed on the National Register of Historic Places.

== Demographics ==
Historical population
Census	Pop.	Note	%±
1850	163		—
1870	807		—
1880	1,156		43.2%
1890	1,456		26.0%
1900	1,605		10.2%
1910	1,526		−4.9%
1920	1,438		−5.8%
1930	1,532		6.5%
1940	1,637		6.9%
1950	1,607		−1.8%
1960	1,457		−9.3%
1970	1,574		8.0%
1980	1,520		−3.4%
1990	1,283		−15.6%
2000	1,233		−3.9%
2010	1,176		−4.6%
2020	1,012		−13.9%
U.S. Decennial Census

=== 2010 census ===
As of the census of 2010, there were 1,176 people, 535 households, and 312 families living in the city. The population density was 897.7 inhabitants per square mile (346.6/km^{2}). There were 667 housing units at an average density of 509.2 per square mile (196.6/km^{2}). The racial makeup of the city was 98.6% White, 0.4% African American, 0.4% Native American, 0.1% Asian, and 0.4% from two or more races. Hispanic or Latino of any race were 0.6% of the population.

There were 535 households, of which 25.0% had children under the age of 18 living with them, 43.9% were married couples living together, 12.1% had a female householder with no husband present, 2.2% had a male householder with no wife present, and 41.7% were non-families. 38.3% of all households were made up of individuals, and 20.4% had someone living alone who was 65 years of age or older. The average household size was 2.14 and the average family size was 2.84.

The median age in the city was 46 years. 22.7% of residents were under the age of 18; 5.6% were between the ages of 18 and 24; 19.8% were from 25 to 44; 28% were from 45 to 64; and 24.1% were 65 years of age or older. The gender makeup of the city was 46.0% male and 54.0% female.

=== 2000 census ===
As of the census of 2000, there were 1,233 people, 571 households, and 339 families living in the city. The population density was 940.7 inhabitants per square mile (363.2/km^{2}). There were 678 housing units at an average density of 517.3 per square mile (199.7/km^{2}). The racial makeup of the city was 97.16% White, 0.08% African American, 0.08% Native American, 0.16% Asian, 0.16% from other races, and 2.35% from two or more races. Hispanic or Latino of any race were 0.65% of the population.

There were 571 households, out of which 22.9% had children under the age of 18 living with them, 47.1% were married couples living together, 9.6% had a female householder with no husband present, and 40.6% were non-families. 38.9% of all households were made up of individuals, and 21.5% had someone living alone who was 65 years of age or older. The average household size was 2.11 and the average family size was 2.78.

In the city the population was spread out, with 22.4% under the age of 18, 5.6% from 18 to 24, 21.5% from 25 to 44, 23.6% from 45 to 64, and 26.9% who were 65 years of age or older. The median age was 45 years. For every 100 females, there were 86.0 males. For every 100 females age 18 and over, there were 82.6 males.

The median income for a household in the city was $24,900, and the median income for a family was $30,938. Males had a median income of $21,492 versus $16,458 for females. The per capita income for the city was $12,863. About 15.1% of families and 19.1% of the population were below the poverty line, including 29.7% of those under age 18 and 19.3% of those age 65 or over.

== Education ==
Public education in Edina is administered by Knox County R-I School District.

The town has a lending library, the Knox County Branch Library.

== Notable people ==
- Terry Joyce, College football All-American and professional football player
- Gloria McCloskey, All-American Girls Professional Baseball League player
- George Turner, United States Senator
- Elbert Hall, Negro Leagues Baseball Player
- J. Mark Scearce, American Composer
- Joseph Shannon, American Architect
- Kate Funk Simpson, American Educator
