= Millport, Missouri =

Unincorporated community in Missouri, United States

Coordinates: 40.267261°N 92.093235°W

Millport is an unincorporated community in Knox County, in the U.S. state of Missouri.

== History ==
A post office called Millport was established in 1858, and remained in operation until 1901. The community was named for a watermill near the original town site.
