= Lyon Township, Knox County, Missouri =

Township in the American state of Missouri

Coordinates: 40.1731°N 92.2611°W

Lyon Township is an inactive township in Knox County, in the U.S. state of Missouri.

Lyon Township was established in 1860, taking its name from Hezekiah Lyon, a local judge. As of 2020, it had a population of 464. The median age according to the 2022 American Community Survey 5-Year Estimates was 47.8 ± 9.1 years old, with 31.7% older than 65 and 15.3% being veterans. The same survey found that 99.5% of households spoke English at home, and the remaining 0.5% spoke Spanish.
