= Sender Bielstein =

Broadcasting tower in Germany

Coordinates: 51.90588°N 8.82183°E

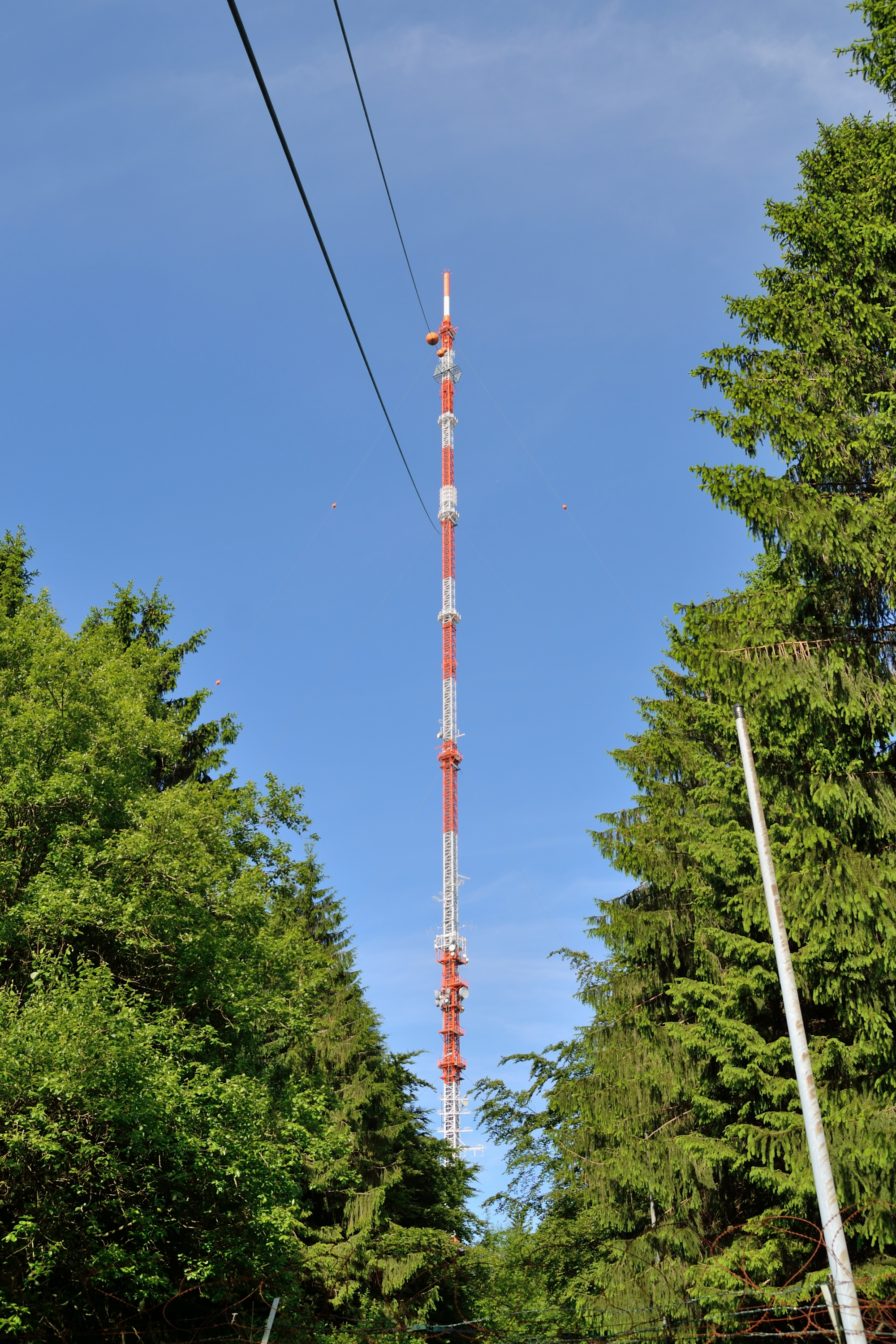
The Teutoburg Forest transmitter located on the Birlstein mountain

The Sender Bielstein (Transmitter Bielstein) is an FM- and TV-broadcasting facility on the 393-metre-high Bielstein mountain in the Forest of Teutoburg, North Rhine-Westphalia, Germany.

Bielstein transmitter, which is the property of Westdeutscher Rundfunk and used for transmitting its programmes was established in 1951. It used until 1954 a 60-metre-tall mast. This mast was replaced in 1954 by a 102-metre-tall antenna tower. However this mast was not able to supply the whole area with FM and TV-programmes and so a taller antenna mast was soon planned. Finally in 1968 construction work started for a 298-metre-tall guyed steel tube mast. This mast, which was completed in 1970 enabled a satisfactory supply of FM- and TV-programmes in the area.

On January 15, 1985, at 6.26 MST as result of too much ice load and great wind-induced stress, one of the upper guys of the mast was torn off. As result the mast bent and cracked 160 metres above ground. Afterwards the rest of the mast collapsed as the falling upper parts destroyed the guys holding its lower parts. Already on the afternoon of that day as replacement for the first FM-transmitter which used the mast went on air again, by using a communication tower of Deutsche Telekom as the transmission site. Three days later, TV broadcasting was also restored. On Bielstein mountain, a temporary 85-metre-tall auxiliary transmission mast for transmitting the TV and FM-programmes was erected. Of course, reception of the signals radiated from this auxiliary mast was much worse than from the former 298 metre mast and so construction work for a new 302-metre-tall guyed lattice steel mast started, which was completed in August 1986.

In April 2006 the mast got a new antenna for DVB-T broadcasting, which reduced its height to 290 metres.

== Transmitted FM-frequencies ==
| Name of programmes | Regional programme | Frequency | ERP |
|---|---|---|---|
| Eins Live | no | 105,5 MHz | 100 kW |
| WDR 2 | Bielefeld | 93,2 MHz | 100 kW |
| WDR 3 | no | 97,0 MHz | 100 kW |
| WDR 4 | no | 100,5 MHz | 100 kW |
| WDR 5 | no | 90,6 MHz | 100 kW |

== See also ==
- List of masts
