= Jeddo, Pennsylvania =

Borough in Pennsylvania, US

- Borough
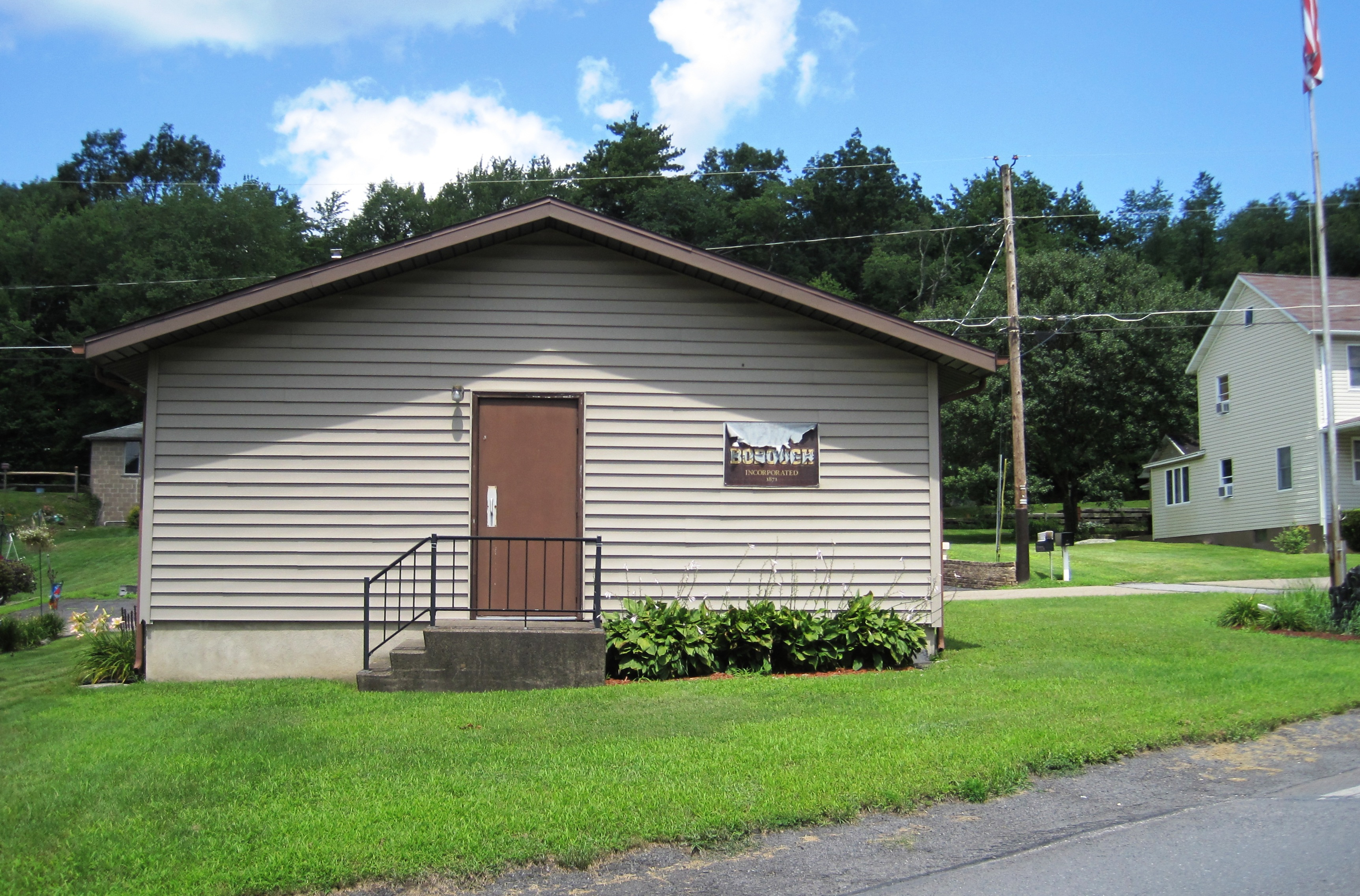
- Jeddo borough hall

- Location of Jeddo in Luzerne County, Pennsylvania.

- Location within Pennsylvania Location within the United States
- Coordinates: 40°59′40″N 75°53′57″W
- Country: United States
- State: Pennsylvania
- County: Luzerne
- Incorporated: October 23, 1871
- Named for: Tokyo, Japan

Government
  - Type: Borough Council

Area
  - Total: 0.25 sq mi (0.66 km^{2})
  - Land: 0.25 sq mi (0.66 km^{2})
  - Water: 0 sq mi (0.00 km^{2})

Population (2020)
  - Total: 108
  - Density: 426.0/sq mi (164.47/km^{2})
- Time zone: UTC-5 (Eastern (EST))
  - Summer (DST): UTC-4 (EDT)
- Zip code: 18224
- Area code: 570
- FIPS code: 42-37792

Jeddo is a borough in Luzerne County, Pennsylvania, United States. As of the 2020 census, the population was 109, making it the least populous borough in the county.

== Origin of the name ==
The Pennsylvania village was originally known as "Japan-Jeddo," after the Japanese port of Edo (Tokyo) (anglicized to Jeddo, Japan). When it was incorporated as a Pennsylvania borough (on October 23, 1871), it was renamed "Jeddo." However, some people still referred to it as "Japan-Jeddo." This unofficial name was used up until the 1941 surprise attack on Pearl Harbor, which triggered the United States to enter World War II. After the Japanese attack, the locals dropped the unofficial name ("Japan-Jeddo") and only referred to it as "Jeddo."

== Geography ==
Jeddo is located at 40°59′40″N 75°53′57″W (40.994525, -75.899052).

According to the United States Census Bureau, the borough has a total area of 0.27 square miles (0.7 km^{2}), all land. Jeddo uses the Freeland zip code of 18224.

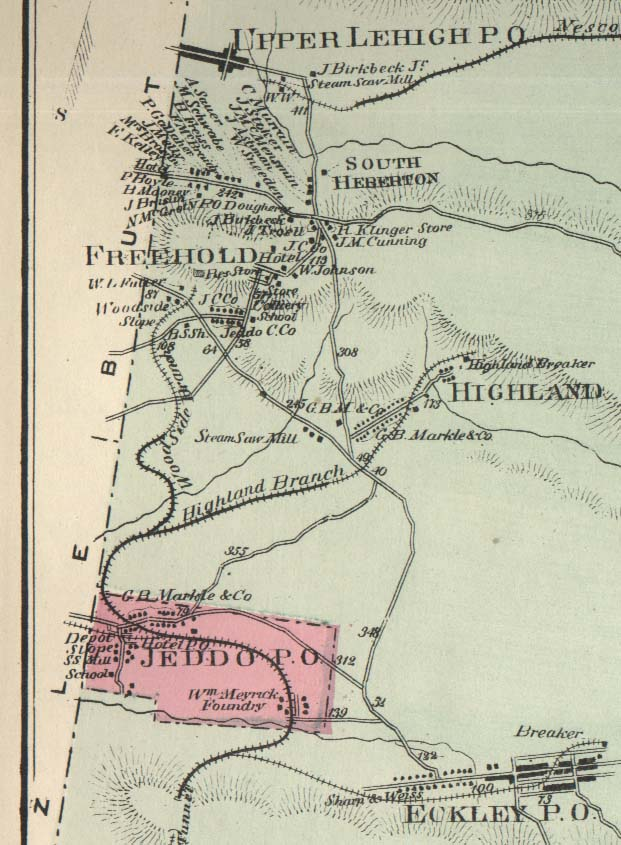
A map of Jeddo and the surrounding communities (1873)

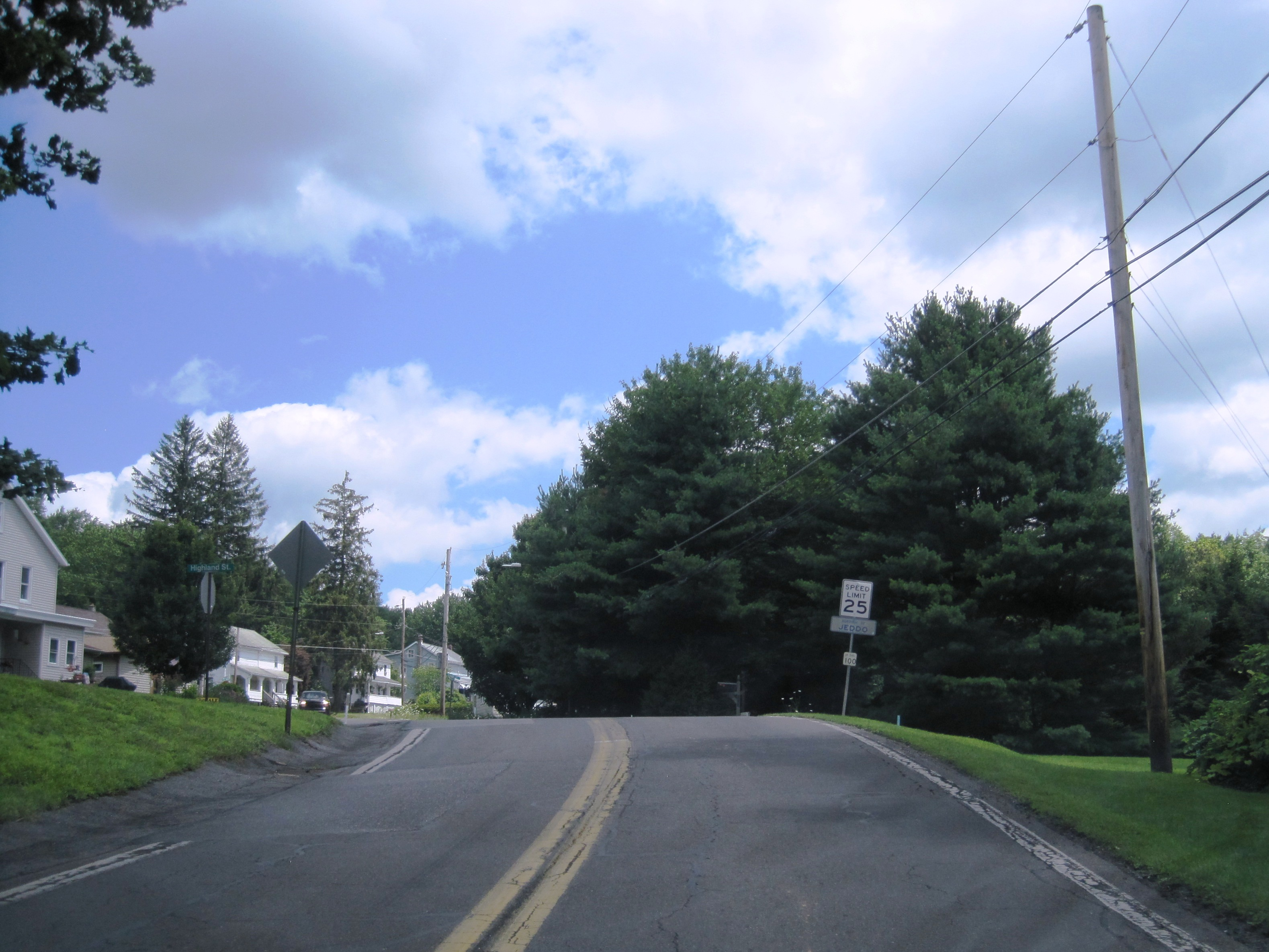
Entering Jeddo from the west (Hazle Township)

== Demographics ==
Historical population
Census	Pop.	Note	%±
1880	350		—
1890	358		2.3%
1900	1,632		355.9%
1910	377		−76.9%
1920	364		−3.4%
1930	404		11.0%
1940	327		−19.1%
1950	262		−19.9%
1960	183		−30.2%
1970	177		−3.3%
1980	128		−27.7%
1990	124		−3.1%
2000	144		16.1%
2010	98		−31.9%
2020	108		10.2%
2021 (est.)	109	▲	0.9%

As of the census of 2010, there were 98 people living in the borough. According to the 2000 Census, the population density was 474.9 inhabitants per square mile (183.4/km^{2}). There were 66 housing units at an average density of 217.7 per square mile (84.1/km^{2}). The racial makeup of the borough was 98.61% White, and 1.39% from two or more races.

There were 43 households, out of which 36.1% had children under the age of 18 living with them, 62.8% were married couples living together, 18.6% had a female householder with no husband present, and 37.2% were non-families. 36.1% of all households were made up of individuals, and 13.1% had someone living alone who was 65 years of age or older. The average household size was 2.36 and the average family size was 3.15.

In the borough the population was spread out, with 27.1% under the age of 18, 10.4% from 18 to 24, 34.0% from 25 to 44, 19.4% from 455 to 64, and 9.0% who were 65 years of age or older. The median age was 30 years. For every 100 females, there were 118.2 males. For every 100 females age 18 and over, there were 114.3 males.

The median income for a household in the borough was $20,436, and the median income for a family was $53,750. Males had a median income of $21,628 versus $13,750 for females. The per capita income for the borough was $14,776. There were none of the families and 7.6% of the population living below the poverty line, including no under eighteens and 100.0% of those over 64.

== Education ==
The school district is the Hazleton Area School District.

== See also ==
- Jeddo, Japan
