= FM Federal =

Radio station in Buenos Aires, Argentina

Buenos Aires; Argentina
- Broadcast area: Buenos Aires
- Frequency: 99.5 MHz FM

Programming
- Format: Non commercial; Adult Contemporary

Ownership
- Owner: Policía Federal Argentina

History
- First air date: December 1996
- Former frequencies: 93.1 MHz, 93.7 MHz

Links
- Website: fmfederal.com

FM Federal (call sign LRL 317) is an Argentine commercial-free radio station owned and operated by the Policía Federal Argentina (Argentina's Federal Police). It broadcasts from Buenos Aires on 99.5 MHz and carries an adult contemporary format.

The station's mission, according to its homepage, is to build awareness around many issues including environmental crimes, human trafficking, cybercrime, and addiction.

== Programming ==
The station airs public service announcements, traffic reports, weather reports, security and health advisories and news updates every 30 minutes. The music is mostly soft-pop. Originally the station broadcast on the 93.7 MHz channel. Since 2009, as a result of a reorganization of FM frequencies, the station broadcasts on 99.5 MHz.
