= Knox City, Missouri =

- City
- Location of Knox City, Missouri
- Coordinates: 40°8′41″N 92°0′38″W
- Country: United States
- State: Missouri
- County: Knox

Area
  - Total: 0.21 sq mi (0.55 km^{2})
  - Land: 0.21 sq mi (0.55 km^{2})
  - Water: 0 sq mi (0.00 km^{2})
- Elevation: 764 ft (233 m)

Population (2020)
  - Total: 191
  - Density: 906.2/sq mi (349.87/km^{2})
- Time zone: UTC-6 (Central (CST))
  - Summer (DST): UTC-5 (CDT)
- ZIP code: 63446
- Area code: 660
- FIPS code: 29-39278
- GNIS feature ID: 0735679

Knox City is a city in eastern Knox County, Missouri, United States. As of the 2020 census, its population was 191.

== History ==
Knox City was platted in 1872 when the railroad was extended to that point. A post office called Knox City has been in operation since 1873.

== Geography ==
Knox City is located at in eastern Knox County at the intersection of Missouri Route 6 with routes E and V. Edina is approximately 8.5 miles to the west and La Belle is five miles to the east-southeast in adjacent Lewis County.

According to the United States Census Bureau, the city has a total area of 0.21 square miles (0.54 km^{2}), all land.

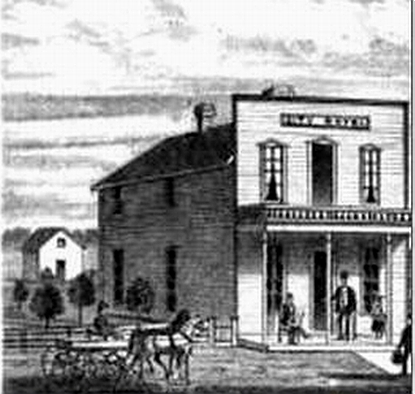
The Knox City Hotel, J.R. Hamline, owner. As it appeared circa 1876. Hotel was located directly across from the Knox City, Mo. train depot.

== Demographics ==
Historical population
Census	Pop.	Note	%±
1870	354		—
1880	234		−33.9%
1890	288		23.1%
1900	365		26.7%
1910	395		8.2%
1920	400		1.3%
1930	401		0.3%
1940	419		4.5%
1950	362		−13.6%
1960	330		−8.8%
1970	284		−13.9%
1980	281		−1.1%
1990	262		−6.8%
2000	223		−14.9%
2010	216		−3.1%
2020	191		−11.6%
U.S. Decennial Census

=== 2010 census ===
As of the census of 2010, there were 216 people, 109 households, and 61 families residing in the city. The population density was 1,028.6 inhabitants per square mile (397.1/km^{2}). There were 126 housing units at an average density of 600.0 per square mile (231.7/km^{2}). The racial makeup of the city was 98.1% White and 1.9% from two or more races.

There were 109 households, of which 22.9% had children under the age of 18 living with them, 44.0% were married couples living together, 7.3% had a female householder with no husband present, 4.6% had a male householder with no wife present, and 44.0% were non-families. 39.4% of all households were made up of individuals, and 19.3% had someone living alone who was 65 years of age or older. The average household size was 1.98 and the average family size was 2.59.

The median age in the city was 49.7 years. 18.5% of residents were under the age of 18; 5.5% were between the ages of 18 and 24; 17.6% were from 25 to 44; 36.5% were from 45 to 64; and 21.8% were 65 years of age or older. The gender makeup of the city was 46.3% male and 53.7% female.

=== 2000 census ===
As of the census of 2000, there were 223 people, 115 households, and 64 families residing in the city. The population density was 1,062.5 inhabitants per square mile (410.2/km^{2}). There were 137 housing units at an average density of 652.8 per square mile (252.0/km^{2}). The racial makeup of the city was 99.10% White, and 0.90% from two or more races. Hispanic or Latino of any race were 1.79% of the population.

There were 115 households, out of which 20.0% had children under the age of 18 living with them, 45.2% were married couples living together, 6.1% had a female householder with no husband present, and 44.3% were non-families. 40.9% of all households were made up of individuals, and 24.3% had someone living alone who was 65 years of age or older. The average household size was 1.94 and the average family size was 2.55.

In the city the population was spread out, with 16.1% under the age of 18, 8.1% from 18 to 24, 19.3% from 25 to 44, 28.7% from 45 to 64, and 27.8% who were 65 years of age or older. The median age was 48 years. For every 100 females, there were 87.4 males. For every 100 females age 18 and over, there were 87.0 males.

The median income for a household in the city was $18,417, and the median income for a family was $24,750. Males had a median income of $25,625 versus $16,458 for females. The per capita income for the city was $10,696. About 8.5% of families and 16.0% of the population were below the poverty line, including 5.0% of those under the age of eighteen and 36.7% of those 65 or over.

== Education ==
It is in the Knox County R-I School District.
