= KYOU-TV =

Television station in Ottumwa, Iowa

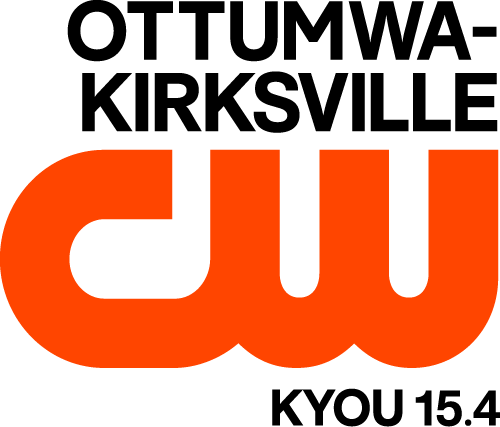
- Ottumwa, Iowa; Kirksville, Missouri; United States
- City: Ottumwa, Iowa
- Channels: Digital: 15 (UHF); Virtual: 15
- Branding: KYOU; Iowa Tonight (newscasts); Ottumwa–Kirksville CW (15.4)

Programming
- Affiliations: 15.1: Fox; 15.2: NBC; 15.3: 365BLK/MyNetworkTV; 15.4: CW+; for others, see § Subchannels

Ownership
- Owner: Gray Media; (Gray Television Licensee, LLC)
- Sister stations: KCRG-TV (news agreement)

History
- First air date: June 2, 1986
- Former call signs: KOIA-TV (1986–1992)
- Former channel numbers: Analog: 15 (UHF, 1986–2009); Digital: 14 (UHF, until 2009)
- Former affiliations: Independent (1986, 1987–1988); UPN (secondary, 1997–c. 2006)
- Call sign meaning: The word "you"

Technical information
- Licensing authority: FCC
- Facility ID: 53820
- ERP: 360 kW
- HAAT: 360 m (1,181 ft)
- Transmitter coordinates: 41°11′42″N 91°57′16″W
- Translator(s): K30MG-D Kirksville

Links
- Public license information: Public file; LMS
- Website: www.kyoutv.com

KYOU-TV (channel 15) is a television station licensed to Ottumwa, Iowa, United States, serving Ottumwa and Kirksville, Missouri, as an affiliate of Fox, NBC, MyNetworkTV, and The CW Plus. The station is owned by Gray Media and maintains studios on West 2nd Street in Downtown Ottumwa; its transmitter is located one mile (1.6 km) east of Richland, Iowa. A translator, K30MG-D, offers additional coverage in the Kirksville area.

Channel 15 went on the air in June 1986 as KOIA-TV. Its first stint on the air was short-lived, as its founding majority owner, Impact Television, was undercapitalized and ran out of money, forcing it to shut all of its stations down that August. After a sale, the station returned to the air in June 1987 and became a Fox affiliate in 1988, changing its call sign to KYOU-TV in 1992. It was operated by Raycom Media under a local marketing agreement from 2003 to 2018; during part of this time, Raycom owned the other major station in this market, KTVO in Kirksville, but it continued to provide services to KYOU-TV after selling off KTVO in 2006. An in-house local newscast was added in 2015 utilizing the facilities of William Penn University in Oskaloosa, and the station added its NBC subchannel in 2018. Gray acquired Raycom in 2018 and purchased KYOU-TV outright from owner American Spirit Media. The station airs local newscasts produced by Gray-owned KCRG-TV in Cedar Rapids.

== History ==
=== Early history ===
A construction permit was granted to the Haynes Communications Company, owned by Carl Haynes, for a new commercial television station in Ottumwa in November 1984. Haynes managed radio stations in Mississippi but admitted to the Ottumwa Courier that his interest in other permits would put building the Ottumwa station, designated KOIA-TV, "on the back burner". Before going on air, Haynes sold the permit for his expenses to Ottumwa Television Limited Partnership. This firm was 51 percent owned by Impact Television of Vienna, Virginia, which owned low-power K42AM in Ottumwa. K42AM was especially interested in channel 15 because, in converting to a full-power station on the KOIA-TV construction permit, it would have obtained must-carry status on the local cable system, which was not carrying channel 42. The low-power station was off the air by January 1986, with KOIA-TV planned as its successor.

The only ads they carried were for the Ottumwa Public Transportation System, which could explain something.

— Television DXer Jeff Kadet on the first attempt to start KOIA-TV

KOIA-TV began broadcasting on June 2, 1986. Even though this market only had one television station—KTVO in Kirksville—KOIA-TV was an independent station. (Note: A translator system provided rebroadcasts of the CBS and NBC affiliates in Des Moines—KCCI and WHO-TV.) However, the original ownership—a partnership consisting of various minority local investors and Impact Television—was badly undercapitalized. Impact owned KOIA and low-power stations in Jackson, Tennessee; Jonesboro, Arkansas; and Oglesby, Illinois. When Impact cut financial support and stated that it had run out of money, local management immediately moved to cease broadcasting, with KOIA-TV going off the air on August 19; that day, the general manager had turned the transmitter on at 11 a.m. only to be called at 11:05 a.m. and told to take it off the air pending a sale.

Ottumwa Television Limited Partnership sold the station in the wake of the shutdown to Public Interest Broadcast Group Inc., an Orlando, Florida-based firm owned by Dean C. Engstrom and Les White, for $900. Public Interest put KOIA-TV back on the air on June 29, 1987, though it had been testing for two weeks prior to the relaunch. In addition to syndicated programs, movies, sports, and Independent Network News, the station initially offered a local news program covering the Ottumwa area, News Plus, and an interview program, Midday Magazine; studios were set up at the present site, a former McDonald's restaurant. White sold his interest to Engstrom later in the year. In February 1988, KOIA-TV began airing programming from the Fox network.

On April 30, 1992, the station's call letters were changed to KYOU-TV. In 1997, KYOU served as a secondary affiliate of UPN. In January 1999, Public Interest Broadcast Group announced it would sell KYOU to Omaha-based Waitt Broadcasting for $3 million.

For most of KOIA-TV/KYOU-TV's history since returning to the air in 1987, the station had been the local broadcaster of Iowa Hawkeyes sports events, even well into its Fox affiliation. Despite a new Fox affiliation agreement, KYOU-TV continued to preempt some Fox programming to show games. However, in January 2001, Fox ordered the station to stop carrying sports telecasts that conflicted with network prime time and sports programming, threatening disaffiliation if it did not comply. This led to angry callers frustrated that some Iowa football and basketball games were not shown, while the station also had to pay a fine to the ESPN Plus syndication service because it could not show games it had agreed to air. KYOU then reached an agreement with Fox that allowed it 15 prime time preemptions.

=== LMA with Raycom Media ===
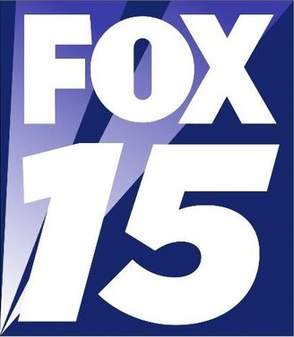
Logo for Fox subchannel, used until 2019.

In August 2003, Raycom Media acquired three of Waitt Broadcasting's Fox affiliates in southeastern states for $25.7 million. On September 6, Waitt announced it would spin off the station to Charlotte, North Carolina-based Ottumwa Media Holdings (co-founded by Thomas B. Henson and Macon Moye, and renamed American Spirit Media in August 2006), for $4 million. Ottumwa Media Holdings then entered into a local marketing agreement (LMA) with Raycom, owner of KTVO, to provide KYOU-TV with commercial scheduling, promotions, master control, and production services (including a planned local newscast), though programming and sales remained separate. Although Raycom sold KTVO and other stations to Barrington Broadcasting in 2006, Raycom continued to act as the service provider to KYOU.

KYOU-TV discontinued regular programming on its analog signal, over UHF channel 15, on June 12, 2009, when full-power television stations in the United States transitioned from analog to digital broadcasts under federal mandate. The station's digital signal relocated from its pre-transition UHF channel 14 to channel 15.

In 2018, KYOU-TV added two major networks as subchannels. On January 24, its 15.2 subchannel began carrying NBC via a long-term agreement between the network and American Spirit Media. This followed a failed effort by New Moon Communications to convert KUMK-LP—a former TBN translator—to an NBC affiliate in 2011; KUMK-LP's license was canceled in March 2014. On September 1, the 15.4 subchannel launched The CW Plus, giving the network its first over-the-air outlet in the market.

=== Sale to Gray Television ===
On June 25, 2018, Atlanta-based Gray Television announced an agreement with Raycom to merge their respective broadcasting assets in a $3.6 billion cash-and-stock transaction. As part of the merger, Gray also acquired KYOU and WUPV in Richmond, Virginia, which Raycom exercised its options to purchase outright from American Spirit Media. The sale to Gray was approved by the Federal Communications Commission on December 20 and completed on January 2, 2019.

== Newscasts ==
In 2015, KYOU-TV launched an in-house 9 p.m. newscast. The newscast was produced in partnership with William Penn University in Oskaloosa; university students were involved in the production of the program, while the news set was in the technology center on campus. After affiliating with NBC and at the insistence of the network, KYOU's NBC subchannel debuted a 10 p.m. evening newscast on July 16, 2018.

In 2023, the in-house newscast was replaced with the launch of Iowa Tonight, a 9 p.m. newscast on the CW subchannel of Gray-owned KCRG-TV in Cedar Rapids and originating there. This program airs at 9 p.m. on KYOU–Fox and at 10 p.m. on KYOU–NBC.

== Subchannels ==
KYOU-TV's transmitter is located one mile (1.6 km) east of Richland, Iowa. The station's signal is multiplexed:

Subchannels of KYOU-TV
| Subchannel | Res. | Short name | Programming |
|---|---|---|---|
| 15.1 | 720p | KYOU-DT | Fox |
| 15.2 | 720p | NBC | NBC |
| 15.3 | 480i | The365 | 365BLK (primary); MyNetworkTV (secondary) |
| 15.4 | 480i | CW | The CW Plus |
| 15.5 | 480i | Grit | Grit |
| 15.6 | 480i | T-Crime | True Crime Network |
