= Bee Ridge (Missouri) =

Ridge in Missouri, U.S.

Coordinates: 40°04′31″N 92°03′35″W

Bee Ridge is a ridge in Knox County in the U.S. state of Missouri.

Bee Ridge was named for the honeybees in the area.
