= Greensburg, Missouri =

Unincorporated community in Missouri, United States

Coordinates: 40°17′47″N 92°13′01″W

Greensburg is an unincorporated community in Knox County, in the U.S. state of Missouri.

== History ==
Greensburg was platted in 1852, and named after James S. Green, a state legislator. A post office called Greensburg was established in 1857, and remained in operation until 1954.
