= Langenberg transmission tower =

Radio tower in Langenberg, Germany

Coordinates: 51°21′19″N 7°08′08″E

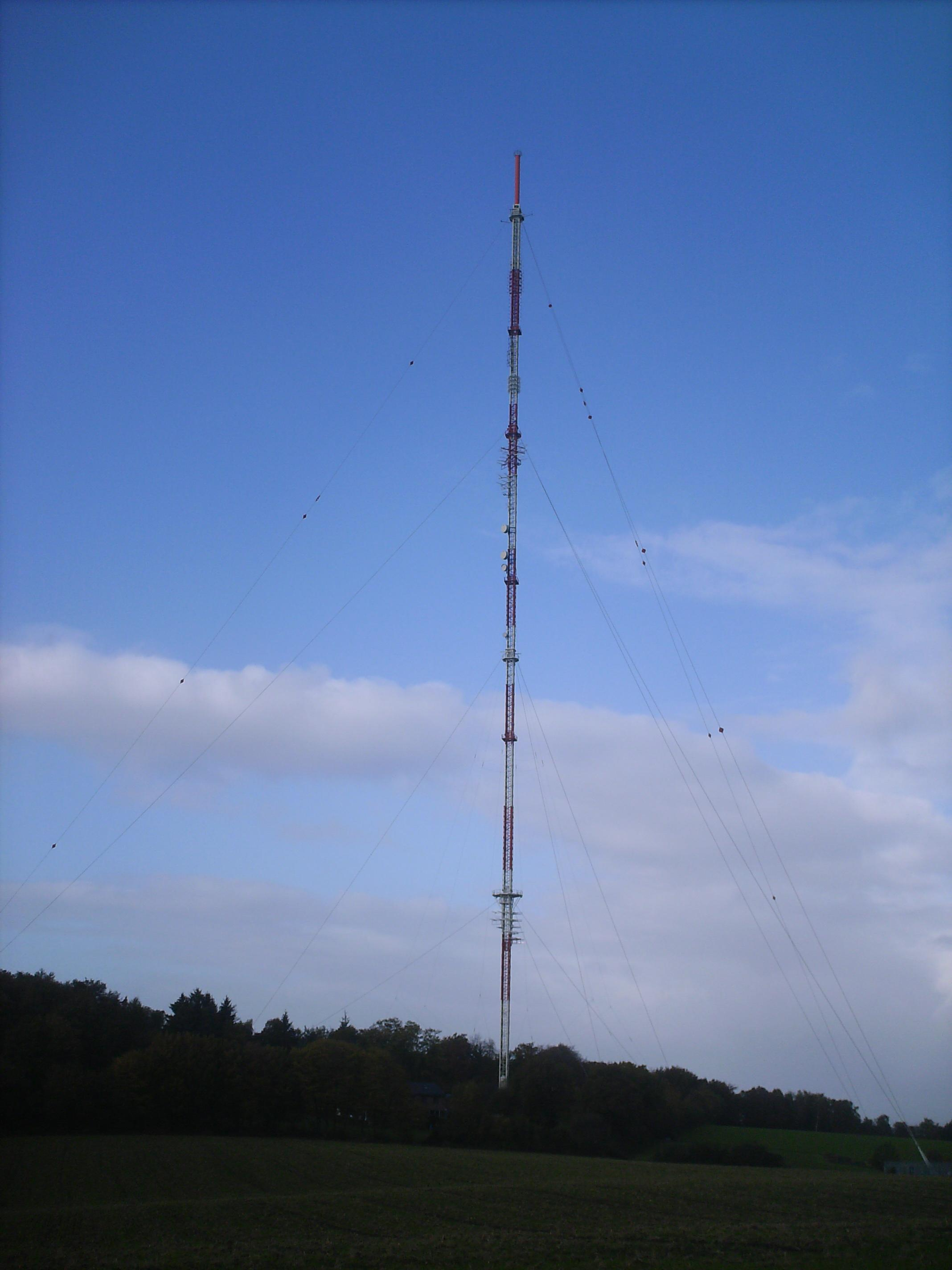
300 metre tall radio mast Langenberg-Hordt

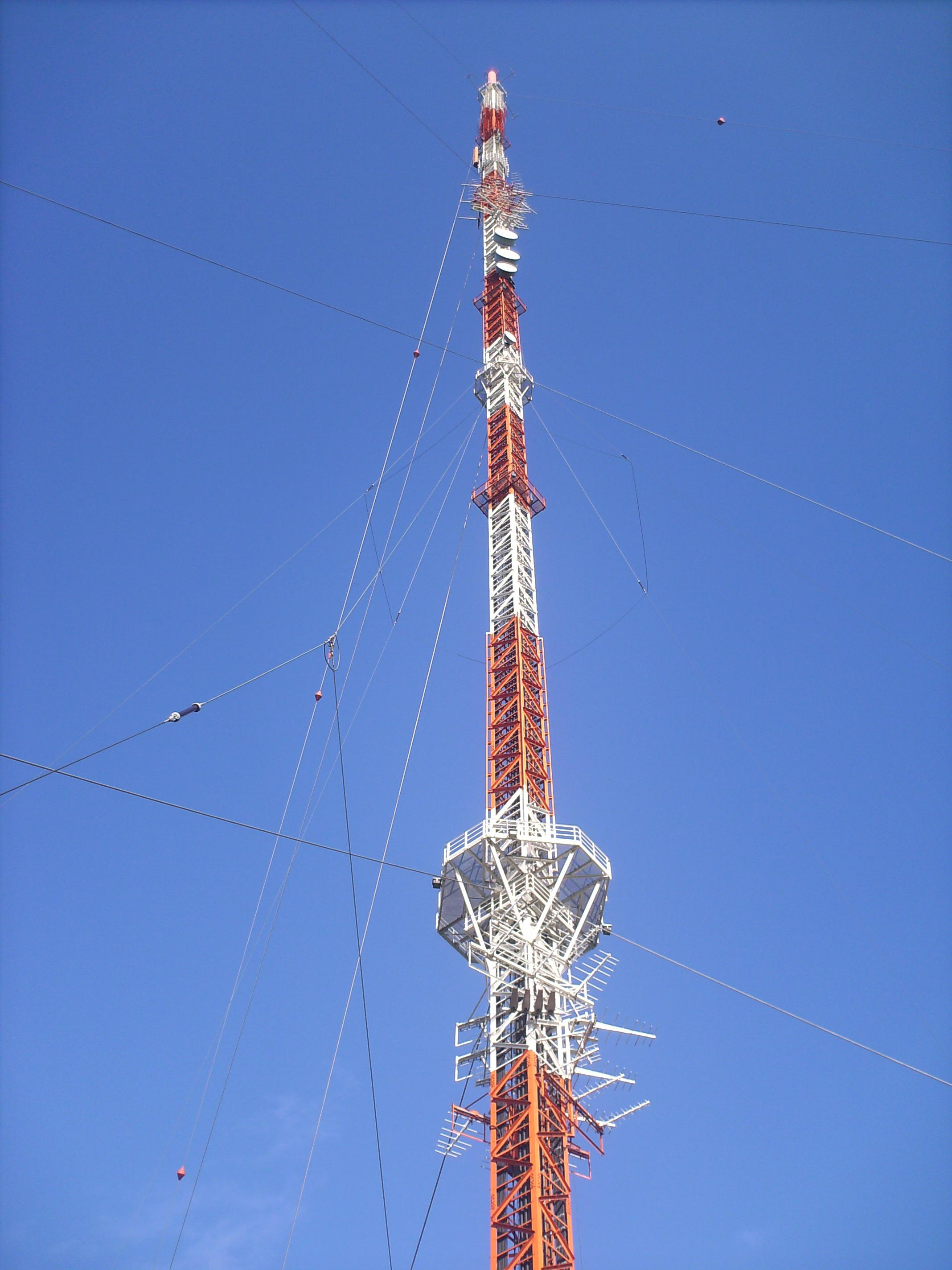
Close-up view at radio mast Langenberg-Hordt

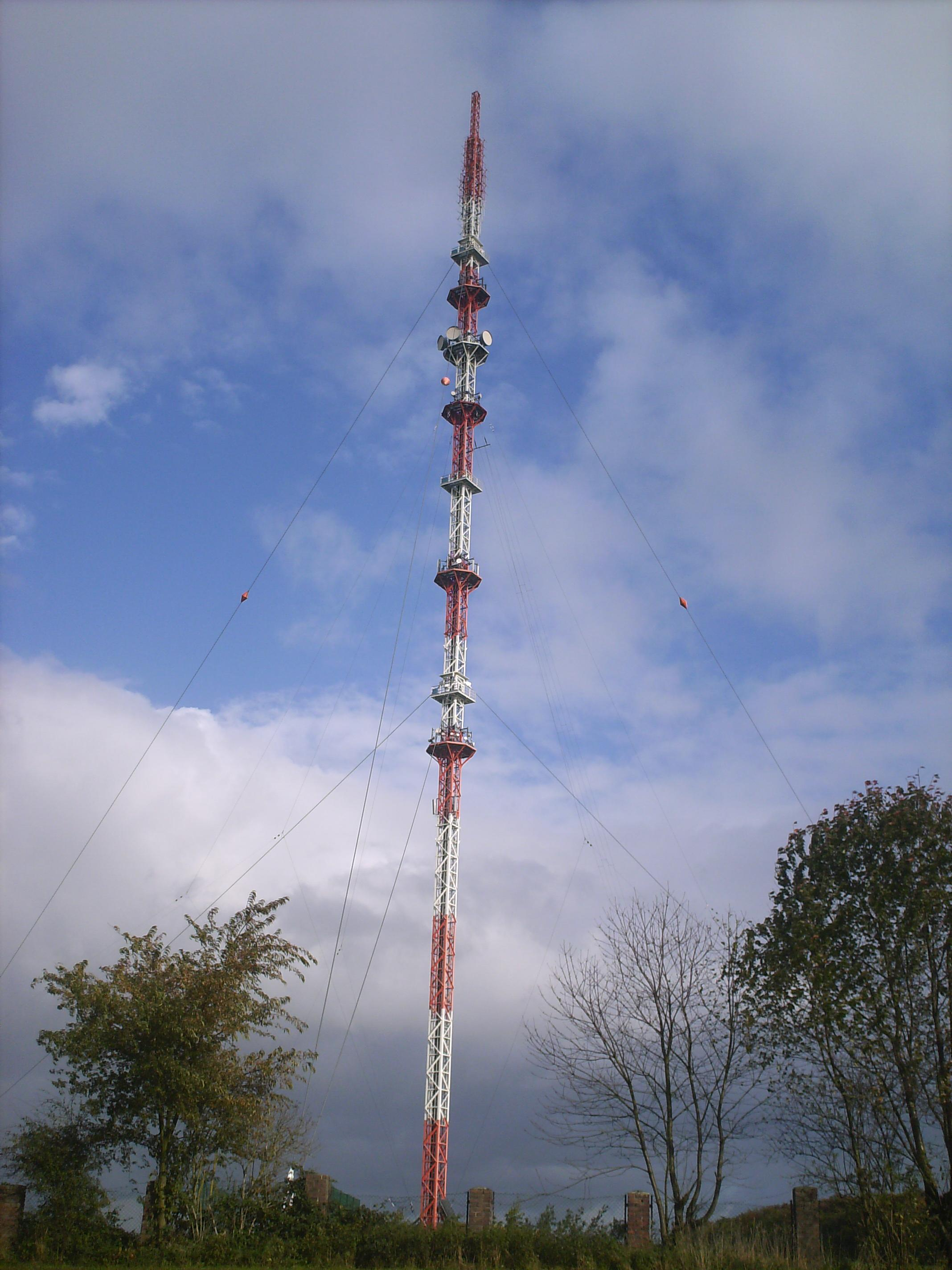
170 metre tall radio mast Langenberg-Rommel

The Langenberg transmission tower (also translated as "Sender Langenberg" or "Transmission Facility Langenberg") is a broadcasting station for analog FM Radio and Digital-TV (DVB-T2 HD) signals. It is located in Langenberg, Velbert, Germany and owned and operated by Westdeutscher Rundfunk, WDR.

The history of the transmitting site is very changing. The transmitter first went into service in 1927 with 60 kilowatts (kW) of power and a T-aerial hanging on two 100-metre freestanding steel-frame towers insulated against ground.

== History ==
In 1926 the „Westdeutschen Funkstunde“ and an association of locals agreed to build the transmitter tower in Langenberg. On Januar 15. 1927 the transmitter was inaugurated.

In the early 1930s, communist underground groups tried to manipulate the line from the studio to the transmitter in order to broadcast their own propaganda. Their attempts failed, but they did manage to attach a red star to the top of one of the towers, which was removed on the same day.

In 1934 the T-aerial was replaced by an aerial hanging from a 160-metre wood framework tower and the transmission power was increased to 100 kW. However, this tower was destroyed on October 10, 1935 by a tornado. After this a triangular aerial hung on three 45-metre freestanding towers was built; this went into service in December 1935. In 1940/41 a second aerial was installed on a 240-metre insulated guyed steel tube mast. The entire aerial system was destroyed by SS-Postschutz troops on April 12, 1945.

=== Post-1945 ===
After World War II, British forces built two triangular aerials mounted on 6 masts, each 50 metres high. One of these aerials was removed in 1948 and a 160-metre-high (520 ft) insulated radio mast built on its site. The other aerial was destroyed in a storm in 1949 which broke two of the three masts. The third mast was transformed into an AM transmitter and was in service until 1957. In 1949 a second radio mast with a height of 120 metres was built, and in 1952 a third guyed mast followed with a height of 210 metres for FM and TV. The 120-metre mast was used as an AM transmitter and was insulated against ground, while the 210-metre mast, used eventually for TV and FM broadcasts, was grounded.

=== The 1960s ===
In the middle of the 1960s the transmission power of the AM transmitter was enormously increased and its frequency was changed to the almost clear frequency of 1586 kHz which allowed night-time reception, even in the USA. This 120-metre radio mast was reduced to 95 metres and it was equipped with two separation insulators.

=== The 1970s ===
In course of the workout of the Geneva Frequency Plan of 1975, the facility lost the exclusive frequency of 1586 kHz and the transmitter was retuned to 1593 kHz. Because this frequency is used by other broadcasters, interference problems occurred at night-time in spite of the 800 kW transmitting power. As compensation, station owner WDR was allotted a second medium wave frequency of 720 kHz for daytime transmission only.

=== The 1980s ===
Between 1988 and 1990, the 95-metre mediumwave mast and the 210-metre TV- and FM-mast were replaced by a 301-metre-high (988 ft) guyed steel-framework grounded radio mast with a cage aerial for mediumwave in its lower sections.

=== The 1990s ===
In 1993, the 1593 kHz mediumwave transmitter was shut down because some components had been manufactured with PCBs. 720 kHz remained in service, but it was not allowed to use this frequency for night transmission until new regulations were enacted in 1995.

At these point there were two radio masts in Langenberg: the 160-metre radio mast for medium wave and the 301-metre radio mast for MW, FM and TV. The shorter mast had to be renovated in 1996; unfortunately, one auxiliary rope tore during this work and the mast collapsed on September 2, 1996.

In 1995 the transmission power had to be reduced for ecological reasons. Until the early 1990s the whole radiated power in the AM range was 1000 kW (800 kW on 1593 kHz and 200 kW on 720 kHz), but after 1995 the transmitter was restricted to 85 kW. After the collapse of the 160-metre (520 ft) mast, radiation power of the AM transmitter was reduced to 20 kW.

Soon after the collapse of the 160-metre (520 ft) mast, WDR planned a new mast in the form of a guyed grounded steel framework with a height of 170 metres and a cage aerial. The medium wave frequency of 1593 kHz was given to Radio Free Europe. The 720 kHz transmitter was fitted with a directional antenna that minimized propagation of signals westward. Construction of the new mast started in the middle of 1999, but problems delayed its inauguration until July 2000. After the inauguration of the new 170-metre radio mast, transmitter power on medium wave could be once again increased to 85 kW.

== See also ==
- List of masts
- List of towers
- List of catastrophic collapses of broadcast masts and towers
- de:Rundfunksender Langenberg
