= Jeddo, Japan =

Anglicizations of Edo, Japan

Jeddo and Yedo or Yeddo are anglicisations referring to the town and port of Edo, Japan and the adjacent large bay, and generally to the ruling Tokugawa shogunate of Japan during the 1850s and 1860s, which was based in Edo. After 1868, Edo was renamed Tokyo. The names Jeddo and Yedo became commonly used by English-speaking people in the mid-1800s, following the expedition of Commodore Matthew C. Perry, which resulted in the opening of Japan to trade. Neither name is in common use today, as a name of reference for Edo, or the bay, or the Tokugawa shogunate associated with Edo. Following the Perry Expedition, there was an increase in popular interest in Japan, and a number of American communities were named Jeddo or Yeddo.

== Anglicizations for the port of Edo and Edo Bay in Japan ==
Jeddo and Yedo are called anglicizations because they are a rendering into the English language of the verbal sound of the name of Edo. Edo was the site of Edo Castle, which was the base for the Tokugawa shogunate (also known as the Tokugawa bakufu and the Edo bakufu), a feudal regime that ruled Japan from 1603 to 1868, in the name of the Japanese emperor who resided in Kyoto castle. In 1868, the shogunate was abolished during the Meiji Restoration, after which the name of Edo was changed to Tokyo.

=== Role of Matthew C. Perry ===
When visited by commodore Matthew C. Perry, Edo (literally meaning "bay-entrance" or "estuary") had grown to a sophisticated urban city of roughly one million people, and was a busy port at the upper end of Edo Bay. This large bay was the venue for Perry's early contact and later negotiations with the Japanese Tokugawa shogunate based at Edo in 1852, 1853, and 1854, which resulted in treaties in 1856 opening Japan to trade with the United States and other countries. Perry published a three-volume account of the expedition in 1856, entitled Narrative of the Expedition of an American Squadron to the China Seas and Japan. In that text, Perry referred to the port of Edo, as well as Edo Bay, using the romanized name of "Yedo". Later books about Pery's expedition used both Yedo and Jeddo for Edo.

=== Period of use of "Jeddo" and "Yedo" ===
References to Jeddo by English speakers increasingly appear during and after the 1850s, continuing for several decades, followed by a slow reduction of usage after the transfer of power in Japan in 1868 resulted in the change of name from Edo to Tokyo. The reference to Jeddo is thus most commonly found in English publications after the mid-1850s. An article dated March 15, 1856 refers to an earthquake in Jeddo, Japan. Another New York Times article from 1861 refers to Edo as Jeddo, in an article about ministers of European powers fleeing Edo after violence there. Books on travel to Japan in the 1850s and 1860s refer to Jeddo as the capital of Japan.

Today the use of the words "Jeddo" and "Yedo" or "Yeddo" is very rare among English speakers or in print.

== Names adopted for American places ==
The visits by Perry to Japan, as described in his three-volume account, resulted in an increase in popular interest in America about Japan. Japan's previous isolation, the new opportunities for profitable trade, and the revelations of the sophistication of the Japanese in arts, aesthetics and manner resulted in a growth of appreciation of Japanese culture in Europe and the United States known as Japonism. This interest was reflected in the naming of new places with "Jeddo" or "Yeddo". Preference of Americans for "Jeddo" over "Yedo" (or "Yeddo") may be inferred from the fact that ten places in the United States bear the name "Jeddo", but only one town bears a variant of the name of "Yedo".

There are ten places named Jeddo, or a variant, in the United States. These are:

- Jeddo, Pennsylvania, in Luzerne County, a borough, a locale and a populated place.
- Jeddo, Michigan, in St. Clair County, a populated place.
- Jeddo, Texas, in Bastrop County, a cemetery, and a populated place.
- Jeddo, New York, in Orleans County, a populated place, and a creek.
- Jeddo, Alabama, in Franklin County, historical post office.
- Jeddo, Alabama, in Monroe County, historical post office, and populated place.
- Jeddo, Missouri, in Knox County, a township, populated place and school.
- Jeddo City, Iowa, in Harrison County, a historical post office and a locale.
- Jeddo Run, Ohio, in Jefferson County, a creek.
- Jeddoe, Ohio, in Portage County, a populated place.

There is one town using a variant of Yedo as a place name:

- Yeddo, Indiana, in Fountain County, a populated place.

== See also ==
- Edo
- Tokugawa shogunate
- Narrative of the Expedition of an American Squadron to the China Seas and Japan
- Matthew C. Perry
- Tokyo Bay
- Ezo, a former name for the islands north of Japan with several romanizations.
