= Jeddo, Missouri =

Unincorporated community in Missouri, United States

Coordinates: 40°06′01″N 91°58′07″W

Jeddo is an unincorporated community in Knox County, in the U.S. state of Missouri.

The first settlement at Jeddo was made in the 1830s. When the railroad bypassed Jeddo in 1872, business activities shifted to other nearby places, and the population dwindled.
