= Colony, Missouri =

Unincorporated community in Missouri, United States

Coordinates: 40.2539287°N 91.9907307°W

Colony is an unincorporated community in Knox County, in the U.S. state of Missouri. It is situated on in Colony Township, at the K&V junction.

== History ==
Colony was originally called Kentucky Colony, and under the latter name settlement was made in the early 1840s by some of the first settlers in the county, a group of four or five pioneer families from Kentucky, about two miles northeast of the present site of Colony. A post office called Colony was established in 1848, and remained in operation until 1907.
