= Knox County, Missouri =

County in Missouri, United States

- County
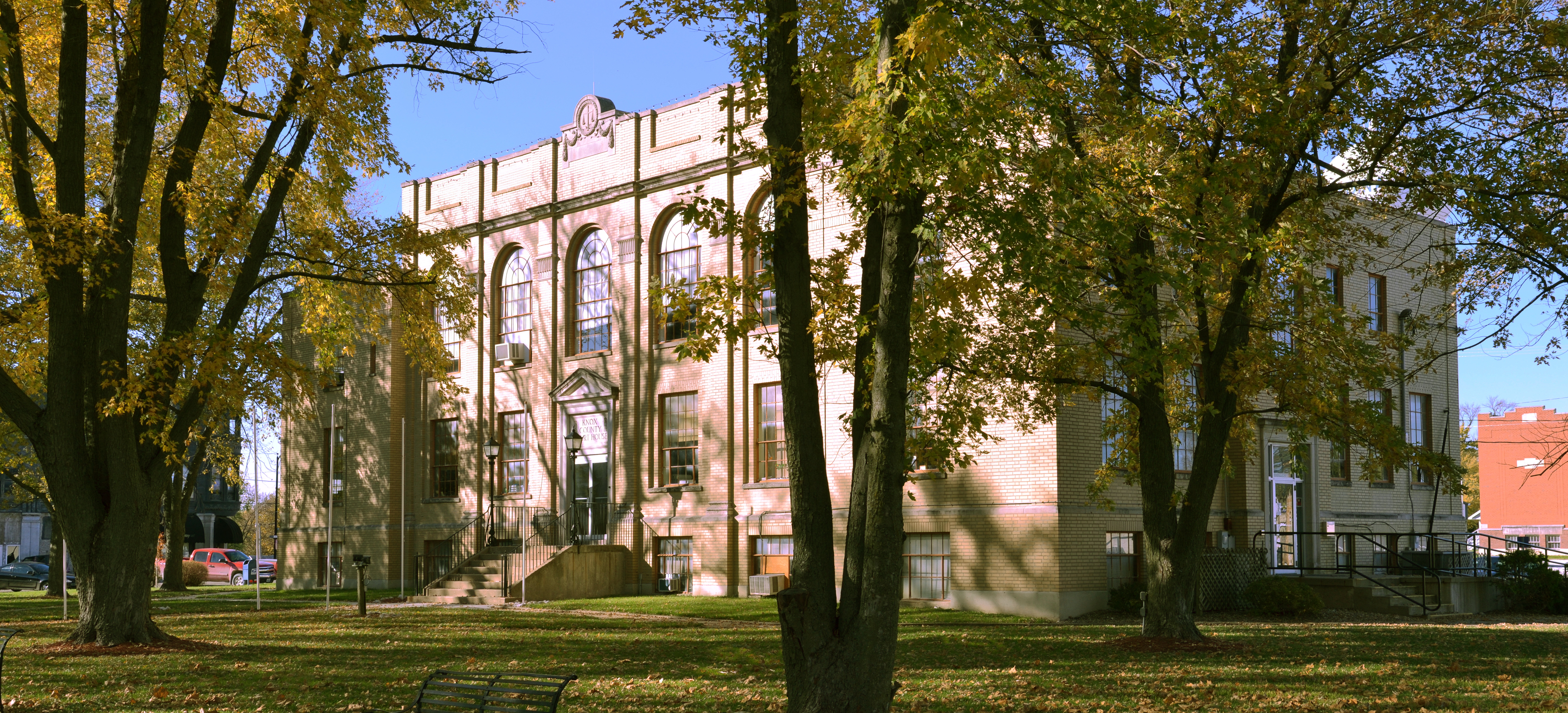
- Knox County Courthouse in Edina

- Location within the U.S. state of Missouri
- Coordinates: 40°07′N 92°09′W
- Country: United States
- State: Missouri
- Founded: February 14, 1845
- Named for: Henry Knox
- Seat: Edina
- Largest city: Edina

Area
  - Total: 507 sq mi (1,310 km^{2})
  - Land: 504 sq mi (1,310 km^{2})
  - Water: 2.8 sq mi (7.3 km^{2}) 0.6%

Population (2020)
  - Total: 3,744
  - Estimate (2025): 3,728 ▼
  - Density: 7.4/sq mi (2.9/km^{2})
- Time zone: UTC−6 (Central)
  - Summer (DST): UTC−5 (CDT)
- Congressional district: 6th
- Website: www.knoxcountymo.org

Knox County is a county located in the northeast portion of the U.S. state of Missouri. As of the 2020 census, its population was 3,744, making it the third-least populous county in Missouri. Its county seat is Edina. The county was organized February 14, 1845, and named for U.S. Secretary of War General Henry Knox.

== Civil War ==
A battle was fought during the American Civil War at Newark, involving Joseph C. Porter on August 1, 1862.

== Geography ==
According to the U.S. Census Bureau, the county has a total area of 507 square miles (1,310 km^{2}), of which 504 square miles (1,310 km^{2}) is land and 2.8 square miles (7.3 km^{2}) (0.6%) is water.

=== Adjacent counties ===
- Scotland County (north)
- Clark County (northeast)
- Lewis County (east)
- Shelby County (south)
- Macon County (southwest)
- Adair County (west)

=== Major highways ===
- Route 6
- Route 11
- Route 15
- Route 151
- Route 156

== Demographics ==
Historical population
Census	Pop.	Note	%±
1850	2,894		—
1860	8,727		201.6%
1870	10,974		25.7%
1880	13,047		18.9%
1890	13,501		3.5%
1900	13,479		−0.2%
1910	12,403		−8.0%
1920	10,783		−13.1%
1930	9,658		−10.4%
1940	8,878		−8.1%
1950	7,617		−14.2%
1960	6,558		−13.9%
1970	5,692		−13.2%
1980	5,508		−3.2%
1990	4,482		−18.6%
2000	4,361		−2.7%
2010	4,131		−5.3%
2020	3,744		−9.4%
2025 (est.)	3,728	▼	−0.4%
U.S. Decennial Census; 1790-1960 1900-1990; 1990-2000 2010 2025

=== 2020 census ===
As of the 2020 census, the county had a population of 3,744. The median age was 44.1 years. 24.2% of residents were under the age of 18 and 23.1% of residents were 65 years of age or older. For every 100 females there were 96.0 males, and for every 100 females age 18 and over there were 94.4 males age 18 and over.

The racial makeup of the county was 95.4% White, 0.5% Black or African American, 0.2% American Indian and Alaska Native, 0.5% Asian, 0.0% Native Hawaiian and Pacific Islander, 0.4% from some other race, and 2.9% from two or more races. Hispanic or Latino residents of any race comprised 0.6% of the population. The detail is provided in the table below.

There were 1,500 households in the county, of which 29.4% had children under the age of 18 living with them and 25.1% had a female householder with no spouse or partner present. About 33.0% of all households were made up of individuals and 18.7% had someone living alone who was 65 years of age or older.

There were 1,934 housing units, of which 22.4% were vacant. Among occupied housing units, 79.9% were owner-occupied and 20.1% were renter-occupied. The homeowner vacancy rate was 2.5% and the rental vacancy rate was 14.0%.

0.0% of residents lived in urban areas, while 100.0% lived in rural areas.

=== Racial and ethnic composition ===
Knox County, Missouri – Racial and ethnic composition Note: the US Census treats Hispanic/Latino as an ethnic category. This table excludes Latinos from the racial categories and assigns them to a separate category. Hispanics/Latinos may be of any race.
Race / Ethnicity (NH = Non-Hispanic)	Pop 1980	Pop 1990	Pop 2000	Pop 2010	Pop 2020	% 1980	% 1990	% 2000	% 2010	% 2020
White alone (NH)	5,474	4,454	4,277	4,027	3,573	99.38%	99.38%	98.07%	97.48%	95.43%
Black or African American alone (NH)	6	6	4	14	20	0.11%	0.13%	0.09%	0.34%	0.53%
Native American or Alaska Native alone (NH)	5	10	1	7	5	0.09%	0.22%	0.02%	0.17%	0.13%
Asian alone (NH)	8	3	4	8	18	0.15%	0.07%	0.09%	0.19%	0.48%
Native Hawaiian or Pacific Islander alone (NH)	x	x	0	0	0	x	x	0.00%	0.00%	0.00%
Other race alone (NH)	7	0	2	0	6	0.13%	0.00%	0.05%	0.00%	0.16%
Mixed race or Multiracial (NH)	x	x	47	41	99	x	x	1.08%	0.99%	2.64%
Hispanic or Latino (any race)	8	9	26	34	23	0.15%	0.20%	0.60%	0.82%	0.61%
Total	5,508	4,482	4,361	4,131	3,744	100.00%	100.00%	100.00%	100.00%	100.00%

=== 2010 census ===
As of the census of 2010, there were 4,131 people in the county, organized into 1,791 households and 1,217 families. The population density was 9 people per square mile (3.5 people/km^{2}). There were 2,317 housing units at an average density of 5 units per square mile (1.9/km^{2}). The racial makeup of the county was 98.51% White, 0.09% Black or African American, 0.09% Asian, 0.02% Native American, 0.16% from other races, and 1.12% from two or more races. Approximately 0.60% of the population were Hispanic or Latino of any race.

There were 1,791 households, out of which 27.90% had children under the age of 18 living with them, 57.50% were married couples living together, 6.90% had a female householder with no husband present, and 32.00% were non-families. 29.30% of all households were made up of individuals, and 16.00% had someone living alone who was 65 years of age or older. The average household size was 2.38 and the average family size was 2.93.

24.90% of the county's population was under the age of 18, 6.20% from 18 to 24, 23.70% from 25 to 44, 23.90% from 45 to 64, and 21.20% who were 65 years of age or older. The median age was 42 years. For every 100 females there were 92.9 males. For every 100 females age 18 and over, there were 91.6 males.

The median income for a household in the county was $27,124, and the median income for a family was $31,741. Males had a median income of $22,636 versus $18,902 for females. The per capita income for the county was $13,075. 18.00% of the population and 12.90% of families were below the poverty line. Out of the total population, 24.10% of those under the age of 18 and 16.50% of those 65 and older were living below the poverty line.

The TFR for Knox County in 2004 was relatively high at 2.64, despite the population being 98% white.

== Education ==
Four school districts have sections of the county: Knox County R-I School District, Adair County R-II School District, La Plata R-II School District, and Lewis County C-1 School District.

=== Public schools ===
- Knox County R-I School District – Edina - The only school district that operates schools in the county boundaries:
  - Knox County Elementary School (PK-06)
  - Knox County High School (07-12)

=== Public libraries ===
- Northeast Missouri Library Service

== Politics ==
=== Local ===
The Democratic Party mostly controls politics at the local level in Knox County. Democrats hold all but five of the elected positions in the county.

Knox County, Missouri

Elected countywide officials
Assessor	Anita James	Republican
Circuit Clerk	James Gibbons	Democratic
County Clerk	Marlene Spory	Republican
Collector	Brent Karhoff	Republican
Commissioner (presiding)	Evan Glasgow	Republican
Commissioner (district 1)	Terry (“Red”) Callahan	Democratic
Commissioner (district 2)	Roger Parton	Democratic
Coroner	Jeffrey Doss	Democratic
Prosecuting Attorney	David M. Brown	Republican
Public Administrator	Theresa Allen-Hamlin	Republican
Recorder	Sandy Woods	Democratic
Sheriff	Allen Gudehus	Democratic
Surveyor	Dilbert Sullivan	Democratic
Treasurer	Donnie Davis	Democratic

=== State ===
Past Gubernatorial Elections Results
Year	Republican	Democratic	Third Parties
2024	84.07% 1,462	14.09% 245	1.84% 32
2020	82.66% 1,516	16.03% 294	1.31% 24
2016	61.61% 1,125	36.80% 672	1.59% 29
2012	47.35% 912	50.16% 966	2.49% 49
2008	58.88% 1,180	39.57% 793	1.55% 31
2004	67.41% 1,328	31.62% 623	0.96% 19
2000	55.48% 1,124	43.34% 878	1.19% 24
1996	30.52% 623	67.71% 1,382	1.76% 36

All of Knox County is included in Missouri's 4th District in the Missouri House of Representatives and is represented by Craig Redmon (R-Canton).

Missouri House of Representatives — District 4 — Knox County (2016)
Party	Candidate	Votes	%	±%
Republican	Craig Redmon	1,612	100.00%	

Missouri House of Representatives — District 4 — Knox County (2014)
Party	Candidate	Votes	%	±%
Republican	Craig Redmon	1,144	100.00%	

Missouri House of Representatives — District 4 — Knox County (2012)
Party	Candidate	Votes	%	±%
Republican	Craig Redmon	1,587	100.00%	

All of Knox County is a part of Missouri's 18th District in the Missouri Senate and is currently represented by Brian Munzlinger (R-Williamstown).

Missouri Senate — District 18 — Knox County (2014)
Party	Candidate	Votes	%	±%
Republican	Brian Munzlinger	1,174	100.00%	

=== Federal ===
U.S. Senate — Missouri — Knox County (2016)
Party	Candidate	Votes	%	±%
Republican	Roy Blunt	1,208	66.19%	+19.59
Democratic	Jason Kander	558	30.58%	−19.11
Libertarian	Jonathan Dine	29	1.59%	−2.12
Green	Johnathan McFarland	16	0.88%	+0.88
Constitution	Fred Ryman	14	0.77%	+0.77

U.S. Senate — Missouri — Knox County (2012)
Party	Candidate	Votes	%	±%
Republican	Todd Akin	905	46.60%	
Democratic	Claire McCaskill	965	49.69%	
Libertarian	Jonathan Dine	72	3.71%	

All of Knox County is included in Missouri's 6th Congressional District and is currently represented by Sam Graves (R-Tarkio) in the U.S. House of Representatives.

U.S. House of Representatives — Missouri's 6th Congressional District — Knox County (2016)
Party	Candidate	Votes	%	±%
Republican	Sam Graves	1,425	80.19%	+4.74
Democratic	David M. Blackwell	317	17.84%	−4.07
Libertarian	Russ Lee Monchil	24	1.35%	−1.29
Green	Mike Diel	11	0.62%	

U.S. House of Representatives — Missouri’s 6th Congressional District — Knox County (2014)
Party	Candidate	Votes	%	±%
Republican	Sam Graves	971	75.45%	+7.72
Democratic	Bill Hedge	282	21.91%	−8.55
Libertarian	Russ Lee Monchil	34	2.64%	+0.83

U.S. House of Representatives — Missouri's 6th Congressional District — Knox County (2012)
Party	Candidate	Votes	%	±%
Republican	Sam Graves	1,232	67.73%	
Democratic	Kyle Yarber	554	30.46%	
Libertarian	Russ Lee Monchil	33	1.81%	

United States presidential election results for Knox County, Missouri
Year	Republican		Democratic		Third party(ies)	
Year	No.	%	No.	%	No.	%
1888	1,371	44.10%	1,661	53.43%	77	2.48%
1892	968	31.70%	1,472	48.20%	614	20.10%
1896	1,246	35.95%	2,185	63.04%	35	1.01%
1900	1,344	40.36%	1,908	57.30%	78	2.34%
1904	1,321	45.15%	1,527	52.19%	78	2.67%
1908	1,339	43.72%	1,652	53.93%	72	2.35%
1912	1,092	34.73%	1,666	52.99%	386	12.28%
1916	1,460	45.91%	1,657	52.11%	63	1.98%
1920	2,749	54.32%	2,250	44.46%	62	1.23%
1924	2,288	43.83%	2,722	52.15%	210	4.02%
1928	2,628	54.21%	2,213	45.65%	7	0.14%
1932	1,465	32.11%	3,045	66.75%	52	1.14%
1936	2,134	41.09%	3,030	58.35%	29	0.56%
1940	2,370	47.56%	2,594	52.06%	19	0.38%
1944	2,057	51.32%	1,943	48.48%	8	0.20%
1948	1,620	41.66%	2,268	58.32%	1	0.03%
1952	2,229	52.77%	1,988	47.06%	7	0.17%
1956	1,934	51.11%	1,850	48.89%	0	0.00%
1960	1,874	51.06%	1,796	48.94%	0	0.00%
1964	1,305	38.50%	2,085	61.50%	0	0.00%
1968	1,562	49.29%	1,257	39.67%	350	11.04%
1972	1,896	64.78%	1,031	35.22%	0	0.00%
1976	1,216	47.57%	1,319	51.60%	21	0.82%
1980	1,475	54.43%	1,187	43.80%	48	1.77%
1984	1,513	57.97%	1,097	42.03%	0	0.00%
1988	1,212	49.03%	1,255	50.77%	5	0.20%
1992	724	32.01%	1,010	44.65%	528	23.34%
1996	862	42.65%	891	44.09%	268	13.26%
2000	1,226	59.66%	787	38.30%	42	2.04%
2004	1,207	61.02%	761	38.47%	10	0.51%
2008	1,212	59.73%	759	37.41%	58	2.86%
2012	1,205	61.57%	698	35.67%	54	2.76%
2016	1,416	75.72%	379	20.27%	75	4.01%
2020	1,486	80.15%	340	18.34%	28	1.51%
2024	1,479	81.71%	311	17.18%	20	1.10%

== Communities ==
=== Cities ===
- Baring
- Edina (county seat)
- Hurdland
- Knox City

=== Villages ===
- Newark
- Novelty

=== Census-designated place ===
- Plevna

=== Other unincorporated place ===
- Colony
- Fabius
- Goodland
- Greensburg
- Hedge City
- Jeddo
- Kenwood
- Locust Hill
- Millport

=== Townships ===
Knox County is divided into 13 townships:

- Bee Ridge Township
- Benton Township
- Bourbon Township
- Center Township
- Colony Township
- Fabius Township
- Greensburg Township
- Jeddo Township
- Liberty Township
- Lyon Township
- Myrtle Township
- Salt River Township
- Shelton Township

== Notable people ==
- Terry Joyce, collegiate football All-American and professional football player.
- George Turner, U.S. Senator

== See also ==
- List of counties in Missouri
- National Register of Historic Places listings in Knox County, Missouri
