= List of tallest structures in the United States by height =

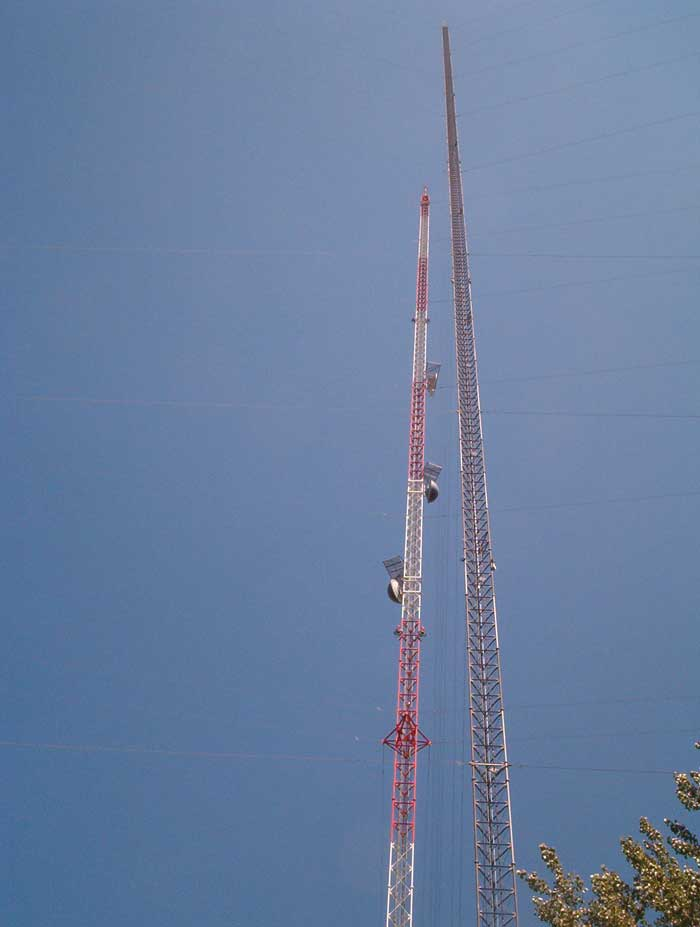
The KXJB-TV mast is the tallest structure in the United States, at 2,060 ft (628 m) tall

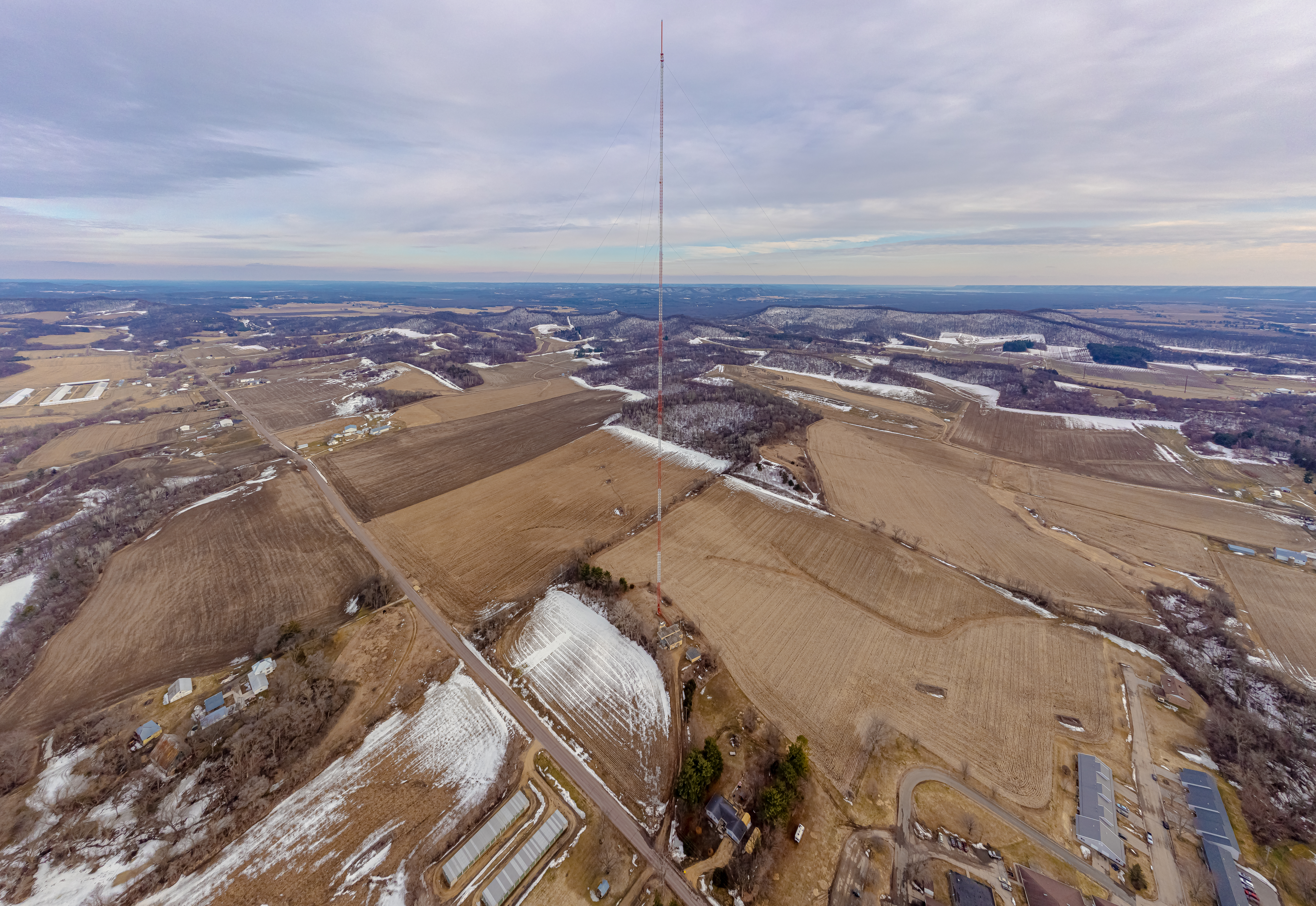
Galesville, Wisconsin WKBT-DT tower

This is a list of the tallest structures in the US that are at least 350 meters, ordered by height. Most are guyed masts used for FM- and TV-broadcasting:

Height	Structure	Location	Coordinates	Structure Type	Comments
630 m	KRDK-TV mast	Galesburg, North Dakota	47°16′45″N 97°20′27″W	Guyed Mast	
624.5 m	KXTV/KOVR tower	Walnut Grove, California	38°14′23″N 121°30′06″W	Guyed Mast	
610.5 m	KGLK-FM Lake Jackson Tower	Lake Jackson, Texas		Guyed Mast	
610 m	Petronius Platform	Gulf of Mexico		Oil Platform	approx. 75 meters visible above water surface
609.6 m	KCAU TV Tower	Sioux City, Iowa		Guyed Mast	
609.6 m	KATV Tower	Redfield, Arkansas		Guyed Mast	collapsed on January 11, 2008
609.6 m	WECT TV6 Tower	Colly Township, North Carolina		Guyed Mast	demolished in 2012
609.6 m	KOLR Tower	Fordland, Missouri	37°13′08″N 092°56′56″W	Guyed Mast	
609.6 m	WOI Tower	Alleman, Iowa	41°48′33″N 093°36′54″W	Guyed Mast	
609.6 m	Des Moines Hearst-Argyle Television Tower Alleman	Alleman, Iowa		Guyed Mast	
609.6 m	Diversified Communications Tower	Floyd Dale, South Carolina		Guyed Mast	
609.6 m	AFLAC Tower	Rowley, Iowa		Guyed Mast	
609.6 m	WBTV-Tower	Dallas, North Carolina	35°21′51″N 081°11′12″W	Guyed Mast	
609.6 m	Hearst-Argyle Tower	Walnut Grove, California		Guyed Mast	
609.6 m	WTTO Tower	Windham Springs, Alabama	33°28′51″N 087°24′03″W	Guyed Mast	
609.6 m	WCSC-Tower	Awendaw, South Carolina	32°55′29″N 079°41′57″W	Guyed Mast	
609.6 m	KTVE-Tower	Bolding, Arkansas	33°04′41″N 092°13′41″W	Guyed Mast	
609.6 m	WCTV Tower	Metcalf, Georgia	30°40′14″N 083°56′26″W	Guyed Mast	
609.6 m	TV Alabama Tower	Tuscaloosa County, Alabama		Guyed Mast	
609.6 m	KDLT Tower	Rowena, South Dakota	43°30′18″N 096°33′23″W	Guyed Mast	
609.6 m	KMOS TV Tower	Syracuse, Missouri		Guyed Mast	
609.6 m	Liberman Broadcasting Tower Era	Era, Texas		Guyed Mast	
609.6 m	Winnie Cumulus Broadcasting Tower	Winnie, Texas		Guyed Mast	
609.5 m	WRAL HDTV Mast	Auburn, North Carolina		Guyed Mast	
609.5 m	Perry Broadcasting Tower	Carnegie, Oklahoma	35°15′03″N 098°36′54″W	Guyed Mast	
609.4 m	KY3 Tower	Fordland, Missouri	37°10′26″N 92°56′28″W	Guyed Mast	
609.4 m	SpectraSite Tower Thomasville	Thomasville, Georgia		Guyed Mast	
609.3 m	KLDE Tower (KGLK)	Angleton, Texas	29°17′17″N 095°13′54″W	Guyed Mast	
609.3 m	WCKW/KSTE-Tower (Clear Channel Broadcasting Tower)	Vacherie, Louisiana		Guyed Mast	Collapsed due to Hurricane Ida in 2021
609.3 m	American Towers Tower Elkhart	Elkhart, Iowa		Guyed Mast	
609.3 m	Salem Radio Properties Tower	Collinsville, Texas	33°32′8″N 096°49′55″W	Guyed Mast	
609.3 m	Stowell Cumulus Broadcasting Tower	Stowell, Texas		Guyed Mast	
609.0 m	WEAU-TV, WAXX-FM	Fairchild, Wisconsin	44°39′50″N 090°57′41″W	Guyed Mast	Collapsed March 22, 2011; replacement tower completed December 13, 2011
609 m	WLBT Tower	Raymond, Mississippi	32°12′50″N 090°22′57″W	Guyed Mast	
609 m	WCIX TV Tower	Homestead, Florida		Guyed Mast	destroyed in 1992 by Hurricane Andrew
608.4 m	KYTV Tower 2	Marshfield, Missouri		Guyed Mast	
608.4 m	Hoyt Radio Tower	Hoyt, Colorado	39°55′22″N 103°58′18″W	Guyed Mast	
608.1 m	Service Broadcasting Tower Decatur	Decatur, Texas		Guyed Mast	
607.8 m	Channel 40 Tower	Walnut Grove, California		Guyed Mast	
607.8 m	WNCN Tower	Auburn, North Carolina		Guyed Mast	
607.7 m	Liberman Broadcasting Tower Devers	Devers, Texas		Guyed Mast	
607.2 m	KHYS Tower	Devers, Texas		Guyed Mast	
607 m	Clear Channel Broadcasting Tower Devers	Devers, Texas		Guyed Mast	
607 m	Media General Tower	Awendaw, South Carolina		Guyed Mast	
606.2 m	Eastern North Carolina Broadcasting Tower	Trenton, North Carolina		Guyed Mast	
606.2 m	WNCN Tower	Auburn, North Carolina		Guyed Mast	
605.6	KVLY-TV mast	Blanchard, North Dakota	47°20′32″N 097°17′21″W	Guyed Mast	
605 m	KELO TV Tower	Rowena, South Dakota		Guyed Mast	
605 m	WITN Tower (Gray Television Tower)	Grifton, North Carolina		Guyed Mast	
604.7 m	Noe Corp Tower	Columbia, Louisiana		Guyed Mast	
603.6 m	Pappas Telecasting Tower	Plymouth County, Iowa		Guyed Mast	
602 m	KHOU-TV Tower	Missouri City, Texas		Guyed Mast	
601.3 m	Richland Towers Tower Missouri City	Missouri City, Texas		Guyed Mast	
600.7 m	Senior Road Tower	Missouri City, Texas		Guyed Mast	
600.5 m	KTRK-TV Tower	Missouri City, Texas		Guyed Mast	
600.5 m	Houston Tower Joint Venture Tower	Missouri City, Texas		Guyed Mast	
600.5 m	American Towers Tower Missouri City	Missouri City, Texas		Guyed Mast	
600.4 m	KRIV-TV Tower	Missouri City, Texas	29°34′28″N 95°29′37″W	Guyed Mast	Stairway to Heaven
600 m	Mississippi Telecasting Tower	Inverness, Mississippi		Guyed Mast	
600 m	WCNC-TV Tower	Dallas, North Carolina		Guyed Mast	
600 m	Capstar Radio Tower	Middlesex, North Carolina		Guyed Mast	
599 m	KDUH/CH4 TV Mast	Hemingford, Nebraska		Guyed Mast	collapsed in 2003
598.3 m	American Towers Tower Liverpool	Liverpool, Texas		Guyed Mast	
598 m	Media General Tower Dillon	Dillon, South Carolina		Guyed Mast	
597.4 m	Duffy-Shamrock Joint Venture Tower	Bertram, Texas		Guyed Mast	
597.4 m	AMFM Tower Collinsville	Collinsville, Texas		Guyed Mast	
596.6 m	Cosmos Broadcasting Tower Winnabow	Winnabow, North Carolina		Guyed Mast	
592.6 m	Spectra Site Communications Tower Robertsdale	Robertsdale, Alabama		Guyed Mast	
592.4 m	CBC Real Estate Co. Inc Tower	Dallas, North Carolina		Guyed Mast	
589.4 m	Cosmos Broadcasting Tower Grady	Grady, Alabama		Guyed Mast	
587.9 m	American Towers Tower Columbia	Columbia, Louisiana		Guyed Mast	
587.6 m	KKHT Radio Mast	Splendora, Texas		Guyed Mast	
587.3 m	Cedar Rapids TV Tower	Walker City, Iowa	42°18′59.0″N 091°51′31.6″W	Guyed Mast	
586.4 m	Channel 6 Tower Eddy	Eddy, Texas		Guyed Mast	
586.1 m	KYAL-FM Tower	Checotah, Oklahoma	35°24′48.4″N 095°21′55.9″W	Guyed Mast	
585.2 m	Entravision Texas Tower	Greenwood, Texas		Guyed Mast	
584 m	Multimedia Associates Tower	Rio Grande City, Texas		Guyed Mast	
582.8 m	WFMY Tower	Greensboro, North Carolina		Guyed Mast	
582.3 m	American Towers Tower Randleman	Randleman, North Carolina		Guyed Mast	
581.8 m	KTUL Tower Coweta	Coweta, Oklahoma		Guyed Mast	
579.9 m	American Towers Tower Robertsdale	Robertsdale, Alabama		Guyed Mast	
579.7 m	Baldpate Platform	Garden Banks, Gulf of Mexico (offshore)			approx. 76 meters visible above water surface
579.4 m	WTVY-TV Tower	Bethlehem, Florida	30°55′11.7″N 85°44′29.5″W	Guyed Mast	
578.8 m	Redfield Tower	Grant County, Arkansas		Guyed Mast	
572.8 m	Cox Radio Tower (KHPT)	Shepard, Texas		Guyed Mast	
572.7 m	Media General Tower Spanish Fort	Spanish Fort, Alabama		Guyed Mast	
571.1 m	WFTV Tower Saint Cloud	Saint Cloud, Florida	28°34′7″N 081°03′13″W	Guyed Mast	
567.1 m	Capstar Radio Operating Gray Court Tower	Gray Court, South Carolina		Guyed Mast	
565.1 m	KLKN Tower	Genoa, Nebraska	41°32′28″N 097°40′46″W	Guyed Mast	
561.3 m	Pinnacle Towers Tower Princeton	Princeton, Florida		Guyed Mast	
561.1 m	WTVJ Tower Princeton	Princeton, Florida	25°32′25″N 080°28′06″W	Guyed Mast	
559.6 m	Pappas Partnership Stations Tower Gretna	Gretna, Nebraska	41°4′14″N 96°13′33″W	Guyed Mast	
559 m	KBIM Tower	Roswell, New Mexico	33°03′20″N 103°49′14″W	Guyed Mast	
559 m	Tulsa Tower Joint Venture Tower Oneta	Oneta, Oklahoma		Guyed Mast	
547.7 m	SBA Towers Tower Hayneville	Hayneville, Alabama		Guyed Mast	
547.7 m	Channel 32 Limited Partnership Tower	Hayneville, Alabama		Guyed Mast	
546.5 m	Cosmos Broadcasting Tower Egypt	Egypt, Arkansas		Guyed Mast	
546.6 m	KATC Tower Kaplan	Kaplan, Louisiana		Guyed Mast	
546.2 m	One World Trade Center	New York, New York		Skyscraper	Rebuilt following destruction of World Trade Towers in 9/11 attacks
545.8 m	Raycom Media Tower Mooringsport	Mooringsport, Louisiana		Guyed Mast	
542.8 m	Pinnacle Towers Tower Mooringsport	Mooringsport, Louisiana		Guyed Mast	
540 m	KLFY TV Tower Maxie	Maxie, Acadia Parish, Louisiana		Guyed Mast	
538.3 m	American Towers Tower Elgin-29045	Elgin, South Carolina		Guyed Mast	also known as WOLO TV Tower
538.2 m	Cusseta Richland Towers Tower	Cusseta, Georgia		Guyed Mast	
537.9 m	Cox Radio Tower Braselton	Braselton, Georgia		Guyed Mast	
535.5 m	Alabama Telecasters Tower	Gordonville, Alabama		Guyed Mast	
534.3 m	Nexstar Broadcasting Tower Vivian	Vivian, Louisiana		Guyed Mast	
534 m	WIMZ-FM-Tower	Knoxville, Tennessee	36°08′06″N 083°43′29″W	Guyed Mast	
533.1 m	Capitol Broadcasting Tower Broadway	Broadway, North Carolina		Guyed Mast	dismantled
533.1 m	Capitol Broadcasting Tower Columbia	Columbia, North Carolina		Guyed Mast	
533 m	Ray-Com Media Tower Cusseta	Cusseta, Georgia		Guyed Mast	
530 m	WAVE-Mast	La Grange, Kentucky	38°27′23″N 085°25′28″W	Guyed Mast	no longer in use
529.4 m	Louisiana Television Broadcasting Tower Sunshine	Sunshine, Louisiana		Guyed Mast	
528.8 m	Pinnacle Towers Tower Addis	Addis, Louisiana		Guyed Mast	
527.6 m	Richland Towers Tower Cedar Hill	Cedar Hill, Texas		Guyed Mast	
527.3 m	Willis Tower	Chicago, Illinois	41°52′44″N 087°38′10″W		
525.8 m	WAFB Tower Baton Rouge	Baton Rouge, Louisiana		Guyed Mast	
522.5 m	Media Venture Tower	Fincher, Jefferson County, Florida		Guyed Mast	
522.5 m	Orlando Hearst Argyle Television Tower	Orange City, Florida		Guyed Mast	
522.4 m	Pinnacle Towers Tower Moody	Moody, Texas		Guyed Mast	
520.3 m	Clear Channel Broadcasting Tower Rosinton	Rosinton (Robertsdale), Baldwin County, Alabama		Guyed Mast	
520.2 m	Pacific and Southern Company Tower Lugoff	Lugoff, South Carolina		Guyed Mast	
519.7 m	Young Broadcasting Tower Garden City	Garden City, South Dakota		Guyed Mast	Collapsed from winter ice storm build-up at around 08:53 AM CST on December 14, 2022; planned to be restored (date TBD)
519.7 m	Gray Television Tower Carlos	Carlos, Grimes County, Texas		Guyed Mast	
516.7 m	South Dakota Public Broadcasting Network Tower	Faith, South Dakota		Guyed Mast	
516.3 m	Gray Television Tower Madill	Madill, Oklahoma		Guyed Mast	
516.6 m	Spectra Site Communications Tower Orange City	Orange City, Florida		Guyed Mast	
513.3 m	American Tower Christmas	Christmas, Florida		Guyed Mast	
512.7 m	Richland Towers Bithlo	Bithlo, Florida		Guyed Mast	
512.6 m	Northland Television Tower Rhinelander	Rhinelander, Wisconsin		Guyed Mast	
511.8 m	Gray Television Tower Moody	Moody, Texas		Guyed Mast	
511.1 m	KFVS TV Mast	Cape Girardeau County, Missouri		Guyed Mast	
508.1 m	Cox Radio Tower Verna	Verna, Florida		Guyed Mast	
508.1 m	WMTW TV Mast	Baldwin, Maine	43°50′44″N 070°45′41″W	Guyed Mast	
506.2 m	American Towers Tower Cedar Hill	Cedar Hill, Texas		Guyed Mast	
502 m	American Towers Tower Oklahoma City	Oklahoma City, Oklahoma		Guyed Mast	
500.5 m	University of North Carolina Tower	Columbia, North Carolina		Guyed Mast	
498.4 m	Richland Towers Tower Cedar Hill 2	Cedar Hill, Texas		Guyed Mast	
497 m	WWRR Renda Tower	Kingsland, Georgia		Guyed Mast	
496 m	QueenB Television Tower	La Crosse, Wisconsin		Guyed Mast	
496 m	KDEB Tower	Fordland, Missouri		Guyed Mast	
495 m	WGME TV Tower	Raymond, Maine		Guyed Mast	
495.9 m	WPSD-TV Tower	Kevil, Kentucky		Guyed Mast	
495.6 m	NVG-Amarillo Tower	Amarillo, Texas		Guyed Mast	
493.5 m	Sinclair Television Tower Oklahoma	Oklahoma City, Oklahoma		Guyed Mast	
491.6 m	WFTV TV Tower Christmas	Christmas, Florida		Guyed Mast	
491 m	WJJY TV Mast	Bluffs, Illinois		Guyed Mast	destroyed in 1978
491 m	Media General Tower Jackson	Jackson, Mississippi		Guyed Mast	
491 m	WHNS TV-Tower	Brevard, North Carolina		Guyed Mast	
490.7 m	KOBR-TV Tower	Caprock, New Mexico		Guyed Mast	
490.2 m	Joint Venture TV Tower Bithlo	Bithlo, Florida		Guyed Mast	
489.2 m	American Towers Tower Bithlo	Bithlo, Florida		Guyed Mast	
488 m	NYT Broadcast Holdings Tower Oklahoma	Oklahoma City, Oklahoma		Guyed Mast	
487.8 m	Clear Channel Broadcasting Tower Boykin	Boykin, Georgia		Guyed Mast	
487.7 m	WVFJ Tower Saint Marks	Saint Marks, Georgia		Guyed Mast	
486.4 m	Paramount Tower Oklahoma	Oklahoma City, Oklahoma		Guyed Mast	
485.5 m	WTVA TV Tower	Woodland, Mississippi		Guyed Mast	
483.7 m	KTVT Tower	Cedar Hill, Texas		Guyed Mast	
482.2 m	GBC LP DBA Tower	Cedar Hill, Texas		Guyed Mast	
481.3 m	WLFL Tower Apex	Apex, North Carolina		Guyed Mast	
481 m	WFAA Tower	Cedar Hill, Texas		Guyed Mast	
480.5 m	Griffin Television Tower Oklahoma	Oklahoma City, Oklahoma		Guyed Mast	
480 m	Viacom Tower Riverview	Riverview, Florida		Guyed Mast	
479.4 m	Tampa Tower General Partnership Tower Riverview	Riverview, Florida		Guyed Mast	
478 m	American Towers Tower Riverview-33569	Riverview, Florida		Guyed Mast	
477.6 m	KBSI TV Mast	Cape Girardeau, Missouri		Guyed Mast	
477.1 m	Media General Tower Saint Ansgar	Saint Ansgar, Iowa		Guyed Mast	
477 m	Red River Broadcast Tower Salem	Salem, South Dakota		Guyed Mast	Destroyed by a wind storm in 2022
476.4 m	Hearst-Argyle Television Tower	Oklahoma City, Oklahoma		Guyed Mast	
475.6 m	Augusta Tower	Jackson, South Carolina		Guyed Mast	
475.5 m	WAGT TV Tower	Beech Island, South Carolina		Guyed Mast	
475.1 m	KPLX Tower	Cedar Hill, Texas		Guyed Mast	
474.9 m	Mississippi Authority for Educational Television Tower	Raymond, Mississippi		Guyed Mast	
473.3m	KRRT TV Tower	Lakehills, Texas		Guyed Mast	
473.1 m	Hearst-Argyle Tower Watsonville	Watsonville, California		Guyed Mast	
473 m	Media General Tower Forest Hill	Forest Hill, Louisiana		Guyed Mast	
473 m	WVAH Tower	Scott Depot, West Virginia		Guyed Mast	destroyed in 2003
472.1 m	KXTV/KOVR/KCRA Tower	Walnut Grove, California		Guyed Mast	
472.1 m	SpectraSite Tower Holopaw	Holopaw, Florida		Guyed Mast	
472.7 m	American Towers Tower Cedar Hill 2	Cedar Hill, Texas		Guyed Mast	
469.4 m	Perkston Morris Tower	Inda, Stone County, Mississippi		Guyed Mast	
469.2 m	Capstar Radio Tower Mooresville	Mooresville, North Carolina		Guyed Mast	
469 m	Mississippi Authority for Educational TV Tower McHenry	McHenry, Mississippi		Guyed Mast	
468.7 m	Pacific and Southern Tower Holiday	Holiday, Florida		Guyed Mast	
468.4 m	KXAS TV Tower	Cedar Hill, Texas		Guyed Mast	
467.2 m	Malrite Communications Tower Green Acres	Greenacres, Florida		Guyed Mast	
468 m	KXTX TV Tower	Cedar Hill, Texas		Guyed Mast	
467.6 m	Richland Towers Tower Lonsdale	Lonsdale, Tennessee		Guyed Mast	
467 m	Lewis JR Tower 1	Bloomingdale, Georgia		Guyed Mast	
466.6 m	WTOC TV Tower	Savannah, Georgia		Guyed Mast	
466.5 m	Outlet Broadcasting Tower	Clayton, North Carolina		Guyed Mast	
466.3 m	Ime Media Tower	Mullins, South Carolina		Guyed Mast	
466.3 m	WFXB TV FOX 43 Tower	Mullins, South Carolina		Guyed Mast	
466.3 m	Texas Tall Tower Elmendorf 2	Elmendorf, Texas		Guyed Mast	
466 m	Outlet Communications Tower Clayton	Clayton, North Carolina		Guyed Mast	
465.1 m	WIS TV Tower	Lugoff, South Carolina		Guyed Mast	
465.1 m	Raycom America Tower Huntsville	Huntsville, Alabama	34°42′39.3″N 86°32′07.0″W	Guyed Mast	
464.5 m	Texas Tall Tower Elmendorf	Elmendorf, Texas		Guyed Mast	
464.4 m	Nebraska Education Tower Bassett	Bassett, Nebraska		Guyed Mast	
464 m	BREN Tower	Jackass Flats, Nevada	36°46′48″N 116°14′33″W	Guyed Mast	used for scientific experiments
463.5 m	Channel 34 TV Tower Palm City	Palm City, Florida		Guyed Mast	
463.4 m	WPBF Tower Martin County	Martin County, Florida		Guyed Mast	
463.3 m	WPBF Tower Martin County	Martin County, Florida		Guyed Mast	
463 m	Fort Myers Broadcasting Tower Punta Gorda	Punta Gorda, Florida		Guyed Mast	
463 m	Second Generation of Iowa Tower Van Horne	Van Horne, Iowa		Guyed Mast	
462.5 m	Telemundo Tower San Antonio	Elmendorf, Texas		Guyed Mast	
462.1 m	WBBH TV Tower Tuckers Corner	Tuckers Corner, Charlotte County, Florida		Guyed Mast	
462.1 m	Waterman Broadcasting Tower Punta Gorda	Punta Gorda, Florida		Guyed Mast	
461.8 m	American Towers Tower Punta Gorda	Punta Gorda, Florida		Guyed Mast	
461.3 m	Viacom Communications Tower Duette	Duette, Florida		Guyed Mast	
460 m	KPLC TV Tower Fenton	Fenton, Louisiana		Guyed Mast	
459.3 m	Post Newsweek Stations San Antonio Tower	Elmendorf, Texas		Guyed Mast	
459.3 m	Iowa Public TV Tower Hancock	Hancock, Iowa		Guyed Mast	
459 m	Gray TV Tower Beech Island	Beech Island, South Carolina		Guyed Mast	
458.7 m	KPXM Tower	Big Lake, Minnesota	45°23′00″N 093°42′31″W	Guyed Mast	
458.4 m	Gannett Pacific Tower Knoxville	Knoxville, Tennessee		Guyed Mast	
458.1 m	KABB Tower	Elmendorf, Texas		Guyed Mast	
458 m	VLF transmitter Lualualei	Lualualei, Hawaii	21°25′22″N 158°09′01″W	Guyed Mast	
457.8 m	Mercury Broadcasting Tower Cool Springs	Cool Springs Township, Iredell County, North Carolina		Guyed Mast	
457.5 m	KWCH 12 Tower	east of Hutchinson, Kansas	38°03′38″N 097°45′50″W	Guyed Mast	
457.5 m	Clear Channel Broadcasting Tower Elsanor	Elsanor, Alabama		Guyed Mast	
457.4 m	Capstar Radio Tower Alexis	Alexis, North Carolina		Guyed Mast	
457.2 m	John Hancock Center	Chicago, Illinois		Skyscraper	
457.2 m	KLST TV Tower	Eola, Texas		Guyed Mast	
457.2 m	Gray TV Tower Beaver Crossing	Beaver Crossing, Nebraska	40°48′11″N 97°10′52″W	Guyed Mast	
457 m	Cox Radio Tower Eustis	Eustis, Florida		Guyed Mast	
457 m	SpectraSite Tower Bandera	Bandera, Texas		Guyed Mast	
457 m	Kimtron Tower Loretto	Loretto, Alabama		Guyed Mast	
456.9 m	State of Wisconsin Tower Park Falls	Park Falls, Wisconsin		Guyed Mast	
456.9 m	American Towers Tower Amarillo 2	Amarillo, Texas		Guyed Mast	
456.9 m	Nebraska Education Tower Angora	Angora, Nebraska		Guyed Mast	collapsed in 1978
456 m	Panhandle Telecasting Tower Amarillo	Amarillo, Texas		Guyed Mast	
454.8 m	Pinnacle Towers Tower La Feria	La Feria, Texas		Guyed Mast	
454.5 m	Pinnacle Towers Tower Santa Maria	Santa Maria, Texas		Guyed Mast	
453.1 m	KQID TV Tower	Jena, Louisiana		Guyed Mast	
451 m	Lewis JR Tower 2	Bloomingdale, Georgia		Guyed Mast	
450.8 m	Media General Tower Bloomingdale	Bloomingdale, Georgia		Guyed Mast	
450.8 m	Saga Communications Tower Alleman	Alleman, Iowa		Guyed Mast	
450.5 m	Duhamel Broadcasting Tower Angora	Angora, Nebraska	41°50′27.7″N 103°4′28.8″W	Guyed Mast	
449 m	WOFL-TV35 Tower Bithlo	Bithlo, Florida		Guyed Mast	
449 m	Blue Ridge Tower Missouri City	Missouri City, Texas		Guyed Mast	Disassembled in 2010
448 m	Empire State Building	New York, New York	40°44′54″N 073°59′09″W	Skyscraper	
447 m	Pinnacle Towers Mount Selman	Mount Selman, Texas		Guyed Mast	
446.8 m	KMSP TV Tower	Shoreview, Minnesota		Guyed Mast	
446.7 m	Media General Operations Tower Youngstown	Mount Selman, Texas		Guyed Mast	
446.5 m	KLKN TV-Tower	Utica, Nebraska		Guyed Mast	
446 m	WCES TV Tower	Wrens, Georgia		Guyed Mast	
445.9 m	New World Communications Tower Riverview	Riverview, Florida		Guyed Mast	
446 m	WTVT Tower Balm	Balm, Florida		Guyed Mast	
445.2 m	WDAY TV-Tower	Dahlen, North Dakota		Guyed Mast	
444.5 m	KTEN TV-Tower Bromide	Bromide, Oklahoma		Guyed Mast	
444.5 m	WICS-TV Tower Mechanicsburg	Mechanicsburg, Illinois		Guyed Mast	
444.2 m	SpectraSite Tower Knoxville	Knoxville, Tennessee		Guyed Mast	
443.8 m	KM TV Tower	West Branch, Iowa		Guyed Mast	
441.7 m	Springfield Independent TV Tower	Mechanicsburg, Illinois		Guyed Mast	
441.7 m	Iowa Public TV Tower West Branch	West Branch, Iowa		Guyed Mast	
441.4 m	American Towers Tower Amarillo	Amarillo, Texas		Guyed Mast	
438.7 m	KTKA-TV Tower Topeka	Topeka, Kansas		Guyed Mast	
438.4 m	KTXR Tower	Fordland, Missouri		Guyed Mast	
438.3 m	Telefarm Towers Shoreview	Shoreview, Minnesota		Guyed Mast	
438.2 m	Red River Broadcast Tower Pembina	Pembina, North Dakota		Guyed Mast	
438 m	WNWO-TV 24 Tower	Jerusalem Township, Ohio	41°40′03″N 083°21′22″W	Guyed Mast	
437.7 m	Telefarm Towers Shoreview	Shoreview, Minnesota		Guyed Mast	
436.8 m	SpectraSite Tower Youngstown	Youngstown, Ohio		Guyed Mast	
431.9 m	Burlington TV Tower Aledo	Aledo, Illinois		Guyed Mast	
435.2 m	Christholm Trail Broadcasting Tower Crescent	Crescent, Oklahoma		Guyed Mast	
433.7 m	Madison Candelabra Tower	Madison, Wisconsin		Guyed Mast	
431.6 m	University of North Carolina Tower Concord	Concord, North Carolina		Guyed Mast	
431 m	Concord Media Tower Molino	Molino, Florida		Guyed Mast	
427.7 m	KXEL-Tower	Walker, Iowa		Guyed Mast	
424.6 m	SpectraSite Tower Charlotte	Charlotte, North Carolina		Guyed Mast	
424.3 m	Capstar Radio Tower Middlesex	Middlesex, North Carolina		Guyed Mast	
421 m	KWQC TV Tower	Bettendorf, Iowa		Guyed Mast	
419.1 m	KQQK Tower Hitchcock	Cedar Hill, Texas		Guyed Mast	
418.2 m	Citicasters Tower Holiday	Holiday, Florida		Guyed Mast	
417.4 m	WSMV TV-Tower	Nashville, Tennessee		Guyed Mast	
417 m	World Trade Center Tower One	New York, New York		Skyscraper	destroyed in 2001 by 9/11 attacks
417 m	KTFO TV-Tower Coweta	Coweta, Oklahoma		Guyed Mast	
417 m	Trinity Broadcasting Network Tower Oglesby	Oglesby, Illinois		Guyed Mast	
416.6 m	Ocala Broadcasting Tower	Ocala, Florida		Guyed Mast	
415.1 m	KETV TV Tower	Omaha, Nebraska	41°18′32″N 96°1′34.2″W	Guyed Mast	
415 m	World Trade Center Tower Two	New York, New York		Skyscraper	destroyed in 2001 by 9/11 attacks
414 m	Tallahassee Broadcasting Tower	Lloyd, Florida		Guyed Mast	
413.2 m	KGAN-Tower	Walker, Iowa	42°17′43.2″N 91°53′11.6″W	Guyed Mast	
411.8 m	ACME TV Tower	Oreana, Illinois		Guyed Mast	
411.8 m	Entercom Tower Morriston	Morriston, Florida		Guyed Mast	
411.5 m	Entravision Tower Boylston	Boylston, Massachusetts		Guyed Mast	
411.5 m	LORAN-C transmitter Port Clarence	Port Clarence, Alaska	65°14′40″N 166°53′12″W	Guyed Mast	
411.2 m	American Tower Newton	Newton, Massachusetts		Guyed Mast	
411.2 m	WCML Television Tower Atlanta	Atlanta, Michigan		Guyed Mast	
410.6 m	WKRR/WKZL Tower	Randleman, North Carolina		Guyed Mast	
410.6 m	Huntsville TV Tower	Minor Hill, Tennessee		Guyed Mast	
410.2 m	Emmis TV Tower Omaha	Omaha, Nebraska		Guyed Mast	
408 m	WTIC Tower	Farmington, Connecticut	41°42′13″N 072°49′55″W	Guyed Mast	
407.8 m	WICD Tower	Homer, Illinois		Guyed Mast	
407.8 m	Tall Towers Tower La Feria	La Feria, Texas		Guyed Mast	
407.3 m	Spectrasite Communications Tower Frenchburg	Frenchburg, Kentucky		Guyed Mast	
405.7 m	Scripps Howard Broadcasting Tower Greenacres City	Greenacres, Florida		Guyed Mast	
405 m	KLPA Television Tower	Alexandria, Louisiana		Guyed Mast	
404.8 m	Cumulus Broadcasting Tower Rockvale	Rockvale, Tennessee		Guyed Mast	
404.1 m	South Dakota Public Broadcasting Tower Reliance	Reliance, South Dakota		Guyed Mast	
403.6 m	Clear Channel Broadcasting Tower Jernigan Town	Jernigan Town, Robertson County, Tennessee		Guyed Mast	
403.2 m	WEYI Tower	Clio, Michigan	43°13′1″N 83°43′17″W	Guyed Mast	
402.4 m	Cossitt Library Dba Tower	Frenchmans Bayou, Arkansas		Guyed Mast	
402.1 m	WLOX TV Tower	Perkinston, Mississippi		Guyed Mast	
402 m	Southwest TV Tower Lunita	Lunita, Calcasieu Parish, Louisiana		Guyed Mast	
402 m	Mississippi Authority for Educational TV Tower Oxford	Oxford, Mississippi		Guyed Mast	
401.7 m	South Carolina Educational TV Tower	Green Pond, South Carolina		Guyed Mast	
401.6 m	WJWJ TV Tower	Beaufort, South Carolina		Guyed Mast	
400.9 m	Lewis Broadcasting Tower Columbus	Columbus, Georgia		Guyed Mast	
400.5 m	KTTC-TV Tower	Ostrander, Minnesota		Guyed Mast	
400.5 m	Wand TV Tower	Argenta, Illinois		Guyed Mast	
399.1 m	South Dakota TV Tower	Crocker, South Dakota		Guyed Mast	
398.4 m	University of North Carolina Tower Chapel Hill	Chapel Hill, North Carolina		Guyed Mast	
397.8 m	Sinclair Radio Tower	Hillsboro, Missouri		Guyed Mast	
397.7 m	Pacific and Southern Company Tower East Sebago	East Sebago, Maine		Guyed Mast	
396.3 m	Midwest Tower Dolan Springs	Dolan Springs, Arizona		Guyed Mast	
396.3 m	MMM Tower Minden	Minden, Nebraska		Guyed Mast	
395.9 m	KXAN TV Tower (Old)	Austin, Texas		Guyed Mast	dismantled
395.9 m	KXAN TV Tower	Austin, Texas		Guyed Mast	
395.9 m	ACME TV Tower Madison	Madison, Wisconsin		Guyed Mast	
395.3 m	Clear Channel Broadcasting Tower Owasso	Owasso, Oklahoma		Guyed Mast	
395 m	WGBH/WBZ/WCVB Cluster	Needham, Massachusetts	42°18′37″N 071°14′12″W	Guyed Mast	
393.3 m	Heritage Broadcasting Tower	Tustin, Michigan		Guyed Mast	
393 m	Entercom Greensboro Tower	Greensboro, North Carolina		Guyed Mast	
392.9 m	KEYE TV Tower	Austin, Texas		Guyed Mast	
392.9 m	Richland Towers Tower Nashville	Nashville, Tennessee		Guyed Mast	
391.4 m	ERF TV Tower	Dry Prong, Louisiana		Guyed Mast	
391 m	Appleton Tower	Appleton, Minnesota		Guyed Mast	
390.8 m	Clear Channel Broadcasting Tower Caesars Head	Caesars Head, South Carolina		Guyed Mast	
390.1 m	Forestport Tower	Forestport, New York		Guyed Mast	(demolished on April 21, 1998, by explosives)
390 m	WBFF Tower	Baltimore, Maryland	39°20′10″N 076°38′58″W	Guyed Mast	
389 m	WPVI-DT/KYW-DT	Philadelphia, Pennsylvania	40°02′33″N 075°14′32″W	Guyed Mast	
386.8 m	KVUE TV Tower	Austin, Texas		Guyed Mast	
386.5 m	KLKE TV Tower	Elgin, Nebraska		Guyed Mast	
386.5 m	Clear Channel Broadcasting Tower Broken Arrow	Broken Arrow, Oklahoma		Guyed Mast	
386 m	Clear Channel Broadcasting Tower Little Rock	Little Rock, Arkansas		Guyed Mast	
383.7 m	KTBC TV Tower	Austin, Texas		Guyed Mast	
383.3 m	Sinclair Media Tower Robertsdale	Robertsdale, Alabama		Guyed Mast	
383.1 m	Superior OK Tower	Oklahoma City, Oklahoma		Guyed Mast	
383.1 m	American Towers Tower Philadelphia	Philadelphia, Pennsylvania		Guyed Mast	
382.8 m	KEYI Radio Tower	Alvord, Texas		Guyed Mast	
382.7 m	WGHP TV 8 Tower	Sophia, North Carolina		Guyed Mast	
382.5 m	American Towers Tower Suffolk	Suffolk, Virginia		Guyed Mast	
382.2 m	Barnacle Broadcasting Tower Port Royale	Port Royal, South Carolina		Guyed Mast	
382 m	Journal Broadcast Tower Arkansas City	Arkansas City, Kansas		Guyed Mast	
381.9 m	WTOL-TV 11 Broadcasting Tower	Oregon, Ohio		Guyed Mast	
381.9 m	American Towers Tower Newton	Newton, Massachusetts		Guyed Mast	
381.6 m	CBS Tower Escanaba	Escanaba, Michigan		Guyed Mast	
381.6 m	Univision Television Tower	Marlborough, Massachusetts		Guyed Mast	
381.4 m	American Towers Tower Whites Creek	Whites Creek, Tennessee		Guyed Mast	
381 m	WTVZ Tower	Suffolk, Virginia		Guyed Mast	
380.8 m	WUXP TV Tower	Nashville, Tennessee		Guyed Mast	
380.7 m	Silver King Broadcasting Tower Hudson	Hudson, Massachusetts		Guyed Mast	
380.7 m	Gray TV Tower Maple Hill	Maple Hill, Kansas		Guyed Mast	
380 m	Charlotte Mecklenburg Public Broadcasting Authority	Charlotte, North Carolina		Guyed Mast	
379.2 m	RGV Tower	La Feria, Texas		Guyed Mast	
378 m	Hill Tower Cedar Hill	Cedar Hill, Texas		Guyed Mast	
378 m	Nextel South Tower Pendergrass	Pendergrass, Georgia		Guyed Mast	
378 m	Pinnacle Towers Tower Pendergrass	Pendergrass, Georgia		Guyed Mast	
377.3 m	Nebraska Educational Telecommunication Tower Giltner	Giltner, Nebraska		Guyed Mast	
375.8 m	WRLH TV Tower	Midlothian, Virginia		Guyed Mast	
375.5 m	Brill Media Tower	McGirk, Missouri		Guyed Mast	
374.9 m	WSET Tower	Thaxton, Virginia		Guyed Mast	
374.6 m	Clear Channel Broadcasting Tower Buda	Buda, Texas		Guyed Mast	
374.5 m	American Towers Tower Austin	Austin, Texas		Guyed Mast	
374 m	Nexstar Tower Vidor	Vidor, Texas		Guyed Mast	
374 m	KNVA TV Tower	Austin, Texas		Guyed Mast	
373.4 m	WVEC TV Tower	Suffolk, Virginia		Guyed Mast	
373.1 m	KATC Tower	Kaplan, Louisiana		Guyed Mast	
373 m	Super Tower Estero	Estero, Florida		Guyed Mast	
372.8 m	WABV TV Tower	Pelham, Georgia		Guyed Mast	
372.8 m	Citadel Broadcasting Tower Brentwood	Brentwood, Tennessee		Guyed Mast	
372.8 m	SpectraSite Tower Louisburg	Louisburg, North Carolina		Guyed Mast	
372.5 m	Pinnacle Tower	Richmond, Virginia		Guyed Mast	
372.2 m	MATC Guyed Mast	Milwaukee, Wisconsin		Guyed Mast	
372 m	KCPT TV Tower	Kansas City, Missouri		Guyed Mast	
371 m	Chimney of Homer City Generating Station	Minersville, Pennsylvania		Chimney	
370 m	Kennecott Garfield Smelter Stack	Tooele, Utah	40°43′18″N 112°11′52″W	(Chimney)	
370.2 m	WCCB-TV/FOX Tower	Charlotte, North Carolina		Guyed Mast	
369.7 m	Milwaukee Area Technical College District Board Tower	Milwaukee, Wisconsin		Guyed Mast	
370 m	Kennecott Garfield Smelter Stack	Garfield, Utah	40°43′18″N 112°11′52″W	Smokestack	
368.5 m	Pinnacle Towers Tower Church Point	Church Point, Louisiana		Guyed Mast	
368.5 m	WTVY Radio Tower	Webb, Alabama		Guyed Mast	
367.8 m	SpectraSite Tower Conroe	Conroe, Texas		Guyed Mast	
367.6 m	Chimney of Mitchell Power Plant	Moundsville, West Virginia		Chimney	
367.4 m	WDAY TV Tower	Amenia, North Dakota		Guyed Mast	
367 m	Reiten TV tower	Saint Anthony, North Dakota		Guyed Mast	
367 m	Renda Tower Espanola	Espanola, Florida		Guyed Mast	
366.7 m	KXEO Radio Tower Missouri	Audrain County, Missouri		Guyed Mast	
366.4 m	Spectrasite Communications Tower Montville	Montville, Connecticut		Guyed Mast	
366 m	CBS TV Mast	Needham, Massachusetts		Guyed Mast	
366 m	Omnicom Tower Sharon	Sharon, Oklahoma		Guyed Mast	
366 m	UHF Candelabra	Needham, Massachusetts		Guyed Mast	
365.9 m	Grace University Tower Springfield	Springfield, Nebraska		Guyed Mast	
365.8 m	NSS Annapolis, central mast	Annapolis, Maryland		Guyed Mast	demolished
365.8 m	State of Wisconsin Tower Colfax	Colfax, Wisconsin		Guyed Mast	
365.8 m	Ottumwa Media Tower Richland	Richland, Iowa		Guyed Mast	
365.8 m	Iowa Public Television Tower	Bradgate, Iowa		Guyed Mast	
365.8 m	Triathlon Broadcasting Tower	Oakland, Iowa		Guyed Mast	
365.8 m	Clear Channel Broadcasting Tower Newnan	Newnan, Georgia		Guyed Mast	
365.5 m	Channel 48 Tower	Friendswood, Texas		Guyed Mast	
365.5 m	WCPE Radio Tower	Wake Forest, North Carolina		Guyed Mast	
365.4 m	Clear Channel Broadcasting Tower Brunswick	Brunswick, Tennessee		Guyed Mast	
365.3 m	OMEGA Transmitter La Moure	LaMoure, North Dakota		Guyed Mast	
365 m	Pinnacle Towers New London	New London, Texas		Guyed Mast	
364.7 m	WRJA-TV-FM Tower	Sumter, South Carolina		Guyed Mast	
365 m	Lin Television Tower Austin	Austin, Texas		Guyed Mast	
363.9 m	WIAT-TV Tower	Birmingham, Alabama		Guyed Mast	
363.3 m	South Carolina Educational TV tower Sumter	Sumter, South Carolina		Guyed Mast	
363.3 m	KSAX-TV Tower	Westport, Minnesota		Guyed Mast	
362.7 m	KCDO-TV Tower	Morgan County, Colorado		Guyed Mast	
362.4 m	Midwest Tower Partners Tower Neese	Neese, Georgia		Guyed Mast	
361.2 m	KVUE TV Tower	Austin, Texas		Guyed Mast	
361.1 m	MMM Tower Eagle	Eagle, Nebraska		Guyed Mast	
361 m	FTS Philadelphia	Philadelphia, Pennsylvania		Guyed Mast	
360.9 m	World Radio Tower Santa Maria	Santa Maria, Texas		Guyed Mast	
360.3 m	Richland Towers Tower Atlanta	Atlanta, Georgia		Guyed Mast	
360 m	Trinity Broadcasting Tower Oklahoma	Oklahoma City, Oklahoma		Guyed Mast	
359.1 m	Prairie Public Broadcasting Tower	Amenia, North Dakota		Guyed Mast	
358.7 m	Cox Radio Tower Security	Security, Texas		Guyed Mast	
358.7 m	Paxson Syracuse Tower West Monroe	West Monroe, New York		Guyed Mast	
358.4 m	Scripps Howard Broadcasting Tower Sand Springs	Sand Springs, Oklahoma		Guyed Mast	
357.8 m	Briarcliff Property Tenants	Atlanta, Georgia		Guyed Mast	
357.5 m	Pappas Telecasting Tower Lowell	Lowell, Nebraska		Guyed Mast	
357.5 m	NYT Tower Figure Five	Figure Five, Arkansas		Guyed Mast	
357.2 m	Western New York Public Broadcasting Tower	Grand Island, New York		Guyed Mast	
356.7 m	Greater Dayton Public TV Tower	Dayton, Ohio		Guyed Mast	
356.3 m	American Towers Tower Colwich	Colwich, Kansas		Guyed Mast	
356.1 m	Montgomery Tower	Montgomery, Alabama		Guyed Mast	
356 m	University of North Carolina Tower Farmville	Farmville, North Carolina		Guyed Mast	
356 m	KSMO Candelabra Tower	Independence, Missouri		Guyed Mast	
355 m	WDAF Tower	Kansas City, Missouri		Guyed Mast	
355 m	University of North Carolina Tower Brinkleyville	Brinkleyville, North Carolina			
354.8 m	KPXE Tower	Kansas City, Missouri		Guyed Mast	
354.8 m	KTMD-TV Tower	Friendswood, Texas		Guyed Mast	
354.8 m	KSHB/KMCI Tower	Kansas City, Missouri		Guyed Mast	
354.2 m	Clear Channel Broadcasting Tower Colwich	Colwich, Kansas		Guyed Mast	
353.9 m	KDEN TV Tower	Frederick, Colorado		Guyed Mast	
353.3 m	SpectraSite Communications tower Glenmore	Glenmore, Wisconsin		Guyed Mast	
353 m	Emmis TV Tower Ledgeview Township	Ledgeview, Wisconsin		Guyed Mast	
353 m	KPXE Tower	Kansas City, Missouri		Guyed Mast	
352.9 m	WWSG-TV	Philadelphia, Pennsylvania		Guyed Mast	
352.9 m	American Towers Tower Philadelphia	Philadelphia, Pennsylvania		Guyed Mast	
352.1 m	KDNL TV Tower 2	Shrewsbury, Missouri		Guyed Mast	
352 m	Cox Radio Tower Newnan	Newnan, Georgia		Guyed Mast	
352 m	Southeastern Media Tower Beech Island	Beech Island, South Carolina		Guyed Mast	
351.7 m	Cowskin Broadcasting Tower Colwich	Colwich, Kansas		Guyed Mast	
351.7 m	American Towers Tower Dayton	Dayton, Ohio		Guyed Mast	
351.4 m	Young Broadcasting Tower Knoxville	Knoxville, Tennessee		Guyed Mast	
351.4 m	Omaha Great Empire Broadcasting Tower	Omaha, Nebraska		Guyed Mast	
350.2 m	Stratosphere Tower	Las Vegas, Nevada		Tower	
350.2 m	KSDK Tower	Shrewsbury, Missouri		Guyed Mast	
350.2 m	Saga Communications Tower Mitchellville	Mitchellville, Iowa		Guyed Mast	
350.2 m	Raycom National Tower	Parma, Ohio		Guyed Mast	
350.2 m	WBAY TV tower	Ledgeview, Wisconsin		Guyed Mast	
350 m	Emmis TV tower Topeka	Topeka, Kansas		Guyed Mast	
350 m	Trinity Broadcasting Tower Conyers	Conyers, Georgia		Guyed Mast	
350 m	KTTC-TV Tower	Grand Meadow, Minnesota		Guyed Mast	
350 m	Corridor TV Tower	Albert, Texas		Guyed Mast	

== See also ==
- List of tallest structures in the United States, state-by-state listing
- Geostationary balloon satellite
