= List of tallest structures in the United States =

The height of structures in the United States has been poorly documented. However, the data is a matter of public record, appearing in documents maintained by the Federal Aviation Administration (FAA) and Federal Communications Commission (FCC).

This list is populated heavily by antenna masts. The engineering aspects of super-tall masts are highly specialized. Only four companies erect the majority of such structures: Doty Moore Tower Services (Cedar Hill, Texas); Kline Towers (Columbia, South Carolina); LeBlanc Royal Telecom (Oakville, Ontario); and Stainless Inc. (North Wales, Pennsylvania). The design and construction are largely governed by RS222E Electronic Industries Alliance standards. A 1,000-foot (300 m) tall mast costs between $0.7 and $1.1 million to build, while a 2,000-foot (610 m) tall mast costs $2.4 to $4 million. Prices generally vary depending on tower capacity and wind loading specifications.

A common misperception is that landmarks such as the Stratosphere Tower are the tallest United States structures, but they are in fact the tallest buildings. Likewise, Taipei 101 was often misrepresented as the world's tallest structure (although it was the tallest occupied building, before the certification of Dubai's Burj Khalifa as such), but in fact is far eclipsed by antenna towers in over a dozen states in the United States and in other countries.

In the United States, the FAA and the FCC must approve all towers exceeding 200 feet (61 m) in height. Furthermore, it is very difficult to get permission for structures over 2,000 feet (610 m) tall. The FCC presumes them to be inconsistent with the public interest, while the FAA presumes them to be a hazard to air navigation, resulting in poor airspace usage. A significant burden of proof is placed on the applicant to show that such a structure is in the public's best interests. Only when both agencies have resolved all legal, safety, and management concerns is such an application approved.

Since 1978, the United States has maintained 11 tethered aerostats sites along the southern borders. These balloons rise to 18,000 feet (5,500 m), carrying radar units for drug interdiction purposes. However, since the balloons are aided by buoyancy and are not permanent, they are not considered true structures.

== State-by-state listing ==
=== Alabama ===
- WTTO Television Tower (Birmingham WB-21)
  - Windham Springs (33°28′51″N 087°24′03″W)
  - Year built: 1986
  - At 2,000 ft (610 m), this structure ties 19 others around the United States as the seventh-tallest structure in the world
  - WTTO no longer transmits from this tower, having moved to the American Tower Candelabra in Birmingham as part of the television repack in 2020.
- RSA Battle House Tower
  - Height: 745 ft (227 m)
  - Mobile, Alabama
  - Tallest freestanding building in Alabama
  - It has a fiberglass spire on the top of the building that supports the antenna
  - The building has a crown inside it which is visible up to 30 mi (48 km) away
  - 35 floors

=== Alaska ===
- LORAN-C transmitter Port Clarence
  - Height: 1,350 ft (411 m)
  - Port Clarence (65°14′40″N 166°53′12″W)
  - Year built: 1961
  - Owner: U.S. Coast Guard
  - Demolished on April 28, 2010
- Knik TV Mast
  - Height: 808 ft (246 m)
  - Knik (61°25′20″N 149°52′28″W)
  - Year built: 1986
  - Owner: Alaska Public Telecommunications Inc

=== Arizona ===
- Midwest Tower Dolan Springs
  - Height: 1,299 ft (396.3 m)
  - Dolan Springs
  - Year built: 2000
- Chimney of Hayden Smelter
  - Height: 1,001 ft (305 m)
- Flue gas stacks of the Navajo Generating Station
  - Height: 775 ft (236 m)
  - Page (36°54′12″N 111°23′25″W)
  - Year built: 1996–1998
  - Owner: U.S. Bureau of Reclamation (24.3%), SRP (21.7%), Los Angeles Dept. of Water and Power (21.2%), Arizona Public Service Co. (14.0%), NV Energy (11.3%), Tucson Electric Power (7.5%)
  - The Navajo Generating Station, a coal-fired power plant located 4 mi (6.4 km) east of Page, has three 775 ft (236 m) lined, reinforced concrete stacks. The plant's original stacks were demolished in the late 1990s after being replaced by larger diameter stacks of the same height. The new stacks were required to accommodate cooler, saturated flue gas that resulted when wet SO2 scrubbers were added
- The tallest radio tower is the 650 ft (198 m) KSZR (97.5) tower in Oro Valley near Tucson

=== Arkansas ===
- KTVE Television Tower (El Dorado NBC 10)
  - Height: 1970 ft (600.4 m)
  - Bolding (33°04′41″N 092°13′41″W)
  - Year built: 1987
  - Owner: Grapevine Communications

=== California ===
- KXTV/KOVR Television Tower
  - Height: 2,049 ft (624.5 m)
  - Walnut Grove (38°14′23.2″N 121°30′05.7″W)
  - Year built: 2000
  - Owner: Gannett/CBS
  - This is the sixth-tallest structure in the world, just behind KVLY-TV mast and KRDK-TV mast in North Dakota. KXTV (ABC News 10) and KOVR (CBS 13), serve the Sacramento – Stockton – Modesto market. The tower has been used for research ozone sampling at different heights
  - In the same area, there are the 2,000 ft (609.6 m) tall Hearst-Argyle Tower (38°15′52.1″N 121°29′25.5″W) and the 1,994 ft (607.8 m) tall Channel 40 Tower (38°16′21.4″N 121°30′21.6″W)

=== Colorado ===
- Radio communications tower: KSRC, KFCO
  - Height: 1,996 ft (608 m)
  - Hoyt (39°55′22″N 103°58′18″W)
  - Year built: 2003
  - Owner: American Tower
  - Tower primarily used for penetration into the Denver radio market

=== Connecticut ===
- WTIC Television Tower (Hartford Fox 61)
  - Height: 1,339 ft (408 m)
  - Farmington (41°42′13″N 072°49′55″W)
  - Year built: 1984
  - Owner: Communications Site Management LLC

=== Delaware ===
- WBOC Television Tower (Salisbury CBS 16)
  - Height: 1,000 ft (305 m)
  - Laurel, Delaware (38°30′17″N 075°38′36″W)
  - Year built: 2000
  - Owner: WBOC

=== District of Columbia ===
- Hughes Memorial Tower
  - Height: 765 ft (232 m)
  - Washington (38°57′44″N 077°01′35″W)
  - Year built: 1989
  - Owner: District of Columbia Office of Property Management
  - Operator: Washington, D.C. Police Department
- WTTG Television Tower
  - Height: 705 ft (215 m)
  - Washington (38°57′22″N 077°04′58″W)
  - Year built: 1963
  - Owner: WTTG Fox
- Washington Monument
  - Height: ~ 555 ft (~169 m)
  - Washington (38°53′22″N 077°02′06″W)
  - Year built: 1884
  - Operator: National Park Service

=== Florida ===
- WTVY-TV Tower (Dothan, Alabama market)
  - Height: 1,901 ft (579 m) 2,049 ft ASL
  - Bethlehem (30°55′12″N 085°44′30″W)
  - Year built: 1978
  - Owner: Gray Television
- WCIX TV Tower
  - Homestead
  - Height: 1,801 ft (549 m)
  - Destroyed in 1992
  - Rebuilt

=== Georgia ===
- WCTV Television Tower (Tallahassee CBS 6)
  - Height: 2,000 ft (609 m)
  - Metcalf (30°40′14″N 083°56′26″W)
  - Year built: 1987
  - Owner: Gray Midamerica TV

=== Hawaii ===
- Navy VLF Antenna
  - Height: 1,503 ft (458 m)
  - Lualualei (21°25′22″N 158°09′01″W)
  - Year built: 1972
  - Owner: U.S. Navy / ROICC Pearl Harbor
  - The record is held by two towers, exactly identical, that reach 1,503 ft (458 m) tall. They are used to communicate with submarines throughout the Pacific basin. The second-tallest structure is the KHON-TV (Honolulu Fox 2) tower at 500 ft (152 m) located at 21°17′28″N 157°50′08″W

=== Idaho ===
- KMVT
  - Height: 682 ft (208 m)
  - Jerome (42°43′47″N 114°24′55″W)
  - Year built: 1961
  - Owner: KMVT Broadcasting

=== Illinois ===
- Willis Tower
  - Height: 1,730 ft (527 m)
  - Chicago (41°52′44″N 087°38′10″W)
  - Year built: 1974
  - Owner: TrizecHahn Office Properties

=== Indiana ===
- WTTV Television Tower (Bloomington WB 4)
  - Height: 1,132 ft (345 m)
  - Trafalgar (39°24′27″N 086°08′52″W)
  - Year built: 1957
  - Owner: Tribune
- WTVW Television Tower (Evansville Fox 7)
  - Height: 905 ft (276 m)
  - Chandler (38°1′26.9″N 87°21′44.3″W)
  - Year Built: 1956
  - Owner: Nexstar Broadcasting, Inc.

=== Iowa ===
- WOI Television Tower (Des Moines ABC 5)
  - Height: 2,000 ft (609.6 m)
  - Alleman (41°48′33″N 093°36′54″W)
  - Year built: 1972
  - Owner: NYT Broadcast Holdings LLC
- Des Moines Hearst-Argyle Television Tower Alleman
  - Height: 2,000 ft (609.6 m)
  - Alleman (41°48'35.0" N, 93°37'17.0" W)
  - Year built: 1974
- KCAU TV Tower
  - Height: 2,000 ft (609.6 m)
  - Sioux City (42°35'11.0" N, 96°13'57.0" W)
  - Year built: 1965
- AFLAC Tower
  - Height: 2,000 ft (609.4 m)
  - Rowley (42°24'02.0" N, 91°50'37.0" W )
  - Year built: 1984
- American Towers Tower Elkhart
  - Height: 2,000 ft (609.3 m)
  - Elkhart (41°49'48.0" N, 93°36'54.6" W)
  - Year built: 2001

=== Kansas ===
- KWCH 12 Tower (Wichita CBS 12)
  - Height: 1,501 ft (458 m)
  - Burrton (38°03′38″N 097°45′50″W)
  - Year built: 1963
  - Owner: Gray Television
  - This was KTVH-TV until 1983, when it became KWCH-TV. Signal also broadcast on DT on Ch 19

=== Kentucky ===
- WAVE Television Tower (Louisville NBC 3) – no longer used
  - Height: 1,739 ft (530 m)
  - La Grange (38°27′23″N 085°25′28″W)
  - Year built: 1990
  - Owner: Subcarrier Communications
  - This tower was built to allow WAVE to reach into parts of the Cincinnati, Ohio, market, which sacrificed the western part of the Louisville DMA. They abandoned a tower in Floyds Knobs, Indiana, when the La Grange tower went on the air. They have since put their HD antenna and transmitter at the Indiana site and abandoned the La Grange tower

=== Louisiana ===
- KNOE-TV, KMLU, and KLTM-TV shared tower
  - Height: 1,984 ft (604.7m)
  - Columbia (32°11′51″N 092°4′14″W)
  - Year built: 1998
  - Owner: American Tower Corporation
  - Now current tallest tower after the WZRH/KVDU tower collapsed
- WZRH/KVDU Radio Tower (New Orleans 92.3/104.1 FM)
  - Height: 2,000 ft (610 m)
  - Vacherie (29°57′11″N 090°43′26″W)
  - Year built: 1986
  - Owners: Cumulus and iHeartMedia; Cumulus is managing partner
  - Tower collapsed in late August, 2021 during Hurricane Ida

=== Maine ===
- WMTW Television Tower (Portland ABC 8)
  - Height: 1,667 ft (508 m)
  - Baldwin (43°50′44″N 070°45′41″W)
  - Year built: 2001
  - Owner: Hearst Stations Inc.
  - This tower was built in 2001 to replace WMTW's transmitting facility atop Mount Washington (New Hampshire). It began transmitting on February 5, 2002. The second-tallest structure is the WGME (CBS-13) tower in Raymond, which measures 1,624 ft (495 m) tall

=== Maryland ===
- WBFF Television Tower (Baltimore Fox 45)
  - Height: 1,280 ft (390 m)
  - Baltimore (39°20′10″N 076°38′58″W)
  - Year built: 1987
  - Owner: Cunningham Communications/Sinclair
  - Second-tallest is WMDT-TV ABC/47 (Salisbury) at 1,027 ft (313 m), near Sharptown

=== Massachusetts ===
- WUNI-TV Tower (Worcester/Boston Univision)
  - Height: 1,350 ft (411.5m)
  - Boylston (42°20′9″N 071°42′55″W)
  - Year built: 1969
  - Owner: Entravision Communications Corporation
- WGBH/WBZ/WCVB Cluster (Boston PBS/CBS/ABC)
  - Height: 1,296 ft (395 m)
  - Needham (42°18′37″N 071°14′12″W)
  - Year built: 1957
  - Owner: American Tower Corporation

=== Michigan ===
- WEYI-TV Tower
  - Height: 1,132 ft (403.2 m)
  - Clio (43°13′1″N 083°43′17″W)
  - Year built: 1972
  - Owner: Barrington Broadcasting
  - FCC ASRN: 1010544
- WCML Television Tower Atlanta (Alpena PBS 6)
  - Height: 1,349.11 ft (411.21 m)
  - Atlanta 45°00′17″N 84°08′38″W
  - Year built: 1972. Replaced with a newer, but shorter tower in 2010
  - Owner: Central Michigan University
  - FCC ASRN: 1002163 (Old tower), 1274349 (New tower)
  - Due to the replacement, this tower is no longer the tallest in Michigan

=== Minnesota ===
- KPXM Television Tower (Minneapolis ION 41)
  - Height: 1,505 ft (459 m)
  - Big Lake (45°23′00″N 093°42′31″W)
  - Year built: 1997 (Tower actually constructed in 1982 by the now defunct L.E.O. Broadcasting of St. Cloud Minnesota)
  - Owner: Paxson Minneapolis / KXLI
  - This station is licensed to St. Cloud; attempts to cover both that city and Minneapolis/St. Paul from a site between the two cities; and used to be known as KXLI-TV

=== Mississippi ===
- WLBT Television Tower (Jackson NBC 3)
  - Height: 1,998 ft (609 m)
  - Raymond (32°12′50″N 090°22′57″W)
  - Year built: 1999
  - Owner: Raycom Media

=== Missouri ===
- Rohn Tower/KMOS Tower
  - Height: 2,000 ft (609.6 m)
  - Syracuse
  - Year built: 2001
  - Owner: University of Central Missouri
- KY3 Tower 1
  - Height: 2,000 ft (609.4 m)
  - Fordland (37°10′26″N 92°56′28″W)
  - Year built: 2000
  - Owner: KYTV
- KY3 Tower 2
  - Height: 1,996 ft (608.4 m)
  - Marshfield
  - Year built: 1973
  - Owner: KYTV
- KOZK Television Tower (Springfield PBS 21)
  - Height: 1,960 ft (597.4 m)
  - Fordland (37°10′11″N 092°56′31″W)
  - Year built: 1971
  - Collapsed in 2018 during tower modifications for the FCC spectrum repack. Was not rebuilt
  - Owner: Missouri State University (Former SW Missouri State University)

=== Montana ===
- KTGF Television Tower (Great Falls NBC 16)
  - Height: 801 ft (244 m)
  - Great Falls (47°36′26″N 111°21′30″W)
  - Year built: 1986
  - Owner: Max Media of Montana

=== Nebraska ===
- KLKN Television Tower (Lincoln ABC 8)
  - Height: 1,854 ft (565 m)
  - Genoa (41°32′28″N 097°40′46″W)
  - Year built: 1969
  - Owner: Citadel Communications
  - The KDUH-TV tower at 1,965 ft (599 m) tall at Hemingford collapsed in early 2003 during reinforcement work. The Duhamel Broadcasting Tower Angora was constructed about 30 mi (48 km) away and was completed in September 2003. The replacement tower is 160 m (about 500 ft) shorter than the original. KXVO and KPTM in Omaha (which are co-owned) have an FCC construction permit to build a taller tower that would put their antennas 577 m (roughly 1,900 ft) up. There was also a 2,000 ft (610 m) tall mast at Hemingford, which collapsed in 2002

=== Nevada ===
- Shamrock Tower
  - Height: 1,464 ft (446.2 m)
  - Jessup, Nevada (39°54′46″N 118°55′18″W)
  - Year built: 2012
  - Owner: Shamrock Communications Scranton, Pennsylvania
  - The BREN Tower, located in Jackass Flats (Area 25) of the Nevada Test Site, was a mast that was built for nuclear radiation testing. The 465 m (1,526 ft) tall, 345-ton structure was constructed by Columbus, Ohio-based Dresser-Ideco in 1962. It was originally erected in Yucca Flat (Area 4) before being dismantled in 1966 and moved to Area 25. The mast was owned by the Department of Energy and maintained by National Security Technologies. On May 23, 2012, the BREN Tower was demolished. The tallest structure in Nevada since mid-2012 is the Shamrock Tower in Jessup, Nevada at 446.2 m (1,464 ft) tall, erected in mid-2012. The second-tallest structure in Nevada is the Moapa Entravision Tower at Moapa, a 426.7 m (1,400 ft) tall guyed TV mast at Moapa erected in 2008, the third-tallest is the 401 m (1,316 ft) tall Moapa Kemp Tower at Moapa, the fourth-tallest is Stratosphere Tower near downtown Las Vegas, which was erected in 1994–96 and reaches 1,149 ft (350 m) and 921 ft (281 m) without the mast. It is also the second-tallest freestanding structure in the western U.S. after the Kennecott Smokestack in Utah

=== New Hampshire ===
- WRLP Tower
  - Height: 663 ft (202 m)
  - Winchester (42°45′35″N 072°25′59″W)
  - Year built: 1966
  - Owner: Gunn Mountain Communications
  - Was used for WRLP-32. Now only used by two-way radio communication services

=== New Jersey ===
- WWSI Television Tower (Philadelphia Telemundo 62)
  - Height: 1,000 ft (305 m)
  - Tuckerton (39°37′53″N 074°21′10″W)
  - Year built: 2000
  - Owner: Telemundo Mid-Atlantic LLC

=== New Mexico ===
- KBIM Television Tower (Roswell CBS 10)
  - Height: 1,837 ft (560 m)
  - Roswell (33°03′20″N 103°49′14″W)
  - Year built: 1965
  - Owner: Nexstar Media, Inc.

=== New York ===
- Tallest structure in New York was the north tower of the World Trade Center from 1973 to 2001, with an overall height including the antenna mast of 1,727 ft (526.3 m). The original World Trade Center towers were destroyed in the September 11, 2001 terrorist attacks, temporarily making the Empire State Building the tallest building in New York, until the completion of One World Trade Center in May 2013
- One World Trade Center is the tallest building in the western hemisphere, and the third-tallest building in the world by pinnacle height.
- One World Trade Center
  - Height: 1,776 ft (541.3m) (architectural height)
  - New York City (40°42′46.8″N 074°0′48.6″W)
  - Year completed: May 10, 2013
  - Owner: Port Authority of New York and New Jersey
  - Stories: Total – 105 (86 usable above-ground floors, 91–99 and 103–104 designated as mechanical space, 100-102 observation floors, top floor designated as 105)
  - Total height (including pinnacle): 1,792 ft
- WSPX-TV Tower
  - Height: 1,176 ft (358.4 m)
  - West Monroe (43°18′18″N 076°3′0″W)
  - Year built: 1998
  - Owner: Spectrasite through American Towers
  - FCC ASRN: 1059064
  - Tallest guyed mast in New York State

=== North Carolina ===
- WBTV Television Tower (Charlotte CBS 3)
  - Height: 2,000 ft (609.6 m)
  - Dallas (35°21′51″N 081°11′12″W)
  - Year built: 1984
  - Owner: Gray Media Group
- WITN/WNCT Television Tower/WNCT 107.9 FM Radio (Eastern North Carolina NBC/CBS)
  - Height: 1,985 ft (605 m)
  - Grifton
  - Year built: 1979
  - Owner: Tall Towers, Inc. (joint venture between WITN and WNCT)
- WRAL Television Tower
  - Height: 2,000 ft (609.5 m)
  - Auburn (35°40′35.1″N 78°32′07.2″W)
  - Built in 1989 as replacement for two masts of the same height, which collapsed during an ice storm

=== North Dakota ===
- KVLY Television Tower (Fargo NBC 11)
  - Height: 1,987 ft (605.6 m)
  - Blanchard (47°20′32″N 097°17′21″W)
  - Year built: 1963
  - Owner: Gray Media
  - This tower was known as the KTHI Television Tower until June 1995. It was the fourth-tallest structure in the world, eclipsed only by the Burj Khalifa in Dubai, United Arab Emirates (completed in 2009), the Tokyo Sky Tree in Japan (completed in 2012) and the Shanghai Tower in China. From 1974 until its collapse in 1991, the Warsaw radio mast in Poland also eclipsed the KVLY-TV mast. This tower is used so KVLY-TV can cover both Fargo and Grand Forks. In 2019, the top mount antenna was removed, dropping the overall height to 1,987 ft (605.6 m)
- KRDK-TV Television Tower (Fargo/Valley City CBS 4)
  - Height: 2,060 ft (628 m)
  - Galesburg (47°16′45″N 97°20′27″W)
  - Year built: 1998
  - The KRDK-TV tower is the world's fourth-tallest man-made structure. It had collapsed three times due to winter and summer storms, though the first time it collapsed in 1968, it was caused from a Marine helicopter cutting four guy wires of the tower. The KVLY TV tower, was the world's fourth-tallest man-made structure, is only about 5 mi (8.0 km) from the KRDK-TV tower. This tower is used so KRDK-TV can cover both Fargo and Grand Forks until 2019 when the height was reduced

=== Ohio ===
- SpectraSite Communications LLC (Youngstown CBS 27)
  - Height: 1,476 ft (450 m)
  - Boardman (41°3′23.4″N 80°38′43″W)
  - Year built: 1976
  - Owner: American Tower
  - There was a taller tower from 1987 or 1988 until 1994 or 1995 when it was dismantled. It belonged to WCOM-TV (Mansfield Ind 68) and was located just south of Butler, Ohio. WCOM-TV signed on March 3, 1988. The height of the tower was 1,748 ft (533 m). WCOM-TV used the tall tower and a directional antenna to try to serve the Columbus market. The station went dark in 1991 and the tower was sold to a religious broadcaster in South Carolina to be used as two separate 800 ft (240 m) towers. An engineer has reported that part of the tower was still on the ground in Sumter, South Carolina
- WNWO Television Tower (Toledo NBC 24)
  - Height: 1,437 ft (438 m)
  - Oregon (41°40′03″N 083°21′22″W)
  - Year built: 1983
  - Owner: Barrington Broadcasting
- Educational Media Foundation (Portsmouth K-Love)
  - Height: 1,220 ft (371.9 m)
  - Southshore (38°41′0.00″N 83°0′46.00″W)
  - Year built: 2006
  - Owner: Educational Media Foundation

=== Oklahoma ===
- Perry Broadcasting Tower (KVSP 103.5 FM)
  - Height: 2,000 ft (609.5 m)
  - Carnegie (35°15′03″N 098°36′54″W)
  - FCC database lists tower as being in Alfalfa, Oklahoma, a nonincorporated community north of Carnegie
  - At 2,000 ft (610 m), this is the tallest structure in Oklahoma
  - It is used solely for the broadcast of KVSP 103.5 FM (Power 103.5), with studios in Oklahoma City
  - Year built: 2004
  - Owner: Perry Broadcasting of Southwest Oklahoma
- KTUL Television Tower (Tulsa ABC 8)
  - Height: 1,909 ft (582 m)
  - Coweta (35°58′08″N 095°36′56″W)
  - Year built: 1988
  - Owner: KTUL, LLC

=== Oregon ===
- KPDX Television Tower (Portland PDX 49)
  - Height: 1,081 ft (329 m)
  - Portland (45°31′22″N 122°45′11″W)
  - Year built: 1983
  - Owner: KPDX-TV (PDX 49) / Meredith Corporation

=== Pennsylvania ===
- WPVI Television Tower (Philadelphia ABC 6)
  - Height: 1,276 ft (389 m)
  - Philadelphia (40°02′33″N 075°14′32″W)
  - Year built: 1998
  - Owner: WPVI Inc./CBS
- Homer City Generating Station
  - Height: 1,217 ft (371 m)
  - Year built: 1969
  - Owner: Edison International
  - Tallest chimney in the United States

=== Rhode Island ===
- WLNE Television Tower (Providence ABC 6)
  - Height: 1,001 ft (305 m)
  - Tiverton (41°35′48″N 071°11′22″W)
  - Year built: 1965
  - Owner: Citadel Communications

=== South Carolina ===
- WCSC Television Tower (Charleston CBS 5)
  - Height: 2,000 ft (609.6 m)
  - Awendaw (32°55′29″N 079°41′57″W)
  - Year built: 1986
  - Owner: Gray Media
- Diversified Communications Tower
  - Height: 2,000 ft (609.6 m)
  - Floyd Dale (34°22'3.0" N, 79°19'48.0" W)
  - Year built: 1981

=== South Dakota ===
- KDLT Television Tower (Sioux Falls NBC 46)
  - Height: 1,999 ft (609 m)
  - Rowena (43°30′18″N 096°33′23″W)
  - Year built: 1999
  - Owner: Red River Broadcast LLC

=== Tennessee ===
- WIMZ-FM Tower
  - Height: 1,752 feet (534 m)
  - Knoxville (36°08′06″N 083°43′29″W)
  - Year built: 1963
  - Owner: South Central Communications
  - The tower is home to WIMZ-FM 103.5, whose antenna is at the top. The tower is located 1 mi (1.6 km) east of House Mountain and stands 1,752 ft (534 m) above ground level. When used for television broadcasts by its former owner, Multimedia, Inc. (former licensee of WBIR-TV, Knoxville) it was shielded by mountains from the audience in the western Knoxville suburbs such as Farragut, Oak Ridge, and Oliver Springs. This tower was built because the owners of WBIR-TV could not obtain land atop nearby House Mountain, because the only land suitable for a television tower base on the mountain had been purchased by the station's main competitor WATE-TV, Knoxville. When completed, it was, for a short time the tallest man-made structure on Earth.

=== Texas ===
- Tall Towers Era
  - Height: 2,000 ft (609.6 m)
  - Era (33°29′5.5″N 097°24′44.8″W)
  - Year built: 2006
  - Owner: Tall Towers Ventures, Inc
- Winnie Broadcasting Tower (103.7 MHz FM)
  - Height: 2,000 ft (609.6 m)
  - Winnie (29°56′9.8″N 094°30′39.4″W)
  - Year built: 2005
  - Owner: Educational Media Foundation
- Liverpool Broadcast Tower (Houston 107.5 FM)
  - Height: 1,999 ft (609.3 m)
  - Liverpool (29°17′17″N 095°13′54″W)
  - Year built: 1986
  - Owner: American Tower Corporation
- Salem Radio Properties Tower
  - Height: 1,999 ft (609.3 m)
  - Collinsville (33°32′8″N 096°49′55″W)
  - Year built: 2002
  - Owner: Salem Radio Properties
- Stowell Broadcasting Tower (97.5 MHz FM)
  - Height: 1,999 ft (609.3 m)
  - Stowell (29°41′52.5″N 094°24′9.3″W)
  - Year built: 2001
  - Owner: GOW Broadcasting
- Service Broadcasting Tower Decatur
  - Height: 1,994 ft (608.1 m)
  - Decatur (33°23′12.0″N 097°33′58.0″W)
  - Year built: 2000
  - Owner: Service Broadcasting Corp.
- Tall Tower Venture Devers
  - Height: 1,993 ft (607.7 m)
  - Devers (30°01′02.2″N 094°32′47.9″W)
  - Year built: 2006
  - Owner: Tall Towers Ventures, Inc

Height data according to FCC's ASR entries.

=== Utah ===
- Kennecott Smelter Smokestack
  - Height: 1,215 ft (370 m)
  - Magna (40°43′18″N 112°11′52″W)
  - Year built: 1979
  - Owner: Kennecott Utah Copper, LLC
  - The smokestack was designed to help the Garfield smelter comply with the Clean Air Act. It is a prominent structure along the shore of the Great Salt Lake adjacent to Interstate 80, about 10 mi (16 km) west of Salt Lake City. The smoke rises to an altitude of 8,540 ft (1,689 m) MSL. The tallest non-smokestack structure is a 660 ft (201 m) radio mast near Plain City, owned by the Bible Broadcasting inc.

=== Vermont ===
- WCAT (AM) Tower 1 (Burlington News/Talk 1390)
  - Height: 445 ft (136 m)
  - Burlington (44°29′47″N 073°12′49″W)
  - Year built: 1981
  - Owner: Hometown Broadcasting
  - Tower 1 of a three tower AM array

=== Virginia ===
- American Tower Corporation Tower Suffolk
  - Height: 1,254.9 feet (382.5 m)
  - Suffolk at 36°48'31.8" N and 76°30'11.3"
  - Year built: 2003
  - Owner: American Tower Corporation )
  - WGNT, WHRO-TV, WTKR, WTPC-TV, WTVZ-TV

=== Washington ===
- Columbia Center
  - Height: 967 ft (295 m)
  - Seattle, 701 Fifth Avenue (47°36′16″N 122°19′48″W)
  - Year built: 1982–85
  - Owner: Equity Office Properties
  - The Columbia Center was intended to be 1,005 ft (306 m) tall but was disapproved by the FAA. It was built in 1982–85 and has 76 floors
- KREM Tower
  - The tallest antenna tower is the 940 ft (287 m) KREM (CBS-2) tower at Spokane

=== West Virginia ===
- Chimney of Mitchell Power Plant
  - Height: 1206 ft (368 m)
  - Moundsville, West Virginia
  - Year built: 1968
  - Owner: AEP

=== Wisconsin ===
- WEAU Television Tower (Eau Claire NBC 13)
  - Height: 1,998 ft (609 m)
  - Fairchild (44°39′50″N 090°57′41″W)
  - Year built: 1966
  - Owner: WEAU-TV
  - Collapsed on March 23, 2011

=== Wyoming ===
- Gillette Wyoming Legends Communication Tower
  - Height: 1,153 ft (351.4 m)
  - Gillette (43°59′57.0″N 105°15′17.0″W)
  - Year built: 2009
- Former LORAN-C facility antenna
  - Height: 700 ft (213 m)
  - Gillette (44°00′11″N 105°37′24″W)
  - Year built: ?
  - Owner: U.S. Coast Guard
  - This Coast Guard site in Wyoming was part of the worldwide LORAN marine navigation network. The US Loran system was shut down February 8, 2010. The tower was especially useful to ships plying the Great Lakes. The system radiated 540 kW of power

== Puerto Rico ==
- Telemundo WKAQ TV Tower
  - Height: 1,102 ft (336 m)
  - Cayey (18°06′47.0″N 66°03′09.0″W )

An incomplete list of the tallest structures in Puerto Rico. Main reference: U.S. Federal Communications Commission (FCC) database

Structure	Height (ft)	Height (metres)	Year built	Structure Type	Use	Place	Comments
Aguada VLF transmission mast	1,205 ft (367 m)	367.3 m	?	Guyed mast	VLF/LF-transmission	Aguada	Operated by US Navy
Telemundo WKAQ TV Tower	1,105 ft (337 m)	336.8 m	1971	Guyed mast	UHF/VHF-transmission	Cayey	
Cayey Pegasus Broadcasting Tower	1,091 ft (333 m)	332.5 m	1966	Guyed mast	UHF/VHF-transmission	Cayey	Destroyed by Hurricane Maria on September 20, 2017
Arso Radio Tower	682 ft (208 m)	208 m	1996	Guyed mast	UHF/VHF-transmission	Cabo Rojo	
La Cadena del Milagro Tower	548 ft (167 m)	167 m	1991	Lattice tower	UHF/VHF-transmission	Utuado	Destroyed by Hurricane Maria on September 20, 2017
Arecibo Observatory	492 ft (150 m)	150 m	1963	Radio telescope	Radio and Radar astronomy	Arecibo	World's largest radio telescope

== By structural type ==
Tallest structures in the United States for different uses/structural types. Please expand and/or correct, if necessary

Category	Structure	City	Height
Guyed mast	KRDK-TV mast	Traill County, North Dakota	2,060 feet (627.9 m)
Skyscraper	One World Trade Center	New York City	1,776 feet (541.3 m)
Guyed mast insulated against ground	VLF transmitter Lualualei	Lualualei, HI	1,503 feet (458.1 m)
Chimney	Homer City Generating Station	Homer City, Pennsylvania	1,217 feet (370.9 m)
Concrete tower	Stratosphere Tower	Las Vegas	1,149 feet (350.2 m)
Free-standing lattice tower	WITI TV Tower	Shorewood, Wisconsin	1,081 feet (329.5 m)
Bridge	Royal Gorge Bridge	Cañon City, Colorado	1,053 feet (321.0 m)
Suspension Bridge	Golden Gate Bridge	San Francisco	746 feet (227.4 m)
Dam	Oroville Dam	Oroville, California	770 feet (234.7 m)
Masonry	Anaconda Smelter Stack	Anaconda, Montana	585 feet (178.3 m)
Monumental column	San Jacinto Monument	La Porte, Texas	567 feet (172.8 m)
Stone	Washington Monument	Washington, D.C.	555 feet (169.2 m)
Electricity pylon	Sacramento-San Joaquin Delta Powerlines	Sacramento, California	565 feet (172.2 m)
Industrial building	VAB	Kennedy Space Center, Florida	526 feet (160.3 m)
Church	Riverside Church	New York City	392 feet (119.5 m)
Aerial tramway support pillar	Roosevelt Island Tramway	New York City	250 feet (76.2 m)

== See also ==
- List of tallest structures in the United States by height
- List of tallest observation towers in the United States
- Guyed mast
