= American Towers Tower Liverpool =

- Interactive map of the American Towers Tower Liverpool area

General information
- Status: Completed
- Type: Guyed tower
- Location: 4500-4610 Nolan Road, Liverpool, Texas, United States
- Coordinates: 29°17′57″N 95°14′12″W
- Completed: 1992
- Owner: American Tower

Height
- Height: 598.3 metres (1,963 ft)

The American Towers Tower Liverpool is a 598.3-meter (1,963 ft) guyed tower for FM- and TV-constructions located in Liverpool, Texas. The American Towers Tower Liverpool was built in 1992 and is property of American Towers, Inc.
