= Transtower =

Television tower in Walnut Grove, California

Coordinates: 38°14′50″N 121°30′7″W

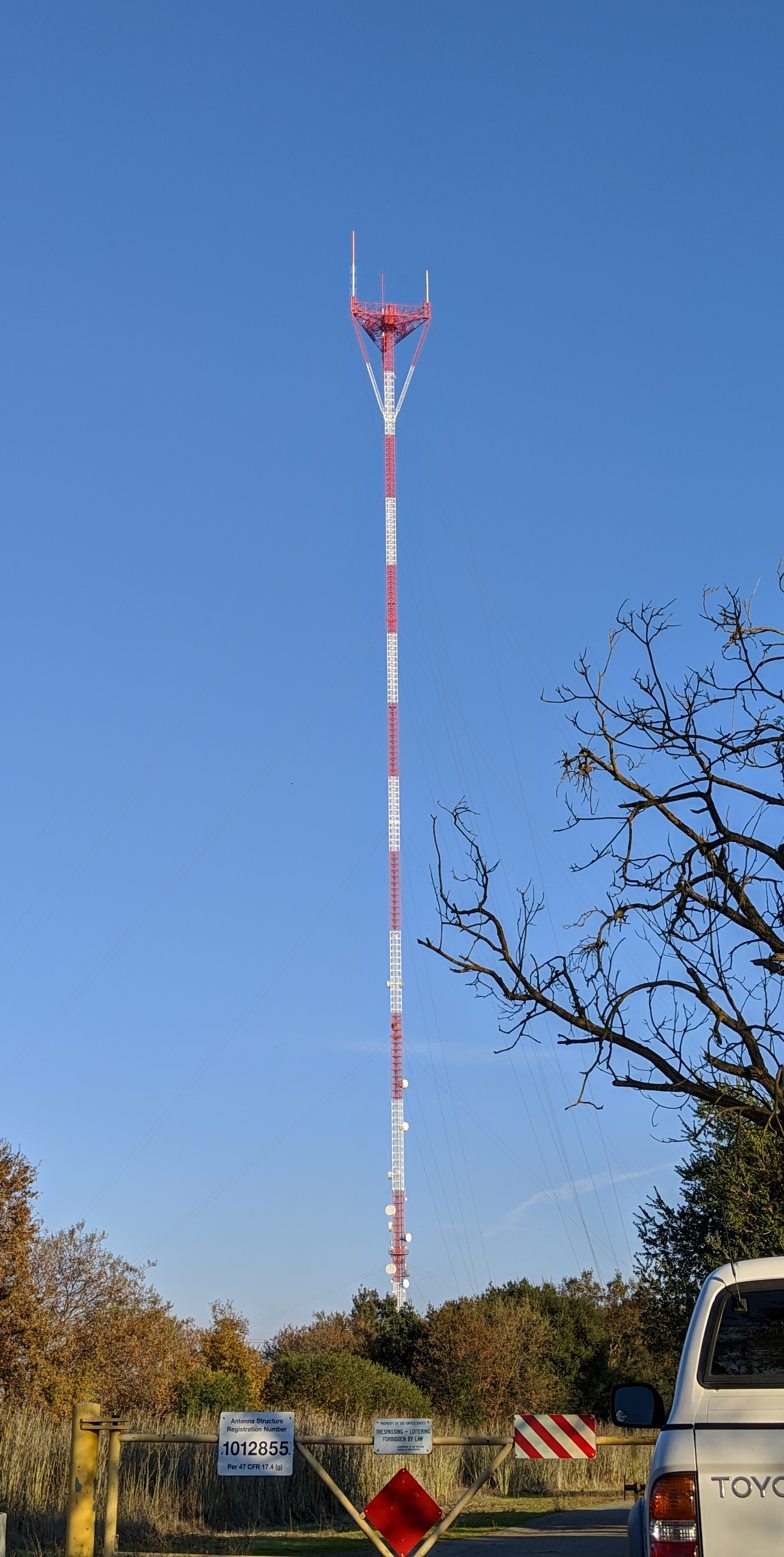

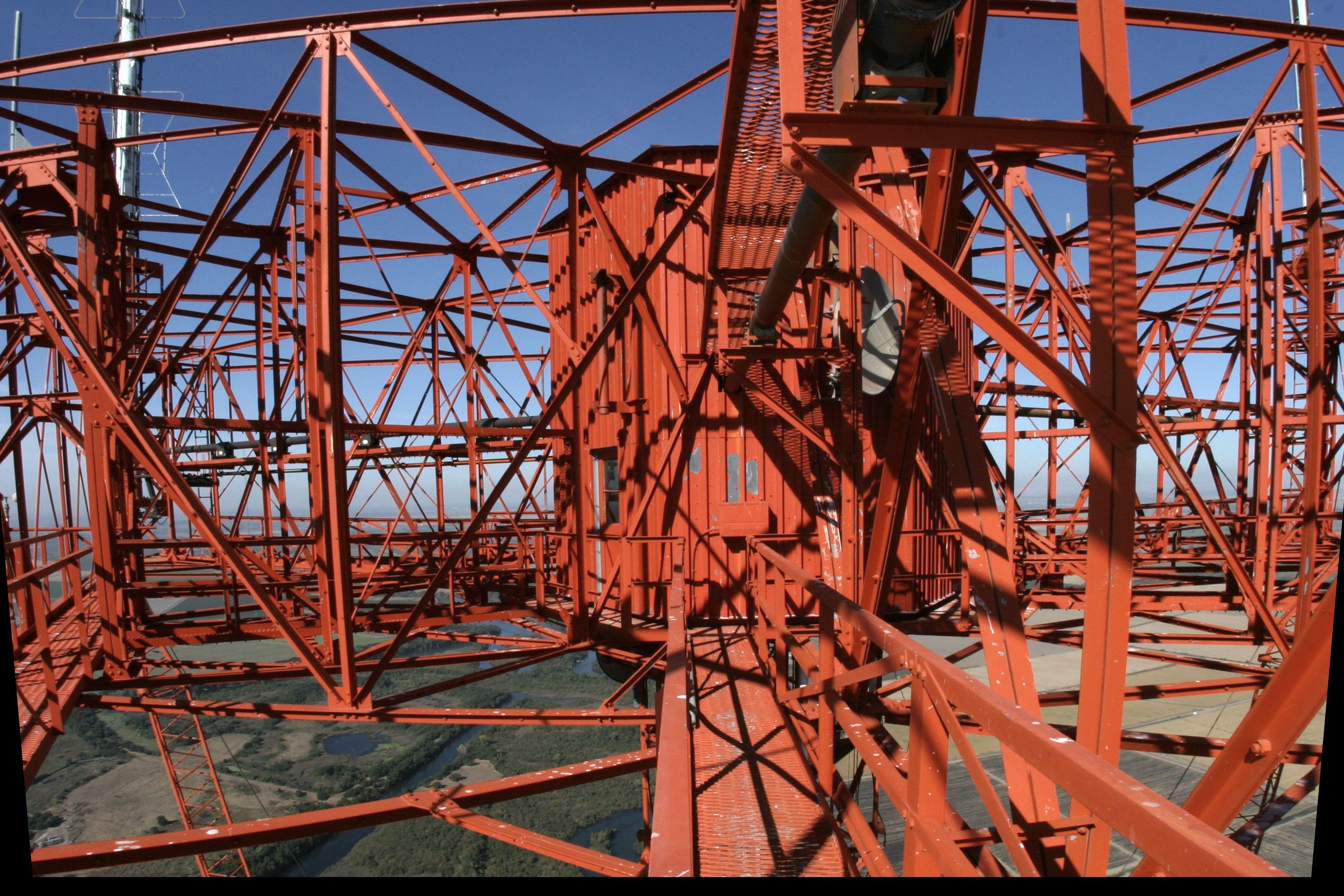
Walnut Grove Tower top building - panoramio

KXTV/KOVR/KCRA Tower is a 472.1-meter-high (1,549 ft) guy-wired aerial mast for the transmission of FM radio and television programs in Walnut Grove, California. Construction began on the KOVR/KCRA Tower in 1959, and the tower was completed in 1961. At that time it was one of the tallest structures in the world.

When built, it stood alone as a landmark visible from great distances, so for years it was popularly known as The Walnut Grove Tower. It is also known as Transtower. Three taller masts have since been constructed in the area that tend to be more visible because their white strobe lighting catches the eye more readily than the older tower's more traditional red lighting—though this tower is the only one painted red and white. The newer towers in the area are all simple vertical steel, but this older tower has a distinctive triangular "candelabra" platform at the top that reflects the original purpose of the tower as a world-class transmission facility for the three major stations then covering the Sacramento-Stockton-Modesto media market. One corner of the triangle held the antenna for KCRA (since moved to the taller Hearst-Argyle Tower), and the other two held the antennas of KOVR and KXTV (since moved to the taller KXTV/KOVR Tower), which is also a candelabra, though with a less wide top than this one. KCRA-TV began transmitting from this tower in January 1962. KXTV is no longer a partner or tenant on the tower.

KXTV filmed portions of its 1964 "KXTV Country" promotion atop the tower. The station's top manager addressed viewers from a tower platform. Also aloft, a musician sang a rendition of the '49er chanty "Banks of the Sacramento" which was modified to refer to the tower: "High in a tower in the western sky."

== Current tenants ==
- KSPX-TV Ch. 29/48
- KCRA Ch. 3/35 (Backup site)
- KMAX Ch 31/21 (backup site)
- KOVR Ch 13/25 (backup site)
- KEAR-FM 88.1&;MHz

== See also ==
- List of masts
- List of tallest structures in the United States
