= WCML Television Tower Atlanta =

WCML-TV Tower Atlanta
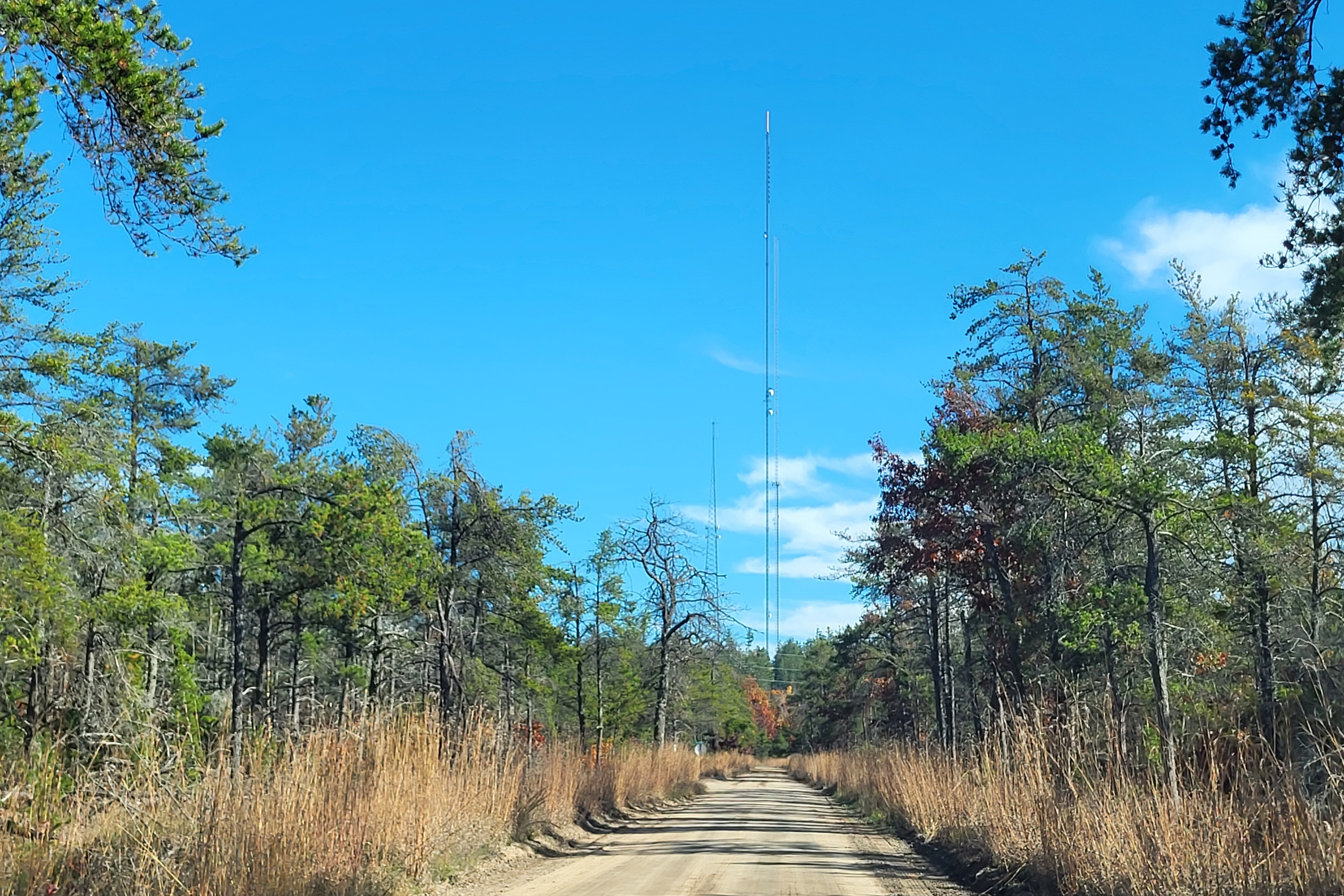
- View from Tower Road near M-33

General information
- Type: Radio and TV transmission tower
- Location: Montmorency Township, Michigan
- Coordinates: 45°08′17″N 84°09′44″W
- Completed: 2010
- Owner: WCMU Public Media

Height
- Height: 1,177 ft (359 m)

The WCML-TV Tower Atlanta, also known as the WCMU-TV Tower Atlanta, was a 1,349.1-foot (411.21 m) tall guyed mast for the transmission of radio and television programs located 9.89 miles (15.91 km) north of the unincorporated city of Atlanta, Michigan in Montmorency Township. The structure, owned by Central Michigan University, had been the tallest human construction in the state of Michigan from its completion in 1975 until its replacement with a newer, but shorter tower, standing 1,177 feet (358.8 m) tall, in 2010. This tower was (as is the current tower) used by WCML-TV and WCML-FM, which are full time remote rebroadcasters of WCMU-TV and WCMU-FM respectively, as part of the WCMU Public Media network. The new tower is not the tallest tower in Michigan with several being taller, including: WJMN-TV (at 1,252 feet (382 m)), WFQX-TV (at 1,290.4 feet (393.3 m)), and WEYI-TV (at 1,322.9 feet (403.2 m)).

== See also ==
- List of masts
- Tallest structures in the U.S.
- List of the world's tallest structures
