= KCCI Tower =

Guyed TV tower in Alleman, Iowa, United States

Coordinates: 41°48′35″N 93°37′17″W

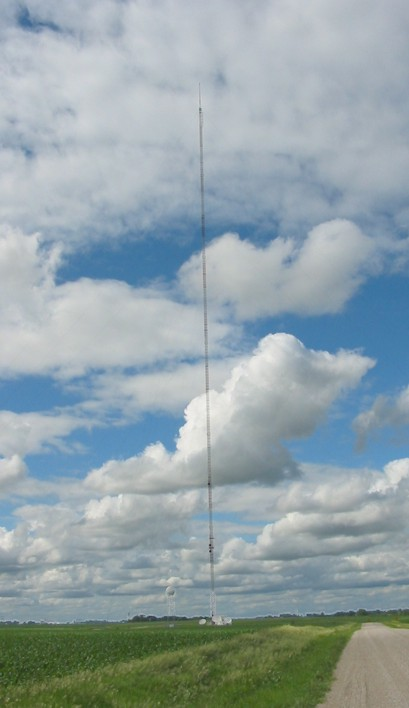
The KCCI Des Moines television tower at Alleman, Iowa.

KCCI's Alleman tower is a 609.6 metres (2,000 ft) tall guyed television tower standing near Alleman, Iowa, United States at 41°48'35.0" N and 93°37'17.0" W. The tower was built in 1974 and is used to transmit KCCI's digital signal. In the vicinity are towers used by the other Des Moines-area television stations as well as several FM radio stations. KCCI is a subsidiary of Hearst Television, a division of the Hearst Corporation.

== See also ==
- List of masts, Table of masts
- Tallest structures in the U.S.
- List of the world's tallest structures
