= WCIX TV Tower =

Television tower in Miami, United States

Coordinates: 25.5404°N 80.4684°W

WCIX TV Tower is a 539 metres (1,768 ft) guyed television transmission tower located at 17107 SW 248th Street, Miami, near Homestead, Florida. It was destroyed on August 24, 1992, by Hurricane Andrew and was rebuilt by LeBlanc Tower of Canada. The tower was actually fabricated and engineered by LeBlanc of Canada but was erected by Tower King Inc. of Atlanta, Georgia. At the time of erection the structure was the heaviest guy supported broadcast tower in the world. The tower is currently the transmission platform for four FM radio stations: WRGP (88.1), WDNA (88.9), WMLV (89.7), and WRTO-FM (98.3).
