= WLBT Tower =

Aerial mast in Raymond, Mississippi

Coordinates: 32°12′50″N 90°22′57″W

The WLBT Tower was a 610-metre-high (2,000 ft) guy-wired aerial mast for the transmission of FM radio and TV-programs in Raymond, Mississippi, United States, for the Jackson metro area. The mast was constructed in 1966. On October 23, 1997, the mast, which was property of Cosmos Broadcasting (WLBT a local NBC affiliate), collapsed during the renovation of its guy wires. Three workers of LeBlanc & Royle were killed. The tower was rebuilt in 1999.

== See also ==
- List of masts
