= Kennecott Garfield Smelter Stack =

Smokestack west of Magna, Utah

Coordinates: 40.721563°N 112.198118°W

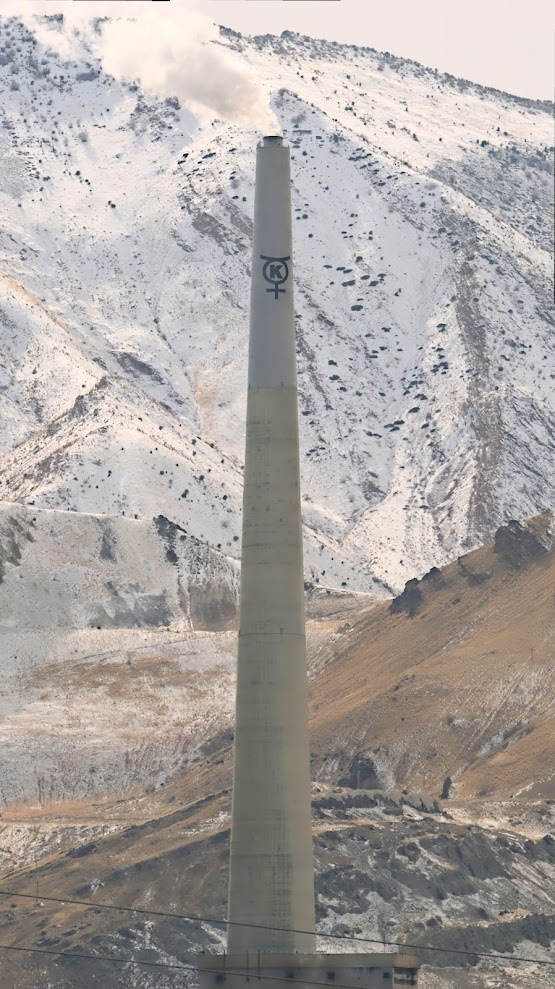
Kennecott Garfield Smelter Stack with its post 2023 paint scheme, February 2026

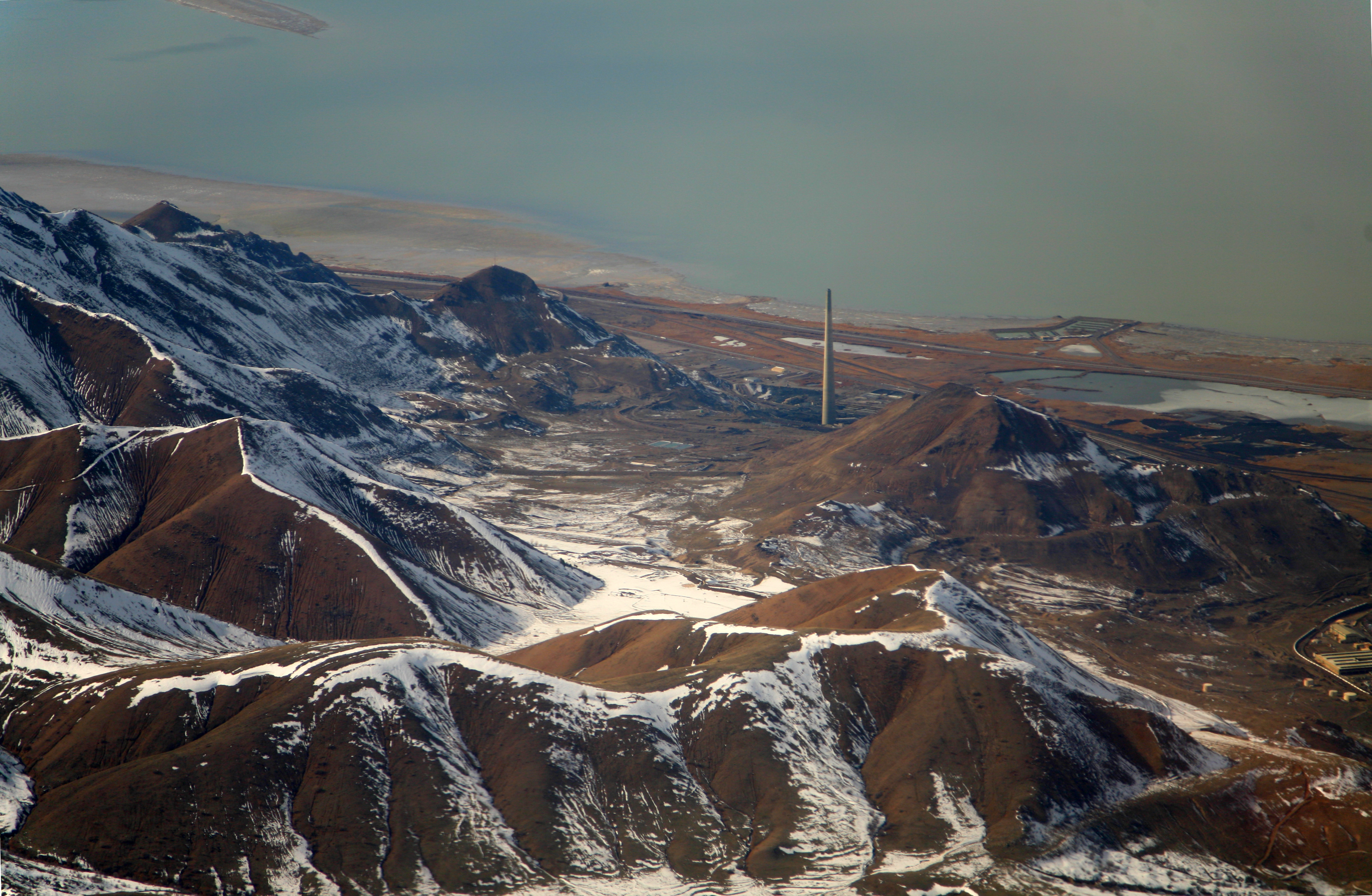
Aerial view of 1215-foot tall Garfield Smelter Stack, the north end of the Oquirrh Mountains and the Great Salt Lake, 2016

Kennecott Utah Copper LLC’s Garfield Smelter Stack is a 1,215-foot (370 m) high smokestack west of Magna, Utah, alongside Interstate 80 near the Great Salt Lake. It was built to disperse exhaust gases from the Kennecott Utah Copper smelter at Garfield, Utah. It is the 61st-tallest freestanding structure in the world, the 4th-tallest chimney, and the tallest freestanding structure west of the Mississippi River.

== Waste gases ==
The Garfield Smelter Stack was completed in 1974, replacing several earlier smokestacks, the tallest of which was 413 feet (126 m) high. The extra height was needed to meet the requirements of the Clean Air Act of 1970, to disperse waste gases according to new standards.

In response to new emissions limits and anticipated future state and federal standards, Outokumpu and Kennecott had conducted flash converting pilot tests from 1985 at Outokumpu's research facility in Finland. With the introduction of strict new environmental regulations in the state of Utah, the smelter's maximum permissible sulfur emission was decreased to 1,082 short tons (982 t) per year from the earlier 18,574 short tons (16,850 t). In 1995 a new, cleaner flash smelting furnace was commissioned. By 2004, the annual average SO_{2} emissions from the stack were 161.5 lb/h (73 kg/h), below the permitted average annual level of 211 lb/h (96 kg/h) (with a three-hour permitted SO_{2} limit of 552 lb/h (250 kg/h)).

The off-gases from the flash smelting furnace contain 35–40% sulfur dioxide. They are cooled and cleaned in a waste-heat boiler, electrostatic precipitator and scrubbing system before being sent to the sulfuric acid plant. The acid plant produces either 94% or 98% sulfuric acid with tail gas containing typically 50–70 ppm sulfur dioxide, resulting in a measured sulfur fixation of greater than 99.9%. In 2006, the company produced and sold approximately 833,000 short tons (756,000 t) of sulfuric acid, made from the formerly released gas. The acid recovery plant is designed to also recover waste heat from the process to produce electrical power. Approximately 24 MW of electrical power is generated, representing 70% of the smelter’s electrical requirements.

== Design and construction ==
The stack is 177 feet (54 m) in diameter at the bottom with 12-foot (3.7 m) walls, and rises directly from the ground. At the top it is 40 feet (12 m) in diameter and 12 inches (0.30 m) thick. A large fiberglass duct passes up the stack and carries gases to the top.

26,317 cubic yards (20,121 m^{3}) of concrete and 900 short tons (820 t) of steel were used in its construction. Construction commenced on August 26, 1974 and finished on November 19, an 84-day concrete pour. It cost $16.3 million at the time to build, equivalent to $106 million in 2025.

The top can be accessed by a Swedish-built elevator that crawls up a gear track on the inside surface. It takes 20 minutes to ascend the stack, although workers only need to travel up to the 300-foot level each day, to service the air-sampling station.

The Garfield Smelter Stack is the tallest free-standing structure west of the Mississippi River, the fourth tallest smokestack in the world and the sixty-first tallest free-standing structure on earth. It is approximately as tall as the Berlin TV Tower, the Bank of China Tower in Hong Kong, or the Bank of America Tower in New York City. It is the only operating smelter chimney left in Utah.

== See also ==
- List of chimneys
- List of tallest freestanding structures in the world
