= Hoyt, Colorado =

Unincorporated community in Morgan County, CO, USA

- Unincorporated community
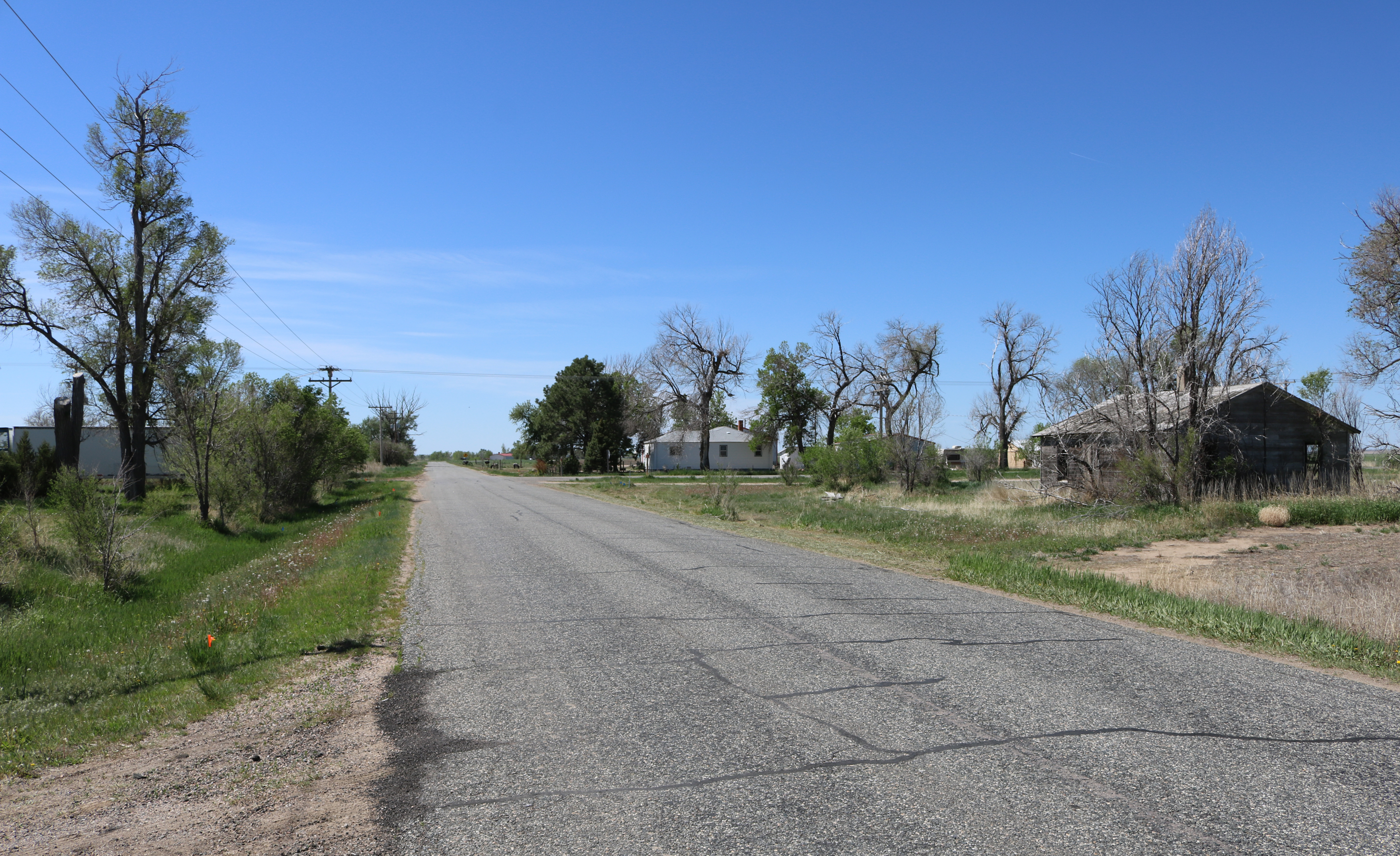
- Hoyt, looking south along Morgan County Road 4

- Location within the state of Colorado Hoyt (the United States)
- Coordinates: 40°00′56″N 104°04′30″W
- Country: United States
- State: Colorado
- Counties: Morgan
- Elevation: 4,764 ft (1,452 m)
- Time zone: UTC-7 (MST)
  - Summer (DST): UTC-6 (MDT)
- ZIP code: 80654 (Wiggins)
- GNIS place ID: 180910

Hoyt is a small unincorporated community in Morgan County, Colorado, United States. The 1,996-foot (608-meter) high Hoyt Radio Tower is located near Hoyt. The community was named after James A. Hoyt, an early settler.

A post office at Hoyt had been in operation since 1906. The U.S. Post Office at Wiggins (ZIP Code 80654) now serves Hoyt postal addresses.
