= Hoyt Radio Tower =

Communication tower

Coordinates: 39°55′22″N 103°58′20″W

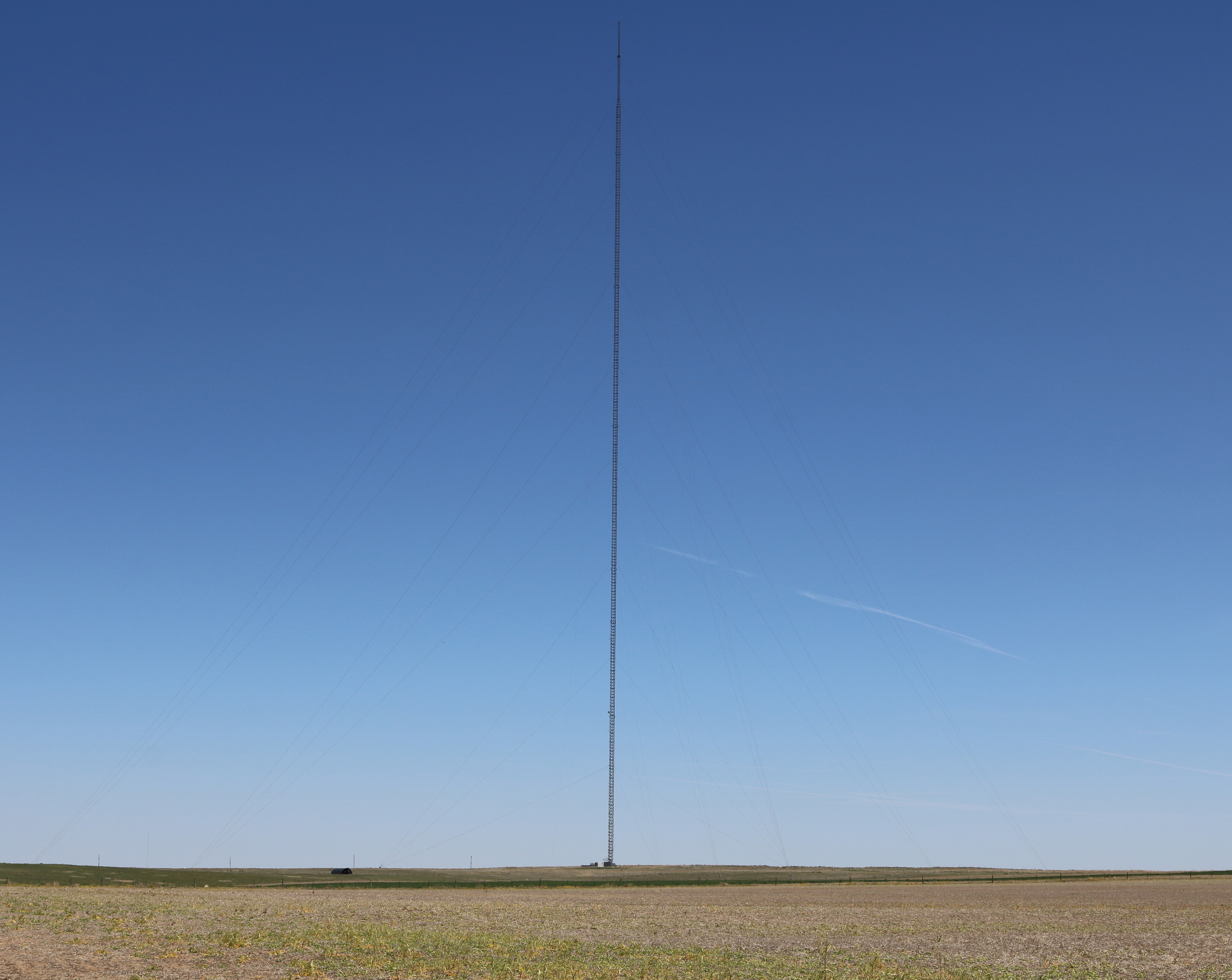
Hoyt Radio Tower.

Hoyt Radio Tower is the tallest man-made structure in Colorado and one of the tallest structures in the world. Hoyt Radio Tower is a 608.1-meter (1,995 ft) tall guyed mast near Hoyt, Colorado (50 km east-northeast of Denver).

It was built in 2003 by Acme Towers, LLC, and is currently owned and operated by Pillar Ministries, Inc. for FM-broadcasting, stations KSRC and KFCO, as well as emergency services. Unlike shorter towers, which are painted red and white in seven alternating bands for aircraft warning, the Hoyt Radio Tower is unpainted and uses strobe lights for aircraft warning.

The Hoyt Radio Tower's basement is situated 1,509 meters (4,951 ft) above sea level, making it not only one of the world's tallest structures but also one of the few supertall structures in the world whose basement is situated at an altitude over 1,000 meters (3,300 ft).
