= Liverpool, Texas =

City in Brazoria County, Texas, United States

- City
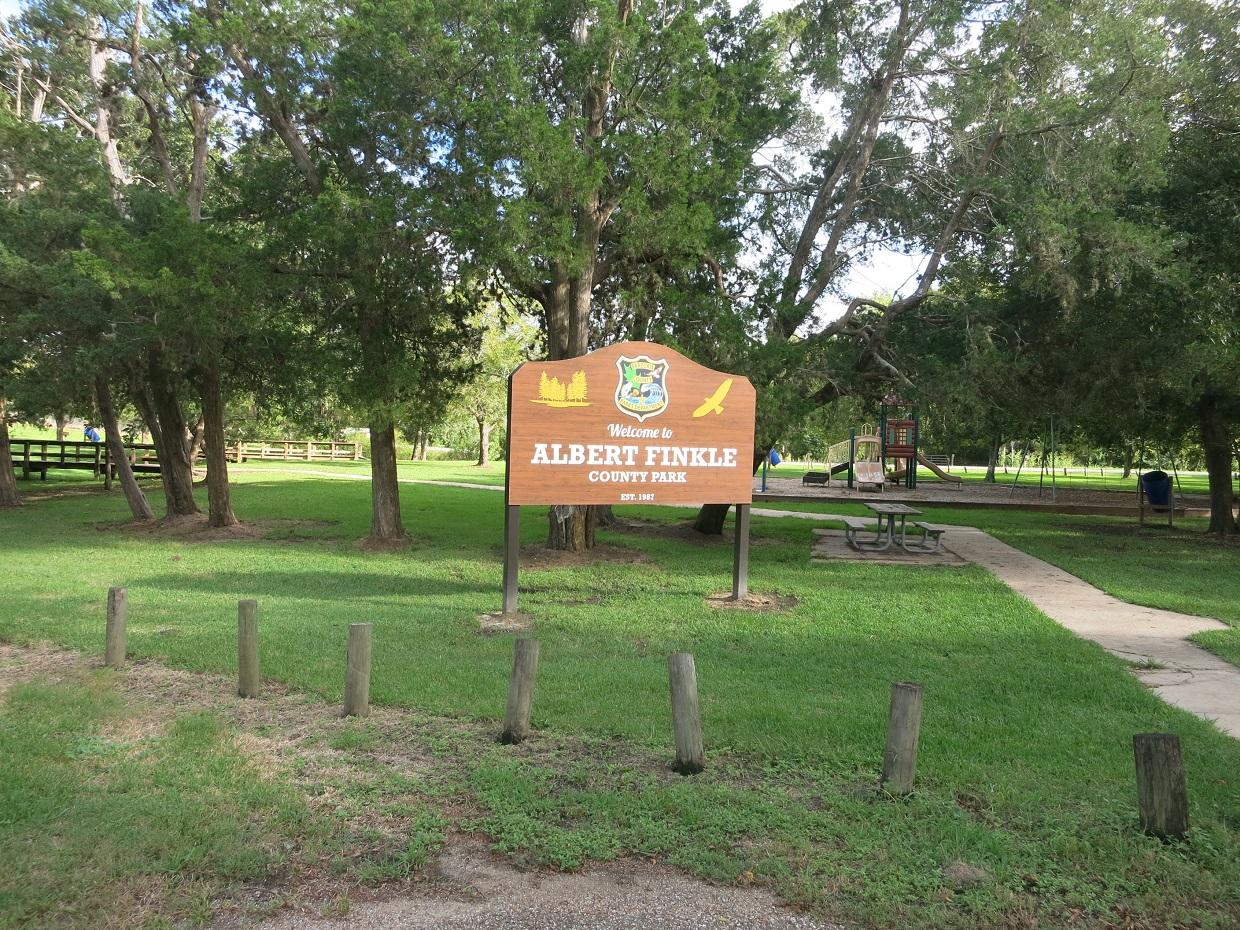
- Albert Finkle County Park in Liverpool

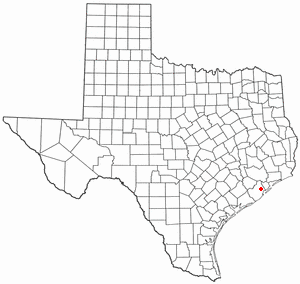
- Location of Liverpool, Texas

- Coordinates: 29°17′57″N 95°16′39″W
- Country: United States
- State: Texas
- County: Brazoria

Area
  - Total: 1.09 sq mi (2.83 km^{2})
  - Land: 1.09 sq mi (2.83 km^{2})
  - Water: 0 sq mi (0.00 km^{2})
- Elevation: 20 ft (6 m)

Population (2020)
  - Total: 475
  - Density: 435/sq mi (168/km^{2})
- Time zone: UTC-6 (Central (CST))
  - Summer (DST): UTC-5 (CDT)
- ZIP code: 77577
- Area codes: 713, 281, 832, 346, 621
- FIPS code: 48-43120
- 11GNIS feature ID: 1361569
- Website: www.liverpooltx.gov

Liverpool is a city in Brazoria County, Texas, United States, named after the city of Liverpool in England. It is located along the Union Pacific Railroad and County Road 171, northeast of Angleton and south of Alvin. The population was 475 at the 2020 census.

== History ==
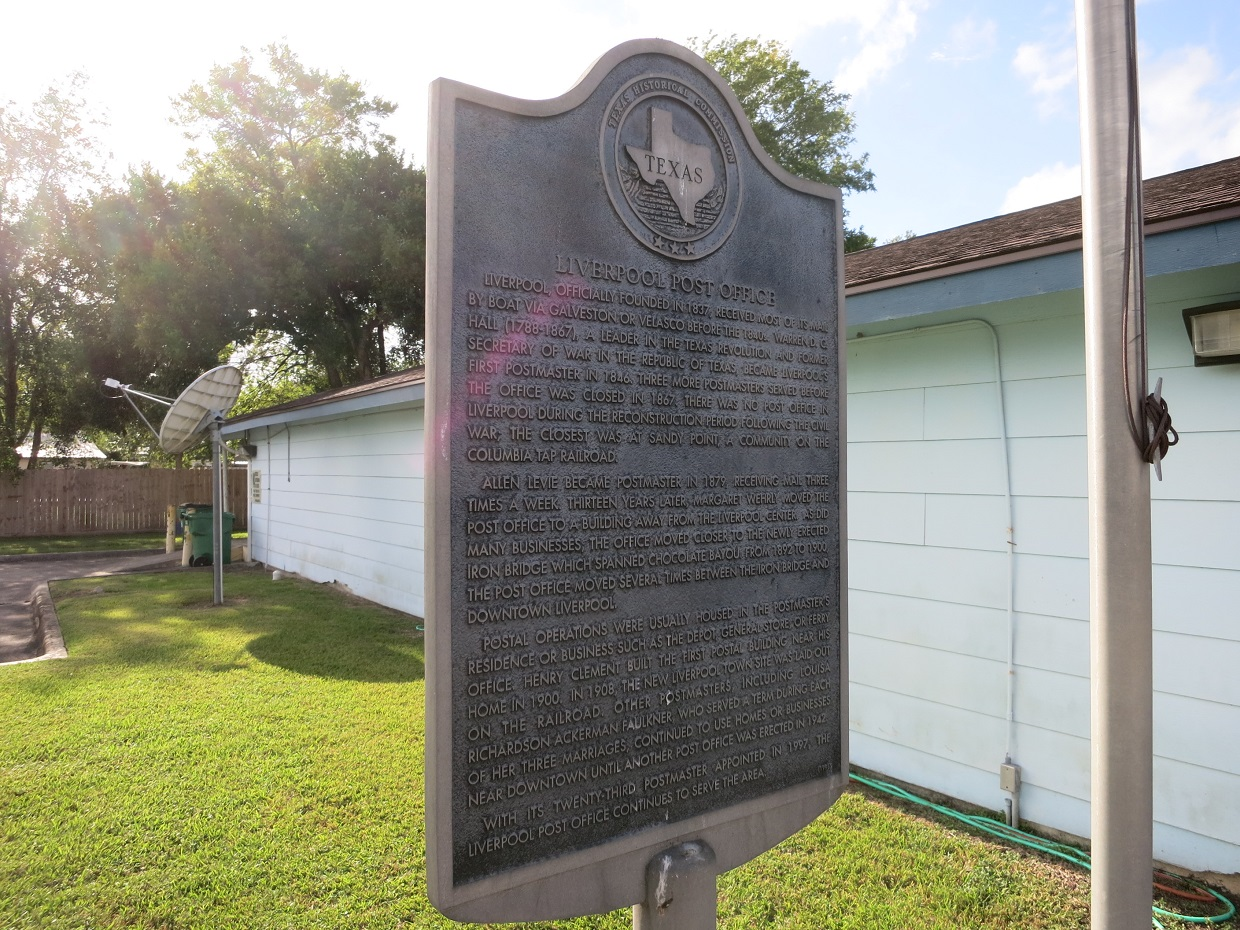
Historical marker at US Post Office

In 1827, a trading post was set up at Liverpool. A settlement existed in 1834 and two years later a schoolteacher was hired. The town was formally established in 1837. It became a shipping point from Stephen F. Austin's colony for wool, hides, and produce via Chocolate Bayou. A person called Commodore Nelson named the town after the English port Liverpool. A post office opened in the town in 1846, but closed in 1867. The population began to decline after the American Civil War until there were only 20 residents in 1884. Nevertheless, the post office reopened in 1879 and remained. By 1890, the population numbered 136. In 1906, the local whites-only schools counted three teachers and 48 students. By 1914, the town had grown to 400 residents and included a hotel and two general stores. The population decreased in the 1920s so that it was about 150 in 1966. By 1988, the population numbered 627, helped by the opening of a nearby Monsanto plant. The 1990 and 2000 censuses recorded around 400 residents each.

== Geography ==
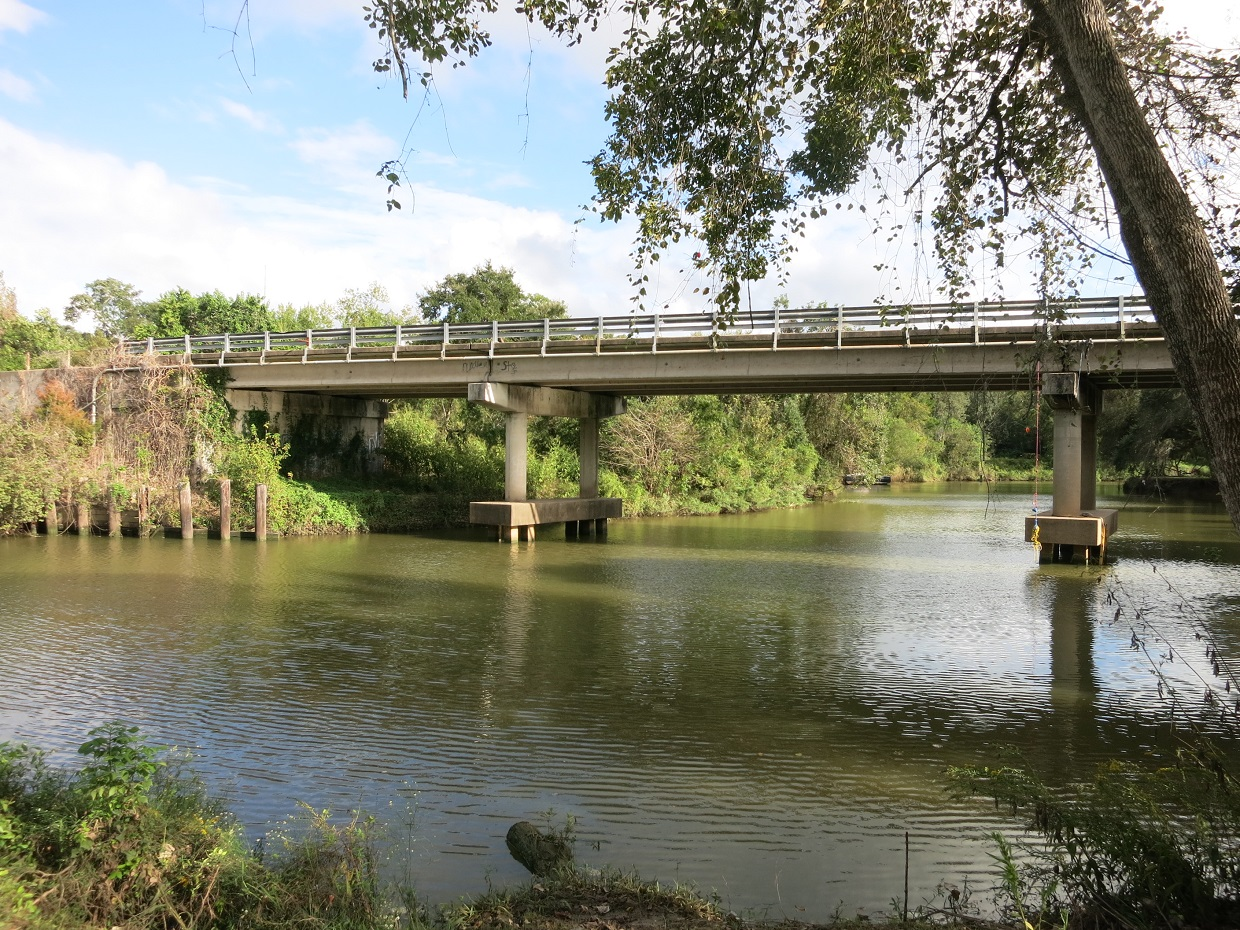
CR 171 bridge over Chocolate Bayou, October 2019

Liverpool is located in northeastern Brazoria County at 29°17′57″N 95°16′39″W (29.299272, –95.277470). It is bordered on the east by Chocolate Bayou. The city limits extend northwest on either side of Main Street for 2 miles (3 km) to reach Texas State Highway 35. From that point, it is 14 miles (23 km) southwest to Angleton, the county seat, and 8 miles (13 km) northeast to the center of Alvin.

According to the United States Census Bureau, Liverpool has a total area of 1.1 square miles (2.8 km^{2}), all land.

== Demographics ==
Historical population
| Census | Pop. | Note | %± |
|---|---|---|---|
| 1970 | 319 | | — |
| 1980 | 602 | | 88.7% |
| 1990 | 396 | | −34.2% |
| 2000 | 404 | | 2.0% |
| 2010 | 482 | | 19.3% |
| 2020 | 475 | | −1.5% |
U.S. Decennial Census; 2020 Census

=== 2020 census ===
As of the 2020 census, Liverpool had a population of 475. The median age was 43.1 years, with 21.5% of residents under the age of 18 and 18.5% of residents 65 years of age or older. For every 100 females there were 91.5 males, and for every 100 females age 18 and over there were 89.3 males age 18 and over.

0.0% of residents lived in urban areas, while 100.0% lived in rural areas.

There were 178 households in Liverpool, of which 31.5% had children under the age of 18 living in them. Of all households, 57.9% were married-couple households, 16.3% were households with a male householder and no spouse or partner present, and 17.4% were households with a female householder and no spouse or partner present. About 19.1% of all households were made up of individuals and 6.2% had someone living alone who was 65 years of age or older.

There were 221 housing units, of which 19.5% were vacant. The homeowner vacancy rate was 5.2% and the rental vacancy rate was 10.8%.

Racial composition as of the 2020 census
| Race | Number | Percent |
|---|---|---|
| White | 369 | 77.7% |
| Black or African American | 10 | 2.1% |
| American Indian and Alaska Native | 5 | 1.1% |
| Asian | 0 | 0.0% |
| Native Hawaiian and Other Pacific Islander | 0 | 0.0% |
| Some other race | 27 | 5.7% |
| Two or more races | 64 | 13.5% |
| Hispanic or Latino (of any race) | 110 | 23.2% |

=== 2000 census ===
As of the census of 2000, there were 404 people, 152 households, and 115 families residing in the city. The population density was 425.4 inhabitants per square mile (164.2/km^{2}). There were 189 housing units at an average density of 199.0 per square mile (76.8/km^{2}). The racial makeup of the city was 88.61% White, 0.74% African American, 1.49% Native American, 0.25% Asian, 6.68% from other races, and 2.23% from two or more races. Hispanic or Latino of any race were 9.90% of the population.

There were 152 households, out of which 30.3% had children under the age of 18 living with them, 60.5% were married couples living together, 9.2% had a female householder with no husband present, and 24.3% were non-families. 19.7% of all households were made up of individuals, and 9.9% had someone living alone who was 65 years of age or older. The average household size was 2.66 and the average family size was 3.03.

In the city, the population was spread out, with 25.7% under the age of 18, 8.2% from 18 to 24, 33.4% from 25 to 44, 23.0% from 45 to 64, and 9.7% who were 65 years of age or older. The median age was 35 years. For every 100 females, there were 112.6 males. For every 100 females age 18 and over, there were 109.8 males.

The median income for a household in the city was $48,750, and the median income for a family was $51,042. Males had a median income of $36,875 versus $30,938 for females. The per capita income for the city was $19,492. About 7.0% of families and 6.6% of the population were below the poverty line, including 7.4% of those under age 18 and none of those age 65 or over.

== Municipal and Government services ==
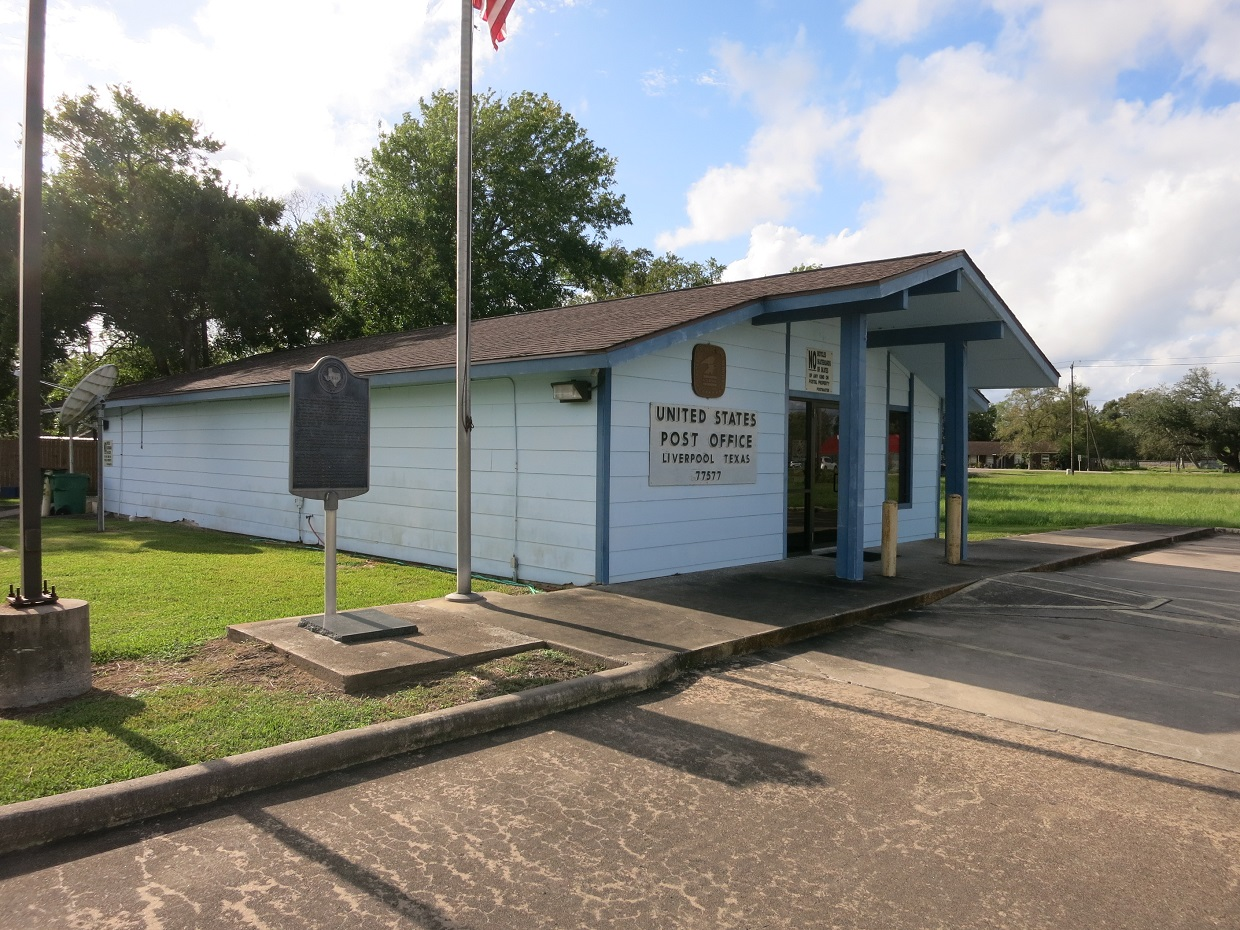
US Post Office, Liverpool, TX 77577

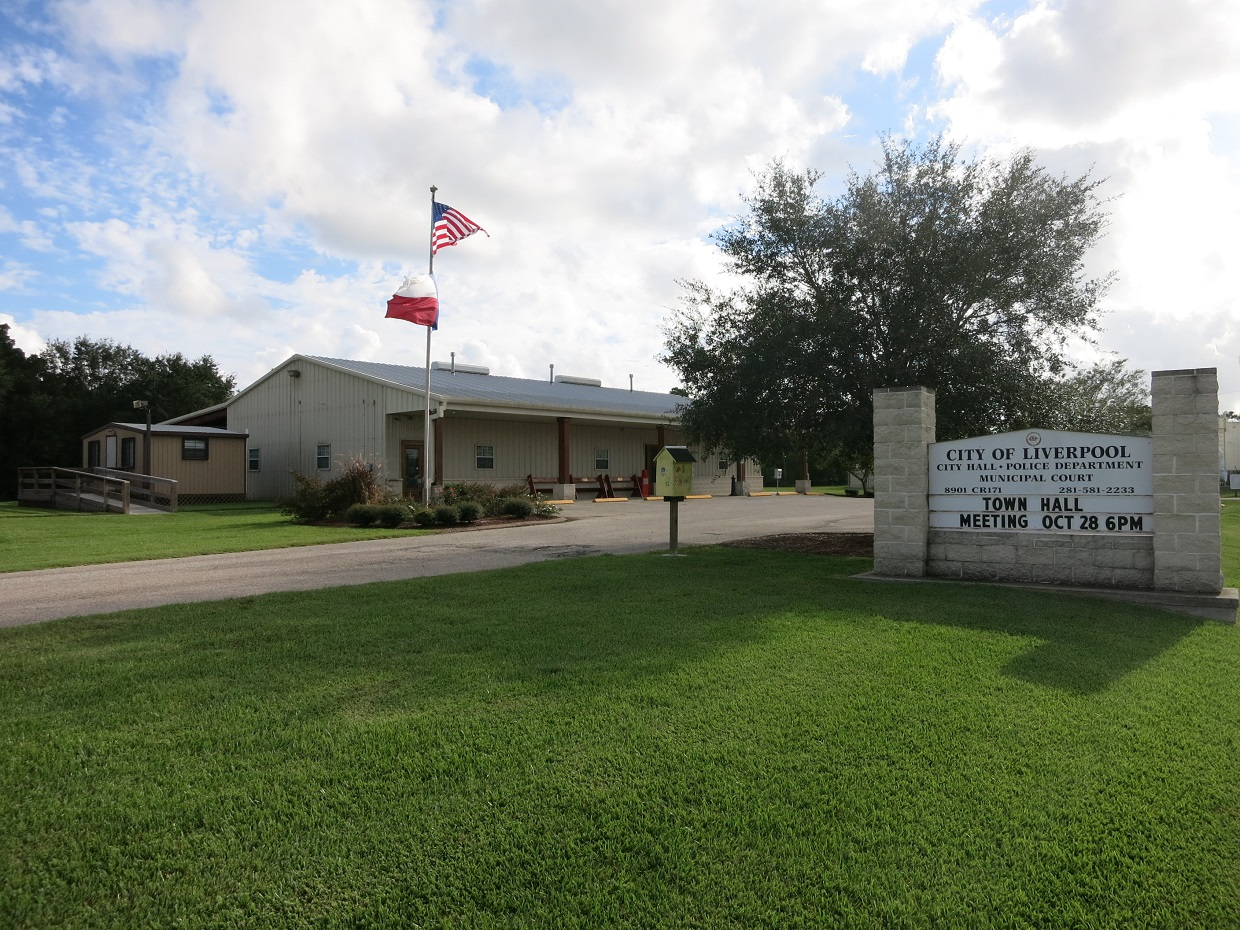
City Hall, Municipal Court, Police Dept.

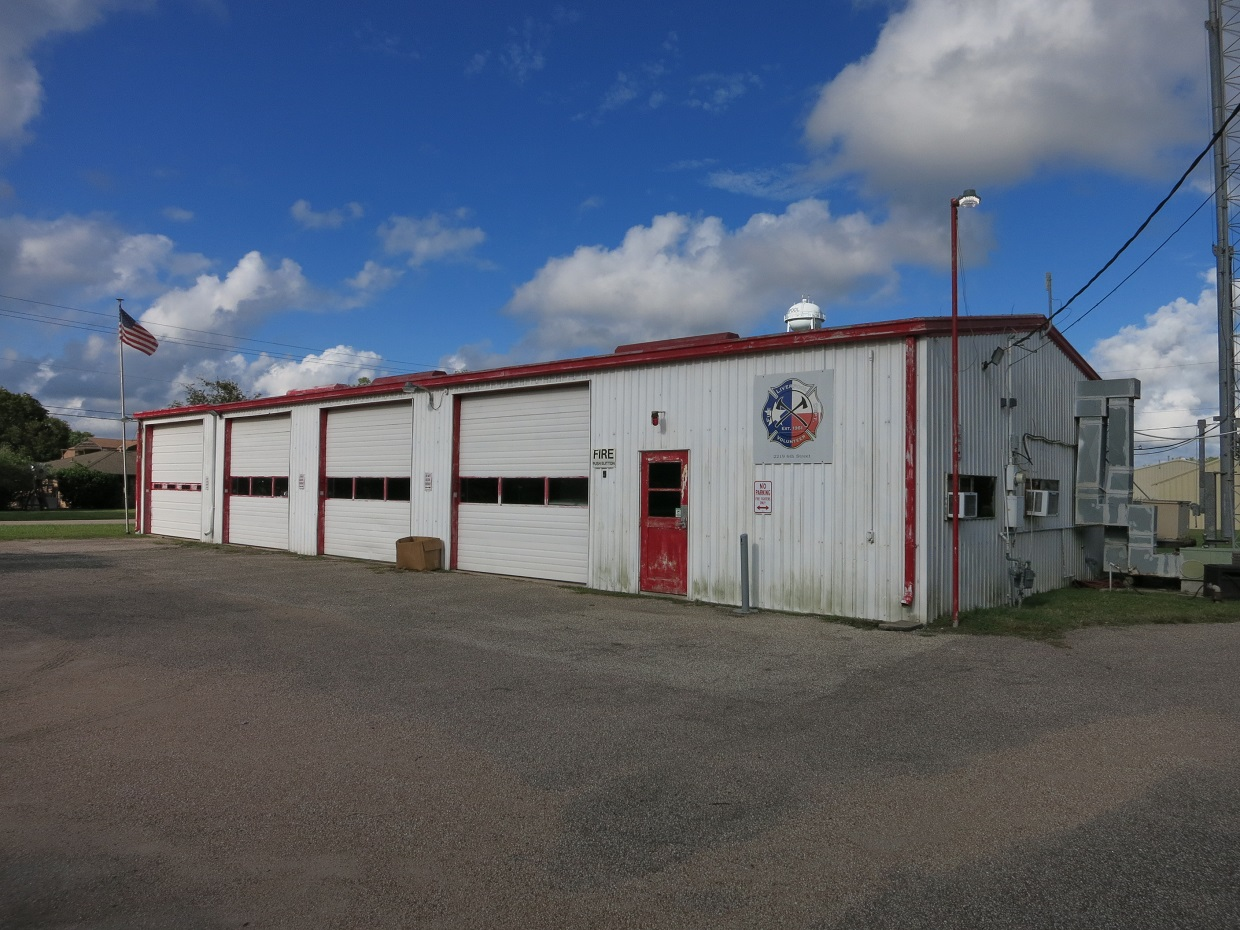
Liverpool Volunteer Fire Dept.

== Education ==
=== Primary and secondary schools ===
==== Public schools ====
Students in Liverpool attend schools in the Alvin Independent School District. It is zoned to Stevenson and Disney Elementary Schools, Alvin Junior High School, and Alvin High School.

=== Colleges and universities ===
Additionally, Alvin Community College, located in nearby Alvin, provides basic undergraduate courses and adult education. Liverpool is in the ACC taxation zone. The Texas Legislature designated Alvin ISD as being in the Alvin CC zone.

== See also ==
- List of municipalities in Texas
