= 2020 in American television =

In American television in 2020, notable events included television show debuts, finales, and cancellations; channel launches, closures, and re-brandings; stations changing or adding their network affiliations; and information about controversies and carriage disputes.

== Awards ==
Category/Organization	78th Golden Globe Awards February 28, 2021	11th Critics' Choice Television Awards March 7, 2021	Producers Guild and Screen Actors Guild Awards March 24–April 4, 2021	73rd Primetime Emmy Awards September 19, 2021
Best Drama Series	The Crown			
Best Comedy Series	Schitt's Creek	Ted Lasso	Schitt's Creek	Ted Lasso
Best Limited Series	The Queen's Gambit			
Best Actor in a Drama Series	Josh O'Connor; The Crown		Jason Bateman; Ozark	Josh O'Connor; The Crown
Best Actress in a Drama Series	Emma Corrin; The Crown		Gillian Anderson; The Crown	Olivia Colman; The Crown
Best Supporting Actor in a Drama Series	—N/a	Michael K. Williams; Lovecraft Country	—N/a	Tobias Menzies; The Crown
Best Supporting Actress in a Drama Series	Gillian Anderson; The Crown		—N/a	Gillian Anderson; The Crown
Best Actor in a Comedy Series	Jason Sudeikis; Ted Lasso			
Best Actress in a Comedy Series	Catherine O'Hara; Schitt's Creek			Jean Smart; Hacks
Best Supporting Actor in a Comedy Series	—N/a	Dan Levy; Schitt's Creek	—N/a	Brett Goldstein; Ted Lasso
Best Supporting Actress in a Comedy Series	—N/a	Hannah Waddingham; Ted Lasso	—N/a	Hannah Waddingham; Ted Lasso
Best Actor in a Limited Series	Mark Ruffalo; I Know This Much Is True	John Boyega; Small Axe	Mark Ruffalo; I Know This Much Is True	Ewan McGregor; Halston
Best Actress in a Limited Series	Anya Taylor-Joy; The Queen's Gambit			Kate Winslet; Mare of Easttown
Best Supporting Actor in a Limited Series	John Boyega; Small Axe	Donald Sutherland; The Undoing	—N/a	Evan Peters; Mare of Easttown
Best Supporting Actress in a Limited Series	—N/a	Uzo Aduba; Mrs. America	—N/a	Julianne Nicholson; Mare of Easttown

== Television shows ==
=== Shows changing networks ===
Show	Moved from	Moved to	Source
Dirty John	Bravo	USA Network	
Vice	HBO	Showtime	
Vice News Tonight	HBO	Vice on TV	
NAACP Image Awards	TV One	BET	
The Family Business	BET	BET+	
Cobra Kai	YouTube Premium	Netflix	
One Day at a Time	Netflix	Pop and TV Land (premieres)/CBS (repeats)	
The Rich Eisen Show	Audience	NBCSN	
Doom Patrol	DC Universe	DC Universe/HBO Max	
Sesame Street	HBO	HBO Max	
Esme & Roy	HBO	HBO Max	
Search Party	TBS	HBO Max	
Summer Camp Island	Cartoon Network	HBO Max	
Infinity Train	Cartoon Network	HBO Max	
Where's Waldo?	Universal Kids	Peacock	
A.P. Bio	NBC	Peacock	
Curious George	PBS Kids	Peacock	
Harry and His Bucket Full of Dinosaurs	Qubo	Peacock	
The Dan Patrick Show	Audience/AT&T SportsNet	Peacock	
Disney's Fairy Tale Weddings	Freeform	Disney+	
Manhunt	Discovery Channel	Spectrum Originals	
Bellator MMA	Paramount Network	CBS Sports Network	
WWE Tribute to the Troops	NBC	Fox	

=== Milestone episodes and anniversaries ===
Show	Network	Episode #	Episode title	Episode airdate	Source
The First 48	A&E	15th Anniversary	"Chain of Death"	January 1	
Survivor	CBS	20th Anniversary	"Survivor at 40: Greatest Moments and Players"	February 5	
Impractical Jokers	TruTV	200th episode	"Hollywood"	February 13	
The Real	First-run syndication	1,000th episode	N/A	February 17	
Supergirl	The CW	100th episode	"It's a Super Life"	February 23	
The Steve Wilkos Show	First-run syndication	2,000th episode	N/A	February 24	
Power Rangers	Nickelodeon	900th episode	"Game On!"	March 7	
Mom	CBS	150th episode	"A Judgy Face and Your Grandma's Drawers"	March 12	
Chicago Med	NBC	100th episode	"The Ghosts of the Past"	March 18	
Curb Your Enthusiasm	HBO	100th episode	"The Spite Store"	March 22	
RuPaul's Drag Race	VH1	150th episode	"Gay's Anatomy"	March 27	
Ben 10	Cartoon Network	150th episode	"Wind Some, Lose Some"	March 29	
Empire	Fox	100th episode	"We Got Us"	April 7	
Modern Family	ABC	250th episode	"Finale Part Two" (series finale)	April 8	
The Blacklist	NBC	150th episode	"Brothers"	May 1	
Full Frontal with Samantha Bee	TBS	150th episode	"May 6, 2020"	May 6	
If Loving You Is Wrong	Oprah Winfrey Network	100th episode	"Taken"	June 2	
The Loud House	Nickelodeon	100th episode	"A Star Is Scorned"	June 10	
The Loud House	Nickelodeon	100th episode	"Senior Moment"	June 11	
Late Night with Seth Meyers	NBC	1,000th episode	Guest: Regina King	June 11	
All That	Nickelodeon	200th episode	"1130" (Jamie Lynn Spears and cast of Zoey 101, New Hope Club)	July 11	
Blindspot	NBC	100th episode	"Iunne Ennui" (series finale)	July 23	
Robot Chicken	Adult Swim	200th episode	"Endgame"	July 26	
Big Brother	CBS	20th Anniversary	Big Brother 22 season premiere	August 5	
The Situation Room with Wolf Blitzer	CNN	15th Anniversary	"August 7, 2020"	August 7	
Last Week Tonight with John Oliver	HBO	200th episode	N/A	August 16	
Family Guy	Fox	350th episode	"Stewie's First Word"	September 27	
The Last Word with Lawrence O'Donnell	MSNBC	10th anniversary	"September 28, 2020"	September 28	
The 100	The CW	100th episode	"The Last War" (series finale)	September 30	
Superstore	NBC	100th episode	"California: Part 2"	November 5	
Bob's Burgers	Fox	200th episode	"Bob Belcher and the Terrible, Horrible, No Good Very Bad Kids"	November 15	
Chicago P.D.	NBC	150th episode	"White Knuckle"	November 18	
Snapped	Oxygen	500th episode	"Dana Flynn"	November 22	
NCIS	CBS	400th episode	"Everything Starts Somewhere"	November 24	
On the Case with Paula Zahn	Investigation Discovery	300th episode	"Crime and Injustice"	November 29	
American Dad!	TBS	300th episode	"Yule. Tide. Repeat"	December 21	
Craig of the Creek	Cartoon Network	100th episode	"Snow Day"	December 31	

=== Shows returning in 2020 ===
The following shows returned with new episodes after being canceled or previously ending their run:

Show	Last aired	Type of return	Previous channel	New/returning/same channel	Return date	Source
Supernanny	2011	Revival	ABC	Lifetime	January 1	
Steve (as Steve on Watch)	2019	Revival	First-run syndication	Facebook Watch	January 6	
Party of Five	2000	Reboot	Fox	Freeform	January 8	
The Biggest Loser	2016	Reboot	NBC	USA Network	January 28	
Manhunt	2017	Revival	Discovery Channel	Spectrum Originals	February 3	
XFL	2001	Reboot	NBC/TNN/UPN	ESPN/ABC/Fox/FS1	February 8	
The Soup	2015	Revival	E!	same	February 12	
Disney's Fairy Tale Weddings	2018	New season	Freeform	Disney+	February 14	
Extreme Makeover: Home Edition	2012	Revival	ABC	HGTV	February 16	
Star Wars: The Clone Wars	2014	New season	Netflix	Disney+	February 21	
Forensic Files (as Forensic Files II)	2011	Revival	Court TV/TruTV	HLN	February 23	
Bride & Prejudice (as Bride & Prejudice: Forbidden Love)	2016	Revival	FYI	Lifetime	February 26	
Opry	2009	New season	GAC	Circle	February 26	
Vice News Tonight	2019	Revival	HBO	Vice on TV	March 4	
Amazing Stories	1987	Reboot	NBC	Apple TV+	March 6	
Cosmos: A Spacetime Odyssey (as Cosmos: Possible Worlds)	2014	New season	Fox/National Geographic	same	March 9	
The Wall	2018	New season	NBC	same	March 15	
One Day at a Time	2019	New season	Netflix	Pop/TV Land/CBS	March 24	
Vice	2018	New season	HBO	Showtime	March 29	
12 oz. Mouse	2018	New season	Adult Swim	same	April 1 (Note: The third season began in regularity on July 21.)	
Singled Out	2019	Reboot	MTV/YouTube	Quibi	April 6	
Punk'd	2015	Reboot	BET	Quibi	April 6	
Celebrity Ghost Stories	2014	Revival	LMN	A&E	April 8	
Who Wants to Be a Millionaire	2019	New season	First-run syndication	ABC	April 8	
Club MTV	1992	Special	MTV	same	April 25	
Parks and Recreation	2015	Special	NBC	same	April 30	
CBS Sunday Movie (as CBS Sunday Night Movies)	2006	Revival	CBS	same	May 3	
Reno 911!	2009	Revival	Comedy Central	Quibi	May 4	
Unbreakable Kimmy Schmidt	2019	Special	Netflix	same	May 12	
Sell This House	2011	Revival	A&E	FYI	May 18	
True Life (as True Life Presents: First-Time First Responders)	2017	Special	MTV	same	June 9	
Search Party	2017	New season	TBS	HBO Max	June 25	
Adventure Time (as Adventure Time: Distant Lands)	2018	Specials	Cartoon Network	HBO Max	June 25	
Nick News	2015	Revival	Nickelodeon	same	June 29	
Unsolved Mysteries	2010	Revival	Spike	Netflix	July 1	
The Baby-Sitters Club	1990	Reboot	HBO	Netflix	July 3	
30 Rock	2013	Special	NBC	same	July 16	
Happy Endings (as Happy Endings Special Charity Event)	2013	Special	ABC	Sony Pictures Television YouTube channel	July 20	
The Fugitive	2001	Reboot	CBS	Quibi	August 3	
Eco-Challenge (as World's Toughest Race: Eco-Challenge Fiji)	2002	Revival	USA Network	Amazon Prime Video	August 14	
Tyler Perry's House of Payne	2012	Revival	TBS	BET	September 2	
A.P. Bio	2019	New season	NBC	Peacock	September 3	
Becoming	2016	Revival	Disney XD	Disney+	September 18	
Way Too Early (as Way Too Early with Kasie Hunt)	2016	Revival	MSNBC	same	September 21	
Dr. 90210	2008	Revival	E!	same	September 28	
Weakest Link	2003	Revival	First-run syndication	NBC	September 29	
16 and Pregnant	2014	Revival	MTV	same	October 6	
The West Wing	2006	Special	NBC	HBO Max	October 15	
Supermarket Sweep	2003	Revival	PAX	ABC	October 18	
MDA Telethon (as The MDA Kevin Hart Kids Telethon)	2014	Revival	ABC	YouTube Live	October 24	
Mickey Mouse (as The Wonderful World of Mickey Mouse)	2019	Revival	Disney Channel	Disney+	November 18	
Animaniacs	1998	Revival	Kids' WB	Hulu	November 20	
I Love New York	2008	Special	VH1	same	November 23	
Hollywood Exes (as Hollywood Exes: Reunited)	2014	Special	VH1	same	November 24	
Saved by the Bell	1993	Revival	NBC	Peacock	November 25	

=== Shows ending in 2020 ===
End date	Show	Channel	First aired	Status	Source
January 1	Messiah	Netflix	2020	Canceled	
January 1	Spinning Out	Netflix	2020	Canceled	
January 10	AJ and the Queen	Netflix	2020	Canceled	
January 10	Harvey Girls Forever!	Netflix	2018	Ended	
January 10	Forky Asks a Question	Disney+	2019	Ended	
January 19	Ray Donovan	Showtime	2013	Canceled	
January 23	Perfect Harmony	NBC	2019	Canceled	
January 23	October Faction	Netflix	2020	Canceled	
January 24	The Ranch	Netflix	2016	Ended	
January 25	Flirty Dancing	Fox	2019	Canceled	
January 26	Star Wars Resistance	Disney Channel/Disney XD	2018	Ended	
January 28	Arrow	The CW	2012	Ended	
January 28	Emergence	ABC	2019	Canceled	
January 29	Next In Fashion	Netflix	2020	Canceled	
January 29	Homicide Hunter	Investigation Discovery	2011	Ended	
January 30	The Good Place	NBC	2016	Ended	
January 30	New Looney Tunes	Boomerang	2015	Ended	
January 31	BoJack Horseman	Netflix	2014	Ended	
February 6	Tell Me a Story	CBS All Access	2018	Canceled	
February 6	Interrogation	CBS All Access	2020	Canceled	
February 9	Power	Starz	2014	Ended	
February 14	High Fidelity	Hulu	2020	Canceled	
February 16	Mike Tyson Mysteries	Adult Swim	2014	Canceled	
February 17	America's Got Talent: The Champions	NBC	2019	Canceled	
February 19	Criminal Minds (returned in 2022 as Criminal Minds: Evolution)	CBS	2005	Ended	
February 21	Fresh Off the Boat	ABC	2015	Ended	
February 22	Almost Family	Fox	2019	Canceled	
February 26	I Am Not Okay with This	Netflix	2020	Canceled	
February 27	Altered Carbon	Netflix	2018	Canceled	
March 1	Rapunzel's Tangled Adventure	Disney Channel	2017	Ended	
March 2	Hardball with Chris Matthews (returned in 2025)	MSNBC	1997	Ended	
March 4	Party of Five	Freeform	2020	Canceled	
March 8	Kidding	Showtime	2018	Canceled	
March 8	Dare Me	USA Network	2019	Canceled	
March 9	Love & Hip Hop: New York	VH1	2011	Canceled	
March 12	Lights Out with David Spade	Comedy Central	2019	Canceled	
March 12	Carol's Second Act	CBS	2019	Canceled	
March 12	In the Room	E!	2019	Canceled	
March 12	Pop of the Morning	E!	2020	Canceled	
March 13	Lincoln Rhyme: Hunt for the Bone Collector	NBC	2020	Canceled	
March 14	Trish Regan Primetime	Fox Business	2015	Canceled	
March 18	68 Whiskey	Paramount Network	2020	Canceled	
March 19	Very Cavallari	E!	2018	Ended	
March 21	Henry Danger	Nickelodeon	2014	Ended	
March 24	Project Blue Book	History	2019	Canceled	
March 25	Stumptown	ABC	2019	Canceled	
March 26	Deputy	Fox	2020	Canceled	
March 26	Outmatched	Fox	2020	Canceled	
March 27	High Noon	ESPN	2018	Canceled	
April 1	The Magicians	Syfy	2015	Ended	
April 3	Future Man	Hulu	2017	Ended	
April 3	Hawaii Five-0	CBS	2010	Ended	
April 3	High Maintenance	HBO	2016	Canceled	
April 5	Extreme Makeover: Home Edition (returned in 2025 on ABC)	HGTV	2003	Canceled	
April 7	Schitt's Creek	Pop	2015	Ended	
April 8	Modern Family	ABC	2009	Ended	
April 12	Barbie Dreamhouse Adventures	Netflix	2018	Ended	
April 13	Briarpatch	USA Network	2020	Canceled	
April 16	Wife Swap	Paramount Network	2004	Canceled	
April 16	Indebted	NBC	2020	Canceled	
April 17	blackAF	Netflix	2020	Canceled	
April 17	Strike Back	Cinemax	2011	Ended	
April 18	Doc McStuffins	Disney Jr.	2012	Ended	
April 20	The Midnight Gospel	Netflix	2020	Canceled	
April 20	Cosmos: Possible Worlds	National Geographic	2020	Canceled	
April 21	Empire	Fox	2015	Ended	
April 23	Will & Grace	NBC	1998	Ended	
April 24	Sister Circle	TV One/Tegna O&Os	2017	Canceled	
April 26	God Friended Me	CBS	2018	Canceled	
April 26	Homeland	Showtime	2011	Ended	
April 29	Boomerang	BET	2019	Canceled	
May 4	Star Wars: The Clone Wars	Disney+	2008	Ended	
May 5	Bless This Mess	ABC	2019	Canceled	
May 6	Brockmire	IFC	2017	Ended	
May 7	Tommy	CBS	2020	Canceled	
May 8	The Hollow	Netflix	2018	Canceled	
May 11	Cops (returned in 2021)	Paramount Network	1989	Canceled	
May 13	Single Parents	ABC	2018	Canceled	
May 13	Schooled	ABC	2019	Canceled	
May 14	Katy Keene	The CW	2020	Canceled	
May 14	How to Get Away with Murder	ABC	2014	Ended	
May 15	She-Ra and the Princesses of Power	Netflix	2018	Ended	
May 23	Live PD	A&E	2016	Canceled	
May 24	Run	HBO	2020	Canceled	
May 24	Little Big Shots	NBC	2016	Canceled	
May 28	Siren	Freeform	2018	Canceled	
May 31	Vida	Starz	2018	Ended	
June 1	The Baker and the Beauty	ABC	2020	Canceled	
June 2	Fuller House	Netflix	2016	Ended	
June 4	Vagrant Queen	Syfy	2020	Canceled	
June 5	13 Reasons Why	Netflix	2017	Ended	
June 7	Transformers: Cyberverse	Cartoon Network	2018	Ended	
June 11	Man with a Plan	CBS	2016	Canceled	
June 15	Dinosaur Train (returned in 2021 as Dinosaur Train: Adventure Island)	PBS Kids	2009	Ended	
June 15	Alexa & Katie	Netflix	2018	Ended	
June 16	If Loving You Is Wrong	Oprah Winfrey Network	2014	Ended	
June 16	One Day at a Time	Pop	2017	Canceled	
June 16	WWE Backstage	Fox Sports 1	2019	Canceled	
June 18	The Order	Netflix	2019	Canceled	
June 19	Live PD: Police Patrol	First-run syndication	2017	Canceled	
June 25	The Twilight Zone	CBS All Access	2019	Canceled	
June 25	Broke	CBS	2020	Canceled	
June 26	The Will Cain Show	ESPNews	2018	Ended	
June 28	Patriot Act with Hasan Minhaj	Netflix	2018	Canceled	
June 28	Penny Dreadful: City of Angels	Showtime	2020	Canceled	
July 2	Council of Dads	NBC	2020	Canceled	
July 3	DC Daily	DC Universe	2018	Canceled	
July 15	Brave New World	Peacock	2020	Canceled	
July 16	Labor of Love	Fox	2020	Canceled	
July 17	Cursed	Netflix	2020	Canceled	
July 22	Game On!	CBS	2020	Canceled	
July 23	Blindspot	NBC	2015	Ended	
July 25	The Rocketeer	Disney Jr.	2019	Canceled	
July 28	Last Chance U	Netflix	2016	Ended	
July 29	At Home with Amy Sedaris	TruTV	2017	Canceled	
July 31	12 oz. Mouse	Adult Swim	2005	Canceled	
August 7	Rise of the Teenage Mutant Ninja Turtles	Nicktoons	2018	Canceled	
August 11	Greenleaf	Oprah Winfrey Network	2016	Ended	
August 12	Agents of S.H.I.E.L.D.	ABC	2013	Ended	
August 12	World of Dance	NBC	2017	Canceled	
August 13	Don't	ABC	2020	Canceled	
August 14	Teenage Bounty Hunters	Netflix	2020	Canceled	
August 17	Glitch Techs	Netflix	2020	Ended	
August 21	Hoops	Netflix	2020	Canceled	
August 21	Little Voice	Apple TV+	2020	Canceled	
August 23	Elena of Avalor	Disney Jr.	2016	Ended	
August 23	NOS4A2	AMC	2019	Canceled	
August 25	Trinkets	Netflix	2019	Ended	
August 26	Corporate	Comedy Central	2018	Ended	
August 26	United We Fall	ABC	2020	Canceled	
August 27	Unikitty!	Cartoon Network	2017	Ended	
September 4	Spirit Riding Free	Netflix	2017	Ended	
September 4	Away	Netflix	2020	Canceled	
September 9	L.A.'s Finest	Spectrum Originals	2019	Canceled	
September 10	Julie and the Phantoms	Netflix	2020	Canceled	
September 11	The Duchess	Netflix	2020	Canceled	
September 11	Coop & Cami Ask the World	Disney Channel	2018	Canceled	
September 13	Kasie DC	MSNBC	2017	Canceled	
September 18	Ratched	Netflix	2020	Canceled	
September 25	Utopia	Amazon Prime Video	2020	Canceled	
September 29	Returning the Favor	Facebook Watch	2017	Canceled	
September 30	The 100	The CW	2014	Ended	
October 9	Room 104	HBO	2017	Ended	
October 9	The Haunting	Netflix	2018	Ended	
October 12	Kipo and the Age of Wonderbeasts	Netflix	2020	Ended	
October 16	Grand Army	Netflix	2020	Canceled	
October 16	Helstrom	Hulu	2020	Canceled	
October 18	Lovecraft Country	HBO	2020	Canceled	
October 18	The Soup	E!	2004	Canceled	
October 29	Politicking with Larry King	Ora TV/Hulu/RT America	2013	Ended	
October 31	Group Chat	Nickelodeon	2020	Ended	
November 1	Butterbean's Café	Nick Jr. Channel	2018	Ended	
November 5	Powerbirds	Universal Kids	2020	Ended	
November 10	Dash & Lily	Netflix	2020	Canceled	
November 16	Connecting	NBC.com/Peacock	2020	Canceled	
November 17	The Boss Baby: Back in Business	Netflix	2018	Ended	
November 19	Supernatural	The CW	2005	Ended	
November 20	The Pack	Amazon Prime Video	2020	Canceled	
November 20	The Right Stuff	Disney+	2020	Canceled	
November 24	Tosh.0	Comedy Central	2009	Canceled	
November 30	Filthy Rich	Fox	2020	Canceled	
December 4	Disney Fam Jam	Disney Channel	2020	Ended	
December 5	ThunderCats Roar	Cartoon Network	2020	Canceled	
December 8	Mr. Iglesias	Netflix	2019	Canceled	
December 9	The Big Show Show	Netflix	2020	Canceled	
December 9	The Expanding Universe of Ashley Garcia	Netflix	2020	Canceled	
December 13	Pandora	The CW	2019	Canceled	
December 17	All That	Nickelodeon	1994	Ended	
December 22	Next	Fox	2020	Canceled	
December 29	Don't Be Tardy	Bravo	2012	Canceled	
December 30	Vikings	Amazon Prime Video	2013	Ended	
December 31	Chilling Adventures of Sabrina	Netflix	2018	Canceled	
December 31	NBC's New Year's Eve	NBC	2004	Ended	

=== Entering syndication in 2020 ===
A list of programs (current or canceled) that have accumulated enough episodes (between 65 and 100) or seasons (three or more) to be eligible for off-network syndication and/or basic cable runs.

Show	Seasons	In Production	Notes	Source
Schitt's Creek	6	No		

== Networks and services ==
=== Launches ===
Network	Type	Launch date	Notes	Source
Circle	Over-the-air multicast/ OTT streaming	January 1	Circle, which focused on country music and its related lifestyle, was a Nashville-based venture between Gray Television and the Opry Entertainment division of Ryman Hospitality Properties. It was Gray's first owned entry into the multicast arena, while it brings Ryman (formerly Gaylord Entertainment) back to television network ownership after it sold cable's The Nashville Network and Country Music Television to CBS in 1997. Gray and CBS-owned stations form the major launch groups for Circle, whose schedule includes the return of the weekly Grand Ole Opry broadcast to television. The network has a limited group of affiliates which exclusively carry the Opry on their main channel as a tape-delayed offering on late Saturday nights, due to lack of room for the full subchannel.	
Yahoo! Finance	Cable (via Verizon FiOS)/ OTT streaming	January 27	Verizon Media extends its Yahoo Finance business and financial news website into a 24-hour linear news channel initially available on Verizon FiOS channel 604, serving as a competitor to CNBC, Fox Business and Cheddar; Yahoo Finance's bell-to-bell stock market programming is also streamed live from 9:00 a.m.-5:00 p.m. ET on the site's webpage.	
Black News Channel	Cable and digital	February 10	Founded by former Oklahoma U.S. Representative J. C. Watts, the network devoted itself to covering the African American community in news, sports and entertainment.	
Marquee Sports Network	Cable and digital	February 22 (on-air launch); July 24 (full launch)	A regional sports network venture between Sinclair Broadcast Group and Major League Baseball's Chicago Cubs, Marquee becomes the team's exclusive primary broadcaster from NBC Sports Chicago, WGN-TV and WLS-TV, along with surrounding team programming and other sports content. The launch was tied to the start of the team's spring training, but full operations did not start until the COVID-19 delayed Cubs season started on July 24; that day also saw a situation averted where the Chicago market's major cable provider, Xfinity (which is owned by Comcast, the owners of NBC Sports Chicago), agreed to terms to carry the network.	
Quibi	OTT streaming	April 6		
Peacock	OTT streaming	April 15 (Xfinity subscribers); July 15 (full launch)	Peacock is an ad-supported companion service to NBC with exclusive and original content. The service has three tiers; a free tier, a premium tier which is available to both paid subscribers or those who subscribe to an offered cable service such as Xfinity, and a near-fully ad-free option for extra cost. The company concurrently retains its 30% stake in Hulu.	
LX	Over-the-air multicast/ OTT streaming	May 19	Announced by NBCUniversal Owned Television Stations on September 23, 2019, LX (an abbreviation for Local X, and adapted from the name of its sister lifestyle production subsidiary LXTV) is a digital news service building on experimental news offerings and research by NBCUniversal-owned stations available through a streaming service and over-the-air multicast network, providing original local news content aimed at young adults 18–45 who traditionally do not watch news on conventional television. (LX originally began providing news content via a dedicated website and on various social media networks such as YouTube on the date of the launch announcement.) While the broadcast version based out of the Dallas–Fort Worth duopoly of NBC O&O KXAS-TV and Telemundo O&O KXTX-TV, which produces three-hour daily morning and prime time newscasts for LX ad-supported, commercial breaks on LX are fewer and of shorter length than other conventional television platforms.	
HBO Max	OTT streaming	May 27	HBO Max is a paid subscription streaming service that features original content as well as content from Warner Bros., New Line Cinema, CNN, TNT, TBS, Cartoon Network, Crunchyroll and other WarnerMedia brands and programs being transferred from HBO (consisting of children's programs from the Sesame Workshop library) and Audience, which shut down several days before HBO Max launched, along with former original programming from the DC Universe service, which wss converted to a comic book archive-centric service. Due to compensation disputes, the service was unavailable on Amazon Fire TV and Roku digital media players and televisions until November 17 and December 17, respectively. HBO Max replaced HBO Go (TV Everywhere) and HBO Now (direct-to-consumer OTT), two standalone streaming services that exclusively featured HBO content (including current and library original programming, and films broadcast on HBO's linear primary and multiplex channels during their contractual durations).	
Fave TV	Over-the-air multicast	December 15	Launched by CBS Entertainment Group, a subsidiary of ViacomCBS. The network's programming is mostly taken from the program archives of ViacomCBS's non-children's networks, along with carrying repeat syndicated sitcoms also carried by networks such as MTV2, BET and Logo TV.	

=== Conversions and rebrandings ===
Old network name	New network name	Type	Conversion date	Notes	Source
JUCE TV	Positiv	Over-the-air multicast/ Cable and satellite	January 26	On January 26, the Trinity Broadcasting Network relaunched its youth-oriented multicast service JUCE TV, which had been moved to a 24-hour DT5 feed on TBN's owned-and-operated stations on January 1, after being placed in a time-share with sister children's network Smile concurrent with the June 2015 launch of TBN Salsa on that feed, as Positiv. The relaunched network, which, unusual for a service whose over-the-air broadcasts are transmitted exclusively over non-commercial stations, is partially ad-supported, features family and faith-based films (including many in TBN's existing library that aired on the network under its JCTV/JUCE TV format). TBN continued to use the "JUCE" brand in a dedicated YouTube channel offering original short-form content aimed at Christian youth, which the ministry launched on October 23, 2019.	
Live Well Network	Localish	Over-the-air multicast	February 17	On January 21, ABC Owned Television Stations announced that Live Well Network, which has been carried exclusively on ABC's eight O&O stations since it retracted from national distribution in 2014, rebranded on February 17, as a television extension of the Localish digital lifestyle brand launched by ABC in September 2018. The relaunched network features long-form variants of several programs already featured on the Localish website, which focuses on short-form series focusing on local storytelling, food, leisure and health. It also serves as a de facto overflow feed for ABC's network programming on its O&Os during sports and breaking news coverage.	
Showtime Beyond	SHO×BET	Premium cable and satellite	July 15	On February 20, ViacomCBS announced that Showtime's third multiplex channel, the former channel space for Showcase, which, since its July 2001 rebranding, has focused on theatrical and first-run feature films from parent network Showtime's various film distributors as well as Showtime's library of original made-for-cable films, documentaries and comedy specials, would be relaunched as SHO×BET, an African American-oriented service co-branded with sister basic cable network BET. Upon the July 15 relaunch, however, SHO×BET replaced sister multiplex channel Showtime Beyond, which had focused mainly around paranormal and science fiction films since its September 1999 launch, instead, while Showcase remained a standalone channel. (Both networks swapped channel placements on select systems.) SHO×BET, the second premium cable co-branding effort to have involved BET, former co-owner of Starz multiplex channel BET Movies: Starz! (now Starz In Black) from its 1997 launch until Viacom opted BET Networks out of the venture in 2001, offers movies and series (including original scripted content from Showtime and BET's respective libraries) aimed at Black audiences.	
Justice Network	True Crime Network	Over-the-air multicast	July 27	Announced on July 13, the Tegna-owned multicast network rebranded as True Crime Network on July 27, in preparation for the launch of a free companion OTT streaming service offering true crime series from the network's programming library and true crime podcasts distributed by co-owned subsidiary Vault Studios to launch later in the summer. Along with its existing archive programming, True Crime Network also offers original programming based on true crime and investigative content from the libraries of Tegna's television stations as well as the safety PSAs from the "BeSafe" campaign (hosted by Atlanta Police Sergeant and former actor Ralph Woolfolk) that have aired since the network first launched.	
Spectrum News Austin	Spectrum News 1 (Texas)	Regional cable	October 16	On October 6, Charter Communications announced the relaunch of regional cable news channel Spectrum News Austin, which launched in September 1999, and added a subfeed for the San Antonio market in June 2014, as Spectrum News 1, a quasi-statewide network serving all eight of the provider's systems throughout Texas, on October 16. In addition to its existing staff in Austin and San Antonio, Spectrum News 1 employs around 20 additional reporters assigned to file reports in each of the six new markets: Dallas–Fort Worth, Wichita Falls, El Paso, Corpus Christi, Waco and Harlingen–McAllen–Brownsville.	

=== Closures ===
Network	Type	End date	Notes	Source
ESPN Goal Line & Bases Loaded	Cable and satellite	January 13 (de facto); June 30 (formal closure)	On March 13, one day after the NCAA cancelled its Division I baseball tournament due to the COVID-19 pandemic, ESPN sent notice to cable and satellite providers that Goal Line & Bases Loaded would be formally discontinued on June 30, the contractual end of its latest agreement. The NFL RedZone-style channel carried live highlight coverage of college football across ESPN's networks, along with similar coverage of the NCAA softball and baseball tourneys (and until 2017, Wednesday night college basketball coverage under the "Buzzer Beater" branding). ESPN's building emphasis on its ESPN+ streaming service, along with continuous staffing reductions at ESPN and overall issues with a lack of compelling coverage on the channel, are likely to blame for the network's closure. The channel's final program was a "datacast" of the 2020 College Football Playoff National Championship (as part of ESPN's Megacast coverage of the game); from March 13 until its closure, the channel space carried a looping video of the ESPN logo.	
MHz WorldView	Over-the-air multicast	March 1	MHz Networks announced on January 8, 2020, that MHz Worldview would close as they prepare to transition to two digital streaming services, MHz Choice (paid subscription) and MHz Now (free and ad-supported). After its closure, many stations that carried MHz Worldview switched to other networks including First Nations Experience, World Channel, Deutsche Welle, and NHK World.	
Audience	Cable/satellite (DirecTV/U-verse/AT&T TV-exclusive)	May 23	AT&T announced on January 8 that Audience, a network exclusive to AT&T platforms, would close, eventually transitioning to a barker channel that advertises and previews programming found on HBO Max. The prime daily programs for Audience, simulcasts of sports radio programs hosted by Dan Patrick and Rich Eisen, ended on the network on February 28.	
HBO Go	TV Everywhere video on demand streaming service	July 31	On June 12, 2020, WarnerMedia announced that the HBO Go platform would be discontinued on July 31, 2020. Providers that had not yet made an HBO Max deal continued to allow customer access to HBO Go (mainly Altice USA's brands, Mediacom and smaller cable providers yet to come to terms with WarnerMedia on HBO Max carriage, and closed-circuit university television systems which had not had personnel available during the COVID-19 pandemic to negotiate a new contract for HBO Max), though only through the HBO Go desktop website.	
Quibi	OTT streaming	December 1	Only having launched in April, it was reported on October 21, 2020, that Quibi would be shutting down. This was after the short-form streamer made numerous accessibility concessions having launched with a mobile only focus. Its library would be acquired by The Roku Channel in January 2021.	
HBO Now	OTT streaming	December 17	On December 16, WarnerMedia reached an agreement with Roku to offer HBO Max beginning the following day on digital media players and television sets supporting Roku's operating systems, effectively closing HBO Now (which, like with HBO Go shutting down in contrast to the more expansive HBO Max, narrowly focused on content from the linear HBO television service). The shutdown of HBO Now (which was renamed as simply "HBO" on August 1) completed WarnerMedia's discontinuation of HBO Now and HBO Go, which began with the replacement of apps for both legacy services with those of HBO Max on iOS and Android platforms upon the latter's May 27 launch.	
El Rey Network	Cable and digital	December 31	Following carriage disputes on AT&T's platforms and Spectrum systems, as well as Univision Communications's withdrawal as a minority partner as part of their own corporate upheaval, the English-language Latino-oriented channel announced on December 8 that it would shutter as a linear cable/satellite channel. However, the network relaunched as a streaming service in August 2021.	

== Television stations ==
=== Subchannel launches ===
Date	Market	Station	Channel	Affiliation	Source
January 1	Birmingham, Alabama	WBRC	6.5	Grit (moved from 6.3)	
January 1	Huntsville, Alabama	WAFF	48.5	Grit (moved from 48.3)	
January 1	Montgomery, Alabama	WSFA	12.3	Circle	
January 1	Anchorage, Alaska	KTUU-TV	2.3	Circle	
January 1	Tucson, Arizona	KOLD-TV	13.3	Circle	
January 1	Los Angeles, California	KCAL-TV	9.3	Circle	
January 1	Sacramento, California	KMAX-TV	31.5	Circle	
January 1	San Francisco, California	KBCW	44.5	Circle	
January 1	Dover, Delaware (Salisbury, Maryland)	WMDE	36.4	Circle	
January 1	Gainesville/Ocala, Florida,	WCJB-TV	20.4	Circle	
January 1	Miami/Fort Lauderdale, Florida,	WBFS-TV	33.5	Circle	
January 1	Panama City, Florida,	WECP-LD	18.4	Heroes & Icons (moved from 18.3)	
January 1	Sarasota, Florida,	WWSB	40.2	Circle	
January 1	St. Petersburg/Tampa, Florida,	WTOG	44.5	Circle	
January 1	West Palm Beach, Florida,	WFLX	29.3	Circle	
January 1	Albany, Georgia,	WALB	10.5	Circle	
January 1	Albany, Georgia,	WGCW-LD	36.2	Circle	
January 1	Augusta, Georgia,	WRDW-TV	12.4	Circle	
January 1	Columbus, Georgia,	WTVM	9.3	Circle	
January 1	Savannah, Georgia,	WTOC-TV	11.3	Circle	
January 1	Thomasville, Georgia (Tallahassee, Florida)	WCTV	6.3	Circle	
January 1	Honolulu, Hawaii	KGMB	5.2	Circle	
January 1	Caldwell/Boise, Idaho	KNIN-TV	9.4	Circle	
January 1	Evansville, Indiana	WFIE	14.4	Grit (moved from 14.3)	
January 1	South Bend, Indiana	WNDU-TV	16.3	Circle	
January 1	Cedar Rapids, Iowa	KCRG-TV	9.6	Circle	
January 1	Ottumwa, Iowa/Kirksville, Missouri	KYOU-TV	15.5	Grit (moved from 15.3)	
January 1	Topeka, Kansas	WIBW-TV	13.3	Circle	
January 1	Hutchinson/Wichita, Kansas	KWCH-DT	12.4	Circle	
January 1	Hazard, Kentucky,	WYMT-TV	57.3	Circle	
January 1	Lexington, Kentucky,	WKYT-TV	27.3	Circle	
January 1	Louisville, Kentucky,	WAVE	3.3	Circle	
January 1	Baton Rouge, Louisiana,	WAFB	9.3	Circle	
January 1	New Orleans, Louisiana,	WVUE-DT	8.5	Grit (moved from 8.3)	
January 1	Shreveport, Louisiana,	KSLA	12.2	Grit (moved from 12.4)	
January 1	Bangor, Maine	WABI-TV	5.4	Circle	
January 1	Boston, Massachusetts	WSBK-TV	38.5	Circle	
January 1	Detroit, Michigan,	WKBD-TV	50.5	Circle	
January 1	Flint/Saginaw/ Bay City, Michigan,	WJRT-TV	12.6	WeatherNation TV (moved from 12.3)	
January 1	Onondaga/Lansing, Michigan,	WILX-TV	10.3	Circle	
January 1	Jackson, Mississippi,	WLBT	3.3	Circle	
January 1	Cape Girardeau, Missouri/ Paducah, Kentucky,	KFVS-TV	12.3	Circle	
January 1	Springfield, Missouri	KYTV	3.5	Circle	
January 1	Grand Island/Hastings, Nebraska,	KGIN	11.5	Circle	
January 1	Lincoln, Nebraska,	KOLN	10.5	Circle	
January 1	Reno, Nevada	KOLO-TV	8.4	Circle	
January 1	Secaucus, New Jersey (New York City)	WWOR-TV	48.2	Circle	
January 1	Riverhead, New York (New York City)	WLNY-TV	55.5	Circle	
January 1	Charlotte, North Carolina,	WBTV	3.3	Circle	
January 1	Greenville/New Bern/ Washington, North Carolina,	WITN-TV	7.6	Circle	
January 1	Wilmington, North Carolina,	WECT	6.3	Circle	
January 1	Bismarck, North Dakota	KFYR-TV	5.4	Circle	
January 1	Dickinson, North Dakota	KQCD-TV	7.4	Circle	
January 1	Minot, North Dakota	KMOT	10.4	Circle	
January 1	Williston, North Dakota	KUMV-TV	8.4	Circle	
January 1	Cincinnati, Ohio,	WCPO-TV	9.5	Laff	
January 1	Cincinnati, Ohio,	WXIX-TV	19.5	Ion Television	
January 1	Shaker Heights/Cleveland, Ohio,	WUAB	43.2	Circle	
January 1	Toledo, Ohio,	WTVG	13.4	Circle	
January 1	Philadelphia, Pennsylvania	WPSG	57.5	Circle	
January 1	Jeannette/Pittsburgh, Pennsylvania	WPCW	19.5	Circle	
January 1	Ponce, Puerto Rico	WTIN-TV	2.11	Telemundo	
January 1	Mayaguez, Puerto Rico	WNJX-TV	2.12	Telemundo	
January 1	San Juan, Puerto Rico	WAPA-TV	4.3	Local weather	
January 1	Charleston, South Carolina,	WCSC-TV	5.4	Grit (moved from 5.3)	
January 1	Columbia, South Carolina,	WIS	10.3	Circle	
January 1	Myrtle Beach, South Carolina,	WMBF-TV	32.5	Grit (moved from 32.3)	
January 1	Lead, South Dakota	KHSD-TV	11.2	Circle	
January 1	Rapid City, South Dakota	KOTA-TV	3.2	Circle	
January 1	Knoxville, Tennessee,	WVLT-TV	8.4	Circle	
January 1	Memphis, Tennessee,	WMC-TV	5.4	Grit (moved from 5.3)	
January 1	Borger/Amarillo, Texas,	KEYU	31.3	Circle	
January 1	Fort Worth/Dallas, Texas,	KTXA	21.4	Circle	
January 1	Lubbock, Texas,	KCBD	11.2	Circle	
January 1	Tyler/Longview, Texas,	KLTV	7.2	Circle	
January 1	Burlington, Vermont	WCAX-TV	3.5	Ion Television (moved from 3.3)	
January 1	Harrisonburg, Virginia,	WSVW-LD	30.3	Circle	
January 1	Richmond, Virginia,	WWBT	12.4	Court TV Mystery (moved from 12.3)	
January 1	Roanoke, Virginia,	WDBJ	7.3	Heroes & Icons (moved from 7.2)	
January 1	Tacoma/Seattle, Washington	KSTW	11.5	Circle	
January 1	Huntington/Charleston, West Virginia	WSAZ-TV	3.3	Circle	
January 1	Weston/Clarksburg, West Virginia	WDTV	5.4	Circle	
January 1	Green Bay, Wisconsin	WBAY-TV	2.6	Ion Television (moved from 2.3)	
January 6	Colorado Springs, Colorado	KKTV	11.3	Circle	
January 7	Fort Kent, Maine (Presque Isle)	WWPI-LD	16.1	NBC	
January 13	Lake Charles, Louisiana,	KVHP	29.4	Ion Television (moved from 29.3)	
January 13	Wichita Falls, Texas/Lawton, Oklahoma	KAUZ-TV	6.3	Circle	
April 1	Lafayette, Louisiana,	KLWB	50.3	Telemundo	
May 1	Kennewick/Pasco/ Richland, Washington	KVEW	42.6	QVC	
May 1	Kennewick/Pasco/ Richland, Washington	KVEW	42.7	HSN	
May 1	Yakima, Washington	KAPP	35.6	QVC	
May 1	Yakima, Washington	KAPP	35.7	HSN	

=== Stations changing network affiliation ===
==== Major affiliation changes ====
This section outlines affiliation changes involving English and Spanish language networks (ABC, NBC, CBS, Fox, PBS, The CW, Univision, etc.), and format conversions involving independent stations. Digital subchannels will only be mentioned if the prior or new affiliation involves a major English and Spanish broadcast network or a locally programmed independent entertainment format.

Date	Market	Station	Channel	Prior affiliation	New affiliation	Notes	Source
January 1	Mayagüez, Puerto Rico	WORA	5.1	Telemundo	ABC	On June 27, 2019, WORA-TV announced that it would end an affiliation agreement with WKAQ-TV by December 31, leaving Telemundo without a western affiliate after more than four years. Later, Hemisphere Media Group, the owners of WAPA-TV, announced that Telemundo would air on a subchannel of WNJX-TV by January 1, 2020. On December 18, WORA-TV announced that it would move ABC programming to channel 5.1 on January 1, with the Televisión Española news channel 24H airing on 5.2 from that date on.	
January 28	Harlingen/McAllen/ Brownsville, Texas	KGBT-TV	4.1	CBS	Temporarily silent	With Nexstar Media Group acquiring the non-license assets of KGBT from Sinclair Broadcast Group through the settlement of Tribune Media's 2018 lawsuit against Sinclair, Nexstar—which assumed the rights to KGBT's programming and news operation—decides to move KGBT's CBS schedule to a subchannel on the KVEO spectrum; the move results in KGBT ending its affiliation with CBS after 66 years and its main channel going temporarily silent until replacement programming is added. KVEO's former subchannel affiliations with Estrella TV, Court TV Mystery and Grit also move to the KGBT spectrum (on three new subchannels) to accommodate additional bandwidth needed for KVEO to transmit the former KGBT CBS programming feed on its DT2 subchannel.	
January 28	Harlingen/McAllen/ Brownsville, Texas	KGBT-TV	4.4	New subchannel	Estrella TV		
January 28	Harlingen/McAllen/ Brownsville, Texas	KGBT-TV	4.5	New subchannel	Grit		
January 28	Harlingen/McAllen/ Brownsville, Texas	KGBT-TV	4.6	New subchannel	Court TV Mystery		
January 28	Harlingen/McAllen/ Brownsville, Texas	KVEO-TV	23.2	Estrella TV	CBS		
July 31	Anchorage, Alaska	KYES-TV	5.1	MyNetworkTV	CBS	Earlier in 2020, GCI/Denali Media Holdings, the majority cable provider for the state of Alaska, announced that it would sell its broadcast holdings to focus on other areas, in particular providing data, mobile, video, voice and managed services. On July 31, Denali announced the sale of KTVA's non-license assets, including its news operation and CBS affiliation, to Gray Television, owners of NBC affiliate KTUU-TV and what had been MyNetworkTV affiliate KYES-TV. Denali retains ownership of the KTVA license since Gray cannot legally own and/or operate the station (it already owns two full-power stations in Anchorage). The KTVA assets were transferred to KYES-TV the same day, while KTVA temporarily simulcasted KYES-TV for the benefit of viewers until it wound down its news operation on August 28, with KTUU taking some of KTVA's former staff for a combined "Alaska's News Source" operation between KTUU and KYES. KYES's former primary schedule and MyNetworkTV schedule was shifted to a newly created fourth subchannel. KTVA went dark on September 3, 2020, as GCI looks for a sale partner.	
July 31	Anchorage, Alaska	KYES-TV	5.4	New subchannel	MyNetworkTV		
July 31	Anchorage, Alaska	KTVA	11.1	CBS	Dark		
November 2	Sioux Falls, South Dakota	KDLT-TV	46.2	Antenna TV	Fox	Earlier in September, Independent Communications, owner of KTTW and its Huron satellite station KTTM announced it sell the non-license assets of the station along with the studio space, its translators, the Fox affiliation and the Cozi TV subchannel to Gray Television, parent of NBC affiliated station KDLT-TV and its Mitchell satellite station KDLV and ABC affiliated station KSFY-TV; ending its 33 years affiliation with the network on November 2. After the sale, a local company plans to buy the stations and they carry This TV on the second subchannel for the interim while the main channel went temporary dark (Later on February 11, 2021, Radiant Life Ministries, parent company of the Christian broadcaster TCT Network brought the stations for $1 million, pending FCC sale). To accompany the Fox and Cozi TV programming, KDLT had moved the Antenna TV subchannel to 46.3 and KDLV meanwhile moves the KSFY signal to 5.3, displacing The CW Plus and MeTV affiliations.	
November 2	Sioux Falls, South Dakota	KDLT-TV	46.3	New subchannel	Antenna TV		
November 2	Sioux Falls, South Dakota	KDLT-TV	46.4	New subchannel	Cozi TV		
November 2	Sioux Falls, South Dakota	KTTW	7.1	Fox	Dark		
November 2	Sioux Falls, South Dakota	KTTW	7.2	Cozi TV	This TV (moved from 7.3)		
November 2	Mitchell, South Dakota	KDLV (satellite of KDLT-TV)	5.2	The CW Plus	Fox		
November 2	Mitchell, South Dakota	KDLV (satellite of KDLT-TV)	5.3	MeTV	ABC (simulcast of KSFY-TV)		
November 2	Huron, South Dakota	KTTM (satellite of KTTW)	12.1	Fox	Dark		
November 2	Huron, South Dakota	KTTM (satellite of KTTW)	12.2	Cozi TV	This TV (moved from 7.3)		

==== Subchannel affiliation ====
Date	Market	Station	Channel	Prior affiliation	New affiliation	Source
January 1	Birmingham, Alabama	WBRC	6.3	Grit (moved to 6.5)	Circle	
January 1	Huntsville, Alabama	WAFF	48.3	Grit (moved to 48.5)	Circle	
January 1	Panama City, Florida,	WECP-LD	18.3	Heroes & Icons (moved to 18.4)	Circle	
January 1	Evansville, Indiana	WFIE	14.3	Grit (moved to 14.4)	Circle	
January 1	Ottumwa, Iowa/Kirksville, Missouri	KYOU-TV	15.3	Grit (moved to 15.5)	Circle	
January 1	New Orleans, Louisiana,	WVUE-DT	8.3	Grit (moved to 8.5)	Circle	
January 1	Shreveport, Louisiana,	KSLA	12.2	Grit (moved to 12.4)	Circle	
January 1	Flint/Saginaw/ Bay City, Michigan,	WJRT-TV	12.3	WeatherNation TV (moved to 12.6)	Circle	
January 1	Cincinnati, Ohio,	WCPO-TV	9.3	Laff	Bounce TV	
January 1	Cincinnati, Ohio,	WXIX-TV	19.2	Bounce TV (moved to WCPO-DT 9.3)	Heroes & Icons	
January 1	Cincinnati, Ohio,	WXIX-TV	19.3	Grit	Circle	
January 1	Cincinnati, Ohio,	WXIX-TV	19.4	Ion Television (moved to 19.5)	Grit	
January 1	Cincinnati, Ohio,	WBQC-LD	25.9	Heroes & Icons	Start TV	
January 1	Charleston, South Carolina,	WCSC-TV	5.3	Grit (moved to 5.4)	Circle	
January 1	Myrtle Beach, South Carolina,	WMBF-TV	32.3	Grit (moved to 32.5)	Circle	
January 1	Memphis, Tennessee,	WMC-TV	5.3	Grit (moved to 5.4)	Circle	
January 1	Belton, Texas (Waco/Temple/Bryan)	KNCT	46.2	MeTV (simulcast of KWTX-DT 10.3)	Circle	
January 1	Burlington, Vermont	WCAX-TV	3.5	Ion Television (moved from 3.3)	Circle	
January 1	Richmond, Virginia,	WWBT	12.2	Court TV Mystery (moved to 12.3)	Circle	
January 1	Roanoke, Virginia,	WDBJ	7.2	Heroes & Icons (moved to 7.3)	Circle	
January 1	Green Bay, Wisconsin	WBAY-TV	2.3	Ion Television (moved to 2.6)	Circle	
January 13	Lake Charles, Louisiana,	KVHP	29.3	Ion Television (moved to 29.4)	Circle	

=== Station closures ===
Station	Channel	Affiliation	Market	Date	Notes	Source
KYMA-DT	11.#	NBC	Yuma, Arizona	January 13	On January 13, 2020, the KYMA-DT program streams and intellectual unit were moved to the channel 13 facility, which changed call letters from KSWT to KYMA-DT. The former KYMA-DT's license was surrendered eight days later as a condition of the acquisition of Northwest Broadcasting by Apollo Global Management in 2019. The virtual channel numbering of the former KYMA streams remains the same.	
WNYS-TV	43.#	MyNetworkTV	Syracuse, New York	January 13	The same license surrender situation occurs in Syracuse, with WNYS's license turned in, and its intellectual unit becoming the third subchannel of sister Fox affiliate WSYT. It also retains its existing virtual channels.	
WLFM-LP	6 (audio on 87.7 FM)	radio programming	Cleveland	June 30	One of the remaining analog channel 6 television stations used to broadcast FM audio at 87.7 FM (so-called "Franken FM" stations) in existence, owner Murray Hill Broadcasting announced that it is ending their LMA with TSJ Media, which moves the station's Spanish CHR audio format to a digital-only presence; the station ended its analog operations and presence on FM radio at the same time. WLFM moved to digital channel 20 in the UHF band in the ongoing TV repack and flash-cut to digital; under the new call sign WLFM-LD, the license is broadcasting Jewelry Television on virtual channel 6.1. The remaining analog channel 6 stations meet the same fate over the course of the year.	
W47CK	47	MyNetworkTV	Wilmington, North Carolina	December 11	The station's license was canceled on this date.	
