= Channel 50 =

Channel 50 or TV50 may refer to:

- TV50, a series of events in 2012 celebrating the 50th anniversary of RTÉ Television, Ireland
- Télé 50, a Democratic Republic of Congo television channel

== Mexico ==
The following television stations operate on virtual channel 50 in Mexico:

- XEJ-TDT in Ciudad Juárez, Chihuahua

== See also ==
- Channel 50 virtual TV stations in the United States

For UHF frequencies covering 687.25-691.75 MHz:

- Channel 50 TV stations in Mexico
- Channel 50 digital TV stations in the United States
- Channel 50 low-power TV stations in the United States
