= WHOB =

WHOB may refer to:

- WHOB-LD, a low-power television station (channel 50), licensed to Buxton, North Carolina
- WGAW, a radio station (1340 AM) licensed to Gardner, Massachusetts, which held the call sign WHOB from 1946 to 1953
- WFNQ, a radio station (106.3 FM) licensed to Nashua, New Hampshire, which held the call sign WHOB from 1987 to 2005
