= Eltony Williams =

American actor

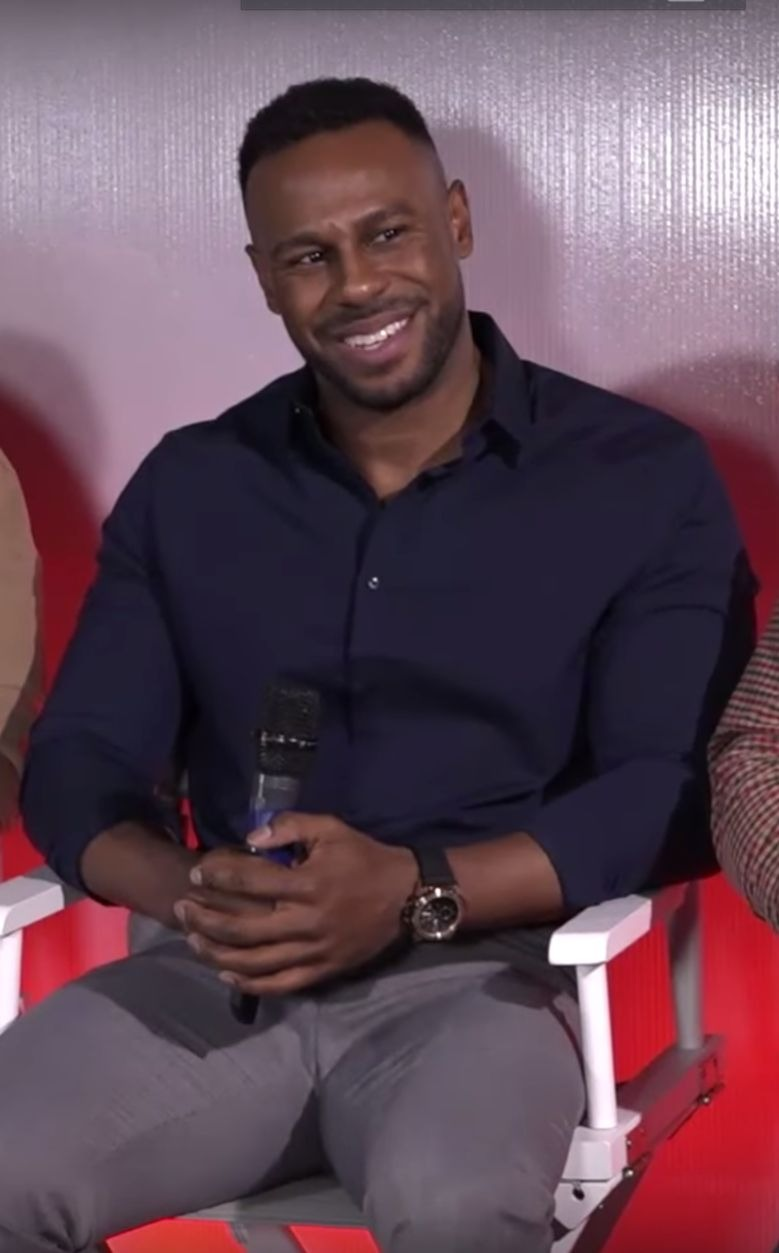
- Williams in 2018
- Born: 09/20/1984; Chicago, Illinois, U.S.
- Occupation: Actor
- Years active: 2003–present

Eltony Williams is an American actor, best known for his role as Dr. Randall Holmes in the Oprah Winfrey Network prime time soap opera, If Loving You Is Wrong.

== Life and career ==
Williams was born and raised in Chicago, Illinois. He began acting appearing in two Steppenwolf Theatre Company productions: A Lesson Before Dying in 2003, and Tennessee Williams' One Arm (2004). He later began appearing on television shows, include guest starring roles in Criminal Minds, ER, House, Castle, and NCIS.

In 2014, Williams was cast as Dr. Randall Holmes in the Oprah Winfrey Network prime time soap opera, If Loving You Is Wrong. He later had a recurring roles in the ABC prime time soap opera Revenge (2014–15) and the Netflix political drama Designated Survivor (2019).
