= KDLT tower =

TV broadcast tower in South Dakota, U.S.

KDLT Tower
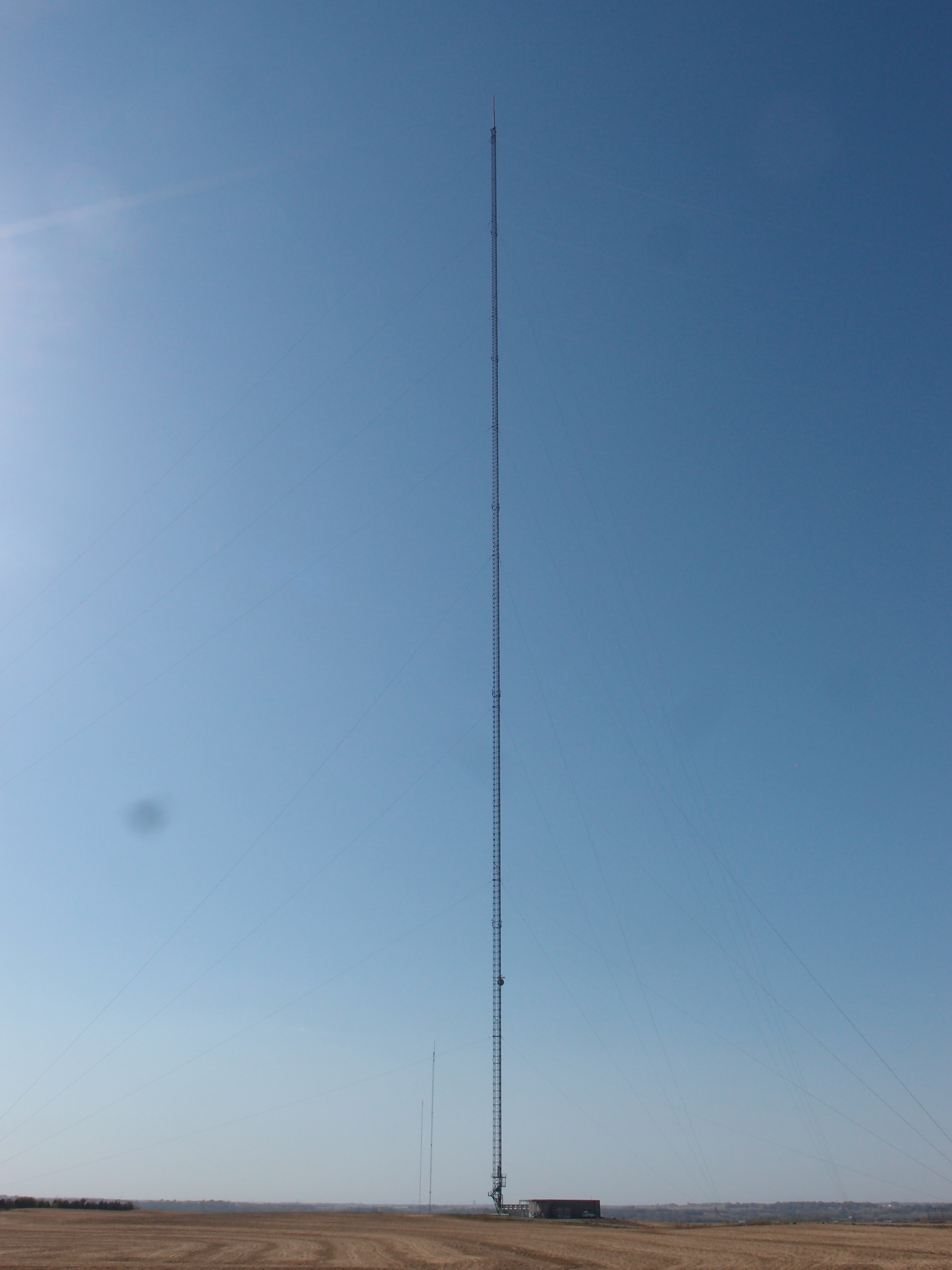

General information
- Type: Television Tower
- Location: County Highway 111, Rowena, South Dakota, United States
- Coordinates: 43°30′18″N 96°33′23″W (digital); 43°37′56″N 097°22′25″W (analog)
- Elevation: 434.9 meters (1,427 ft)
- Completed: August 19, 1998
- Owner: Gray Media Group, Inc.

Height
- Height: 609.2 meters (1,999 ft)

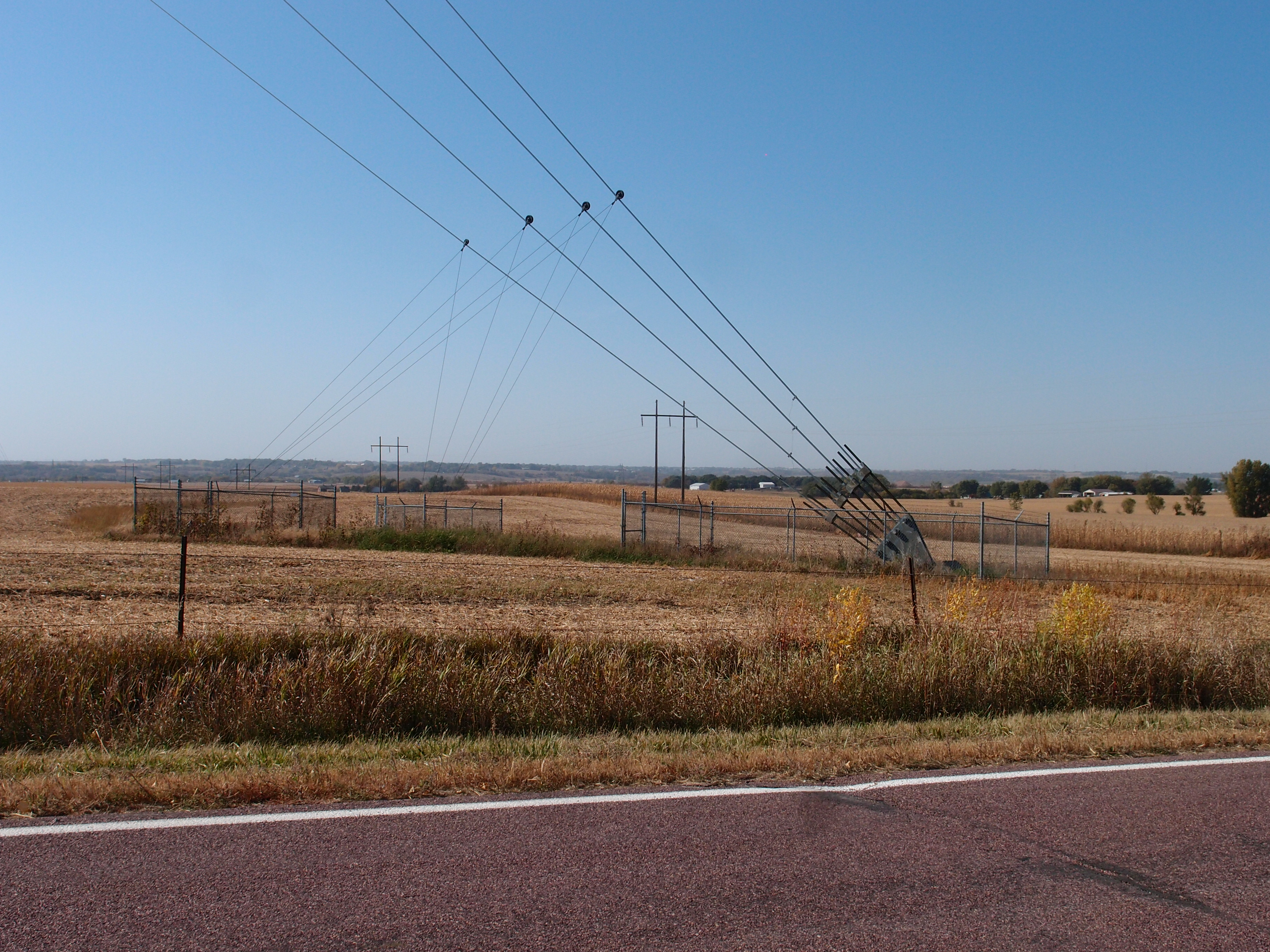
KDLT tower rigging

The KDLT towers is the name given to two towers (one analog and one digital) used by South Dakota television station KDLT. In May 2022 the analog tower was destroyed during a wind storm.

The towers were built as high guy-wired aerial masts for the transmission of TV programs. The original analog tower was built in 1976 near Salem, South Dakota, and was 477 meters (1,565 ft). The digital tower was erected in 1998 near Rowena, South Dakota, and is 609.2 meters (1,999 ft), making it one of the tallest structures in the world. The digital tower is owned by Gray Media Group, Inc, as was the analog tower.

== Beacon lights ==
The aircraft-warning beacon lights at the top of the digital tower must be replaced when they malfunction. When it was standing, and even when it was not in use, the same applied of the analog tower. Replacement of the beacon bulb at the top of the digital tower was featured in an episode of World's Toughest Fixes in 2010. In 2015, amateur drone video footage of a man changing the light bulb on the analog tower went viral attracting more than 29 million views on YouTube and garnering attention from CNN and a newspaper in Britain. On learning of the drone footage, the Federal Aviation Administration (FAA) forbade any further flights; without its approval, drones are restricted by law to a ceiling of 400 feet (120 m), far lower than the height of the tower.

== Destruction of analog tower ==
The analog tower near Salem was destroyed on May 12, 2022 during a wind storm. It had stood since 1976.

== See also ==
- List of masts, table of masts
- Tallest structures in the U.S.
- List of the world's tallest structures
