= Channel 50 digital TV stations in the United States =

The following television stations broadcast on digital channel 50 in the United States:

- KTCJ-LD in Minneapolis, Minnesota, moved to channel 13, on virtual channel 50
- W50CO in Jacksonville, Florida, moved to channel 32
- WHOB-LD in Buxton, North Carolina, moved to channel 35

The following stations, which are no longer licensed, formerly broadcast on digital channel 50:

- K50DY-D in Capulin, etc., New Mexico
- K50MO-D in Palmer, Alaska
- K50NL-D in Lowry, South Dakota
- KATA-CD in Mesquite, Texas
- KBIT-LD in Chico, California
- W50EQ-D in Lumberton, North Carolina
- WQEH-LD in Jackson, Tennessee
- K50GA-D in Laketown, etc., Utah, on virtual channel 14, which rebroadcasts KJZZ-TV
- KHDE-LD in Denver, Colorado, planned to move to channel 4, on virtual channel 51
