= KDLT-TV =

Television station in Sioux Falls, South Dakota

KDLT-TV and KDLV-TV

KDLT-TV: Sioux Falls, South Dakota; KDLV-TV: Mitchell, South Dakota; United States
- Channels for KDLT-TV: Digital: 21 (UHF); Virtual: 46
- Channels for KDLV-TV: Digital: 26 (UHF); Virtual: 5
- Branding: KDLT; Dakota News Now; Fox Sioux Falls

Programming
- Affiliations: 46.1/5.1: NBC; 46.2/5.2: Fox; 13.1: ABC (KDLV-TV only); for others, see § Technical information

Ownership
- Owner: Gray Media; (Gray Television Licensee, LLC)
- Sister stations: KSFY-TV, KPRY-TV

History
- First air date: June 12, 1960 (Note: Channel 5 in Mitchell began June 12, 1960. Channel 46 in Sioux Falls began September 23, 1998. It took the KDLT-TV call sign; channel 5 then became KDLV-TV and was relocated to the west to reduce signal overlap.)
- Former call signs: KDLT-TV: KORN-TV (1960–1973); KXON-TV (1973–1982)
- Former channel number: KDLT-TV: Analog: 5 (VHF, 1960–1998); 46 (UHF, 1998–2009); Digital: 47 (UHF, until 2018); KDLV-TV: Analog: 5 (VHF, 1998–2009)
- Former affiliations: KDLT-TV: NBC (1960–1969); ABC (1969–1983); KDLV-TV: 13.2: CW+ (until 2020); 13.3: MeTV (until 2020)
- Call sign meaning: KDLT-TV: Dakotaland Television, former owners

Technical information
- Licensing authority: FCC
- Facility ID: KDLT-TV: 55379; KDLV-TV: 55375
- ERP: KDLT-TV: 589 kW; KDLV-TV: 1,000 kW
- HAAT: KDLT-TV: 608 m (1,995 ft); KDLV-TV: 315 m (1,033 ft)
- Transmitter coordinates: KDLT-TV: 43°30′18″N 96°33′23″W; KDLV-TV: 43°45′33″N 98°24′44″W

Links
- Public license information: KDLT-TV: Public file; LMS; KDLV-TV: Public file; LMS
- Website: www.dakotanewsnow.com

KDLT-TV (channel 46) in Sioux Falls, South Dakota, and KDLV-TV (channel 5) in Mitchell, South Dakota, are television stations affiliated with NBC and Fox, serving eastern South Dakota and southwest Minnesota. They are owned by Gray Media alongside ABC affiliate KSFY-TV (channel 13). The stations share studios in Courthouse Square on 1st Avenue South in Sioux Falls; KDLT-TV's transmitter is located near Rowena, while KDLV's transmission tower is in Plankinton.

KDLV operates as a full-time satellite of KDLT; its existence is only acknowledged in station identifications. Aside from the transmitter, KDLV has no physical presence in Mitchell. Both of KDLT's subchannels also air on KPRY-TV in Pierre, a semi-satellite of KSFY-TV.

KDLT-TV got its start as KORN-TV, an NBC affiliate on channel 5 in Mitchell, in 1960. It did not begin broadcasting to the Sioux Falls area until 1969, when it switched to ABC. The station changed its call letters to KXON-TV in 1973 when channel 5 was split from KORN radio. The station was sold again in 1982 to become KDLT-TV; it lost its ABC affiliation when the network opted to move to KSFY-TV the next year, picking up NBC instead. For the better part of its history, it suffered from low ratings and the perception that it was a Mitchell station rather than a Sioux Falls station. In 1987, most operations, including news production, moved to Sioux Falls.

In 1998, as part of an effort to improve the station's coverage, a new transmitter on channel 46 in Sioux Falls became the main station, while channel 5 was repurposed as a full-time satellite for the market's western portion. Before then, KDLT had been the only Big Three station in the market with no semi-satellites. Even after these changes, the station has spent the better part of its history as the lowest-rated Big Three station in the market.

In 2019, Gray Television, owner of KSFY, sought and was granted Federal Communications Commission approval to buy KDLT in hopes of creating a stronger challenge to long-dominant KELO-TV. This brought KDLT and KSFY under one roof, with a merged news operation known as Dakota News Now. Gray also merged the two stations' transmitter networks, allowing parts of the market to receive full network service over the air for the first time. In 2020, Gray bought the market's Fox affiliation from KTTW, moving Fox programming to a subchannel of KDLT-TV and the two stations' satellites.

== History ==
=== The Mitchell years ===
Mitchell Broadcasting Association, owner of radio station KORN, applied on July 30, 1957, to build a new television station on channel 5 in Mitchell, South Dakota, to be located southeast of the city. The Federal Communications Commission (FCC) approved the application on November 13 of that year, but it was more than two years before KORN-TV was built and activated on June 12, 1960. It was a primary affiliate of NBC. The next month, in Sioux Falls, KSOO-TV (the future KSFY-TV) signed on, also an NBC affiliate.

Coinciding with the construction of a new 1,569-foot (478 m) tower in Salem, midway between Mitchell and Sioux Falls, KORN-TV switched to ABC on May 12, 1969, giving the network its first primary affiliate in South Dakota. The signal traveled in a 92-mile (148 km) radius from the transmitter site, providing city-grade coverage to 23 counties in eastern South Dakota and giving Sioux Falls full service from all three major networks.

Mitchell Broadcasting sold the station to Buford Television of Tyler, Texas, in 1972 for $775,000. The new owners changed the call sign the next year to KXON-TV, as Mitchell Broadcasting retained the KORN radio stations. Additionally, Buford opened a sales office in downtown Sioux Falls, the station's first physical presence in the city. Buford saw the station through a lengthy reconstruction after the Salem tower was felled in an ice storm on March 27, 1975; ice built up on the tower and, aided by gusting winds, led to its collapse. The station reverted to its original tower in Mitchell before a replacement 1,563-foot (476 m) tower was activated at Salem in mid-1976.

After a proposed purchase of the station by a consortium of investors known as Group Five Television was abandoned in March 1977, Buford put KXON-TV on the market because it had committed to the construction or purchase of four television stations in other parts of the United States. In October 1977, Buford accepted an offer from George N. Gillett Jr. of Wausau, Wisconsin, to purchase KXON-TV. It was the first holding of his Gillett Broadcasting. Gillett noted that he selected KXON-TV to purchase in part because there were so few TV stations on the market; it was affiliated with ABC, then the top network; and it was a low-band VHF TV station. Gillett made improvements to the presentation of the station's two daily newscasts, then branded Metro News, which had perennially been in third place in the market behind KELO-TV and KSFY. Despite this, channel 5 remained hamstrung in its ability to capture ratings, especially for local news, in Sioux Falls. While KELO-TV and KSFY both had at least three full-power transmitters, KXON only had one. Its news department had nine reporters and was half the size of KSFY and a tenth the size of KELO-TV. It had less equipment than its competitors and faced the stigma of being considered a "Mitchell station". It did not help matters that KCAU-TV in Sioux City, Iowa, put a strong signal to much of the market; for most of the time from the late 1960s to the 1980s, it claimed Sioux Falls as part of its primary coverage area.

Gillett sold KXON-TV in 1982 to Dakotaland Broadcasting, owners of KEVN and KIVV in the Rapid City market. The call letters were changed to KDLT on September 27 that year to reflect the new owners (DLT for "Dakotaland Television") and also to "project a new image". The station lost its ABC affiliation the next year after ABC approached KSFY-TV, with its larger network of repeaters and higher ratings, to become its new affiliate in eastern South Dakota. Consequently, KDLT took over KSFY's former NBC affiliation.

=== Heritage and Red River ownership ===
Dakotaland's owners decided to exit the business, selling their broadcast holdings to Heritage Communications in 1985. It was the first acquisition of broadcast stations by the group, which became Heritage Media in 1987 when the broadcast stations were spun out from the firm's cable TV systems. That same year, rule changes allowed KDLT to move most of its operations to a studio on South Westport Avenue in Sioux Falls; previously, the station staff was split between the two cities. At the time, despite NBC's strong primetime lineup as a lead-in, KDLT's newscasts were deep in last place, with only a four percent share. The new owners refocused KDLT's newscasts, now called Sioux First News, on Sioux Falls events. This was out of necessity; Heritage knew KDLT could not hope to adequately cover the 60-county market from a single transmitter.

Heritage Media sold KDLT to Red River Broadcasting, owner of KVRR in Fargo, North Dakota, in 1994. Red River embarked on a two-pronged campaign to expand KDLT's coverage area. In 1995, it set up low-power translators in Aberdeen, Milbank, Pierre, and Watertown, adding over 84,000 potential viewers to its coverage area. Viewers in these areas had long been served over the air by KELO-TV and KSFY.

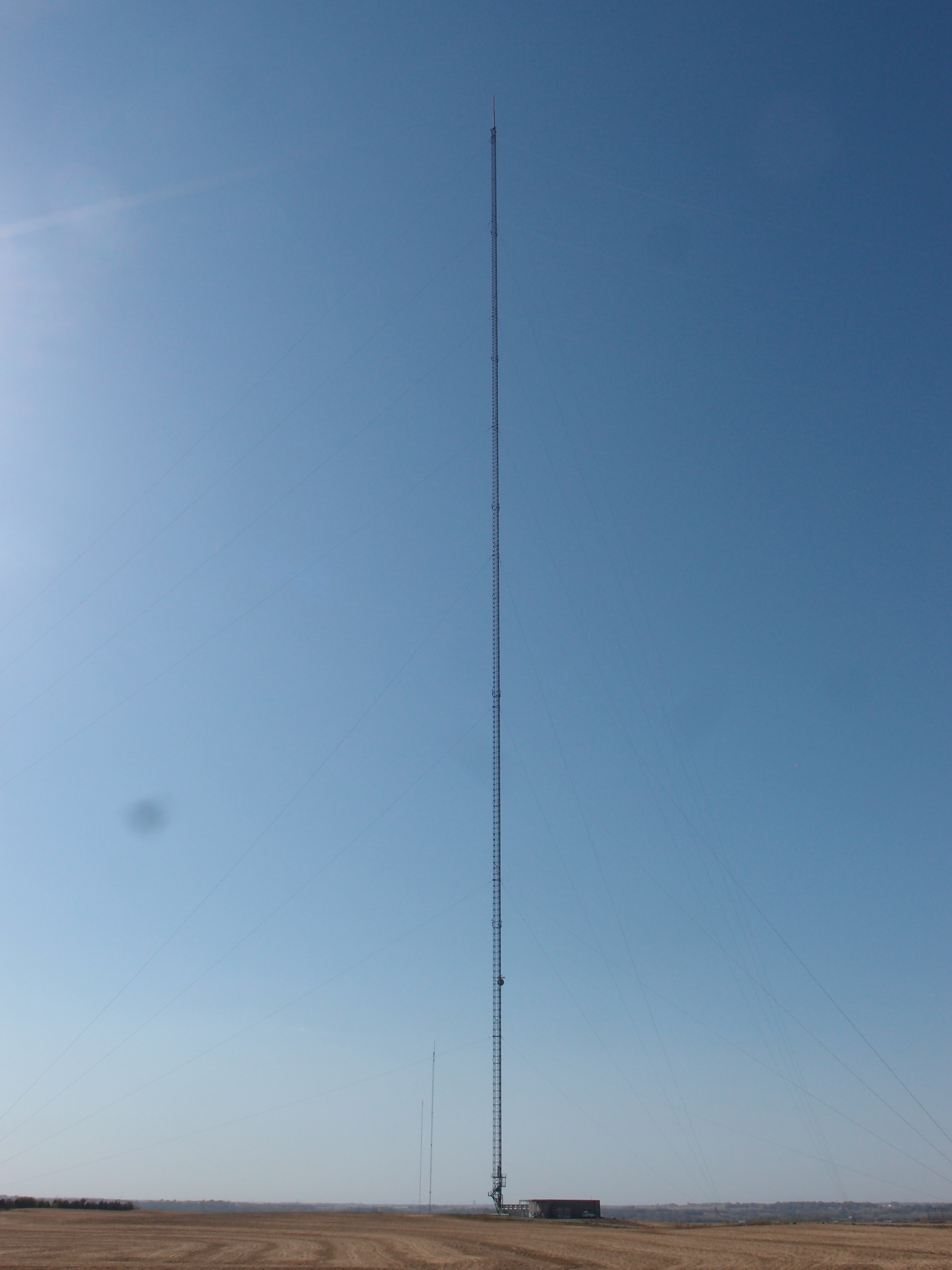
The KDLT tower at Rowena was built in 1998 as part of the launch of the high-power channel 46, part of a signal expansion program undertaken by Red River.

The second phase, however, was even more crucial. FCC rules for the forthcoming introduction of digital television required a station's digital signal to cover at least 80 percent of its analog footprint. KDLT's transmitter was too far away from Sioux Falls to provide that city with an acceptable digital signal; it was located over 41 miles (66 km) from Sioux Falls. In 1989, KDLT had purchased K46CB, a low-power station in Sioux Falls, to improve its reception in the city. On March 6, 1997, the FCC granted Red River a construction permit to replace this translator with a new full-power station licensed to Sioux Falls on channel 46, operating from a tower in Rowena, from where KELO and KSFY had broadcast since the 1960s. On September 23, 1998, Red River activated the new channel 46; it took the KDLT-TV call sign. Channel 5 continued to operate on its original license and changed its call letters to KDLV-TV. (Note: The KDLV-TV call sign had been parked on the channel 46 construction permit since April 1, 1997.) In December, KDLV-TV moved to a new tower in Plankinton, closer to Mitchell and increasing its coverage to the west. The construction of channel 46 was necessary because the FCC did not allow Red River to simply move channel 5's transmitter to Sioux Falls. Channel 46 was the lowest UHF allocation available in Sioux Falls at the time. The changes cost $8 million. The launch of channel 46 coincided with the station launching its first morning newscast, Sioux Falls Today.

By 2016, KDLT-TV's newscasts were still a distant third in the market. The station attracted less than half the viewership of runner-up KSFY-TV and only one-sixth of the audience commanded by long-dominant KELO-TV, which outdrew both stations combined.

=== Consolidation with KSFY-TV ===
On May 1, 2018, Gray Television announced its purchase of KDLT-TV for $32.5 million. The deal created a duopoly with KSFY-TV with the combined operation to be based at KSFY's studios on Courthouse Square in Sioux Falls; in its announcement of the KDLT purchase, Gray noted that the KSFY studio had enough space to house a second station's news and sales department. Gray needed to obtain a waiver in order to complete the deal, since the FCC normally did not allow one entity to own two of the four highest-rated stations in a market. However, in its filing requesting such a waiver, Gray argued that KDLT would be in a stronger position to compete in the market if its resources were combined with those of KSFY. Gray contended that a KSFY/KDLT duopoly would fulfill "a dire need for an effective competitor" in a market where CBS affiliate KELO-TV has been the far-and-away leader for as long as records have been kept. At the time the purchase was announced, KELO-TV held a local news share of 70 percent and an advertising market share of 55 percent, leading Gray to describe Sioux Falls as a "unicorn".

The sale was approved by the FCC on September 24, 2019—a wait of 16 months. Hank Price of TVNewsCheck suggested that legal challenges to the new FCC rules and its handling of such high-profile cases as the attempted acquisition of Tribune Media by Sinclair Broadcast Group diverted its attention. The FCC cited compelling public interest and its own authority, rather than the new rules. Gray took control of KDLT the following day.

Logo of Dakota News Now

On January 13, 2020, KDLT moved its operations to KSFY's studios on Courthouse Square. The merged news operation, Dakota News Now, launched the same day. With the exception of the two-hour morning news at 5 a.m. and 10 p.m. newscast, which both stations air to satisfy network program commitments, newscasts are scheduled on each station at complementary times, with KDLT airing news for an hour at 4 p.m. and half-hours at 5:30 and 6:30 p.m. Between them, the stations air three hours of news on weeknights. Employees that were not retained by the combined newsroom were prioritized for openings elsewhere in the Gray chain. Gray also filled gaps in ABC and NBC coverage by combining the transmitter networks of KDLT-TV and KSFY-TV, making both stations accessible in the same areas. Before the merger, one-third of the market needed cable or satellite to watch both stations; KELO was the only station that covered the entire market over the air.

On November 2, 2020, Gray purchased the non-license assets of KTTW (channel 7) from Independent Communications, Inc.; Fox programming moved to KDLT on subchannel 46.2. Cozi TV, which was also carried on KTTW, moved to subchannel 46.4.

== Technical information ==
The stations' signals are multiplexed, but not with the same programming. This is because KDLV-TV carries KSFY on its third subchannel. KDLT's NBC and Fox subchannels (46.1 and 46.2) are simulcast on KPRY-TV in Pierre.

=== KDLT-TV subchannels ===
Subchannels of KDLT-TV
Channel	Res.	Short name	Programming
46.1	1080i	KDLT-TV	NBC
46.2	720p	FOX	Fox
46.3	480i	The365	365BLK
46.4	480i	Cozi	Cozi TV
46.5	480i	Court	Court TV
46.6	480i	IONMyst	Ion Mystery

=== KDLV-TV subchannels ===
Subchannels of KDLV-TV
Subchannel	Res.	Short name	Programming
5.1	720p	KDLV-TV	NBC
5.2	720p	FOX	Fox
13.1	720p	KSFY-TV	ABC (KSFY-TV)

Simulcast of subchannels of another station

=== Analog-to-digital conversion ===
Both stations shut down their analog signals on February 1, 2009, during the late newscast after Super Bowl XLIII. KDLT chose that time to shut down both analog transmitters for maximum exposure. The two stations continued to broadcast on their pre-transition digital channels—channel 47 for KDLT-TV and channel 26 for KDLV-TV. KDLT relocated its signal from channel 47 to channel 21 on November 30, 2018, as a result of the 2016 United States wireless spectrum auction.

=== Translators ===
KDLT-TV is rebroadcast on the following translator stations:

- Aberdeen: K33MI-D
- Badger: K35GR-D
- Brookings: K17NF-D
- Jackson: K27NF-D
- Pierre: K27HJ-D
- Springfield: K33GX-D
- Watertown: K28OE-D
