= List of If Loving You Is Wrong episodes =

If Loving You Is Wrong is an American primetime television soap opera, created, executive produced, written and directed by Tyler Perry. The show premiered September 9, 2014, on the Oprah Winfrey Network. If Loving You Is Wrong is loosely based on Perry's 2014 film, The Single Moms Club.

== Series overview ==
Season	Episodes		Originally released	
Season	Episodes		First released	Last released
1	42	10	September 9, 2014	November 4, 2014
1	42	10	March 24, 2015	May 26, 2015
1	42	11	September 22, 2015	December 1, 2015
1	42	11	March 15, 2016	May 24, 2016
2	22	11	September 13, 2016	November 29, 2016
2	22	11	March 21, 2017	May 30, 2017
3	18	9	September 19, 2017	November 21, 2017
3	18	9	January 10, 2018	March 7, 2018
4	8		March 19, 2019	April 30, 2019
5	12		March 31, 2020	June 16, 2020

== Episodes ==
=== Season 1 (2014–16) ===
No. overall	No. in season	Title	Original release date	US viewers (millions)
1	1	"A Twisted Affair"	September 9, 2014	1.93
On the Series Premiere, Alex and Randal engage in a fervid tryst while his wife, Marcie, soon becomes desperate to have babies.
2	2	"Shots Fired"	September 9, 2014	1.92
On the Series Premiere, Kelly purchases a new house in Alex and Marcie's neighborhood; Meanwhile, Esperanza's new lover's identity is revealed to her husband, Edward.
3	3	"Alex Is Pregnant"	September 16, 2014	1.80
While Alex and Brad both help Kelly moves into her new home, Alex's infidelity suspicions is put on hold when she reveals she is pregnant.
4	4	"The Colombian"	September 23, 2014	1.64
Travis returns from a mission in Haiti and brings Kelly back a surprise; Meanwhile, Esperanza soon discovers that Julius's father is the leader of a Colombian cartel.
5	5	"The War Begins"	September 30, 2014	1.54
Kelly's precious world soon shatters when Travis reveals that he's engaged to another woman; Alex tries to keep things cool with Brad as she tries to confirm he is the child's father.
6	6	"Game Night"	October 7, 2014	1.80
Alex, Brad, Marcie and Randal all get together and have a game night at Alex and Brad's house and nothing could possibly go wrong.
7	7	"After Heartbreak"	October 14, 2014	1.65
Kelly makes plans to sell her house after learning of Travis's engagement; Marcie and Brad both become suspicious of their spouses; Lushion and Joey receive new jobs.
8	8	"14 Weeks"	October 21, 2014	1.68
The question of the paternity returns when Alex discovers that she is further along with the pregnancy that she originally thought of.
9	9	"Peppa"	October 28, 2014	1.74
Natalie points the fingers at Joey when the Burger Fast has been robbed; Marcie realizes that Randal has sneaking around with a mystery woman named "Peppa".
10	10	"Look Closely"	November 4, 2014	1.87
On the Midseason Finale, in the need of distractions from her own personal drama, Kelly helps Marcie uncover "Peppa"s true identity.
11	11	"The Lady Next Door"	March 24, 2015	2.99
On the Midseason Premiere, Marcie soon discovers the true colors of Alex and Randal's secret affair, and crashes Brad's birthday party with a bombshell.
12	12	"Girlfriends"	March 31, 2015	2.53
After Alex and Randal's secret affair is exposed; Kelly, Natalie, and Esperanza all make promises to stay by her side and comfort her.
13	13	"Fatherless Boys"	April 7, 2015	2.02
Justice confronts Kelly about the fact that his father called or talked to him; Joey interviews for a job at a chemical plant.
14	14	"Who Knew"	April 14, 2015	2.28
Brad investigates further into Alex and Randal's secret affair and questions all of Alex's friends before seeking revenge on Randal.
15	15	"Marcie & Brad"	April 21, 2015	2.21
Marcie propositions Brad so that the two being-cheated-on spouses can get back at Alex and Randal; Randal gets served divorce papers.
16	16	"Whose Baby?"	April 28, 2015	1.97
Alex experiences contractions-like symptoms and is rushed to the doctor's office; Brad demands a paternity test.
17	17	"The Randal Connection"	May 5, 2015	1.95
Randal reveals to Marcie that he's the biological father of Alex's unborn child, and unravels secrets to figure out a way to deal with Edward.
18	18	"The Debt"	May 12, 2015	2.07
Edward becomes an intimate target of an act of revenge; Quan struggles in a fight to pay back the debt he owes Julius.
19	19	"Nine P.M."	May 19, 2015	2.21
Travis makes seduction moves on Kelly during a house visit as she finds herself tempted; Lushion finds and rescue Eddie after a deadly shooting.
20	20	"Alex's Baby"	May 26, 2015	2.05
Alex goes into labor; Natalie convinces Lushion to quit the force; Edward reveals his feelings to Esperanza.
21	21	"Miss Louise"	September 22, 2015	2.90
Alex gives birth and the news soon creates tension; As Marcie struggles with her and Randal's marriage, a surprise lies ahead.
22	22	"The Beauty That Is"	September 29, 2015	2.32
The girlfriends all show love and support for Alex as she deals and struggles with the birth.
23	23	"The Painter"	October 6, 2015	2.05
Alex dreams of how her and Randal's secret affairs first started.
24	24	"Blonde Hair, Blue Eyes"	October 13, 2015	1.96
Louise discloses information to Marcie about Randal's fixated attractions to blonde women with blue eyes.
25	25	"The Shed"	October 20, 2015	2.01
Randal learns that "Karma" really does exist.
26	26	"Being a Woman"	October 27, 2015	2.44
Randal's wife and mother both deal with their sudden conflicted feelings.
27	27	"Joey and Faun"	November 3, 2015	2.28
Marcie gains an unexpected ally; Faun tries to make a reconciliation with Natalie.
28	28	"The Tape"	November 10, 2015	2.43
Edward and Ben go forward with big plans to take down their enemies.
29	29	"He's Beautiful"	November 17, 2015	2.23
Brad surprises Alex with something extremely terrible.
30	30	"Time For A Cigar"	November 24, 2015	2.19
Because of his sudden betrayal, Brad taunts Randal with much malice.
31	31	"Out of Control"	December 1, 2015	2.51
On the Midseason Finale, Edward plans out something very vicious.
32	32	"Mortal & Fifth"	March 15, 2016	2.47
On the Midseason Premiere, a horrible ambush ends in catastrophes.
33	33	"The Last Word"	March 22, 2016	2.20
Randal confronts his wife, Marcie, about her infidelity.
34	34	"Backfired"	March 29, 2016	2.19
Kelly does her best and all she can do to protect Alex.
35	35	"Randal's Wicked Web"	April 5, 2016	1.99
Randal comes after Alex and Brad.
36	36	"A Mother's Love"	April 12, 2016	2.19
Alex realizes the depth of Randal's evil sides.
37	37	"Betting on Tina"	April 19, 2016	2.20
Edward discovers that a nurse is his most formidable opponent.
38	38	"The Brown Paper Bag"	April 26, 2016	2.05
Lushion searches high and low for a piece of evidence.
39	39	"For Pete"	May 3, 2016	2.30
Lushion takes a stand against corruption.
40	40	"The Will"	May 10, 2016	2.37
Julius faces a shocking bombshell-filled blow.
41	41	"An Evil Alliance"	May 17, 2016	2.28
A secret alliance is formed.
42	42	"The Wicked Soul"	May 24, 2016	2.39
On the Season 1 Finale, Lushion confesses a shocking secret which leads to a tailspin.

=== Season 2 (2016–17) ===
No. overall	No. in season	Title	Original release date	US viewers (millions)
43	1	"Watch Your Back"	September 13, 2016	2.94
In the Season 2 premiere, Alex comes across the most shocking and grizzly scene.
44	2	"911 Emergency"	September 20, 2016	2.33
Alex leaves home in a desperate state and takes matter into her own hands.
45	3	"Boiling Point"	September 27, 2016	2.16
The police searches for Alex's missing baby while Natalie waits for news about Joey.
46	4	"You're The Boss"	October 4, 2016	2.06
Edward is reminded of who's the boss when he oversteps his authority in front of Steven.
47	5	"An Unlikely Suspect"	October 11, 2016	2.25
The Police identify a suspect for a horrific crime that shocks the whole town.
48	6	"The Power of Love"	October 18, 2016	2.03
The Police interrogates their top suspect in a shocking, horrific crime.
49	7	"The Wages of Sin"	October 25, 2016	2.08
Brad is being questioned by the Police; Joey fights for his life.
50	8	"Keeping Watch"	November 1, 2016	1.89
Edward tries to awaken an unconscious Louise in order to get information of what she knows about Brad; Lushion scolds an agent for not watching Pete's room.
51	9	"A Room For You"	November 15, 2016	2.05
Alex and Andrew awaits backup on a quiet country road, and things are not very quiet at the hospital.
52	10	"Every Minute Counts"	November 22, 2016	2.00
Marcie receives life-changing news.
53	11	"Rusty's Brand Of Justice"	November 29, 2016	2.41
On the Midseason Finale, Rusty unleashes his brand of justice and all hell breaks loose.
54	12	"A Neighborhood In Crisis"	March 21, 2017	1.96
On the Midseason Premiere, Alex fights to save her baby; Kelly learns the shocking whereabouts of her neighbor, Ramsey.
55	13	"Su Ling Mai"	March 28, 2017	1.97
Pete takes on an alias in order to keep himself out of Edward's grasp.
56	14	"A Fatal Attraction"	April 4, 2017	1.89
Travis soon loses his entire mind and becomes a crazed predator.
57	15	"The Missing Person"	April 11, 2017	2.03
The Police search for the missing Andrew.
58	16	"The Mailman"	April 18, 2017	1.87
Kelly panics when she learns about the crime Travis has committed.
59	17	"Tippa Haynes"	April 25, 2017	1.92
Randal questions the paternity of Alex's baby.
60	18	"The Party Just Arrived"	May 2, 2017	1.85
Dianne confronts and bullies Kelly with outrageous demands.
61	19	"Don't Lose Your Deposit"	May 9, 2017	1.83
Louise gives Marcie advice about Brad.
62	20	"No One Is Safe"	May 16, 2017	1.79
Kelly finds herself in an all-to-familiar predicament with a man she just can't ever get rid of.
63	21	"Angry Men"	May 23, 2017	1.81
Travis acts on his vengeful impulses.
64	22	"Sound The Alarm"	May 30, 2017	1.90
On the Season 2 Finale, Kelly discovers a new, but risky way to protect herself from Travis.

=== Season 3 (2017–18) ===
No. overall	No. in season	Title	Original release date	US viewers (millions)
65	1	"A Difficult Path"	September 19, 2017	1.89
On the Season 3 Premiere, the whole neighborhood is left reeling after a tragedy that threatens all the lives of the children in the neighborhood.
66	2	"Justice"	September 26, 2017	1.70
Kelly finds herself facing legal troubles that threatens her life and freedom; Meanwhile, Randal continues to antagonize Marcie and Brad.
67	3	"In Distress"	October 3, 2017	1.93
Lushion goes to the aid of Kelly when she's wrongfully accused of a serious crime.
68	4	"Enemy Secrets"	October 10, 2017	1.81
Eddie declares war on Steven and Lushion; Kelly finally finds her some help for her legal troubles.
69	5	"A Taste Of Freedom"	October 17, 2017	1.84
Randal intensifies his twisted harassment of Alex and Brad.
70	6	"Falling"	October 24, 2017	1.79
Brad gets even with Randal, which leads to almost serious injury; Randal calls the police, but is not given much help.
71	7	"Something Is Rotten"	November 7, 2017	1.72
Randal secretly undermines Marcie in her attempts to hire legal counsel; Eddie surprises Esperanza and is angered by his discovery.
72	8	"Dark Intentions"	November 14, 2017	1.79
Lushion comes to Kelly's rescue by going after Travis; Meanwhile, Steven reveals his true feelings to Esperanza.
73	9	"Chains, Guns, and Automobiles"	November 21, 2017	1.77
On the Midseason Finale, Larry mistakenly breaks Marcie's confidence, leaving her in great peril; Travis goes after Kelly in the dead of night.
74	10	"A Dame In Distress"	January 10, 2018	1.39
On the Midseason Premiere, Randal enacts a twisted game against Eddie, and Eddie must call upon Lushion for help.
75	11	"The Porch Light"	January 17, 2018	1.60
Lushion reluctantly comes to Eddie's rescue, and Eddie vows revenge against Randal and his attorney, Larry.
76	12	"The Papers"	January 24, 2018	1.55
Kelly discovers that she has been betrayed by her attorney; Steven continues his pursuit of Esperanza.
77	13	"Hanging in the Balance"	January 31, 2018	1.47
Eddie enacts a horrific game of revenge against Randal's attorney, Larry.
78	14	"The Battleground State"	February 7, 2018	1.52
Randal receives some high-powered assistance as he works to destroy Marcie; Justice soon becomes traumatized by his Mother's troubles.
79	15	"Golfer"	February 14, 2018	1.46
Marcie finds who she hopes can be a strong ally in her fight against Randal; Brad gives Alex an ultimatum that forces her to make a promise that she will have a hard time keeping.
80	16	"Rock Solid"	February 21, 2018	1.49
Randal sounds the alarm bells, informing the police and the law firm that Larry may be missing and in great danger.
81	17	"In God's Hands"	February 28, 2018	1.53
Lushion confronts Eddie of Larry's whereabouts; Meanwhile, Randal confronts Dr. Raston with a criminal accusation.
82	18	"Behind Enemy Lines"	March 7, 2018	1.55
The sins of the neighborhood all comes to a head in catastrophic events across the city.

=== Season 4 (2019) ===
No. overall	No. in season	Title	Original release date	US viewers (millions)
83	1	"Let It Burn"	March 19, 2019	1.51
Lushion comes to the rescue, but it may be too late.
84	2	"The Red Dress"	March 20, 2019	1.03
Tensions are high once again after Kelly's tragedy.
85	3	"Randal's Stage"	March 27, 2019	0.81
Kelly's mental state prompts the women to worry about her life; Meanwhile, Randal finds something to dig into.
86	4	"Chest Pains"	April 2, 2019	1.13
Alex faces all of the lies that have come to light.
87	5	"Psychosis"	April 9, 2019	1.18
Edward pushes Esperanza to a breaking point.
88	6	"A First Date"	April 16, 2019	1.20
All of the lies done in the dark are coming to light as Alex tries to fix her life.
89	7	"Digging Up Old Dirt"	April 23, 2019	0.99
Randal is given a fair warning from Tanya and Larry.
90	8	"Jennifer"	April 30, 2019	1.13
All of the evil that Randal has ever put out into the world seems to be coming back around to him.

=== Season 5 (2020) ===
No. overall	No. in season	Title	Original release date	U.S. viewers (millions)
91	1	"An Old Skeleton"	March 31, 2020	1.11
Secrets abound and skeletons come out to play in the small community of Maxine, Ohio.
92	2	"Jennifer Peppa"	April 7, 2020	1.07
Alex tries to abandon her responsibilities.
93	3	"Under the Influence"	April 14, 2020	1.03
Kelly discovers her inner strength to keep fighting for her freedom.
94	4	"Contraband"	April 21, 2020	0.95
The stakes are raised in Kelly's predicament.
95	5	"Going Along for the Ride"	April 28, 2020	1.16
After signing the divorce papers, Alex hits rock bottom.
96	6	"The Pardon"	May 5, 2020	1.03
Lushion does everything in his power to rescue Kelly and help prove her innocence.
97	7	"Red Paint"	May 12, 2020	1.07
Randal finds evidence leading him to the vandal he was looking for.
98	8	"The Firm"	May 19, 2020	1.07
Relationships are put to the test.
99	9	"The Great Escape"	May 26, 2020	1.10
Eddie's disregard for others comes back to bite him.
100	10	"Taken"	June 2, 2020	1.13
Eddie and Esperanza's dysfunctional relationship comes to a head.
101	11	"I Need a Hero"	June 9, 2020	1.05
Alex's bad choices comes back to haunt her.
102	12	"Boom"	June 16, 2020	1.16
On the Series Finale, Eddie's poor decision costs the life of others.

== Ratings ==
If Loving You Is Wrong : U.S. viewers per episode (millions)
Audience measurement performed by Nielsen Media Research
