= Channel 50 low-power TV stations in the United States =

The following low-power television stations broadcast on digital or analog channel 50 in the United States:

- K50GA-D in Laketown, etc., Utah
- KHDE-LD in Denver, Colorado, to move to channel 4
- KTCJ-LD in Minneapolis, Minnesota, to move to channel 13
- W50CO in Jacksonville, Florida, to move to channel 32
- WHOB-LD in Buxton, North Carolina, to move to channel 35
- WQUB500 in Camp Verde, Arizona

The following television stations, which are no longer licensed, formerly broadcast on digital or analog channel 50:

- K50AC in Woodland & Kamas, Utah
- K50DY-D in Capulin, etc., New Mexico
- K50EC in Fruitland, Utah
- K50EH in Fairbanks, Alaska
- K50EZ in Montrose, etc., Colorado
- K50GM in Hobbs, New Mexico
- K50GO in Roosevelt, Utah
- K50GP in Redding, California
- K50JG in Independence, Kansas
- K50JI in North Platte, Nebraska
- K50MO-D in Palmer, Alaska
- K50NL-D in Lowry, South Dakota
- KAMT-LP in Amarillo, Texas
- KATA-CD in Mesquite, Texas
- KBIT-LD in Chico, California
- KCCE-LP in San Luis Obispo, California
- KMAO-LP in Raymondville, Texas
- KPSG-LP in Palm Springs, California
- KTSS-LP in Hope, Arkansas
- KUME-LP in Midland/Odessa, Texas
- W50BO in Ashville, Alabama
- W50EQ-D in Lumberton, North Carolina
- WGSA-CA in Savannah, Georgia
- WNGS-LP in Anderson, South Carolina
- WQEH-LD in Jackson, Tennessee
