= Télé 50 =

Television channel of the Democratic Republic of Congo

- Country: DR Congo
- Broadcast area: National
- Headquarters: Kinshasa

Programming
- Language(s): Lingala and French

Ownership
- Owner: Congo-24 SARL

History
- Launched: June 24, 2010 (14 years ago)

Télé 50 is a private television channel in the Democratic Republic of Congo, broadcasting from the provincial city of Kinshasa. Created in 2010, it is a channel close to former president Joseph Kabila Kabange.

== History ==
The channel was launched on June 24, 2010, on the fiftieth anniversary of the country's independence from Belgium, whose General Director is Jean-Marie Kassamba. News from the Democratic Republic of Congo and international news is its goal and it bears the slogan "Simply Congolese". Kasamba accused the channel of "censorship" in 2019, when the analog terrestrial signal was switched off on 30 March, presumably for political reasons. In June, Kasamba was ejected from his position at the National Press Union of the Congo (UNPC) under false accusations that its equipment was destroyed. On 10 April, about 80 journalists from the channel were detained, but were released two days later. The journalists were protesting the network's stubbornness in creating its labor union.

The channel's tenth anniversary was plagued by problems, as the channel was unable to pay its finances since Kabila left his post as president of the DRC. The residence of its main presenter was vandalized by UDPS supporters.

On 8 December 2023, journalist Fabien Lumbala, host of Ça va débat, left the channel due to its rejection in airing his election campaign.

From 2016 to April 2024, Télé 50 was also available in Angola and Mozambique on the Zap operator's Zap Plus package of French-language channels. It was removed on 23 April due to a revision of its offer.
