= If Loving You Is Wrong =

2014 American primetime television soap opera

- Genre: Soap opera
- Created by: Tyler Perry
- Written by: Tyler Perry
- Directed by: Tyler Perry
- Starring: Amanda Clayton; Matt Cook; Edwina Findley; Heather Hemmens; Zulay Henao; Jay Hunter; April Parker Jones; Octavio Pizano; Joel Rush; Aiden Turner; Denzel Wells; Charles Malik Whitfield; Eltony Williams; Donovan Christie Jr.
- Country of origin: United States
- Original language: English
- No. of seasons: 5
- No. of episodes: 102 (list of episodes)

Production
- Executive producers: Tyler Perry; Ozzie Areu; Mark E. Swinton; Will Areu
- Camera setup: Multiple
- Running time: 42 minutes
- Production company: Tyler Perry Studios

Original release
- Network: Oprah Winfrey Network
- Release: September 9, 2014 – June 16, 2020

Related
- A Madea Family Funeral (2019 film)

If Loving You Is Wrong is an American prime time television soap opera created, executive produced, written, and directed by Tyler Perry. The series premiered on September 9, 2014 and ended on June 16, 2020. It focuses on the lives and relationships of a group of five husbands and wives who live on the same street (Castillo Lane) in the fictional community of Maxine. The show stars Amanda Clayton, Edwina Findley, Heather Hemmens, Zulay Henao, and April Parker Jones as the five female leads Alex, Kelly, Marcie, Esperanza and Natalie on "their quest to find love in the midst of managing very complex lives."

== Overview ==
If Loving You Is Wrong is loosely based on Perry's 2014 film The Single Moms Club. Actress Zulay Henao reprised her movie role of Esperanza, although her character and storyline was rewritten for the TV series. It was officially ordered straight-to-series on January 9, 2014. It premiered on September 9, 2014, on the Oprah Winfrey Network (OWN), and the first half of the first season finale aired on November 4, 2014.

The series premiere was the highest-rated in OWN history, setting a new record over The Haves and the Have Nots. The second half of the first season aired on March 24, 2015. On February 27, 2015, the series was renewed for a second season with 22 more episodes. The second season premiered on September 22, 2015. The second half premiered on March 15, 2016. OWN renewed the series for a third season. The third season of the series premiered on September 13, 2016.

On January 7, 2020, OWN announced the series' return for the fifth season, stating that it's "coming soon". On February 5, 2020, OWN announced that season five will be the final season, which premiered on March 31, 2020. The series finale aired on June 16, 2020. On June 25, 2020, OWN announced a cast reunion special titled "Oh So Right", which premiered on June 30, 2020.

== Cast and characters ==
=== Main cast ===
- Amanda Clayton as Alex Montgomery, a housewife who was married to British businessman Brad. She has two children with him, Peter and Paisley, after which he had a vasectomy. Alex was caught having an affair with her next-door neighbor, Randall, which ends her friendship with Randall's wife Marcie and prompts Brad to leave her. She gave birth to a third child, a son. Although she thought initially that her son was Randall's, the DNA test determined that the father may have been one of the lovers she took during the period in which she had a dating profile alias under the name "Jennifer Peppa".
- Matt Cook as Joey Blackman (seasons 1–3), Natalie's oldest son, who was released from jail. Somewhat naïve while he gets used to his new freedom, his mother often hovers over him, especially at her Burger Fast restaurant (where they both work). Joey's love interest is Faun, the boss's daughter and his childhood friend. In Season 3, he is stuck in jail again after using a gun as a weapon to shoot Quan, ultimately violating Joey's probation.
- Edwina Findley as Kelly Isaacs, a single, working mother to a young son named Justice. She is being pursued by a man named Travis, despite his being engaged to someone he met while in Haiti. Though she developed feelings for a new neighbor next door named Ramsey, he is later found murdered in his home - with Kelly as the main suspect. Later, after Travis stalks Kelly, she shoots and kills him. While in jail, she can't come to terms with what she has done and still sees images of Travis stalking her. Kelly attempts suicide and Lushion finds her hanging in her cell. Kelly survives and is tied to her bed on suicide watch.
- Tiffany Haddish as Jackie (season 1), Natalie's loyal assistant at Burger Fast. A very business-savvy woman.
- Heather Hemmens as Marcie Holmes, a real estate agent and Randall's unhappy ex-wife, who is angry with Alex for her affair with Randall. Hurt and upset, Marcie gets even with both of them by embarking on a revenge affair with Brad. Throughout the series, she becomes deeply in love with him. She demands that Randall divorce her; he refuses, because he still loves her - but he also loves Alex. In Season 3, it is revealed that Marcie is pregnant, but with Brad's child. However, in the Season 3 finale, it is revealed that Randall may be the father of her baby. At the end of Season 4, Marcie finally gets the divorce from Randall, but suffers a miscarriage.
- Zulay Henao as Esperanza Willis, ex-girlfriend of Edward, a 911 dispatcher for the city of Maxine. She is the mother of a daughter named Mika. When she began dating Julius, he immediately became a target of Edward's rage and jealousy, which is later justified: Julius is the son of a drug-cartel leader, which constantly places her and Mika in danger.
- April Parker Jones as Natalie Henning, a single, working mother of four kids who manages a fast food restaurant called Burger Fast. She often hovers over her oldest son, Joey. She is engaged to Lushion, a police officer with the Maxine Police Department. He is also the father of their son Frank.
- Eltony Williams as Dr. Randall Holmes, a psychologist and Marcie's former husband. He has an affair with Alex, which destroys both his marriage to Marcie and his friendship with Brad. With the affair out in the open in the Season 2 premiere, he is attacked by both Eddie and Brad. Later that night, Brad destroys Randall's boat and comes at him with an axe and the two begin to fight as Brad pulls out a gun and shots are fired.
- Aiden Turner as Brad Montgomery, a former British Royal Marine who fought in Iraq with Alex's cousin, Eddie. He later became a businessman and married Alex. He was unaware of his wife's affair with his friend Randall until the premiere of Season 2. He gets into a fight with Randall, demolishes his boat and nearly kills him. He eventually leaves Alex and begins a revenge affair with Marcie, developing feelings for her despite his unresolved feelings for Alex. With Alex, Brad is the father of Peter and Paisley. Brad had a vasectomy after Paisley's birth, which gives credence to Randall being the father of Alex's newborn son. At the start of Season 5, Brad officially divorces Alex and begins dating Marcie.
- Joel Rush as Edward "Eddie" Willis, Esperanza's sociopathic ex, Alex's paternal cousin and Brad's friend. Eddie is a former U.S. Marine and a very corrupt police officer for the city of Maxine. He has a daughter named Mika with Esperanza. He still intends to control her life, although he has remarried and has kids with a woman named Yolanda. Later, he reveals that he is still in love with Esperanza, which drives him to behave the way he does. A recovering cocaine addict, he also turns out to be a troubled undercover narc for the DEA. Rush reprises his role in A Madea Family Funeral.
- Octavio Pizano as Julius Escada Jr. (Seasons 1–3), Esperanza's new boyfriend, a target of the jealous Edward's rage. Edward has reason to worry, however, as Julius is the son of a drug kingpin. Edward is concerned for the safety of Esperanza and, more importantly, his daughter, Mika.
- Charles Malik Whitfield as Lushion Morgan, Natalie's fiancé and the father of her youngest son, Frankie. He's a former U.S. Army Ranger turned rookie cop alongside Eddie, with whom he has a hostile working relationship due to his corrupt ways. However, he still has enough loyalty to save him from a drive-by shooting. Lushion also works as an undercover FBI agent at the station.
- Jay Hunter as Ian Glenn (seasons 4–5), a criminal defense attorney and friend of Lushion. Ian is recruited to be Kelly's attorney, but hits a roadblock when his firm represents Travis' family's church. Ian is also looking for a new home and recruits Marcie as his real estate agent; an instant attraction begins.
- Denzel Wells as Travis Cain (seasons 1–4), Kelly's love interest, who is away on a relief mission in Haiti. Upon his return, he reveals that he got engaged to another woman while in Haiti and left Kelly. However, he has second thoughts, and ends his engagement. He then pursues Kelly anew, although she is very disinterested. During Seasons 3 and 4, he becomes very hostile towards Kelly. He is shot and killed by Kelly later in Season 4.
- Dawan Owens as Quan (seasons 1–3), Joey's old running buddy who is not liked by Lushion and Natalie, (and, at times, Joey himself). In Season 3, he is killed during a shoot-out with Joey, who is seriously injured but survives.
- Donovan Christie Jr. as Larry Connlee (seasons 4–5), an attorney who helps Marcie in her legal battles against Randall. It is revealed he was a college friend of Randall, and they both share a dark secrets behind closed doors. They had a perverse, sexual and sadistic past as swingers with both women and men. Larry also has an insatiable fetish for BDSM. During the later part of the series, the duo both have made numerous remarks toward each other that are filled with innuendo. It was not revealed if the two have ever been intimate with each other until season 5 when Marcie exposed to Randall that she knew they had sexual relations in the past. It was also revealed in that season that he and his wife shared mutual agreements in their open relationship ventures.

=== Recurring cast ===
- Brianne Davis as Yolanda (season 1), Edward's new wife who would, like Esperanza did, leave him. An alcoholic, she absolutely despises Esperanza, and the two women often quarrel. Has two children with Edward, and is Mika's stepmother.
- Claudette Ortiz as Claudia (season 2), a new addition to the 911 emergency service who is also the half-sister of Quan.
- Jasmine Guy as Mattaline Cain (season 1), Travis' mother who did not approve of Kelly, but later accepts her.
- Marie L. Burke (Season 1)/Judi Blair (seasons 2–3) as Faun, daughter of Mr. Kym, owner of Burger Fast. Faun is friendly with Joey, who develops a love interest in him and works at Burger Fast with Natalie and Jackie.
- Clayton Landey as Captain Daniel Mackey (seasons 1–2), the immediate superior of Edward and Lushion and the head of the Maxine Police Department.
- Sharon Conley as Sally (season 1–2), owner of the 911 operatation station and Esperanza's supervisor.
- Ryan Haake as Steven Simmons, Eddie & Lushion's boss and secretly and FBI agent. Steven becomes attracted to Esperanza, hence creating a volatile relationship with her child's father Eddie.
- Celine Areu as Mika Willis, the daughter of Eddie and Esperanza.
- Chase Wainscott as Peter Montgomery, the son and oldest child of Brad and Alex.
- Ashlyn Areu as Paisley Montgomery, the daughter and youngest child of Brad and Alex.
- Timmy Richardson as Justice Issacs, the son of Kelly.
- Donielle T. Hansley Jr. as Frank Morgan, the youngest son of Natalie and Lushion.
- Tari Ayana as LaQuanda Henning, Natalie's oldest daughter.
- Justice Jones as Tenesha Henning, Natalie's youngest daughter.
- Trevante Rhodes as Ramsey Walters (season 2), Kelly's new neighbor, to whom she is attracted. In the third season, it is revealed that he was murdered by Travis.
- Kerry Rhodes as Rick Connor (seasons 3−5) an officer at the police station who has personal connections with Travis and his family's church. He is helping Kelly's case against Travis.
- Ruan Martins as Andrew Simms (seasons 2–3) a rookie cop who work at the station.
- McKinley Freeman as Deon (seasons 3–4), an officer at the police station who has personal connections with Travis and his family's church and later comes into conflict with Kelly.
- Chris V. Pipkin as Pete Davis (seasons 2−3), a rookie cop who works under Lushion and takes it upon himself to investigate Ben's shooting.
- Andrea Frye as Louise Holmes (seasons 2–3), Randall's mother, who had differences with Marcie because she feels that Marcie was no good for Randall but later decides to put her differences to the side when she learns of Marcie and Randall's marital problems. She attempts to be a peacemaker between the two.
- Jordan Wiseley as Ben Bryant (seasons 2–3), a drug addict and rookie cop who works under Eddie.
- Debra Stipe as Dr. Raston, Alex's longtime doctor who learns of Alex and Brad's marital issues behind her affair with Randal. She tends to be the peacemaker between the two. She is also Marcie's doctor.
- Grant Mellon as Bennett (season 5), an EMT firefighter and also a new neighbor who moved in across the street from Alex and Randal. He also saved them from the fire when they both were locked in the shed together.
- Gracie McGraw as Tanya (season 5), Bennett's wife who has a mental illness.
- Sean Riggs as Terrell (seasons 2 and 5) Kelly's ex and Justice's biological father, who was previously incarcerated.

== Episodes ==
| Season | Episodes | | Originally released | |
| Season | Episodes | | First released | Last released |
|---|---|---|---|---|
| 1 | 42 | 10 | September 9, 2014 | November 4, 2014 |
| 1 | 42 | 10 | March 24, 2015 | May 26, 2015 |
| 1 | 42 | 11 | September 22, 2015 | December 1, 2015 |
| 1 | 42 | 11 | March 15, 2016 | May 24, 2016 |
| 2 | 22 | 11 | September 13, 2016 | November 29, 2016 |
| 2 | 22 | 11 | March 21, 2017 | May 30, 2017 |
| 3 | 18 | 9 | September 19, 2017 | November 21, 2017 |
| 3 | 18 | 9 | January 10, 2018 | March 7, 2018 |
| 4 | 8 | | March 19, 2019 | April 30, 2019 |
| 5 | 12 | | March 31, 2020 | June 16, 2020 |
