= The Pack (TV series) =

American 2020 reality competition

- Genre: Documentary; adventure; reality competition
- Presented by: Lindsey Vonn
- Country of origin: United States
- Original language: English
- No. of seasons: 1
- No. of episodes: 10

Production
- Executive producers: Jay Bienstock; David Garfinkle; Jay Renfroe
- Production companies: Amazon Studios; Renegade 83

Original release
- Network: Amazon Prime Video
- Release: November 20, 2020

The Pack is an American reality competition television series hosted by Lindsey Vonn. It premiered on Amazon Prime Video on November 20, 2020.

== Background ==
The series features 12 dogs and their human owners traveling around the world to compete in various challenges including tugging, pulling, scent work, and more. The dogs and their owners are accompanied by veterinarians and dog experts to make sure the contestants are kept safe. The winning duo receives a $500,000 prize, with an additional $250,000 going to a charity of their choice. Mark won the pack! The series has been described as The Amazing Race with dogs.

== Production ==
In August 2019, Amazon Studios greenlit the series, with Olympic gold medal skier Lindsey Vonn as the host. It also features Vonn's dog Lucy. The show is executive produced by Jay Bienstock, Jay Renfroe, and David Garfinkle. It was filmed across eight countries in early 2020, prior to the COVID-19 restrictions. In January 2021, the series was canceled after one season.

== Contestants ==
Dog	Partner	Lives in	Chosen charity
Ace, 10 year old Border Collie	Mark LeBlanc	Salt Lake City, Utah	Best Friends Animal Society
Allister, 4+ year old Wired-Haired Rat Terrier	Daniel Reese	Chicago, Illinois	Habitat for Humanity
Bozley, 9 year old Border Collie-St Bernard mix	Mitra Najibeh Yosri	Los Angeles, California	Grand Paws Rescue
Chance, 6 year old Chihuahua and Miniature Pinscher mix	Linh Lacoma	Brooklyn, New York	Pet Rescue Pilots
Charlie, 4+ Schnauzer/ Poodle Mix	Donna Modafferi	New York, New York	Pet Partners
Derby, 4+ Year old Goldendoodle	Kioni "Kentucky" Russell Gallahue	San Diego, California	Helen Woodward Animal Center
Dixie, 5 year old Bluetick Coonhound	Brian Calvert	Camby, Indiana	Central Indiana K9 Association
Duchess, 8 year old Black Lab	Lucy Riles	Los Angeles, California	Paws with a Cause
Gryffin, 8 year old Australian Shepherd	Chelsey Lowe	Newport Beach, California	Animal Welfare Institute
Jax, 3 Year Old Golden Retriever	Vania Zuniga	Long Beach, California	Paws for Life K9 Rescue
Kepo, 3 year old Texas Blue Lacy	Chisum Joe Johnson	El Reno, Oklahoma	Muscular DystrophyAssociation
Snow, 3 year old Poodle	Joshua White	Los Angeles, California	No-Kill Los Angeles

== Episodes ==
No.	Title	Original release date
1	"Los Angeles"	November 20, 2020
2	"Mexico City"	November 20, 2020
3	"Costa Rica"	November 20, 2020
4	"Costa Rica Part 2"	November 20, 2020
5	"Vienna"	November 20, 2020
6	"Florence"	November 20, 2020
7	"Switzerland"	November 20, 2020
8	"Paris"	November 20, 2020
9	"London"	November 20, 2020
10	"USA"	November 20, 2020

== Eliminations and winner ==
Episode	1	2	3	4	5	6	7	8	9	10
Destination	Los Angeles	Mexico City	Costa Rica	Costa Rica	Vienna	Florence	Switzerland	Paris	London	Utah
Mark & Ace	SAFE	WIN	WIN	SAFE	WIN	WIN	WIN	WIN	SAFE	WON $500,000
Kentucky & Derby	WIN	SAFE	SAFE	WIN	SAFE	SAFE	WIN	WIN	WIN	2nd PLACE
Vania & Jax	SAFE	WIN	WIN	SAFE	WIN	WIN	SAFE	SAFE	SAFE	3rd PLACE
Lucy & Duchess	WIN	SAFE	SAFE	WIN	SAFE	SAFE	WIN	WIN	OUT	
Chelsey & Gryffin	SAFE	WIN	WIN	SAFE	WIN	WIN	SAFE	OUT		
Brian & Dixie	SAFE	WIN	WIN	SAFE	WIN	WIN	OUT			
Josh & Snow	WIN	SAFE	SAFE+	WIN	SAFE	OUT				
Mitra & Bozley	WIN	SAFE	SAFE	WIN	OUT					
Chisum & Kepo	SAFE	WIN	WIN	OUT						
Daniel & Allister	WIN	SAFE	OUT‡							
Donna & Charlie	WIN	OUT								
Linh & Chance	OUT									

Color Key

Team was a member of the Green Pack
Team was a member of the Blue Pack
Team was a member of the winning Pack in the Pack Challenge.
Team was a member of the losing Pack in the Pack Challenge, but survived the Elimination Challenge
Team was eliminated.
Team won immunity from the final Elimination Challenge.
Contestant was the 2nd runner up
Contestant was the 1st runner up.
Contestant was the series winner.

+ Contestant lost the elimination challenge but was not sent home due to another contestant violating safety guidelines
‡ Contestant won the elimination challenge but was sent home for violating dog/partner safety guidelines.

== Release ==
The teaser trailer was released on October 6, 2020, and the official trailer was released on November 9, 2020. The Pack premiered on Amazon Prime Video on November 20, 2020.
