= KTTW =

Television station in Sioux Falls, South Dakota

KTTW and KTTM
KTTW: Sioux Falls, South Dakota; KTTM: Huron, South Dakota; United States
- Channels for KTTW: Digital: 7 (VHF); Virtual: 7
- Channels for KTTM: Digital: 12 (VHF); Virtual: 7

Programming
- Affiliations: 7.1: TCT; for others, see § Subchannels

Ownership
- Owner: Total Christian Television; (Radiant Life Ministries, Inc.)

History
- First air date: KTTW: May 29, 1987; KTTM: August 31, 1991
- Former channel number: KTTW: Analog: 17 (UHF, 1987–2009); KTTM: Analog: 12 (VHF, 1991–2009); Digital: 22 (UHF, until 2009); Virtual: 12 (until 2020)
- Former affiliations: KTTW: Fox (1987–2020); This TV (2020–2021); Cozi TV (until 2020); KTTM: Fox (1991–2020); This TV (2020–2021)

Technical information
- Licensing authority: FCC
- Facility ID: KTTW: 28521; KTTM: 28501
- ERP: KTTW: 7.5 kW; KTTM: 12.6 kW
- HAAT: KTTW: 217.6 m (714 ft); KTTM: 257 m (843 ft)
- Transmitter coordinates: KTTW: 43°30′14″N 96°34′18.8″W; KTTM: 44°11′39.0″N 98°19′5.0″W

Links
- Public license information: KTTW: Public file; LMS; KTTM: Public file; LMS

KTTW and KTTM (channel 7) are religious television stations licensed respectively to Sioux Falls and Huron, South Dakota, United States, owned by Total Christian Television (TCT). KTTW's transmitter is located in Rowena, while KTTM's tower is near Alpena, South Dakota.

KTTM operates as a full-time satellite of KTTW; its existence is only acknowledged in station identifications.

Established as a Fox affiliate on channel 17 in 1987, KTTW was the fourth commercial station to be built in Sioux Falls and the first Fox affiliate in the state. KTTM went on the air in 1991. Its owner, Independent Communications, Inc., sold the programming and Fox affiliation, as well as its five dependent translators, to Gray Television in 2020, resulting in the establishment of Fox Sioux Falls, a subchannel of KDLT-TV. It then sold the KTTW and KTTM facilities and licenses to Radiant Life Ministries, a sister company of TCT.

== History ==
After applying on June 1, 1984, the Federal Communications Commission (FCC) granted Family Broadcasting Company, Inc., of Fairfield, Iowa, a construction permit to build a new commercial television station on channel 17 in Sioux Falls in November of that year. Work began in earnest in 1986, and the station began broadcasting on May 29, 1987. Family Broadcasting soon reorganized as Independent Communications, Inc. Upon sign-on, channel 17 affiliated with Fox, which had launched its prime time schedule only a month earlier. However, Fox did not consider itself a network at the time, but a "satellite-delivered national program service" that only carried programming on weekends. Thus, for all intents and purposes, KTTW was programmed as an independent, as was the case with most early Fox affiliates. It filled the weekday schedule with cartoons, home shopping shows, and fare from the Hit Video USA service and American Christian Television System. Chuck Poppen was the general manager, with rental company owner Jim Elmen as the major financial backer of the venture; the Elmens would own 89 percent of KTTW. Elmen recalled in 1991 that he bought into the station to give viewers a chance to see programming that had previously only been seen on cable, particularly children's programming. By then, the station had significantly upgraded its programming, airing both Star Trek: The Original Series and Star Trek: The Next Generation as well as Minnesota Twins baseball and Minnesota Timberwolves basketball.

On August 31, 1991, KTTM signed on, expanding coverage to cities including Huron and Mitchell. By this time, the station had turned the corner from what Elmen would recall as "a couple years of H-E-double-L" financially. The station moved to offices on West 11th Street in 1995, which it would occupy for 25 years. In 1997, Poppen resigned, citing differences with the majority stakeholders. After the digital television transition, in 2009, KTTW changed its branding from its former analog channel 17 to its digital physical channel of 7.

On November 2, 2020, KTTW's non-license assets were purchased by Gray Television, owner of ABC affiliate KSFY-TV (channel 13) and NBC affiliate KDLT-TV (channel 46); Fox programming moved to KDLT on digital subchannel 46.2. Cozi TV, which was also carried on KTTW, moved to subchannel 46.4. KTTW and KTTM's main channels began carrying This TV. Independent also sold five translators of KTTW, at Aberdeen, Brookings, Pierre, Watertown, and Worthington, Minnesota, to Gray for $1. (Note: KTTW had a sixth translator, K44ME-D in Lowry. That translator closed on January 31, 2019, when the Five County TV Translator District that operated it ceased operations.) According to a local business publication, Independent Communications was exiting television altogether and intended to sell or donate KTTW "to a nonprofit entity in the near future". On February 10, 2021, it was announced that Marion, Illinois–based Total Christian Television would acquire the license assets of KTTW/KTTM for $850,000. The transaction was completed on December 21; the stations switched to TCT programming the next day.

== Technical information ==
=== Subchannels ===
KTTW and KTTM both broadcast TCT and additional national multicast channels:

Subchannels of KTTW and KTTM
Subchannel	Res.	Short name	Programming
7.1	720p	KTTW HD	TCT
7.2	480i	ONTV4U	OnTV4U (Infomercials)
7.3	480i	SBN	Sonlife
7.4	480i	LAFF	Laff
7.5	480i	Bounce	Bounce TV
7.6	480i	Grit	Grit
7.7	480i	IONPlus	Ion Plus
7.8	480i	Positiv	Positiv
7.9	480i	GDT	Infomercials
7.10	480i	Quest	Quest

=== Analog-to-digital conversion ===
Both stations shut down their analog signals for the 2009 analog shutoff date:

- KTTW shut down its analog signal, over UHF channel 17; the station's digital signal broadcasts on its pre-transition VHF channel 7.
- KTTM shut down its analog signal, over VHF channel 12; the station's digital signal relocated from its pre-transition UHF channel 22 to VHF channel 12.
