= Rowena, South Dakota =

Unincorporated community in South Dakota, U.S.

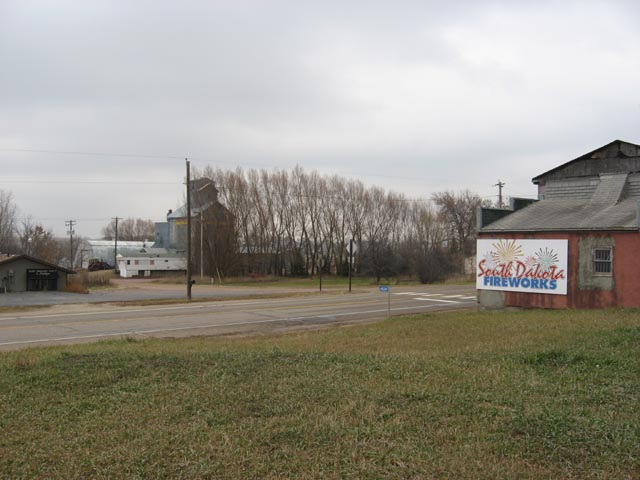
View of Rowena

Rowena (pronounced "roh-WEE'-nuh") is an unincorporated community and a census-designated place (CDP) in Minnehaha County, South Dakota, United States. The population of the CDP was 68 at the 2020 United States census. It is located along South Dakota Highway 42.

Rowena is located at 43°31′08″N 96°33′22″W, just over one mile north of the border with Iowa, approximately 5 miles (8.0 km) east of Sioux Falls, and 5 miles (8.0 km) west of the Minnesota border, at an elevation of 1,437 feet. The ZIP Code is 57056.

== Television towers ==
Two of South Dakota's tallest structures are located near Rowena: the 1,999 ft (609.2 meters) high KDLT Tower, and the slightly shorter KELO TV Tower.

== History ==
The community has the name of Rowena, a character in the novel Ivanhoe. The city was founded by the Illinois Central Railroad when it was extended to that point.

== Notable person ==
- Mamie Van Doren, actress and singer
