= List of building and structure collapses =

This is a list of non-deliberate structural failures and collapses of buildings and other structures including bridges, dams, and radio masts/towers.

== Antiquity to the Middle Ages ==
Year	Structure	Location	Type	Casualties
226 BCE	Colossus of Rhodes collapse	City of Rhodes, Island of Rhodes	Statue	
27	Fidenae amphitheatre collapse	Fidenae, Italia, Roman Empire	Amphitheatre	~20,000 dead
ca. 27–30	Tower of Siloam	Jerusalem, Judea, Roman Empire	Tower	18 dead
140	Upper tier collapse of the Circus Maximus	Rome, Italia, Roman Empire	Amphitheatre	~13,000 dead
312	Milvian Bridge	Rome, Italy	Bridge	
558	Dome of Hagia Sophia	Constantinople, Byzantine Empire	Church	
1091	London Bridge	London, England	Bridge	
1124	Easter House of Tairrdelbach Ua Conchobair	Tara, Ireland	Temporary hall	Unknown
1184	Erfurt Cathedral	Erfurt, Holy Roman Empire	Church	~60 dead
1275	St. Servatius Bridge	Maastricht, Netherlands	Bridge	~400 dead
1284	Choir of Beauvais Cathedral	Beauvais, France	Church	
1303	Lighthouse of Alexandria	Alexandria, Mamluk Sultanate (now Egypt)	Tower	
1322	Ely Cathedral Tower collapse	Ely, Cambridgeshire, England	Church	
1342	Judith Bridge	Prague, Kingdom of Bohemia	Bridge	
1382	Bell tower of St. Mary's Church	Stralsund, Duchy of Pomerania, Hanseatic League	Church	
1444	Rialto Bridge	Venice, Republic of Venice	Bridge	
1500	Malmesbury Abbey	Malmesbury, Wiltshire, England	Church	
1529	St Elizabeth's Church	Breslau, Silesia, Hapsburg lands, Holy Roman Empire (now Poland)	Church	
1549	Lincoln Cathedral	Lincoln, Lincolnshire, England	Church	
1573	Tower of Beauvais Cathedral	Beauvais, France	Church	
1577	Martinikerk	Groningen, free city, Spanish Netherlands	Church	

== 17th–19th centuries ==
Year	Structure	Location	Type	Casualties
1625	Tower of St. Olaf's Church	Tallinn, Sweden (now Estonia)	Church	
1647	Tower of St. Mary's Church	Stralsund, Duchy of Pomerania	Church	
1661	Tower of St. Reinold's Church	Dortmund, Hanseatic League	Church	
1666	St. Peter's Church	Riga, Sweden (now Latvia)	Church	8 buried in rubble
17th century	Abbaye-aux-Hommes	Caen, France	Church	
1674	Nave of the Dom Church	Utrecht, Netherlands	Church	
1697	Tower of St. Michael's Church	Klausenburg, Habsburg monarchy (now Romania)	Church	
1713	St. Mary's Church	Twickenham, England, Great Britain	Church	
ca. 1715	Marsalforn Tower	Xagħra, Gozo, Malta	Tower	
1721	St. Peter's Church	Riga, Sweden/Russia (now Latvia)	Church	
1763	Tower of St. Michael's Church	Klausenburg, Habsburg monarchy (now Romania)	Church	
1807	Eitai Bridge	Tokyo, Japan	Bridge	500–2,000 dead
1809	Ponte das Barcas	Porto, Portugal	Bridge	4,000 dead
1821	Saalebrücke bei Mönchen-Nienburg	Nienburg, Germany	Bridge	55 dead
1831	Broughton Suspension Bridge	Broughton, Greater Manchester, England, UK	Bridge	20 injured
1845	Yarmouth suspension bridge	Great Yarmouth, Norfolk, England, UK	Bridge	79 dead
1847	Dee bridge disaster	Chester, England, UK	Bridge	5 dead, 9 injured
1850	Angers Bridge	Angers, Maine-et-Loire, France	Bridge	226 dead
1854	Wheeling Suspension Bridge	Wheeling, West Virginia, United States	Bridge	
1860	Pemberton Mill	Lawrence, Massachusetts, US		~145 dead, ~166 injured
1860	Wootton bridge collapse	Wootton, Warwickshire, England, UK	Bridge	2 dead
1860	Bull bridge accident	Ambergate, Derbyshire, England, UK	Bridge	
1861	Chichester Cathedral spire collapse	Chichester, West Sussex, UK	Church	
1863	Chunky Creek Bridge	between Meridian and Vicksburg, Mississippi, United States	Bridge	
1864	Dale Dike Reservoir	South Yorkshire, England, UK	Dam	240+ dead
1868	Saint Peter's Church spire collapse	Fritzlar, Hesse, Prussia, North German Confederation	Church	21 dead, 31 injured
1870	1870 Virginia Capitol collapse	Richmond, Virginia, US	Government building	62 dead, 251 injured
1873	Dixon Bridge Disaster	Dixon, Illinois, United States	Bridge	46 dead, 56 injured
1876	Ashtabula River railroad disaster	Ashtabula, Ohio, US		92 dead, 64 injured
1879	Tay Bridge disaster	Dundee, Scotland	Bridge	~75 dead, with 60 known
1887	Bussey bridge disaster	Boston, Massachusetts, US	Bridge	23 dead, 100+ injured
1888	Big Four Bridge	Kentucky, United States	Bridge	37 dead
1889	South Fork Dam	Johnstown, Pennsylvania, US	Dam	2,209 dead
1890	Walnut Grove Dam	Wickenburg, Arizona Territory, US	Dam	100–150 dead
1891	Münchenstein rail disaster	Münchenstein, Basel-Landschaft, Switzerland	Bridge	73 dead, 171 injured
1895	Ireland Building	New York City, New York, US	Office building	16 dead, 12 injured
1896	Point Ellice Bridge disaster	Victoria, British Columbia, Canada	Bridge	55 dead
1897	Maddur Railway Bridge	Maddur, India	Bridge	150 dead

== 1900–1949 ==
Year	Structure	Location	Type	Casualties
1900	1900 Big Game disaster	San Francisco, California, United States	Factory	23 dead, 100+ injured
1902	St. Mark's Campanile	Venice, Italy		
1902	Ibrox disaster	Glasgow, Scotland, UK	Stadium	25 dead, 500+ injured
1903	North Inch disaster	Perth, Scotland, UK	Stadium	150+ injured
1904	Eden railroad bridge collapse	Eden, Colorado, US	Bridge	111 dead
1905	Egyptian Bridge	Saint Petersburg, Russia	Bridge	
1905	Portage Canal Swing Bridge	Houghton, Michigan, United States	Bridge	
1905	Grover Shoe Factory	Brockton, Massachusetts, US	Factory	58 dead, 150 injured
1906	National Electric Signaling Company mast	Machrihanish, Scotland	Guyed mast	
1906	Amsden Building	Framingham, Massachusetts, U.S.	Office building	13 dead, 8 injured
1907	Quebec Bridge	Quebec City, Quebec, Canada	Bridge	75 dead, 11 injured
1911	Romanov Bridge	Zelenodolsk, Russian Empire	Bridge	13 dead
1912	Mast of Nauen Transmitter Station	Nauen, Germany	Radio tower	
1915	Division Street Bridge	Spokane, Washington, US	Bridge	5 dead, 12 injured
1916	Quebec Bridge	Quebec City, Canada	Bridge	13 dead
1919	Molasses Tank	Boston, Massachusetts, US	Tank	21 dead, 150 injured
1921	Shukhov Tower (under construction)	Moscow, Russia	Radio tower	
1922	Knickerbocker Theatre	Washington, D.C., US	Cinema building	98 dead, 133 injured
1925	Three masts of Norddeich Transmitting Station	Norddeich, Germany	Radio tower	
1925	Pickwick Club	Boston, Massachusetts, US	Building	44 dead, 24 injured
1927	Western mast of Deutschlandsender Zeesen	Zeesen, Germany	Guyed mast	
1928	St. Francis Dam	Santa Clarita, California, US	Dam	~600 dead
1930	Towers of Sender Stadelheim	Munich, Germany	Radio tower	
1935	Wooden tower of Rundfunksender Langenberg	Langenberg (Rheinland), Germany	Radio tower	
1937	New London School	New London, Texas, US	School	~300 dead
1938	Kugaiza Cinema collapse	Tokamachi, Niigata, Japan	Cinema building	69 dead, 92 injured
1939	Sandö Bridge	Kramfors, Ångermanland, Sweden	Bridge	18 dead
1939	Collapse of Utbremen Radio Tower	Bremen, Germany	Radio tower	
1940	First Tacoma Narrows Bridge	Tacoma, Washington, US	Bridge	
1940	Theodor Heuss Bridge	Ludwigshafen, Germany	Bridge	
1945	Hindenburg Bridge	Cologne, Germany	Bridge	Unknown
1945	Ludendorff Bridge	Remagen, Germany	Bridge	~18–33 dead, ~63–93 injured
1949	Two masts of the Langenberg transmission tower	Langenberg (Rheinland), Germany	Radio tower	
1949	Inotani wire bridge	Toyama, Toyama, Japan	Bridge	29 dead
1949	Mast of the Transmitter Hamburg-Billstedt	Hamburg, West Germany	Radio tower	

== 1950–1979 ==
Year	Structure	Location	Type	Casualties
1951	Duplessis bridge collapse	Quebec, Canada	Bridge	4 dead
1953	Tangiwai Bridge	Tangiwai, New Zealand	Bridge	151 dead
1957	WSM-TV Tower	Nashville, Tennessee, US	Guyed mast (under construction)	4 dead
1957	Rail bridge near St Johns railway station	Lewisham, London, UK	Bridge	90 dead, 173 injured
1958	Second Narrows Bridge	Vancouver, British Columbia, Canada	Bridge	19 dead
1958	LORAN-C transmitter Carolina Beach	Carolina Beach, North Carolina, US	Radio tower	
1958	Collapse of the Ochsenkopf Transmitter	Ochsenkopf, Germany	Guyed mast	
1959	Vega de Tera	Ribadelago, Spain	Dam	144 dead
1959	Malpasset	Côte d'Azur, France	Dam	423 dead
1959	October cinema collapse	Bryansk, USSR	Cinema	46 dead, at least 123 injured
1960	KOBR-TV Tower	Caprock, New Mexico, US	Guyed mast	
1962	LORAN-C transmitter Ejde	Ejde, Faroe Islands, Denmark	Radio tower	
1962	King Street Bridge	Melbourne, Victoria, Australia	Bridge	
1963	Beaver Dam Bridge	Murdochville, Quebec, Canada	Bridge	6 dead
1963	Vajont Dam	Friuli-Venezia Giulia, Italy	Dam	~1,900–2,500 dead
1963	Baldwin Hills Reservoir	Los Angeles, California, US	Dam	5 dead
1964	General Rafael Urdaneta Bridge	Maracaibo, Venezuela	Bridge	
1965	Mast of Iwo Jima LORAN-C transmitter	Iwo Jima, Ogasawara Subprefecture, Japan	Radio tower	6 dead
1966	Heron Road Bridge	Ottawa, Ontario, Canada	Bridge	9 dead, 60+ injured
1967	Swidnica Town Hall Tower	Swidnica, Poland	Tower	
1967	Queen Juliana Bridge	Willemstad, Curaçao	Bridge	15 dead
1967	Waltham transmitting station	Waltham, UK	Guyed mast	
1967	Silver Bridge	Point Pleasant, West Virginia, US	Bridge	46 dead
1968	Ronan Point collapse	London, UK	High rise	4 dead, 17 injured
1968	KELO TV Tower	Rowena, South Dakota, US	Guyed mast	
1969	FM-/TV-Mast of Marnach transmitter	Marnach, Luxembourg	Guyed mast	
1969	Emley Moor TV mast collapse	Emley, West Yorkshire, UK	Guyed mast	
1970	Orlunda radio transmitter central mast collapse	Orlunda, Sweden	Guyed mast	
1970	West Gate Bridge	Melbourne, Australia	Bridge	35 dead, 18 injured
1970	Britannia Bridge	Menai Strait, Wales, UK	Bridge	
1970	Cleddau Bridge	Pembroke Dock and Neyland, Wales, UK	Bridge	4 dead, 5 injured
1970	Wau Apartment collapse	Seoul, South Korea	Residential building	34 dead, 40 injured
1971	2000 Commonwealth Avenue collapse	Boston, Massachusetts, US	Condominium building under construction	4 dead, 30 injured
1971	South Bridge	Koblenz, Rhineland-Palatinate, West Germany	Bridge under construction	13 dead, 13 injured
1971	1971 Certej dam failure	Certeju de Sus, Hunedoara County, Romania	Dam	89 dead, 76 injured
1972	Buffalo Creek Flood	West Virginia, US	Dam	125 dead, 1,121 injured
1972	Königs Wusterhausen Central Tower	Königs Wusterhausen, East Germany	Lattice tower	
1973	Skyline Towers collapse	Bailey's Crossroads, Virginia, US	Building under construction	14 dead, 35 injured
1973	Broadway Central Hotel, Mercer Arts Center	New York, NY, US	Hotel and theaters	4 dead, at least 12 injured
1973	Zeulenroda Artificial Lake bridge	Zeulenroda, East Germany (GDR)	Bridge (under construction)	4 dead
1974	Makahali River bridge	Baitadi, Nepal	Bridge	140 dead
1974	Miami DEA building collapse	Miami, US	4-story office building	7 dead
1975	Tasman Bridge disaster	Hobart, Tasmania, Australia	Bridge	12 dead
1975	Banqiao and Shimantan Dams	Zhumadian, Henan, China	Dam	~85,600 to 240,000 dead
1976	Teton Dam	Idaho, US	Earthen dam	11 dead
1976	Sendeanlage Burg SL-3	Burg bei Magdeburg, Saxony-Anhalt, East Germany	Guyed mast	
1976	Reichsbrücke	Vienna, Austria	Bridge	1 dead
1976	Pic de Nore transmitter	Pic de Nore, France	Guyed mast	
1977	KSLA-TV Tower	Mooringsport, Louisiana, US	Guyed mast	
1977	Kelly Barnes Dam	Georgia, US	Dam	39 dead
1977	Granville rail disaster	Granville, NSW, Australia	Bridge	83 dead (including an unborn child), 213 injured
1977	Pushkino bridge collapse	Pushkino, Moscow Oblast, USSR	Bridge	23 dead, 125 injured
1978	Hartford Civic Center	Hartford, Connecticut, US	Arena	
1978	Sender Zehlendorf	Zehlendorf bei Oranienburg, East Germany	Guyed mast	
1978	Willow Island Cooling Tower	Willow Island, West Virginia, US	Cooling tower under construction	51 dead
1978	Connor Hotel	Joplin, Missouri, US	Hotel slated for demolition	2 dead, 1 injured
1979	Penmanshiel Tunnel	Grantshouse, Scottish Borders, UK	Tunnel	2 dead
1979	Kemper Arena	Kansas City, Missouri, US	Stadium	
1979	Sender Krasch	Bernklau, Czechoslovakia (now part of Czech Republic)	Guyed mast	
1979	Blåbärskullen transmitter	Sunne, Sweden	Pinnacle of guyed mast	

== 1980–1999 ==
Year	Structure	Location	Type	Casualties
1980	Almö Bridge	Stenungsund, Sweden	Bridge	8 dead
1980	Corralejas stadium collapse	Sincelejo, Sucre, Colombia	Stadium	200+ dead
1980	Hayakawa wire bridge	Saito, Kyūshū, Japan	Bridge (suspension)	7 dead
1980	House of World Cultures	West Berlin, West Germany	Building	1 dead
1980	Sunshine Skyway Bridge	Tampa Bay, Florida, US	Bridge	35 dead
1981	Harbor Cay Condominium collapse	Cocoa Beach, Florida, US	Building	11 dead, 23 injured
1981	Hyatt Regency walkway collapse	Kansas City, Missouri, US	Walkway	114 dead, 216 injured
1981	Chimney of Matla Power Station	Mpumalanga, South Africa	Chimney	4 dead
1982	Aviamotornaya escalator collapse	Moscow, Russian SFSR, Soviet Union	Escalator	8 dead, 30 injured
1982	Lawn Lake Dam	Rocky Mountain National Park, Colorado, US	Dam	3 dead
1982	Tous Dam	Valencia, Spain	Dam	30+ dead or injured
1982	Senior Road Tower collapse	Missouri City, Texas, US	Guyed mast	5 dead
1982	Sophia Gardens Pavilion	Cardiff, Wales, UK	Concert hall	
1983	Mianus River Bridge	Greenwich, Connecticut, US	Bridge	3 dead, 3 injured
1983	CKX-TV Craig Television Tower	Souris, Manitoba, Canada	Guyed mast	
1983	Wavre TV Mast	Wavre, Belgium	Guyed mast	
1983	Kurgan dormitory collapse	Kurgan, USSR	Dormitory	15 dead
1985	Val di Stava Dam collapse	Italy	Dam	268 dead
1985	Apartment building collapse	Castellaneta, Italy	Apartment building	21 dead, 9 injured
1986	Hotel New World Disaster	Little India near Serangoon Road, Singapore	Hotel	33 dead, 17 injured
1987	L'Ambiance Plaza collapse	Bridgeport, Connecticut, US	Residential tower	28 dead
1987	Schoharie Creek Bridge collapse	Fort Hunter, New York, US	Bridge	10 dead
1988	Dzhrashen School	Spitak, Armenian Soviet Socialist Republic	Elementary school	400 dead
1988	Multrå transmitter	Sollefteå, Sweden	Pinnacle of guyed mast	
1988	Mainbrücke Stockstadt (Aschaffenburg Main River Freeway Bridge)	Aschaffenburg, Bavaria, West Germany	Bridge under construction	1 dead
1988	Station Square collapse (Save-On-Foods collapse)	Burnaby, British Columbia, Canada	Rooftop parking structure	21 injured
1988	Sultan Abdul Halim ferry terminal bridge	Butterworth, Penang, Malaysia	Bridge	
1988	Green Bank Telescope	Green Bank, West Virginia, US	Parabolic dish (diameter: 90.44 m (297 ft))	
1989	Tennessee Hatchie River Bridge	Tennessee, US	Bridge	8 dead
1989	Civic Tower	Italy	Tower	4 dead, 15 injured
1989	Cypress Street Viaduct	Oakland, California, US	Bridge	42 dead
1991	Astram Line steel bridge	Hiroshima, Japan	Bridge	15 dead
1991	Festival Pier	London, England, UK	Pier	
1991	Warsaw Radio Mast collapse	Gąbin, Poland	Guyed mast (646 m (2,119 ft))	
1992	Armand Césari Stadium disaster	Bastia, Haute-Corse, France	Stadium	18 dead, 2,300+ injured
1993	Cape Race LORAN-C transmitter mast collapse	Cape Race, Newfoundland and Labrador, Canada	Mast	
1993	Collapse of the Royal Plaza Hotel	Nakhon Ratchasima, Thailand	Hotel	137 dead, 227 injured
1993	Highland Towers collapse (Block 1)	Selangor, Malaysia	Residential tower	48 dead, unknown injured
1994	Casino supermarket collapse	Nice, France	Roof of the commercial building	2 dead, 94 injured
1994	Retirement home collapse	Motta Visconti, Italy	Retirement home	27 dead
1994	Marja store collapse	Tallinn, Estonia	Commercial building	5 dead
1994	Seongsu Bridge disaster	Seoul, South Korea	Bridge	32 dead, 17 injured
1995	Cave Creek disaster	Paparoa National Park, New Zealand	Viewing platform	14 dead, 4 injured
1995	Sampoong Department Store collapse	Seoul, South Korea	Commercial building	502 dead, 937 injured
1995	Taganrog Iron & Steel Factory collapse	Taganrog, Russia	Factory	14 dead, 17 injured
1996	Baikong Railway bridge	Ruyuan County, Guangdong, China	Bridge	29 dead
1996	Koror-Babeldaob Bridge	Koror and Babeldaob, Palau	Bridge	2 dead
1996	Walnut Street Bridge collapse	Harrisburg, Pennsylvania, US	Bridge	
1997	Opuha Dam	New Zealand	Dam	
1997	Maccabiah bridge collapse	Tel Aviv, Israel	Bridge	4 dead, 62 injured
1997	University of Virginia Lawn pavilion	Charlottesville, Virginia	Balcony collapse	1 dead, 24 injured
1997	KXJB-TV mast collapse	Traill County, North Dakota, US	Guyed mast	
1997	WLBT Tower collapse	Raymond, Mississippi, US	Tower	3 dead
1997	Knick-Ei	Halstenbek, Germany	Sports hall	
1998	Palace II collapse	Rio de Janeiro, Brazil	Residential tower	8 dead
1998	Knick-Ei	Halstenbek, Germany	Sports hall	
1998	Chimney of Rutenberg Power Station	Ashkelon, Israel	Chimney (under construction)	9 dead
1998	Eschede train disaster	Eschede, Germany	Bridge	101 dead, 88 injured
1998	Nalchik sport center balcony collapse	Nalchik, Russia	Balcony in sport center	23 dead, 47 injured
1999	Gdynia Shipyard crane crash	Gdynia, Poland	Crane	
1999	Via Giotto in Foggia building collapse	Foggia, Italy	Residential building	67 dead, 3 injured
1999	Aggie Bonfire collapse	College Station, Texas, US	Bonfire	12 dead, 27 injured
1999	Big Blue Crane collapse	Milwaukee, Wisconsin, US	Crane	3 dead, 5 Injured
1999	Ricomex Factory collapse	Mount Parnitha, Athens, Greece	Factory	39 dead

== 2000–2009 ==
Year	Structure	Location	Type	Casualties
2000	2000 Baia Mare cyanide spill	Baia Mare, Romania	Embankment dam	
2000	Pier Number 34 (Club Heat)	Philadelphia, Pennsylvania, US	Pier converted to nightclub	3 dead, dozens injured
2000	Boulevard du Souvenir overpass collapse over Highway 15	Laval, Quebec, Canada	Overpass	1 dead, 2 injured
2000	1601 Park Avenue apartment building collapse	Los Angeles, California	Residential apartment building	1 dead, 36 injured
2000	Hoan Bridge	Milwaukee, Wisconsin, US	Bridge	
2000	Lowe's Motor Speedway	Concord, North Carolina, US	Bridge	107 Injured
2001	Hintze Ribeiro Bridge	Entre-os-Rios, Castelo de Paiva, Portugal	Bridge	59 dead
2001	Versailles wedding hall collapse	Jerusalem, Israel	Wedding hall	23 dead, 380 injured
2001	Queen Isabella Causeway	Port Isabel and South Padre Island, Texas, US	Bridge	8 dead
2001	1, 2, and 7 World Trade Center (Note: 1 and 2 World Trade Center were targeted in deliberate airplane crashes by al-Qaeda as part of the September 11 attacks. However, in a December 13, 2001 video recording, al-Qaeda emir Osama bin Laden stated that he had only expected the floors above the impact zones to collapse rather than completely destroying all three buildings.)	Manhattan, New York, US	Buildings	2296 dead
2001	Kadalundi River rail bridge	India	Bridge	57 dead
2002	Buran hangar collapse	Baikonur, Kazakhstan/Russia	Hangar	8 dead
2002	I-40 bridge disaster	Webbers Falls, Oklahoma, US	Bridge	14 dead, 11 injured
2002	VertiGo	Sandusky, Ohio, US	Amusement ride	
2003	Hengzhou Towers	Hengyang, China	Mixed-use apartment	20 dead
2003	Silver Lake Dam failure	Marquette County, Michigan, US	Embankment dam	
2003	Kinzua Bridge	Kinzua Bridge State Park, Pennsylvania, US	Bridge	
2003	2003 Chicago balcony collapse	Chicago, Illinois, US	Balcony	13 dead, 57 injured
2004	Big Bay Dam	Mississippi, US	Dam	
2004	Camará Dam	Brazil	Dam	At least 3 dead
2004	Collapse of the Terminal 2E roof, Charles de Gaulle Airport	Roissy-en-France, Val-d'Oise, France	Airport terminal	4 dead, 3 injured
2004	Transvaal Park	Moscow, Russia	Water park	28 dead, 193 injured
2004	Igor I. Sikorsky Memorial Bridge crane collapse	Connecticut, US	Bridge-deconstruction crane	1 dead
2004	Peterborough radio mast	Peterborough, Cambridgeshire, England, UK	Guyed mast	
2004	Nicoll Highway collapse	Kallang, Singapore	Tunnel under construction	4 dead, 3 injured
2004	Sai Building	Tondo, Manila, Philippines	8th-story building	
2005	Shakidor Dam	Pakistan	Dam	~70 dead
2005	Margalla Towers	Islamabad, Pakistan	Residential building	78 dead, 100+ injured
2005	Taum Sauk Reservoir	Lesterville, Missouri, US	Dam	5 injured
2005	School No. 4	Zverevo, Rostov Oblast, Russia	School	3 dead, 1 injured
2005	Gerrards Cross Tunnel	Gerrards Cross, Buckinghamshire, England, UK	Tunnel	
2005	Sadaf Manzil	Nagpada, Mumbai, India	Residential building	11 dead, 24 injured
2005	Chusovoy swimming pool collapse	Chusovoy, Russia	Swimming pool	14 dead, 11 injured
2006	Bad Reichenhall Ice Rink roof collapse	Bad Reichenhall, Germany	Stadium roof	15 dead, 32 injured
2006	Katowice Trade Hall roof collapse	Katowice, Poland	Market roof	65 dead, 170 injured
2006	Basmanny market roof collapse	Moscow, Russia	Market roof	66 dead, unknown injured
2006	2006 Lagos building collapses	Lagos, Nigeria	Three buildings – a residential building , commercial building, and a building under construction	At least 28 dead, at least 86 injured
2006	Interstate 88 bridge collapse	Unadilla, New York, US	Bridge	2 dead
2006	Big Dig ceiling collapse	South Boston, Massachusetts, US	Ceiling tile	1 dead, 1 injured
2006	De la Concorde overpass collapse	Laval, Quebec, Canada	Overpass	5 dead, 6 injured
2007	Crab House – Floor collapsed into the water	Wildwood Crest, New Jersey, US	Building	9 injured
2007	Neurath Power Station Scaffold collapse	Grevenbroich-Neurath, Germany	Power station under construction	3 dead, 6 injured
2007	WNEP-TV Tower	Penobscot Knob, Mountaintop, Pennsylvania, US	Guyed mast	
2007	I-35W Mississippi River bridge collapse	Minneapolis, Minnesota, US	Bridge	13 dead, 145 injured
2007	Collapse of bridge over the Jiantuo River during construction	Hunan, China	Bridge	50+ dead, ~90+ injured
2007	Collapse of Cần Thơ Bridge	Cần Thơ, Vietnam	Bridge	52–59+ dead, 140–189+ injured
2007	Estádio Fonte Nova	Salvador, Brazil	Stadium	7 dead, 40 injured
2007	Charleston Sofa Super Store	Charleston, South Carolina, U.S.	Furniture store	9 firefighters killed, 18 injured
2008	Hornslet wind-turbine collapse	Hornslet, Denmark	Wind turbine	
2008	303 East 51st Street crane collapse	Manhattan, New York City, US	Crane	7 dead, 24 injured
2008	Belyayevka School	Belyayevka, Orenburg Oblast, Russia	School	5 dead, 4 injured
2008	Christian rock concert stage collapse	Abbotsford, British Columbia, Canada	Stage	40+ injured
2009	Historical Archive of the City of Cologne collapse	Cologne, North Rhine-Westphalia, Germany	Building	2 dead
2009	Collapse of Lotus Riverside Block 7	Shanghai, China	Residential building	1 dead
2009	Broadmeadow viaduct	Malahide, Ireland	Bridge	
2009	Sultan Mizan Zainal Abidin Stadium	Terengganu, Malaysia	Stadium	
2009	2009 Korba chimney collapse	Korba, Chhattisgarh, India	Chimney	At least 45 dead, 7+ injured
2009	Big Valley Jamboree stage collapse	Camrose, Alberta, Canada	Stage	1 dead, ~75 injured
2009	Jaya Supermarket	Petaling Jaya, Malaysia	Supermarket	7 dead, unknown injured
2009	Kota Chambal Bridge collapse	Kota, India	Bridge	48 dead, unknown injured

== 2010–2019 ==
Year	Structure	Location	Type	Casualties
2010	Collapse of 45J Ma Tau Wai Road	Hong Kong	Building	4 dead
2010	Bab Berdieyinne Mosque minaret collapse	Meknes, Fès-Meknès, Morocco	Religious building	41 dead
2010	Myllysilta (Mill Bridge)	Turku, Southwest Finland, Finland	Bridge	0
2010	Lalita Park building collapse	New Delhi, India	Building	67+ dead, 73+ injured
2010	Hubert H. Humphrey Metrodome roof collapse	Minneapolis, Minnesota, US	Stadium roof	0
2010	Ikeja City Mall	Lagos, Nigeria	Mall	5 injured
2010	Stadium Southland	Invercargill, South Island, New Zealand	Stadium roof	0
2011	Lift bridge Waddinxveen	Waddinxveen, Netherlands	Bridge	
2011	WEAU-TV, WAXX-FM Tower	Fairchild, Wisconsin, US	Guyed mast	None
2011	De Grolsch Veste stadium roof collapse	Enschede, Overijssel, Netherlands	Stadium roof	2 dead, 14 injured
2011	Ottawa Bluesfest stage collapse	Ottawa, Ontario, Canada	Stage	3 injured
2011	Indiana State Fair stage collapse	Indianapolis, Indiana, US	Stage	7 dead, 58 injured
2011	Pukkelpop stage collapse	Hasselt, Flemish Community, Belgium	Stage	5 dead, 140+ injured
2011	QAL scaffold collapse	Gladstone, Queensland, Australia	Scaffold	
2011	PGC Building collapse	Christchurch, South Island New Zealand	Commercial building	18 dead
2011	Canterbury Television Building collapse	Christchurch, South Island New Zealand	Commercial building	115 dead (collapsed during earthquake)
2011	Kutai Kartanegara Bridge Collapse	Kutai Kartanegara Regency, Indonesia	Bridge	20 dead, 39 injured
2011	O'key hypermarket collapse	Saint Petersburg, Russia	Shopping mall	1 dead, 10 injured
2012	Vieira Fazenda office block collapse	Praça Floriano, Rio de Janeiro, Brazil	Office buildings	17 dead
2012	Eggner's Ferry Bridge collapse	Aurora, Kentucky, US	Bridge	No injuries
2012	Radiohead stage collapse	Toronto, Ontario, Canada	Stage	1 dead, 3 injured
2012	Algo Centre Mall	Elliot Lake, Ontario, Canada	Shopping mall	2 dead, 22 injured
2012	Miami Dade College parking garage	Miami, Florida, US	Parking garage	4 dead, 7 injured
2012	Longwave transmitter Europe 1, Mast 2	Felsberg-Berus, Saarland, Germany	Guyed radio mast	
2012	Sasago Tunnel	Border of Kōshū and Ōtsuki, Yamanashi Prefecture, Japan	Ceiling tile	9 dead, 2 injured
2013	Dar es Salaam building collapse	Dar es Salaam, Tanzania	Residential building	36 dead, 17/18 injured
2013	Thane building collapse	Thane, Mumbai, Maharashtra, India	Building under construction	74 dead, 60–62 injured
2013	Rana Plaza collapse	Savar, Dhaka, Bangladesh	Commercial building	1,134 dead, 2,500+ injured
2013	22nd and Market building collapse	Philadelphia, Pennsylvania, US	Building	6 dead, 13 injured
2013	Penang Second Bridge	Penang Island, Malaysia	Bridge	1 dead, 3 injured
2013	Row houses collapse 400 block of Daly Street	Philadelphia, Pennsylvania, US	Row houses	8 injured
2013	I-5 Skagit River Bridge collapse	Skagit County, Washington, US	Bridge	3 injured
2013	Building under construction	Sao Paulo, Brazil	Building	At least 6 dead, at least 20 injured
2013	Residential building	Mumbai, India	Building	At least 61 dead, at least 32 injured
2013	Collapse of the Space Building	Medellín, Colombia	Residential building	12 dead
2013	Maxima superstore	Riga, Latvia	Commercial building	54 dead
2013	Apollo Theatre	London, UK	Theatre	76 injured
2014	Gyeongju Mauna Resort Gymnasium collapse	Gyeongju, North Gyeongsang Province, South Korea	Gymnasium	10 dead, 124 injured
2014	Downtown Murray building collapse	Murray, Kentucky, US	Building	No injuries
2014	Death of Keane Wallis-Bennett	Edinburgh, Scotland	Freestanding wall	1
2014	Croce del Papa collapse	Cevo, Italy	Guyed mast (inclined)	1 dead
2014	P'yŏngch'ŏn apartment block collapse	Pyongyang, North Korea	Building	100+ dead (unconfirmed)
2014	Vilémov Bridge collapse	Vilémov, Czechia	Bridge	4 dead (cs)
2014	Synagogue Church building collapse	Lagos, Nigeria	Building	115 dead
2015	Military training center barracks	Omsk, Russia	Building	23 dead
2015	I-10 bridge collapse	Desert Center, California, US	Bridge	1 injured
2015	Mecca crane collapse	Mecca, Makkah Province, Saudi Arabia	Crane	118 dead, 394 injured
2015	Dharahara (earthquake, 25 May)	Kathmandu, Nepal	19th-century tower	200 dead
2015	Mariana dam disaster	Mariana, Minas Gerais, Brazil	Tailings dam	19 dead, ~16 injured
2016	Weiguan Jinlong (earthquake, 6 Feb)	Tainan, Taiwan	Residential building	114 dead
2016	Perkolo Bridge (sv)	Nord-Fron Municipality (near Sjoe in Sel Municipality), Norway	Bridge, with trusses and glued laminated timber	1 injured
2016	2016 Lagos building collapse	Lagos, Nigeria	Building under construction	34+ dead, 13+ injured
2016	Vivekananda Flyover Bridge	Kolkata, West Bengal, India	Flyover bridge	
2016	Hu Fa Kuang Sports Centre, City University of Hong Kong	Kowloon Tong, Hong Kong	Roof collapse	3 injured
2016	Fengcheng power station collapse	Fengcheng, Jiangxi, China	Cooling tower under construction	74 dead, 2 injured
2016	Copper Lounge building collapse	Sioux Falls, South Dakota, US	Building	1 dead, 1 injured
2016	Uyo Church collapse	Uyo, Nigeria	Church	60 dead
2017	Juice Tank	Lebedyan, Russia	Tank	0
2017	Plasco Building	Tehran, Iran	Shopping mall	21 dead, 70 injured, 1 missing
2017	Troja Pedestrian Bridge collapse	Prague, Czechia	Bridge	4 injured
2017	Eindhoven Airport parking garage collapse	Eindhoven, Netherlands	Building under construction	0
2017	Interstate 85 bridge collapse	Atlanta, Georgia, US	Overpass	0
2017	Highway overpass collapse during maintenance works	Camerano, Italy	Highway overpass	2 dead, 3 injured
2018	Merriweather Post Pavilion collapse	Columbia, Maryland, US	Pavilion	0
2018	Indonesia Stock Exchange floor collapse	Jakarta, Indonesia	Suspended walkway	72 injured
2018	Chirajara bridge collapse	Chirajara, Colombia	Partially constructed motorway bridge	9 dead, 5 injured
2018	Cirebon dance hall collapse	Cirebon, West Java, Indonesia	Building	7 dead
2018	Yun Tsui residential building collapse	Hualien City, Taiwan	Residential building	14 dead
2018	Florida International University pedestrian bridge collapse	Miami, Florida, United States	Walkway	6 dead, 9 injured
2018	Edifício Wilton Paes de Almeida collapse	São Paulo, Brazil	Building	At least 7 dead
2018	Kundal Shahi bridge collapse	Kundal Shahi, Azad Kashmir, Pakistan	Walkway	At least 12 dead, 11 injured, unknown missing
2018	Zhejiang bridge collapse	Zhejiang, China	Bridge	8 dead, 3 injured
2018	Ponte Morandi collapse	Genoa, Italy	Highway bridge	43 dead, 16 injured
2018	San Giuseppe dei Falegnami collapse	Rome, Italy	Church	0
2018	2018 Magnitogorsk building collapse	Magnitogorsk, Chelyabinsk Oblast, Russia	Apartment building	39 dead, 17 injured
2018	2018 Marseille building collapse	Marseille, France	Apartment building	8 dead, 2 injured
2019	2019 Lagos school collapse	Lagos, Nigeria	Residential building	20 dead, over 60 injured
2019	Notre-Dame de Paris fire	Paris, France	Cathedral roof and spire collapse	3 injured
2019	Sihanoukville building collapse	Sihanoukville, Cambodia	Partially constructed building collapse	28 dead, 26 injured
2019	Montana State University gym roofs collapse	Bozeman, Montana, United States	2 gymnasiums	0
2019	Building collapse in Mumbai	Mumbai, India	Residential building	14 dead
2019	Dharwad building collapse	Dharwad, India	commercial complex	19 dead, 82 injured
2019	AFAS Stadion roof collapse	Alkmaar, Netherlands	Stadium roof	0
2019	Hard Rock Hotel collapse	New Orleans, United States	Partially constructed hotel collapse	3 dead, 18 injured
2019	Mirepoix-sur-Tarn bridge collapse	Mirepoix-sur-Tarn, Occitanie, France	Bridge	2 dead
2019	Brumadinho dam disaster	Brumadinho, Brazil	Tailings dam	270 dead

== 2020–present ==
Year	Structure	Location	Type	Casualties
2020	Kep building collapse	Kep, Cambodia	Tourist guesthouse under construction	36 dead, 26 injured
2020	Palmerah West Jakarta four-story building collapse	Jakarta, Indonesia	Building	11 injured
2020	Collapse of Xinjia Express Hotel	Quanzhou, Fujian, China	Hotel	29 dead, 42 injured
2020	Caprigliola bridge collapse	Caprigliola, Tuscany, Italy	Bridge	2 injured
2020	Lecheng Bridge	Sanxi, Jingde County, Anhui, China	1543-c. 1700 bridge as a tourist attraction	0 dead or injured
2020	Zhenhai Bridge	Huangshan City, Anhui, China	1536-1699 bridge as a tourist attraction	0 dead or injured
2020	Collapse of Juxian Restaurant	Linfen City, Shanxi, China	Building	29 dead, 28 injured
2020	Nest on Wonderland	London, Ontario, Canada	Apartment building under construction	2 dead, at least 4 injured
2020	Arecibo Telescope	Arecibo, Puerto Rico	Telescope	0 dead or injured
2021	Brindisi warehouse collapse	San Michele Salentino, Apulia, Italy	Warehouse	1 dead, 4 injured
2021	Cairo apartment collapse	Gesr El-Suez, Cairo, Egypt	Apartment building	25 dead, 25 injured
2021	2021 Bangkok residence collapse	Kritsadanakhon 31 Village, Bangkok, Thailand	Residence building	At least 4 dead, 5 injured
2021	Mexico City Metro overpass collapse	Tláhuac, Mexico City, Mexico	Overpass	26 dead, 79 injured
2021	Gwangju building collapse	Gwangju, South Korea	Collapsed onto a bus during demolition	9 dead, 8 injured
2021	Antwerp building collapse	Jos Smolderenstraat, Antwerp, Belgium	Primary school under construction	5 dead, 20 injured
2021	Rucheng residential building collapse	Rucheng County, Hunan, China	Residential building	5 dead, 7 injured
2021	Champlain Towers South	Surfside, Florida, United States	Condominium tower	98 dead, 11 injured
2021	Sangam Bridge	Arunachal Pradesh, India	Bridge	3 missing
2021	Collapse of Siji Kaiyuan Hotel	Suzhou, Jiangsu Province, China	Hotel annex	17 dead, 5 injured
2021	Kelowna crane collapse	Kelowna, British Columbia, Canada	Construction crane	5 dead
2021	Font Nova residential development apartment collapse	Peñíscola, Valencian Community, Spain	Residential building	2 dead
2021	AdventHealth Orlando parking garage crane collapse	Orlando, Florida, United States	Parking garage	1 injured
2021	Lagos high-rise	Ikoyi, Lagos, Nigeria	Apartments (under construction)	42 dead
2021	DLI4 Amazon warehouse	Edwardsville, Illinois, United States	Warehouse	6 dead, 4 injured
2022	Nemiga pedestrian bridge	Minsk, Belarus	Bridge	0 dead or injured
2022	Gwangju construction site collapse	Gwangju, South Korea	Wall (under construction)	3 injured, 0-3 missing
2022	Fern Hollow Bridge collapse	Pittsburgh, Pennsylvania, United States	Bridge	10 injured
2022	Alfamart Gambut collapse	Banjar Regency, South Kalimantan, Indonesia	Building	5 dead, 9 injured
2022	Changsha building collapse	Changsha, Hunan, China	Building	54 dead, 10 injured
2022	Abadan Metropol building collapse	Abadan, Iran	Building	41 dead
2022	Tretten Bridge collapse	Øyer Municipality, Norway	Bridge, with trusses and glued laminated timber	0 dead
2022	2022 Morbi bridge collapse	Morbi, Gujarat, India	Bridge	141 dead
2022	AquaDom collapse	Berlin, Germany	Aquarium	2 people injured
2022	Jakarta Islamic Centre dome collapse	Jakarta, Indonesia	Mosque	No deaths reported
2023	Charlotte scaffolding collapse	Charlotte, North Carolina, United States	Construction site	3 dead, 2 injured
2023	Belvidere Apollo Theatre collapse	Belvidere, Illinois, United States	Theatre building	1 dead, 28 injured
2023	2023 Marseille building collapse	Marseille, France	Building	8 dead, 5 injured, 200 displaced
2023	Collapse of crane on pier of Rutenberg Power Station	Ashkelon, Israel	Crane	2 dead, 1 injured
2023	2023 New York City parking garage collapse	New York City, United States	Parking garage	1 dead, 5 injured
2023	Interstate 95 bridge collapse	Philadelphia, Pennsylvania, United States	Highway overpass	1 dead
2023	Davenport apartment collapse	Davenport, Iowa, United States	Apartment building	3 dead, 1 injured
2023	Surry Hills Building collapse	Surry Hills, Sydney, Australia	Abandoned heritage building (nearby entrance to Central station damaged)	No deaths
2023	Santa Cruz church collapse	Ciudad Madero, Mexico	Church	11 dead, 60 injured
2024	Fronbergwarte	Schardenberg, Austria	Observation tower	No deaths reported
2024	First Church of Christ spire collapse	New London, Connecticut, United States	Church	No deaths reported
2024	Francis Scott Key Bridge collapse	Baltimore, Maryland, United States	Bridge	6 dead, 2 injured
2024	Apartment building collapse in George	George, Western Cape, South Africa	Apartment building under construction	34 dead
2024	Medusa Beach Club collapse	Palma, Spain	Bar with restaurant	4 dead
2024	San Pedro Garza García stage collapse	San Pedro Garza García, Nuevo León, Mexico	Stage	10 dead, 213 injured
2024	Saints Academy college collapse	Jos, Nigeria	Two story school	22 dead
2024	Graffiti Pier collapse	Philadelphia, Pennsylvania, United States	Abandoned coal pier	No deaths nor injuries
2024	Collapse of Tower 92 of powerline Anklam-Eggesin	Eggesin, Germany	Electricity pylon	0
2024	Kröv Hotel collapse	Kröv, Germany	Low-rise building	2
2024	Dresden Carola Bridge collapse	Dresden, Germany	Pillar bridge	0
2024	Dubrovnik Hotel collapse	Villa Gesell, Argentina	10-story apartment building	9 dead, 1 injured
2024	Novi Sad railway station canopy collapse	Novi Sad, Serbia	Canopy	16 dead, 1 injured
2025	2025 Kerdasa building collapse	Kerdasa, Egypt	Residential building	10 dead, 8 injured, several missing.
2025	Real Plaza Trujillo roof collapse	Trujillo, Peru	Shopping mall	8 dead, 84 injured.
2025	Telangana tunnel collapse	Telangana, India	Tunnel	2 dead, 6 injured
2025	Cabagan-Santa Maria Bridge Collapse	Isabela, Philippines	Bridge	6 Injured
2025	Valkenburg Wilheminatoren collapse	Valkenburg, The Netherlands	Tower	No deaths
2025	Collapse of Thailand State Audit Office building	Bangkok, Thailand	Skyscraper	96 dead, 9 injured
2025	Jet Set nightclub roof collapse	Santo Domingo, Dominican Republic	Nightclub	236 dead, 200+ injured.
2025	National Highway 66 collapse at Kooriyad, Malappuram	Kerala, India	National Highway 66	7 injured
2025	Portsmouth Portuguese American Citizens Club porch collapse	Portsmouth, Rhode Island, United States	Community center	1 dead, 6 injured
2025	Fotan Mansion collapse	Sindh, Pakistan	Residential building	27 dead, 9 injured
2025	Gambhira Bridge collapse	Gujarat, India	Bridge	22 dead, 9 injured
2025	Piplodi school building roof collapse	Piplodi, India	Building roof	7 dead, 20-28 injured
2025	Xiata Scenic Area Bridge	Zhaosu County, China	Bridge	5 dead, 24 injured
2025	Jianzha Yellow River Bridge	Qinghai, China	Bridge	12 dead, 4 missing
2025	Ramabai Apartment	Virar, India	Apartment building	17 dead, 9 injured
2025	Bogor Regency community hall	Bogor Regency, Indonesia	Community hall	4 dead, 84 injured
2025	Westchester One Parking Garage	White Plains, New York, United States	Parking Garage	0
2025	Al-Khoziny Islamic Boarding School collapse	Sidoarjo Regency, Indonesia	Four-story school	67 dead, 104 injured
2025	Arerti Maryam Church collapse	Amhara Region, Ethiopia	Church scaffolding	30+ dead, 200+ injured
2025	2025 Fez buildings collapse	Fez, Morocco	Residential building	22+ dead, 16+ injured
2026	Sikhio train disaster	Sikhio, Thailand	Launching gantry	30 dead, 69 injured
2026	CHOP Parking Garage collapse	Philadelphia, Pennsylvania, United States	Parking garage under construction	3 dead
2026	2026 Angeles City building collapse	Angeles City, Philippines	Mixed-use building under construction	30 dead, 8 injured
2026	Lahore tuition center roof collapse	Lahore, Pakistan	Tuition centre	14 children dead, 9 injured
2026	Satya Niketan PG Collapse	New Delhi, India	Paying guesthouse	7 dead
2026	2026 Peshawar school roof collapse	Peshawar, Pakistan	Private school	34 children and 1 teacher dead, 50+ injured
2026	New York City building collapse	New York City, United States	Three-story building	8 dead, 17 injured

== See also ==
- Structural integrity and failure
- List of aircraft structural failures
- List of bridge failures
- List of dam failures
- List of catastrophic collapses of broadcast masts and towers
