= Marseille building collapse =

Marseille building collapse may refer to:

- 2023 Marseille building collapse
- 2018 Marseille building collapse
