= Gentrification in New York City =

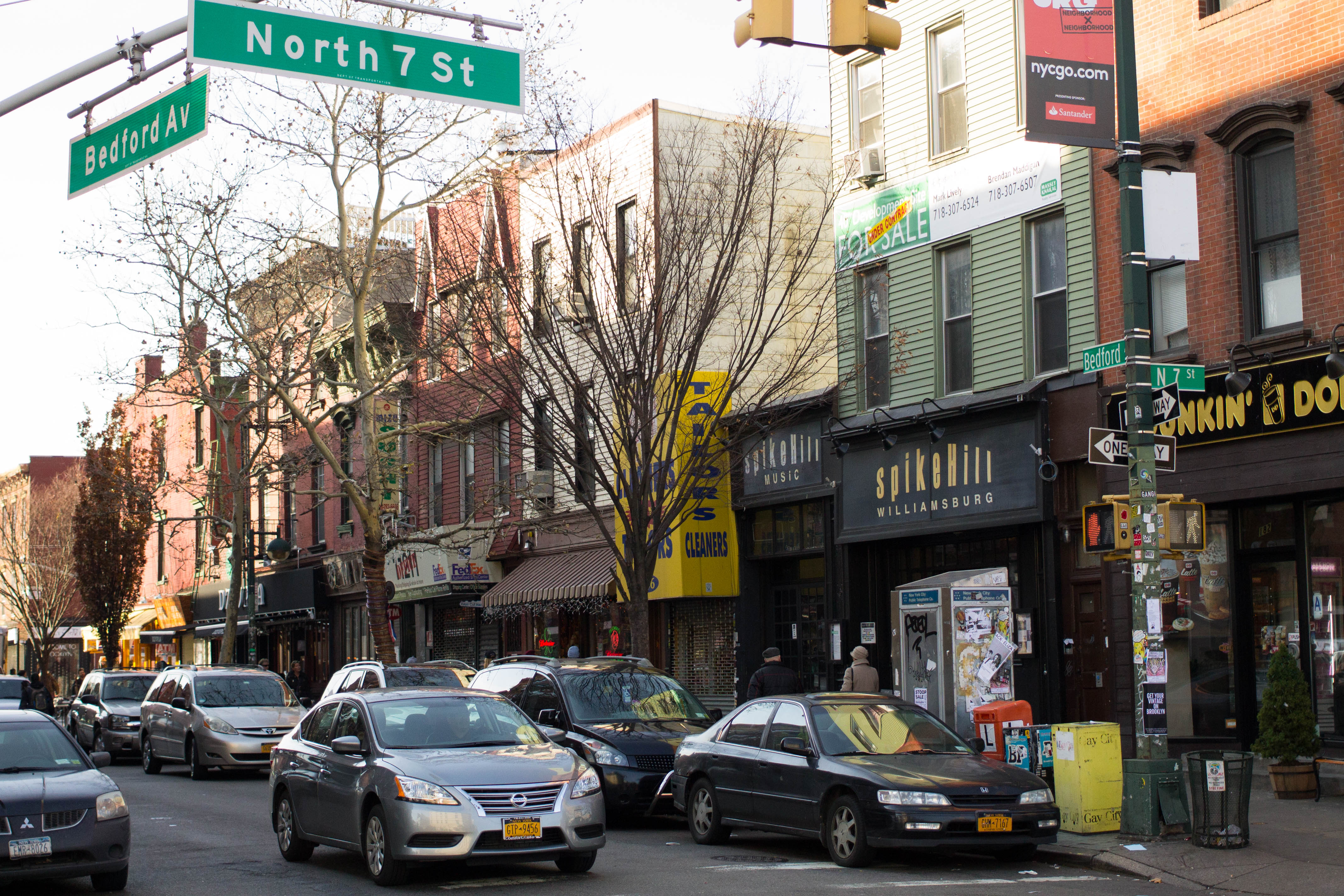
Williamsburg has been cited as a gentrified neighborhood in New York City.

Gentrification in New York City is the influx of more affluent residents and investments into lower-and middle class and/or under-developed neighborhoods, resulting in rising rents and low-income residents moving out. It is approximately the opposite of urban blight.

As a result of gentrification, some middle- and low-income residents of New York City, the largest city in the United States, have been alienated and forced to adjust to a complicated and changing urban environment, either directly or indirectly.

== History ==
In one of the first instances of the term “gentrification” being applied to a United States city, a 1979 article in the New York Times states "A renaissance in New York City? The rich moving in and the poor moving out? ... Hard as it is to believe, however, New York and other cities in the American Northeast are beginning to enjoy a revival as they undergo a gradual process known by the curious name of 'gentrification' term coined by the displaced English poor and subsequently adopted by urban experts to describe the movements of social classes in and around London."

=== Real Estate Boom and Urban Renewal ===
Following the fiscal crisis of the 1970s, New York City entered a period of gradual economic recovery in the 1980s. City-led urban renewal efforts, including the sale of city-owned properties, rezonings, and public-private partnerships, contributed to the transformation of many neighborhoods. In particular, areas like SoHo, the East Village, and parts of Brooklyn began to see an influx of artists, young professionals, and later, real estate developers. This influx contributed to the conversion of industrial buildings into lofts, the rise in property values, and the eventual displacement of long-term, often lower-income, residents.

In 1986, the creation of the New York City Department of Housing Preservation and Development’s (HPD) 10-Year Plan aimed to rebuild neighborhoods by investing in affordable housing construction and rehabilitation. While the plan restored many deteriorating blocks, it also laid the groundwork for increased property speculation and demographic shifts in historically working-class communities.

Tensions grew between preservationists, developers, long-term residents, and newcomers, as debates over who the city was being “renewed” for became central to urban politics.

=== Rezoning and Displacement ===
During the mayoral administrations of Michael Bloomberg (2002–2013), New York City underwent extensive rezoning, with over 100 neighborhoods affected. These rezonings were intended to stimulate economic growth, encourage development, and increase housing stock—particularly through upzoning in areas targeted for high-density residential and commercial use.

While some areas saw an increase in affordable housing units through programs such as Inclusionary Zoning, critics argue that these policies primarily incentivized market-rate development and led to the displacement of working-class and minority residents. Notable rezoned neighborhoods include Williamsburg, Brooklyn, Harlem, and Long Island City, which experienced significant demographic shifts, rent increases, and cultural change during this period.

From 2000 to 2020, New York City gained 623,637 residents. This is three times greater than the previous decade. During the pandemic, this population decreased and brought that number down to 468,293 residents. The market between 2020 and 2024 the rent has rapidly increased to be about 17% higher than it was pre pandemic.

Public housing developments and rent-stabilized buildings faced increasing pressure as private developers and investors expanded their reach. Advocates and community organizers responded by forming coalitions to resist displacement, push for stronger tenant protections, and demand more deeply affordable housing.

== Causes ==
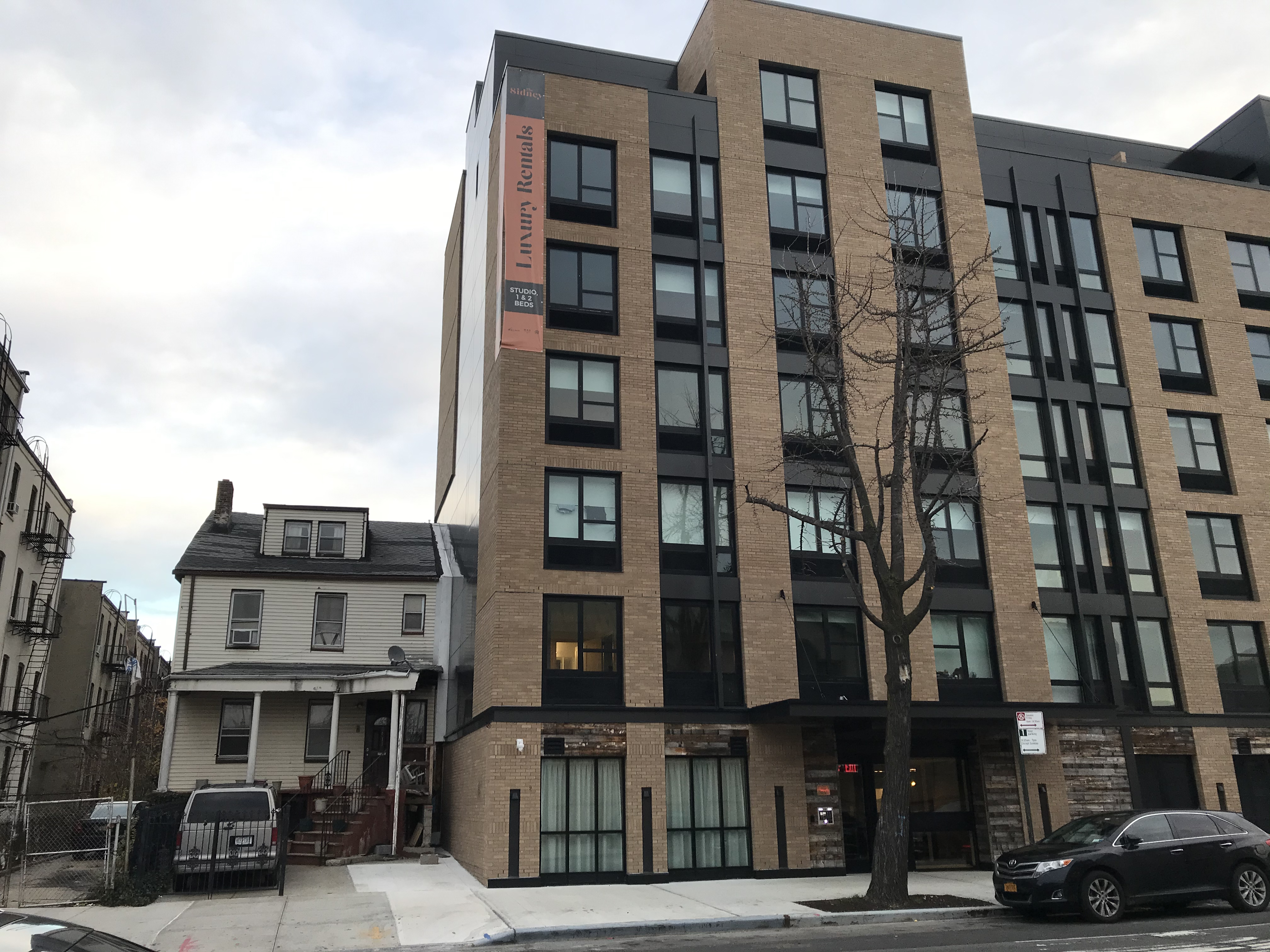
A 3 story house stands next to a newly built 7 story apartment building on Church Ave in Flatbush, Brooklyn

Gentrification increases property values and changes the social and physical makeup of neighborhoods that were previously thought to be unappealing to newcomers.

Private real estate investment and zoning regulations guide the creation of housing across the city. New development may be disproportionately concentrated in densely zoned low-income communities of color, while areas covered by lower density zoning are disproportionately white and middle- and upper-income residents who can marshall greater political capital to fight upzoning and new housing development.

=== Political policies ===
A wave of displacement of people in New York City started in the 1970s and 1980s with a significant increase in middle-income housing in the form of rehabilitated single-family dwellings, mostly in historic districts, driven by affluent, educated young professionals with "an increasing desire for the kinds of cultural and intellectual pursuits that are generally found only in the central cities—performing arts, museums, libraries, seminars, and etc." Normal succession appears to be accountable for changes in gentrifying districts in New York City, at least during the 1990s.

=== Housing regulation ===
In the wave of new policies in the 1990s the state stopped promoting public housing and allowed private institutions to lead the housing production.

=== Upzoning ===
Neighborhoods in New York City have been upzoned since the early 2000s in order to enable the creation of more housing. The results of such policies are complex and contentious. Housing economists generally agree that strict zoning, by constraining the extent to which housing supply can respond to increases in demand, has a broadly negative effect on housing affordability. However, the details of how upzonings are executed, including their scope and whether they mandate new buildings to include subsidized units, and the extent to which existing housing is demolished can lead to varied outcomes. Some research points to up-zoned neighborhoods that have become whiter and wealthier as space is made for new residents of those characteristics to move in. However, neighborhoods may also experience this effect due to more privileged residents being able to outbid existing residents for a constrained housing supply, resulting in greater displacement driven by a lack of sufficient zoning flexibility. Additionally, construction of new housing can absorb residents who would otherwise live elsewhere, relieving demand pressure across a metro area and slowing gentrification on a broader scale.

== Effects ==
Gentrification is viewed by some as a source of contention between renters and working people who live in New York City and real estate interests. Additionally, some view a subset of this opposition to be an antagonism between longtime working-class residents of the city and the influx of new residents.

The process of low-income displacement in New York City is often associated with increases in rent; rent rises to the point that tenants can no longer afford to live in their apartments. Residents are forced to leave their homes in search of a more inexpensive location, yet this is a problem that affects many locations. Many persons who have been displaced face a serious dilemma, as displacement can lead to homelessness. The constantly trends with increasing household income, which is compatible with gentrification hypotheses. When income growth is broken down by race, Blacks and Latinos either have no effect on gentrification or slow it down by 2010. These findings back up widespread claims that as gentrification spreads across the city, even middle-class Blacks and Latinos are finding it increasingly difficult to stay in gentrifying areas. For example, Long Island City and Downtown Brooklyn are now whiter, affluent, and more crowded. "The predicted increase in commercial development never happened," according to the report. Instead, a barrage of high-end, high-rise residential building has altered these areas." At the same time, the public schools in the area are overcrowded.

Another large consequence of gentrification in New York City has been the increase of peripheral and metropolitan development of illegal housing, often at risk zones such as seismic areas, flood zones and dangerous slopes. In 2003, Michael Bloomberg had chosen the "right people" from the business, governmental, and nonprofit sectors. He has created clear criteria and measurement tools to enable performance review. Bloomberg and his former private sector colleagues were leveraging their corporate management skills and extensive knowledge of the private sector to build the organizational capacity required to achieve achievements. Agencies were reformed, key missions redefined, and strategic plans

=== Positive Impact of Gentrification ===
Gentrifying neighborhoods in New York City witness an increase in commercial activity.

=== Negative Impact of Gentrification ===
Gentrification can have negative effects on the mental health of adults and children alike. Children of low-income families that live in gentrified neighborhoods are seen to have "higher prevalence of anxiety or depression" compared to children living in other neighborhoods. Researchers also found that economically vulnerable and higher-income adults living in gentrified neighborhoods had higher levels of depression and anxiety than adults living in other neighborhoods with more geographical segregation.

== By Borough ==
=== Brooklyn ===
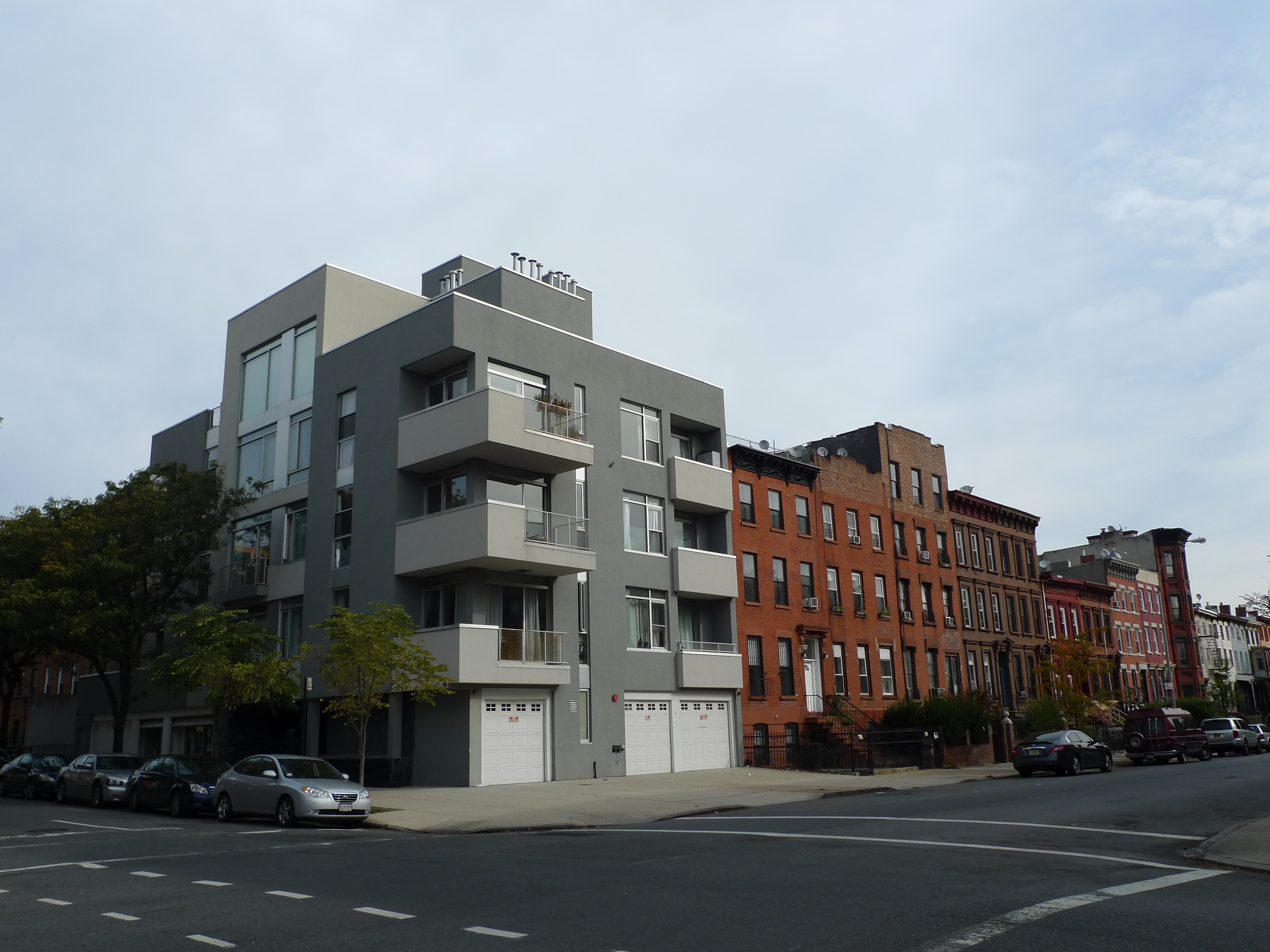
Condos in Bedford Stuyvesant next to 4 story brick buildings, 2012

Brooklyn experiences or has experienced extensive gentrification for over 20+ years. The gentrification of Brooklyn includes, but is not limited to, the neighborhoods of Williamsburg, Bushwick, Sunset Park, Park Slope, Crown Heights, Bedford–Stuyvesant, Fort Greene, and Flatbush.

In November 2026, the fatal collapse of a three-story mixed building at 1321 Flatbush Avenue into an adjacent evacuation site sparked renewed community debate over the pace of real estate development and gentrification in Flatbush. Local residents and community board leaders raised concerns that rapid construction and rezoning in the Afro-Caribbean enclave were outpacing safety oversight and displacing longtime residents.

=== The Bronx ===
The Bronx experiences or has experienced gentrification in many neighborhoods including the Kingsbridge Heights neighborhood.

=== Manhattan ===
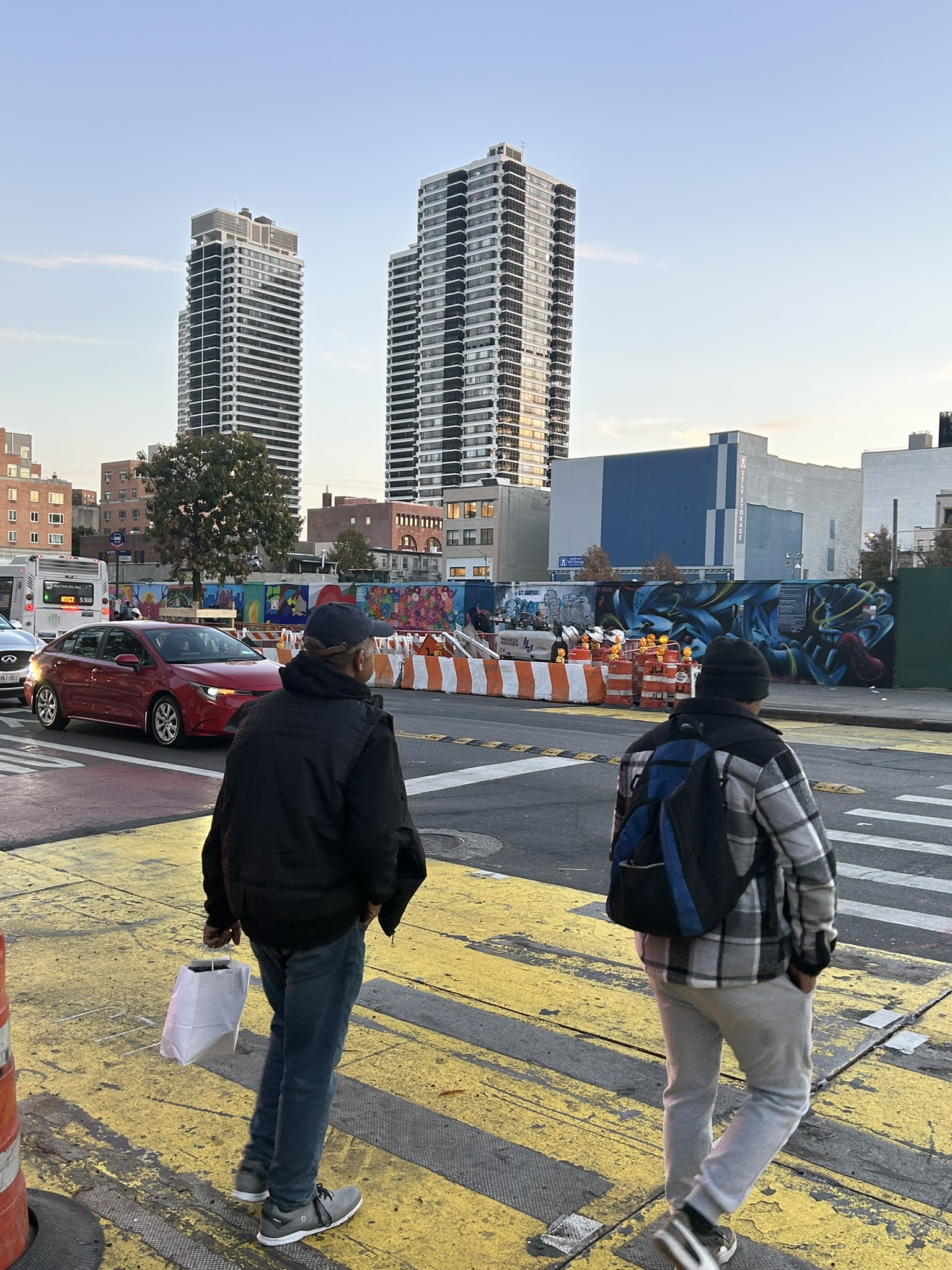
New skyscraper for affordable housing in East Harlem, NYC, 2024

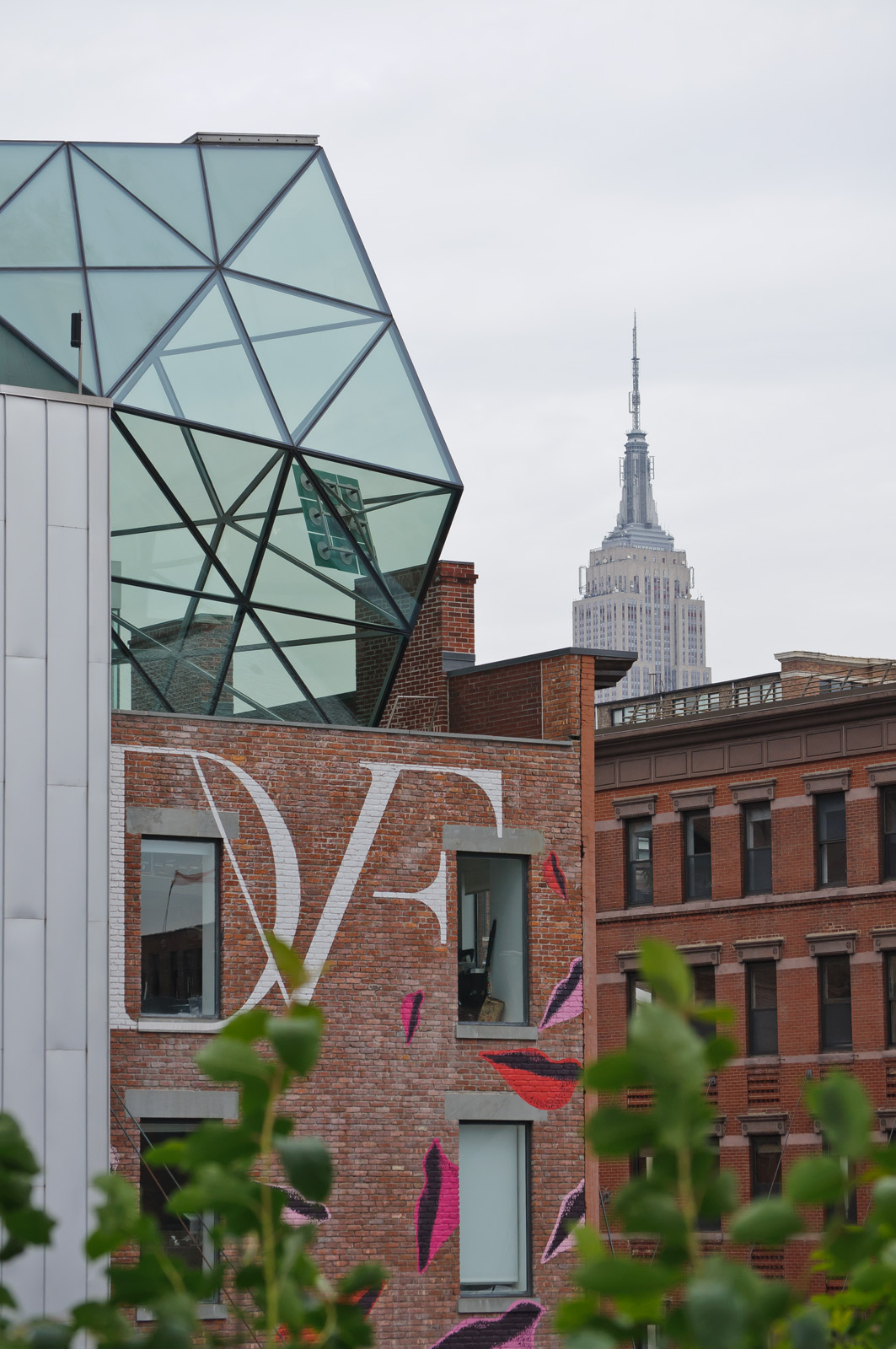
View from the High Line Park, 2012

Manhattan experiences or has experienced gentrification in many neighborhoods including Chinatown, Harlem, Meatpacking District,Lower East Side, Chelsea, Hell's Kitchen, and Times Square.

=== Queens ===
As of 2023, Queens experiences gentrification in the Ridgewood neighborhood. Additionally, experts predict new or continued gentrification in Queens impacting Long Island City, Astoria, Jackson Heights, the Rockaways, and Jamaica.

=== Staten Island ===
On Staten Island there has been focused development in the northeastern corner of Staten Island, including the waterside neighborhoods of Stapleton, St. George, Tompkinsville, and Clifton.

== See also ==
- Gentrification
- New York City
- History of New York City
- New York Metropolitan Area
- Sustainable Cities
