= Sporthalle =

Sporthalle may refer to:

- Sporthalle Augsburg, an indoor arena in Augsburg, Germany
- Sporthalle Gießen-Ost, an indoor arena in Gießen, Germany
- Sporthalle (Böblingen) (1966-2008), a former indoor arena in Böblingen, Germany
- Sporthalle (Cologne) (1958-1998), a former indoor arena in Cologne, Germany

== See also ==
- Alsterdorfer Sporthalle (Sporthalle Hamburg), an indoor arena in Hamburg, Germany
- Knick-Ei (Sporthalle Feldstraße), a former sports hall in Halstenbek, Germany
- TipsArena Linz (Linzer Sporthalle), an indoor arena in Linz, Austria
- RWE-Sporthalle, a sports hall in Mülheim, Germany
