= 2026 Satya Niketan building collapse =

Incident in Delhi

- Date: 6 September 2026
- Time: 01:34 p.m. IST (UTC+5:30)
- Location: Satya Niketan, South-West Delhi, New Delhi, India; 28°35′16.23″N 77°10′6.57″E
- Type: Building collapse
- Cause: Suspected structural weakness due to basement renovation
- Deaths: 7
- Injuries: 6
- Arrests: Hari Ram Gupta, Urmila Gupta, Mahesh Gupta
- Accused: Hariram Gupta

On 6 September 2026, a five-storey residential building operating as a boys' paying guest (PG) accommodation collapsed in the Satya Niketan neighbourhood of South-West Delhi, India. The collapse resulted in at least 7 fatalities and 6 critical injuries. Several students were reported trapped under the rubble, prompting a multi-agency rescue operation

The incident highlighted broader systemic negligence within Delhi University’s residential infrastructure, specifically the shortage of official university hostel accommodations and the unregulated expansion of private paying guest (PG) networks. Critics and student collectives argue that this supply deficit enables a local landlord syndicate to artificially inflate rental prices in surrounding residential hubs.

== Background ==
Satya Niketan is a densely populated neighborhood located near the Delhi University South Campus. Its proximity to educational institutions makes it a center for student housing, containing numerous paying guest (PG) accommodations and eateries.

The collapsed structure was a 40- to 50-year-old, five-storey residential building (including a basement) known as "Hostel Daze." Owned by Gurugram based family of Hari Ram Gupta, it operated as a boys' hostel containing 15 rooms, with 2 to 3 students occupying each room. A medical shop was located on the ground floor. Prior to the collapse, the Delhi-NCR region received heavy rainfall. Unauthorized structural renovations were reportedly occurring in the building's basement.

== Incident ==
The collapse occurred on the afternoon of Sunday, 6 September 2026. Due to the weekend and concurrent rainfall, students were inside the building. At approximately 1:30 pm, the structure collapsed. Eyewitnesses reported a loud rumbling sound followed by a large cloud of dust and smoke.

The Delhi Police South Campus police station received a PCR call regarding the collapse near the Nanakpura Gurdwara at 1:34 pm. The Delhi Fire Services received an emergency alert at a similar time. Preliminary reports indicated that the structure's bottom pillars were weakened by ongoing ground-floor renovations intended to create additional rental space.

== Casualties and rescue operations ==
The collapse resulted in at least 6 fatalities, with rescue operations initially confirming 3 deaths at the site. Nine individuals were rescued from the debris and transferred to the AIIMS trauma centre in critical condition. Eyewitness and police estimates indicated that between 25 and 50 people were inside the building at the time of the collapse.

Responding agencies included the National Disaster Response Force (NDRF), Delhi Disaster Management Authority (DDMA), Delhi Fire Services, Delhi Police, Municipal Corporation of Delhi (MCD), Centralised Accident and Trauma Services (CATS), and Civil Defence.

The fire department deployed 8 fire tenders to the scene, and earth excavators (JCBs) were utilised to clear debris. Local residents and bystanders initially assisted in removing rubble by hand. Rescue workers reported hearing voices from beneath the debris, and some trapped individuals made phone calls to the outside. The adjacent building was evacuated as a precautionary measure.

== Investigation ==
Following the collapse, student collectives stated that a deficit of official Delhi University hostel accommodations has led to the unregulated expansion of private PG networks. These groups asserted that this supply deficit allows local landlords to inflate rental prices in surrounding residential areas.

Initial findings identified structural deficiencies and regulatory violations as contributing factors to the collapse. Prior to the incident, unauthorized construction and modification work was occurring in the basement. Structural experts noted that basement alterations in a building of this age compromised its foundational stability.

Constructed during the 1990s, the building was operating beyond its intended load capacity. Investigators examined the addition of a fifth floor, which exceeded sanctioned municipal construction limits. Residents and survivors stated that the building lacked fire safety clearances, structural inspections, and a secondary emergency exit.

== Legal action and inquires ==
The Delhi Police registered a first information report (FIR) and arrested the property owner, Hariram Gupta, on charges of criminal negligence and building code violations. Delhi Chief Minister Rekha Gupta ordered a magisterial inquiry to determine administrative and structural lapses.

A Public Interest Litigation (PIL) was filed in the Delhi High Court seeking an independent investigation into the incident. During proceedings, the High Court noted that Delhi University and the Municipal Corporation of Delhi shared regulatory responsibility regarding the operation of unapproved commercial student housing.

== Administrative response ==
The MCD Commissioner suspended five municipal officials, including a South Zone Deputy Commissioner and four structural engineers, citing negligence in oversight. The MCD issued a city-wide order to seal unauthorized structures exceeding four storeys. Additionally, three-day self-demolition notices were issued to owners of adjacent properties and structures in Satya Niketan determined to be in dangerous condition.

== Protests ==
Student organizations, including the Akhil Bharatiya Vidyarthi Parishad (ABVP), held demonstrations outside the MCD headquarters, demanding mandatory structural safety audits for all private student accommodations. Commentators and student groups drew comparisons between the collapse and a July 2024 incident in Delhi where three civil service aspirants died in a flooded basement.

== See also ==
- Lalita Park building collapse
