= Caprigliola bridge collapse =

260 m road bridge collapsed in Italy on 8 April 2020

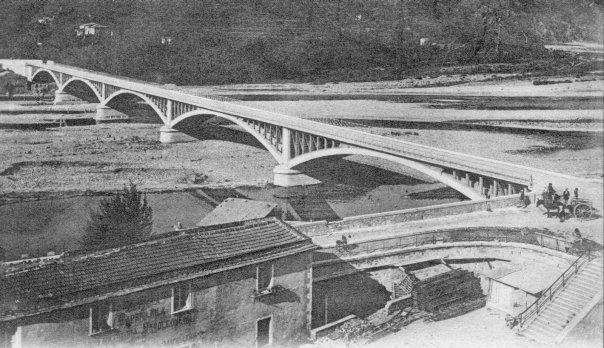
- 1914 postcard of the bridge
- Coordinates: 44°10′26.4″N 09°55′31.7″E
- Owner: ANAS
- Heritage status: First reinforced concrete bridge constructed in Italy. The longest reinforced concrete bridge in the world (from its construction for about a decade).

Characteristics
- Material: Reinforced concrete
- Total length: 260 m (850 ft)
- Width: 7.2 m (24 ft)
- Height: 10 m (33 ft)
- No. of spans: 5
- Piers in water: 4

History
- Architect: Prof. Attilio Muggia
- Designer: Prof. Attilio Muggia and Ing. Nino Ferrari
- Constructed by: Ing. Nino Ferrari Impresa Costruzioni Generali Srl
- Construction start: 1906
- Construction end: 1908
- Opened: October 1908
- Inaugurated: 11 October 1908
- Rebuilt: 1945–1949 after being mined by the German Wehrmacht in 1945
- Collapsed: 8 April 2020

The bridge of Caprigliola was also known as the Albiano bridge, the Albiano Magra bridge or the Ponte di Albiano Magra.

On 8 April 2020 at 10:25 am local time (8:25 UTC), the 260-metre (850 ft) long road bridge on Italian state highway SS330 near the town of Aulla between the villages of Caprigliola and Albiano Magra near La Spezia collapsed into the Magra river. The traffic on the bridge was unusually light due to the coronavirus quarantine then in force, and the collapse caused only minor injuries to two truck drivers.

There were reports that a gas pipeline had been damaged by the collapse; the pipeline was quickly isolated by Italgas.

== History ==
The 111-year-old bridge was located on the river Magra at about 9 km (6 mi) south from the town of Aulla, a comune in the province of Massa and Carrara, Tuscany in central Italy. In late 2019, a crack on the road pavement was reported by bridge users after heavy rainfall. ANAS S.p.A. (Azienda Nazionale Autonoma delle Strade, English: National Autonomous Roads Corporation), was in charge of the maintenance of the bridge. After reports by drivers, ANAS carried out an inspection of the bridge, finding no anomalies or defects requiring emergency repairs. A crack in the road pavement was then repaired with fresh asphalt. As of 9 April 2020, the root cause of the bridge collapse was unknown but a small event may have triggered a more significant one, compromising the structural stability of the bridge.

=== Construction ===
Attilio Muggia (1861 – 1936), a Venetian engineer and pioneer of reinforced concrete in Italy, designed and built the bridge on the Magra river to connect Albiano with Caprigliola and Liguria with Tuscany. From 1896, Muggia had direct and very close relations with François Hennebique, the father of reinforced concrete in France and Belgium, to be able to use Hennebique's patents (registered in 1892) for his works in Bologna.

Muggia designed the reinforced concrete bridge in 1901. The company in charge of the construction of the bridge was led by engineer Nino Ferrari and Professor Attilio Muggia. Nino Ferrari (1875 –1941) was an assistant of Professor Muggia at the civil engineering school of the University of Bologna, a city from which Ferrari himself came. The name of the company was "Ing. Nino Ferrari Impresa Costruzioni Generali Srl".

The construction works began in May 1906 but were soon interrupted by the unpredictable geological nature of the river bed found to be weaker than anticipated. Then, in order to dig and to consolidate the pillars foundations in the river sediments, Muggia and Ferrari also successfully applied an innovative excavation technique at that time with air pressurized chambers (Triger foundation process), which had also been used for digging the foundations of the Eiffel Tower. About 300 workers were involved in the construction works.

The construction was completed in October 1908 and the bridge was inaugurated on 11 October 1908 after a demanding mechanical load test. It was the second reinforced concrete bridge built by Muggia in Italy, then a cutting-edge technique. Indeed, in 1900 Attilio Muggia had already constructed the first bridge on the basis of reinforced concrete with 8 arches at the river Po in Piacenza.

The bridge had five slender arches of 51.85 metres (170.1 ft) span, each supported by four stacks and two shoulders. The deck was supported by 400 pillars resting on the arches. The construction required 3,000 tonnes of cement and 220 tonnes of iron. After the bridge opened the ferry service that had operated for centuries ceased.

=== Damage in World War II ===
The bridge was badly damaged in spring 1945 at the end of World War II (80 years ago) by mines set by retreating troops of the German Wehrmacht. It was repaired between 1945 and 1949 by the company of the engineer Nino Ferrari who had died in 1941. The upper parts of the bridge and its deck were reconstructed, retaining the original lower parts of the bridge. During the reconstruction, the original characteristics of the project of Muggia and Ferrari were preserved but the bridge was adapted for greater mechanical loads required by heavier traffic. The new bridge was designed by Arrigo Carè and Giorgio Giannelli.

== Bridge inspection and maintenance ==
The bridge was managed by the Province of Massa Carrara between 2000 and 2018. In December 2018, responsibility was transferred to the infrastructure company Azienda Nazionale Autonoma delle Strade SpA (ANAS) along with other 1,300 bridges across Italy, and 3,500 kilometres (2,200 mi) of roads.

The first warnings about the stability of the bridge had already been given in 2013. In 2019, motorists reported to authorities growing cracks in the asphalt surface of the road by severe weather. The technicians of ANAS insured after an inspection of the bridge in November 2019 that there were no structural problems, but only aesthetic impairments.

== Concerns about safety ==
The Municipality of Aulla and local inhabitants had previously questioned the safety of the bridge. In an August 2019 letter, Vincenzo Marzi, then head of the ANAS department for Tuscany, replied that "The viaduct for the moment does not present criticalities such as to compromise its static functionality". This was before the discovery of a crack in the asphalt of the road in November 2019.

== Root causes of the collapse ==
Although the root causes of the collapse of the bridge have not yet been identified, some experts have made conjectures. According to inGENIO, an Italian technical magazine for architects, construction engineers and geotechnicians, an unknown localized damage seems to have propagated and caused a chain collapse (domino effect). This tragic event illustrates the weaknesses sometimes encountered in early 20th century engineering structures which were not originally designed to comply with the present requirement of defence-in-depth in order to prevent the devastating consequences of an uncontrolled destructive propagation.

Voce Apuana reported comments by Fabrizio Ferrari, an engineer who is a grandson of Nino Ferrari who constructed the bridge with Professor Muggia between 1906 and 1908:

"His impression is that there has been a break due to a cut of a section of the deck at a support. The piles, however, still seem in place. A bridge pier has rotated and tipped over, perhaps dragged by the deck that passed over it, but the massive base of the pile, the one in the riverbed is intact. The piles are very deep, I doubt that the explanations for this collapse lie in the fact that you are in the river bed. Whether it is a failure of the deck."

== See also ==
- Ponte Morandi—A road viaduct in Genoa that collapsed in August 2018
- List of bridge failures
- List of structural failures and collapses
- Structural integrity and failure
