= Piplodi school roof collapse =

Building disaster in Rajasthan, India

- Date: 25 July 2025
- Time: 8.00 am IST (UTC+05:30)
- Location: Piplodi, Rajasthan, India; 24.2551014°N 76.7327599°E
- Cause: Structural failure
- Deaths: 7
- Injuries: 27

On 25 July 2025, part of a classroom roof collapsed in the Piplodi Government School in the Indian state of Rajasthan, killing seven students and injuring 27 others.

== Incident ==
The collapse occurred around 8 a.m. IST (UTC+05:30), shortly before the morning assembly began. Students reportedly noticed falling debris and alerted the teachers, who dismissed the warnings and instructed them to remain seated. Moments later, the classroom wall and roof gave away, burying 35 children under the debris. The incident resulted in the deaths of seven students with ages ranging from 7 to 13 years, and injuring 27 others.

The injured were taken to the Manoharthana primary health centre, with the critically injured patients later transferred to Jhalawar district hospital.

== Aftermath ==
A five-member committee led by the local zila parishad was tasked with investigating the causes of the collapse. Criminal complaints were filed against the school headmaster and five teachers, who were later suspended.

Bhajan Lal Sharma, the Chief Minister of Rajasthan, mourned the tragedy, and ordered a safety inspection of all school buildings in the state and sealing of unsafe buildings. The Government of Rajasthan announced a compensation of ₹1 million (US$10,000) and a government job to one member from each of the families of the killed. The union education ministry directed all states and territories to conduct safety audits of school buildings for structural integrity and fire safety, conduct emergency drills, and ensure mental health preparedness.

The school was to resume functioning at a nearby government school on 28 July, while a new school building featuring classrooms named in memory of the children is to be constructed. The government proposed that ₹1.5 billion (US$16 million) would be spent on repairing classrooms in schools throughout the state, and school buildings deemed unrepairable would be razed and replaced with temporary containers, while the rest would be cataloged and monitored. On 6 September 2025, Mor Singh, a 60-year-old farm labourer, donated his two-room house for temporary use for the school and proposed to move his family into a temporary shelter on his farmland. In recognition, the Rajasthan government announced a ₹0.2 million (US$2,100) aid for Singh.

== Reactions ==
Droupadi Murmu, the President of India, offered her condolences and prayers to the families of the deceased. Narendra Modi, the Prime Minister of India, expressed his grief on the incident. Rahul Gandhi, the Leader of the Opposition in the Lok Sabha, demanded a fair investigation, and punishment for those responsible for the incident. Other leaders, including former chief minister of Rajasthan Ashok Gehlot and Lok Sabha speaker Om Birla also expressed grief.

The opposition criticised state education minister Madan Dilawar for the poor state of school infrastructure, with calls for his resignation due to dereliction of duty and after he appeared at a welcome celebration in Jagheena the day after the incident.

On 29 July, Rashtriya Loktantrik Partyleader Hanuman Beniwal, Bharat Adivasi Party leader Rajkumar Roat, and Azad Samaj Party leader Chandrashekhar Azad protested outside the Parliament of India, demanding accountability and compensation for the collapse. Later, Beniwal asserted that all government officials and political leaders should enroll their children in government schools, arguing that this would lead to an improvement in the quality of public education. In September 2025, Naresh Meena attempted to march to the chief minister's residence and launched a hunger strike in Jaipur demanding compensation for victims.
