= Arerti Maryam Church collapse =

2025 building collapse in Ethiopia

- Date: 1 October 2025; 8 months ago
- Time: 7:45 a.m. EAT (UTC+03:00)
- Venue: Arerti Maryam Church
- Location: Arerti District, Minjar Shenkora, North Shewa Zone, Amhara Region, Ethiopia; 8.930°N 39.426°E
- Type: Building collapse
- Participants: 236+
- Outcome: Damage to the church
- Deaths: 36+
- Injuries: 200+
- Missing: Some
- Property damage: Scaffolding collapsed

On 1 October 2025, the scaffolding of Arerti Mariyam Ethiopian Orthodox Church in Arerti District, Amhara Region, Ethiopia collapsed during its construction, killing at least 36 people and injuring over 200 others.

== Incident ==
At 7:45 a.m. the scaffolding of the church collapsed. The accident happened during a pilgrimage to mark the Virgin Mary's anniversary. 1 October in the Orthodox Church is Intercession of the Theotokos, a Marian feast.

Eyewitnesses told the BBC that people were climbing up the scaffolding inside the church to admire a newly completed mural on the ceiling.

Ahmed Gebeyehu, Minjar District Police Commander told the death toll was increasing as many victims were transported to hospital.

Speaking before the Ethiopian Broadcasting Corporation, local official Atnafu Abate stated some victims remained under rubble.
