= 2026 New York City building collapse =

Building collapse in Brooklyn, New York

- Photo of dumpsters filled with debris from the collapse, and exposed interior of 1323 Flatbush Avenue
- Date: November 11, 2026
- Time: Approximately 16:00 (EST; UTC−05:00)
- Location: 1321 Flatbush Avenue, Brooklyn, New York City, United States; 40°38′20″N 73°57′14″W
- Type: Building collapse
- Cause: Under investigation
- Deaths: 8
- Injuries: 18 (1 critical)

On November 11, 2026, a three-story mixed-use building at 1321 Flatbush Avenue in Flatbush, a neighborhood in Brooklyn, New York, collapsed into an adjacent excavation site, killing eight people and injuring eighteen others. Rescue operations concluded the following afternoon, and the cause remained under investigation.

== Background ==
According to New York City Department of Buildings (DOB) records, the building contained five units, four of them residential. A store occupied the ground floor. The row of four buildings on the block, including 1321 Flatbush Avenue, dates to 1930.

The adjacent construction site, at 2625 Bedford Avenue, had approval for a three-story building. Plans for a nine-story mixed-use building had not been approved.

== Collapse ==
Security camera photograph of the collapse from inside adjoining building 1323 Flatbush Avenue

The building collapsed into the adjacent excavation site, trapping people from both the building and the construction site. The New York City Fire Department (FDNY) received the first 911 call reporting the collapse at 16:01 EST on November 11.

The collapse tore off an adjoining wall, exposing stairwells, and second- and third-floor rooms, of 1323 Flatbush Avenue. A section of the ground floor and back wall of 1321, including at least one window frame, remained standing.

=== Rescue and evacuations ===
Firefighters and police searched the wreckage for nearly 24 hours. On the afternoon of November 12, the FDNY announced that rescue operations had concluded and that no further victims remained at the site. The site was then turned over to the DOB and the New York City Police Department (NYPD).

== Casualties ==
Fatalities:
  - Barry Mamadou, 23, resident of the building that collapsed
  - Ndiaye Mamadou, 31, Barry’s cousin, resident of the building that collapsed
  - José Luis Caguana Cosquillo, 26
  - Kevin Santiago Reyes Gonzalez, 10, resident of the building that collapsed
  - Nicole Daniela Salvala Rodriguez, 9, Kevin’s cousin, resident of the building that collapsed
  - Juan Daniel Salvada Guzman, 31, resident of the building that collapsed
  - Edgar Sapon, 26
  - Gabriel Siguencia, 22

Eight people died: six adults, including two construction workers, a DoorDash deliveryman and an Amazon worker from Guinea in West Africa, and two elementary-school-age cousins. Six people were pronounced dead at the scene, and two died at a hospital. Eighteen others were injured, including four firefighters. At a November 12 briefing, Mayor Zohran Mamdani said one injured person remained in critical condition. Several of the victims were undocumented immigrants.

== Aftermath ==
The American Red Cross states that in the immediate aftermath, seven households, consisting of fourteen adults and five children, received emergency aid and were relocated. The Flatbush YMCA, at 1401 Flatbush Avenue, served as a reception point for those affected, and many community organizations, including Bethesda Church of God at 1280 Flatbush Avenue, continued to provide aid in the days after.

Vacate orders have been issued for 1323, 1325, and 1327 Flatbush Avenue. The adjacent building, 1323 Flatbush Avenue, whose interior was exposed, is currently slated for demolition.

== Investigation ==
=== Previous violations ===
On March 20, 2026, the DOB ordered the stoppage of demolition at the neighboring construction site after inspectors found inadequate overhead protection for adjacent properties. When inspectors returned on April 23, they found that demolition had resumed despite the stop-work order and issued another violation. The DOB lifted the order on May 8 after the conditions were corrected. CBS News reported based on court records that the contractor targeted by the stop-work order had been sued "at least 67 times since 2012".

NY1 reported that the New York City Department of Housing Preservation and Development had recorded 98 violations against 1321 Flatbush Avenue dating back to 1972. Curbed reported that these violations included "unsafe electrical wiring, vermin, and defective smoke detectors", and that the landlord had been jailed in 2006 for 650 violations over three buildings he owned.

=== Response to the collapse ===
The neighboring construction site had active permits for excavation and foundation work. Following the collapse, the DOB issued a full stop-work order. A DOB notice attributed the collapse to "unsafe construction operations", while officials said the cause remained under investigation.

Mamdani said five entities associated with the construction site were also associated with approximately 100 other sites across the city. On November 12, he announced that the DOB was beginning inspections of those sites.

=== Engineering analysis ===
Civil engineering experts interviewed by Scientific American suggested that failure of a soil-retention shoring system at the neighboring excavation could have contributed to the collapse. They identified possible factors including the shoring design, vibration from construction machinery, and the condition of the existing building. These explanations were preliminary; the DOB had not announced a final cause.

== Reactions ==
Some neighborhood residents found the collapse and disaster response subtly reminiscent of the September 11 attacks. Mayor Zohran Mamdani announced those responsible would be held accountable.

== See also ==
- List of building and structure collapses
