= 2023 Marseille building collapse =

2023 building collapse in France

Marseille building collapse
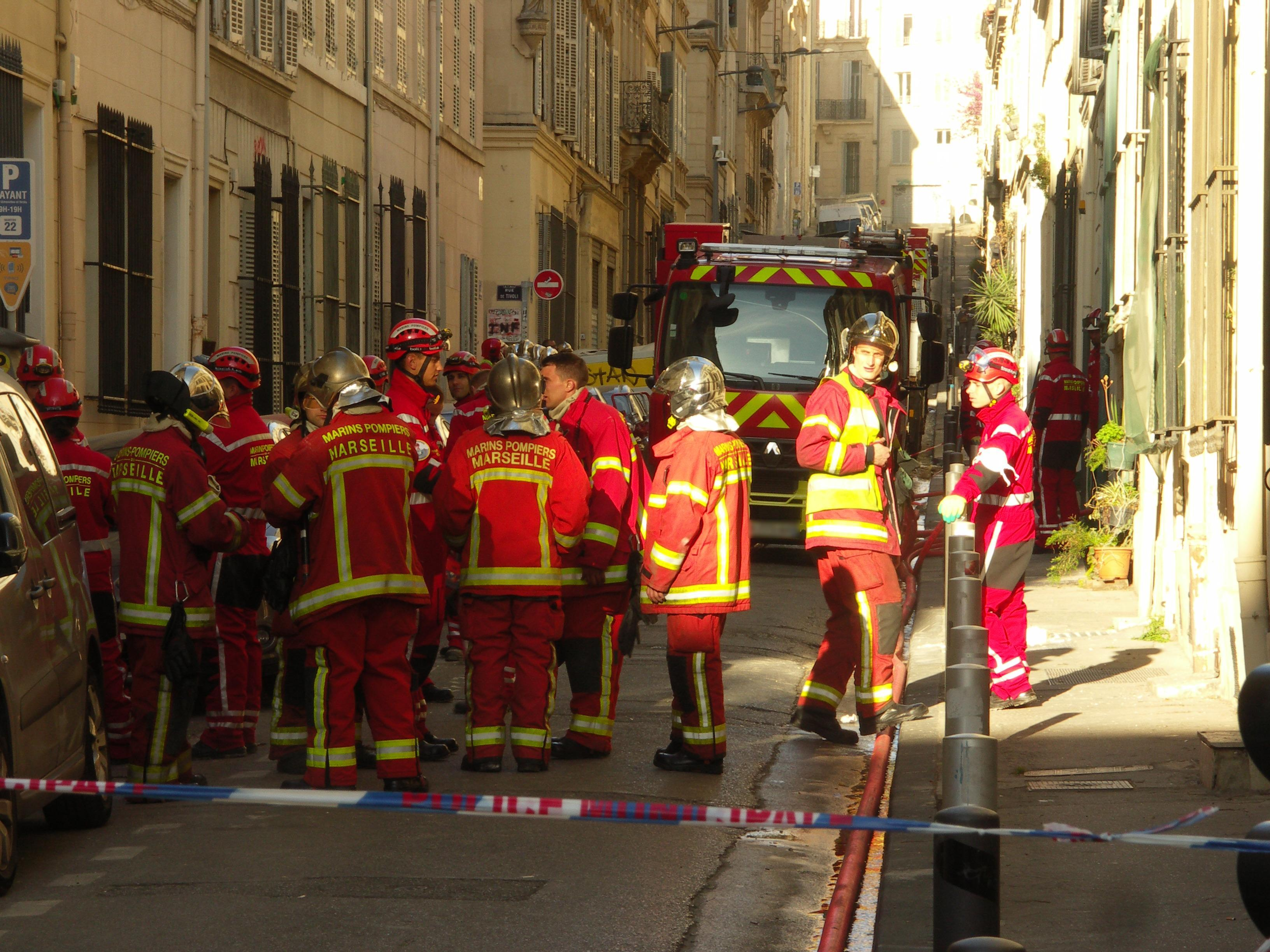
- Date: 8 April 2023
- Time: 12:40 am (CEST, UTC+2)
- Location: 15 Rue de Tivoli, Marseille, France
- Type: Building collapse
- Cause: Explosion (suspected gas leak)
- Deaths: 8
- Injuries: 5
- Displaced: ~200

On 8 April 2023, a building collapsed in Marseille, a city in southern France, killing eight people. In the event, two buildings exploded and fell, while a third partially collapsed and caught fire, complicating rescue operations. Although the origin of the explosion is yet uncertain, a gas leak may have played a role. The fallen buildings were not known to have any structural issues, according to the mayor of Marseille.

== Collapse ==
An explosion occurred at approximately 1:40 am local time, leading to the destruction of a four-story building in a Mediterranean port city. The force of the explosion was significant enough to cause nearby buildings to partially crumble. Rescue efforts faced difficulties due to an ongoing fire beneath the debris.

== Casualties ==
Approximately 24 hours following the explosion, two bodies were discovered amidst the wreckage. The next day, three additional bodies were found. Initially, at least six individuals were reported as missing right after the incident. Additionally, five individuals from nearby buildings suffered minor injuries.

== Rescue Operations ==
Rescue personnel, including firefighters and urban search and rescue specialists, dedicated themselves tirelessly throughout the night and into the subsequent day to locate survivors. Nonetheless, their endeavors were made more challenging by a fire smoldering deep within the debris.

== Investigation ==
The cause was under investigation, with one potential factor being a gas leak. The commencement of the inquiry was hindered by the intense heat generated by the fire.

== Reactions ==
The French president Emmanuel Macron responded to the incident by sharing his views, and support centers were provided for individuals who were harmed.

== Aftermath ==
Roughly 200 individuals were evacuated from buildings in close proximity to the explosion site. Mayor Benoit Payan conveyed sadness and sympathy regarding the event and reassured the public that all municipal services were fully dedicated to ongoing search and rescue operations.

== See also ==
- 2018 Marseille building collapse, after a lack of maintenance
