= Piplodi =

Village in Rajasthan, India

Piplodi पिपलोदी
- Village
- Location within Rajasthan Location within India
- Coordinates: 24.2550695°N 76.7324414°E
- Country: India
- State: Rajasthan
- District: Jhalawar
- Tehsil: Manohar Thana
- Gram Panchayat: Manohar Thana

Government
  - Type: Democratic
  - Member of Parliament Jhalawar-Baran (Lok Sabha constituency): Dushyant Singh (BJP)
  - Member of Legislative Assembly Atru-Baran Legislative constituency: Govind Prasad (BJP)

Population (2011)
  - Total: 711
- Demonym: Rajasthani

Languages
  - Official: Hindi, English
  - Native: Hadoti
- Time zone: UTC+5:30 (IST)
- PIN: 326037
- Sex ratio: 953 ♀/♂

Piplodi is a small village in the Manohar Thana tehsil of Jhalawar district, Rajasthan.

== Demographics ==
According to the 2011 Population Census, it has 148 families and a total population of 711, with 364 males and 347 females. Children aged 0-6 make up 18.99% of the population, totaling 135. The village's average sex ratio is 953, which is higher than Rajasthan's average of 928. However, the child sex ratio is 753, lower than the state's average of 888. Piplodi's literacy rate of 55.38% in 2011 was lower than Rajasthan's average of 66.11%. Male literacy in the village was 66.20%, while female literacy was 44.64%.

== Notable incidents ==
=== Government school roof collapse ===
On 25 July 2025, roof of a government primary school collapsed. The collapse, which happened during school hours as students were preparing for morning prayers, resulted in seven fatalities and numerous injuries among the 40 to 60 students believed to be in the building.
