= Dharwad building collapse =

Disaster in Dharwad which occurred on 19 July 2019

2019 Dharwad building collapse
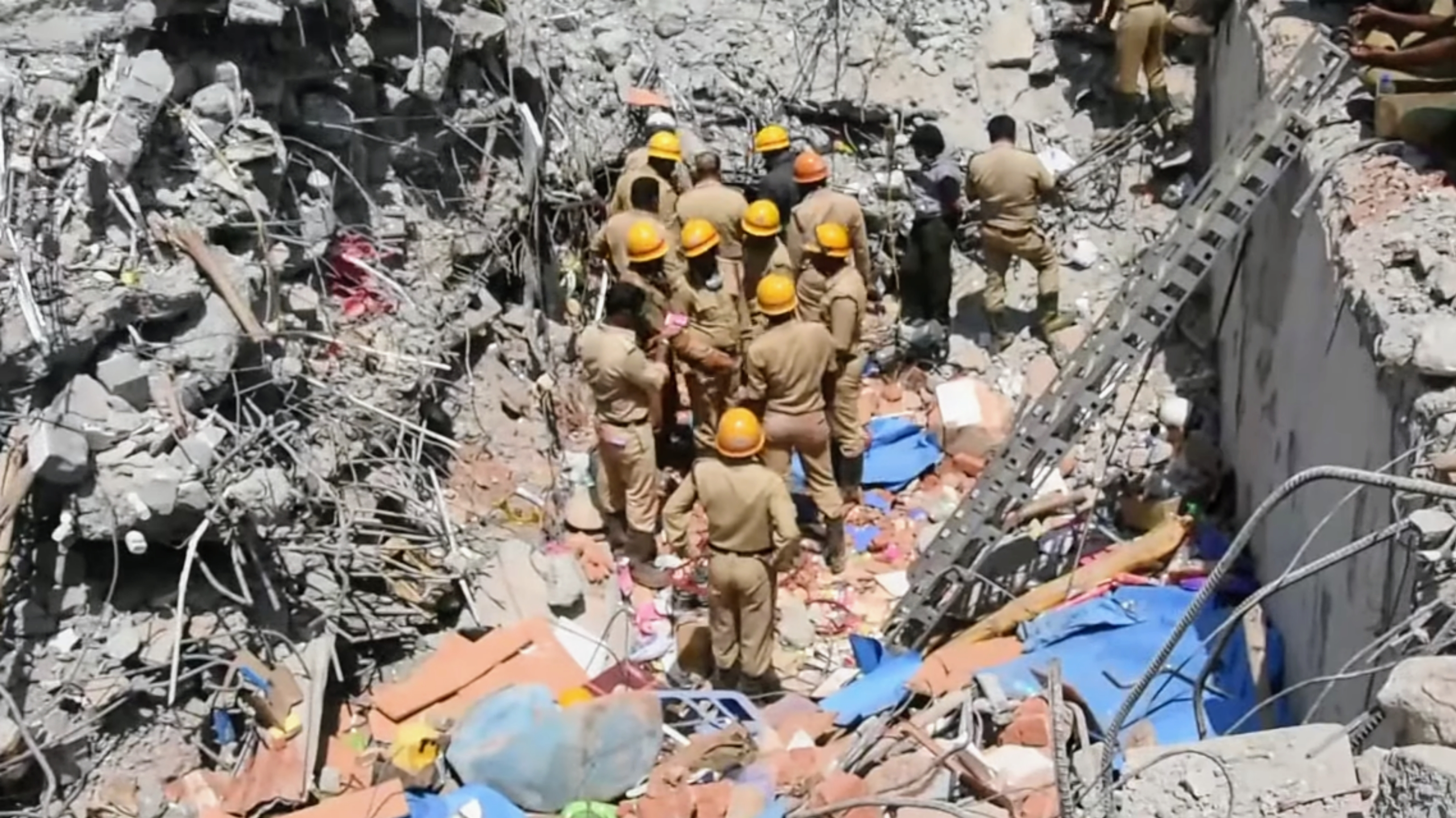
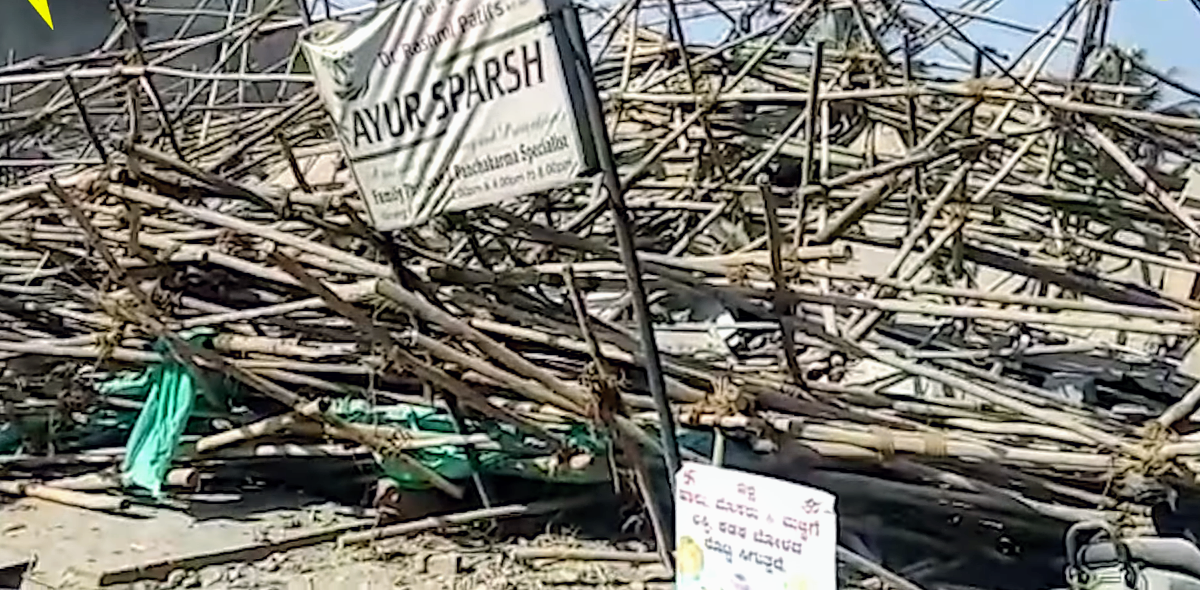
- (top) Rescuers rescuing the trapped. (bottom) Visual after the building collapse on the 4th day of the incident.
- Date: 19 March 2019
- Time: Around afternoon (Indian standard time)
- Location: Dharwad, Karnataka, India; Kumareshwar Nagar; North West Dharwad; 15°28′22″N 74°59′30″E
- Cause: Building collapse
- Deaths: 19
- Injuries: 70

On 19 March 2019 an multi-storey under-construction commercial complex in Kumareshwar Nagar in Dharwad, Karnataka collapsed, 19 people died and 50 more were injured in the accident. This collapse is considered one of the worst tragedies of Dharwad city.

== Incident ==
On 19 March 2019 an multi-storey under-construction commercial complex in Kumareshwar Nagar of Dharwad, Karnataka collapsed, 19 people died and 50 more were injured in the accident.[1]This building collapse is considered as one of the worst tragedies of Dharwad city.

== Reactions ==
The Chief minister of Karnataka, HD kumarswamy visited the injured and the site of the accident. He refused to make any political statements.The Prime minister of India Narendra Modi also mourned the victims of the incident through Twitter.

== Background ==
The architect of the building that collapsed and killed 19 persons in March 2019 in Dharwad has been granted bail. The court noted that the structural engineer had issued a stability certificate after visiting the construction site and the architect cannot, at this point of time, be held accountable for allegedly using low quality construction material. The police have charged several persons, including employees of the local corporation. Vivek Laxmansa Pawar, the architect, is one of the accused.

The building was coming up on 9 guntas of land purchased by Sri Renukadevi Constructions. The basement and two parking basements were ready and there was permission to occupy it. The police say that the architect, owners and building engineers are responsible for the safety as the rest of building was still under construction. The police allege that work was undertaken using low quality materials in the knowledge of the architect, building owners and engineers. Three months after the collapse, Vivek was taken into custody.
