= Ma Tau Wai Road building collapse =

2010 building collapse in Hong Kong

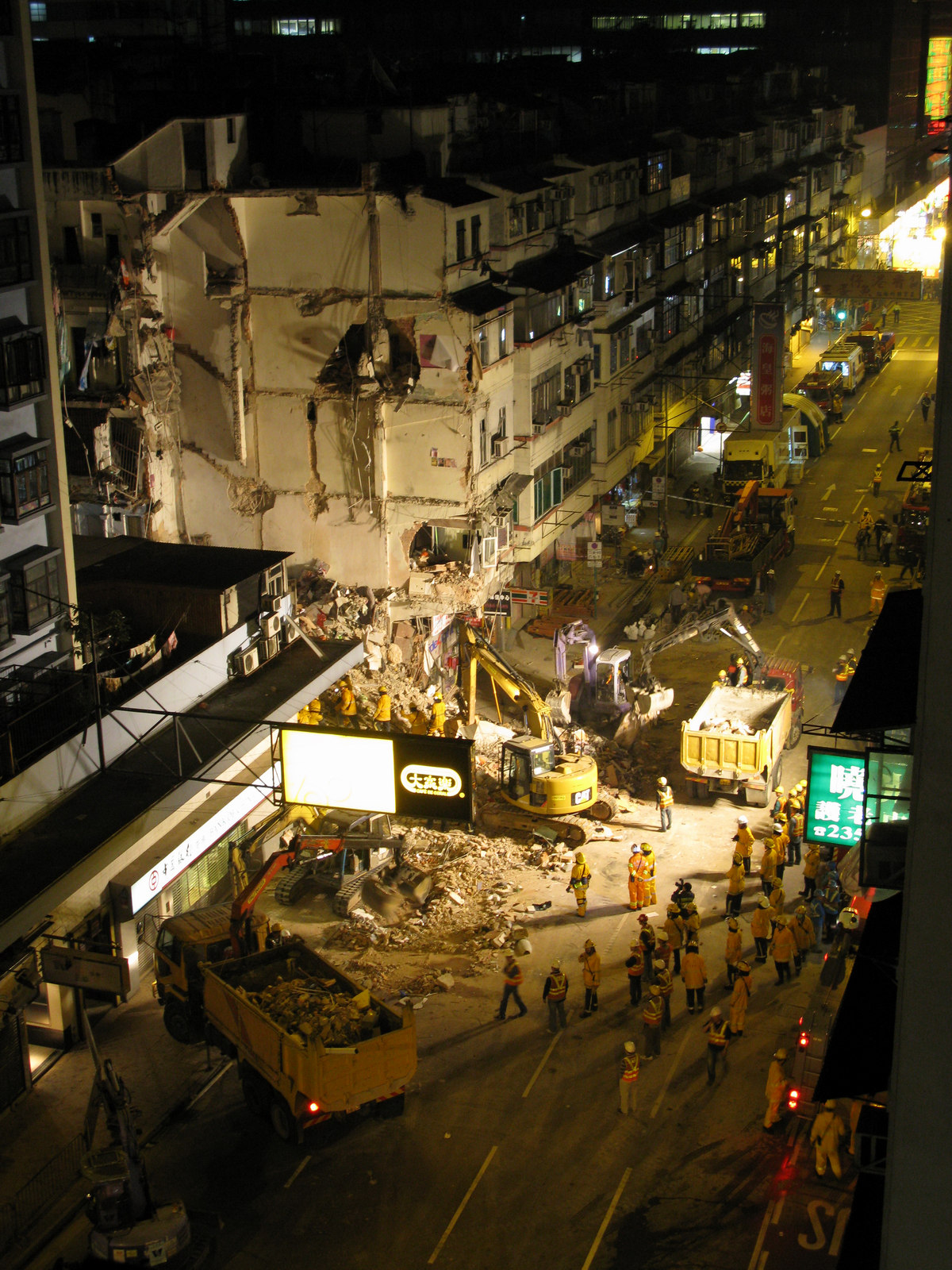
- Scene of the building collapse viewed from top
- Date: 29 January 2010
- Time: 13:40 (HKT)
- Location: 45J Ma Tau Wai Road, Hung Hom, Hong Kong
- Type: Structural failure
- Deaths: 4
- Injuries: 2

On 29 January 2010, a rundown five-storey tong lau residential building at Ma Tau Wai Road of Hong Kong collapsed, killing four and injuring two. The collapse of the building was likely triggered by the renovation of a ground floor shop which disturbed the load-bearing walls. It was the most serious building collapse in Hong Kong in several decades. The tong lau, including the collapsed and those nearby which were also damaged by the collapse, were later redeveloped.

== Background ==
A row of 18 tong lau were built in September 1955, stretching from 43A to 45J of Ma Tau Wai Road, in Hok Yuen of Hung Hom, Kowloon. They were mostly five-storey (with a mezzanine floor) tenement building of reinforced concrete construction. Each floor housed four apartments of around 150 square feet (14 square metres), which in some cases were further partitioned by their owners. The building at 45J, situated at the end of the row, comprised a G/F unit with an approved cockloft over and 1/F to 4/F approved with one flat on each floor for domestic use. Since May 1991, flats in it were sub-divided for rent. Tenants include Chinese immigrants, South Asians, and prostitutes.

The Buildings Department had issued numerous order to clear the unauthorised structures on the rooftop and on the ground floor, with one of them in June 2009, but were largely ignored. The department carried out an inspection in November 2009 after receiving complains, and a follow-up in December. At the time of the inspection, the extent of the symptoms did not indicate the gravity of the situation, and no imminent structural danger was noted. On 13 January 2010, weeks before the collapse, the department issued another statutory building repair order, demanding the owners to refurnish the failing concrete walls by July.

== Collapse ==
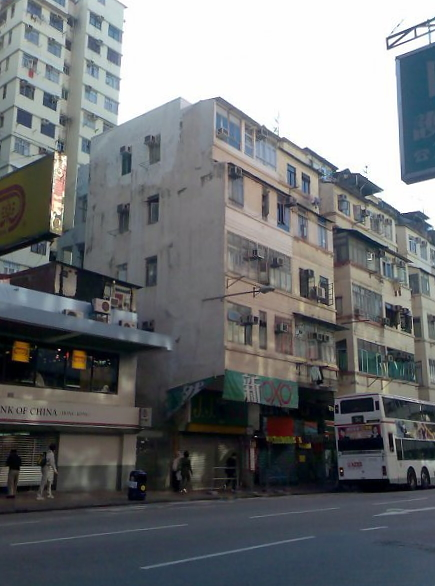
Tong lau at 45J Ma Tau Wai Road in November 2008

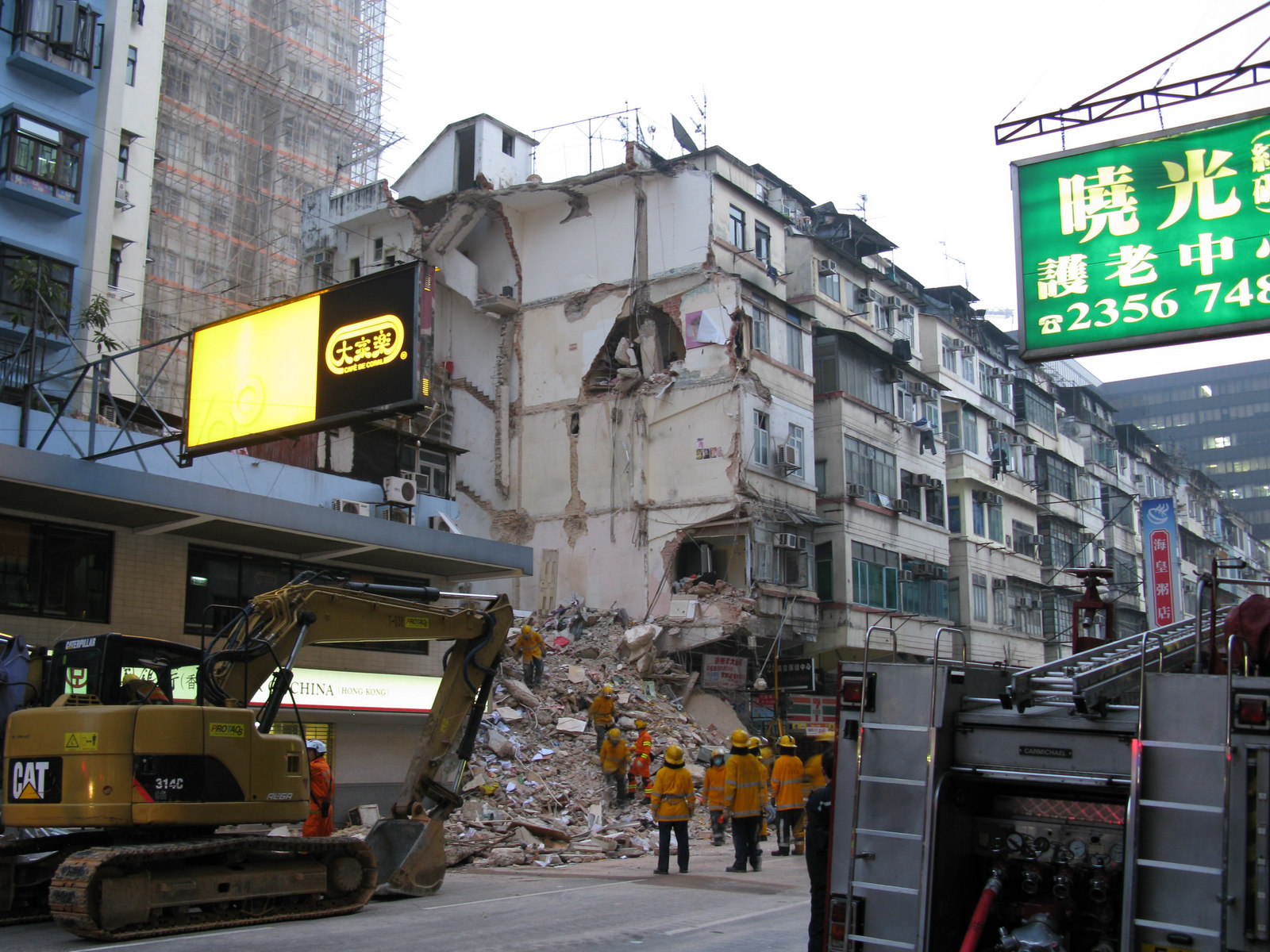
After the collapse, with two large holes at 45H tong lau

The tong lau was already decaying and structurally weak at the time of the accident. In the afternoon of 29 January, renovation work was being carried out on the commercial unit located on the ground floor of the building. It is speculated that construction workers had accidentally damaged the load-bearing walls during the unauthorised renovation. The five workers noticed signs of an imminent collapse and rushed out to raise the alarm. Some residents were alerted and left quickly, but others took it as a false alarm as the building looked normal. A couple evacuated seconds before the entire building caved in.

The police received reports that a resident was left stranded on the second floor of the tong lau, and the firefighters rushed to the scene having received an emergency call from a passer-by. Just at their arrival, at around 1:40 p.m., fifteen minutes after the alarm, the building collapsed from the bottom. Within seconds the tong lau turned into debris of two-storey high. Two large holes with bricks and reinforced concrete could be seen on the exterior of the neighbouring 45H tong lau, which was also heavily damaged.

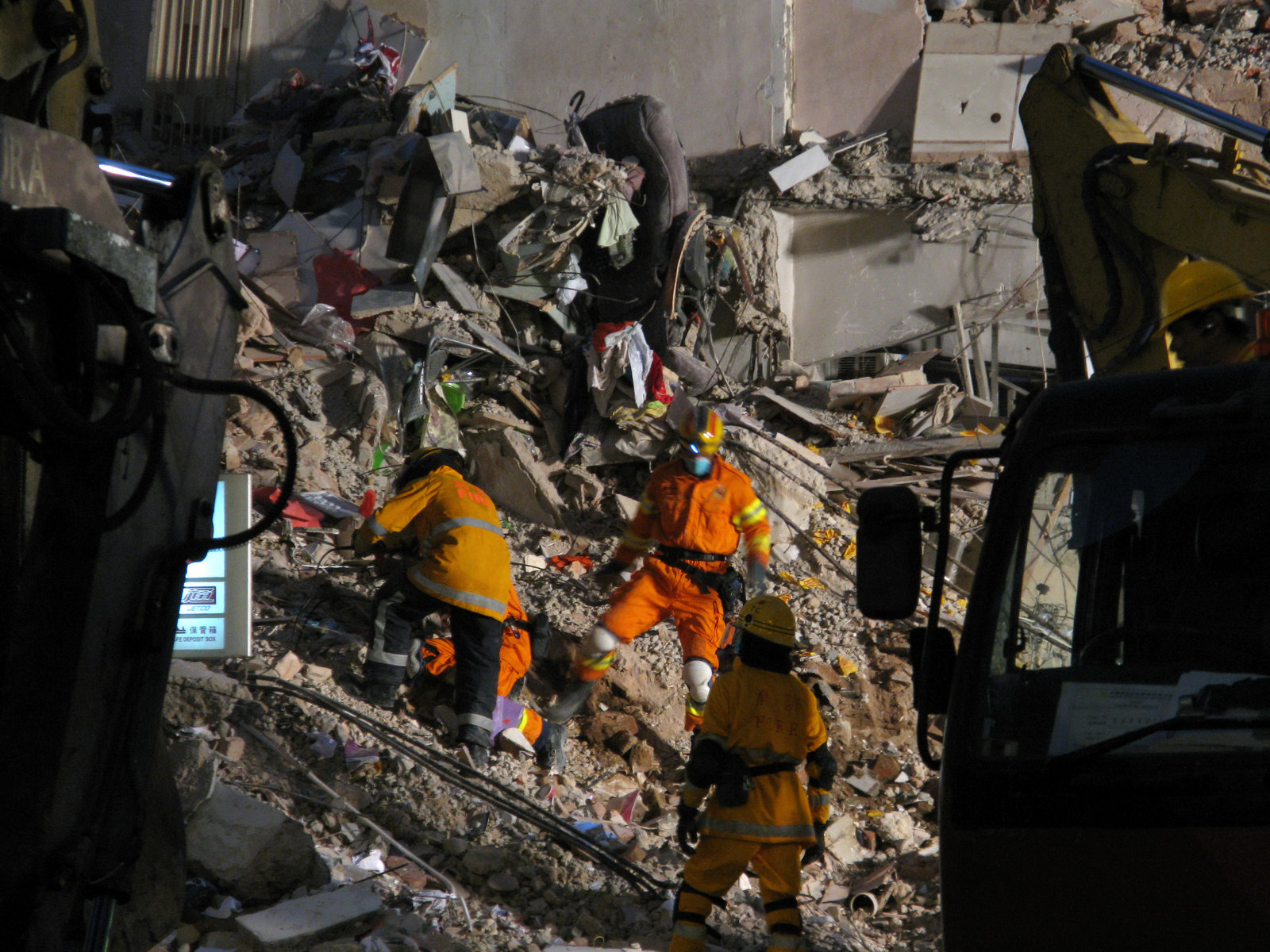
Firefighters searching for survivors in the rubbles

Several hundred emergency workers were deployed in the ensuing rescue operation, which had to take place under adjacent buildings that were themselves subject to collapse at any moment. Temporary reinforcements were erected to support and stabilise the remaining structures to give added protection to the rescue teams. An elderly woman, as well as a youth who returned to the building to alert her, were trapped in parts that had not yet collapsed for hours.

Two were injured by the debris. Four tenants of 45J tong lau died in the collapse, aged from 20 to 46. They lived on the second or the third floor of the building. Three bodies were found in the evening, and the last on the next day. One of the deaths was a 20-year-old secondary school student who was preparing for the A-Level Examination.

Chief Executive Donald Tsang, development minister Carrie Lam, and security minister Ambrose Lee visited the site to inspect the rubble. Residents in the adjoining blocks were subsequently relocated to temporary shelters in the immediate aftermath and then on to interim housing at public estates.

== Aftermath ==
The case was the first of its type in several decades. Because this type of building is typical of many over the territory, the tragedy raised new awareness amongst the public of the potential dangers faced by residents of such buildings. A thorough investigation into this particular incident, as well as a plan to prevent similar cases from occurring was ordered by the government. The approximately four thousand buildings of the same classification that were constructed before 1960 were subsequently earmarked for inspection within one month.

=== Redevelopment ===
Tong lau at 45G and 45H Ma Tau Wai Road were deemed to be structurally unsafe and subsequently sealed off. Tong lau at 45E, 45F, and some flats in 49 were closed for around half a month until reinforcement works were completed to ensure safety. Cracks appeared between buildings of 45A and 45B. Both buildings were cordoned off temporarily and reopened to tenants later. In February 2010, the Urban Renewal Authority announced redevelopment together with other blocks in the row. The project was later named “eResidence” (煥然懿居) and was finished in May 2020.

== See also ==
- 26 blocks scandal
