= 2012 collapse of Rio de Janeiro buildings =

- Date: 25 January 2012
- Time: 8:33PM
- Location: Rio de Janeiro, Brazil; 22°54′30.42″S 43°10′36.89″W
- Also known as: Vieira Fazenda office block collapse
- Cause: Illegal Renovations
- Deaths: 17
- Injuries: 6+

The January 25, 2012 Vieira Fazenda office block collapse involved the progressive collapse of 3 commercial office buildings, split by R. Vieira Fazenda street in the municipality of Praça Floriano, Rio de Janeiro, Brazil.

The three buildings involved were (from west to east): Building 1 (a 22-story building located at Av. Alm. Barroso, 6 - Centro, Rio de Janeiro, 20031-000, Brazil), Building 2 (a 23-story building located at Av. Alm. Barroso, 22 - Centro, Rio de Janeiro, 20031-000, Brazil) and Building 3 (a 6-story building located at Av. Rio Branco, 180 - Centro, Rio de Janeiro, 20040-003, Brazil).

At 8:33 PM, the 23-story Building 2, began collapsing in the eastward direction towards the 6-story Building 3, which was located on the opposite side of R. Vieira Fazenda street. Building 2 was structurally connected to the adjoining 22-story Building 1, which caused it to pull Building 1 laterally eastward during its collapse. This extreme lateral shift caused the failure of enough support columns to result in the collapse of Building 1. As Building 2 continued its collapse in the eastward direction, its debris crashed through the roof and western load bearing wall of the 6-story Building 3, causing it to collapse as well.

A total of 17 people were killed in the disaster. The initial collapse of the 23-story Building 2, was due to structural failure. Regulators said that any construction done violated local building codes as there were no construction permits on file for the building.

== Aftermath ==
By January 31, 2012, Rio officials proposed the creation of new regulations, including periodic reports on building's structural conditions, and more rigorous enforcement of the current regulations.
