= Blåbärskullen transmitter =

Coordinates: 59.836°N 12.867°E

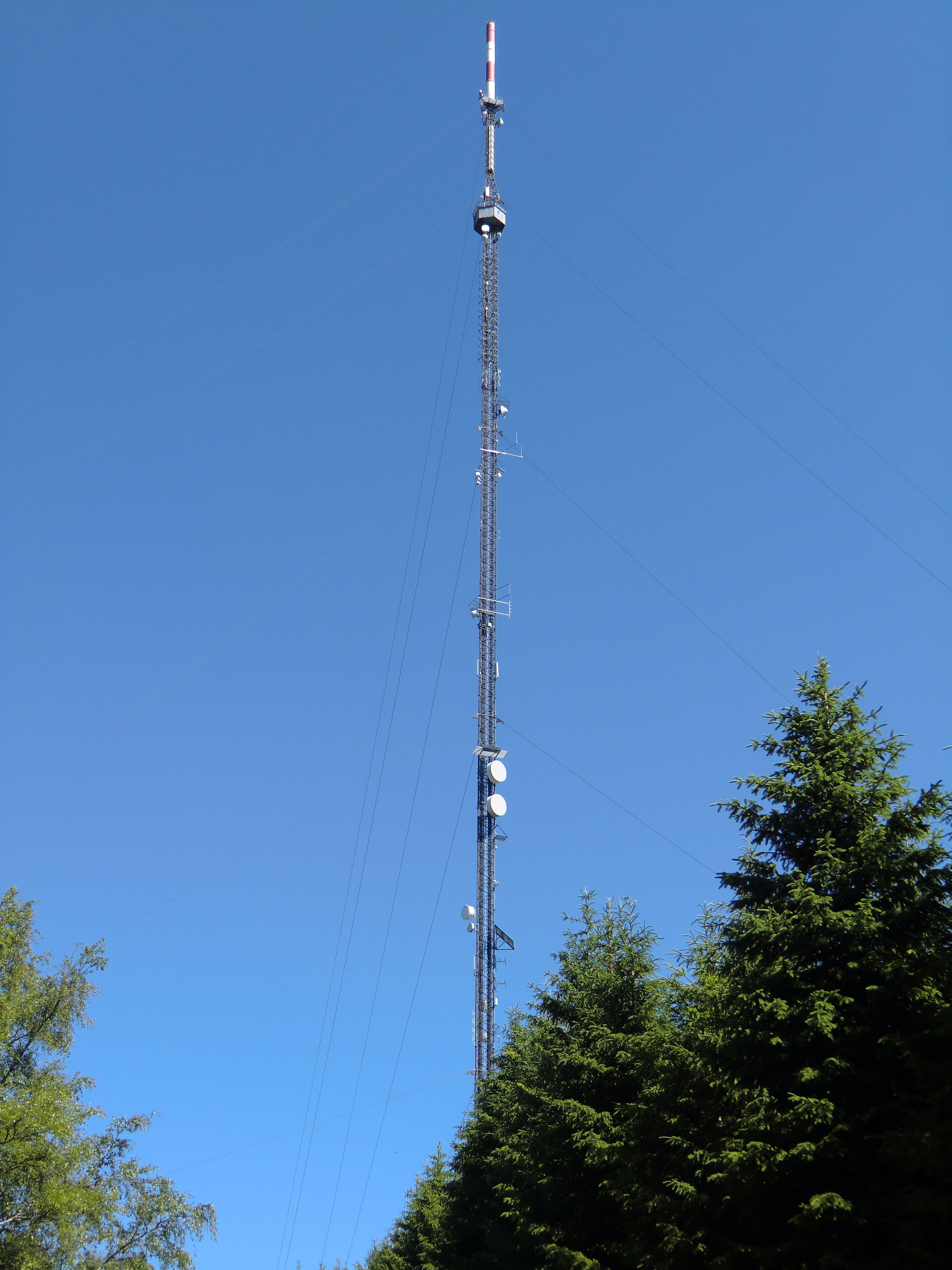
Blåbärskullen transmitter

Blåbärskullen transmitter (Swedish: Blåbärskullenmasten) is a facility for FM/TV-broadcasting at Sunne in Sweden, which went in service on September 2, 1960. It used as antenna tower a 323 metres (1,060 ft) tall guyed mast, which was at time of completion one of the tallest structures in Sweden. On December 27, 1979, the top of the mast with the TV-broadcasting antennas fell down as result of an excessive build-up of ice.

Afterwards a 72 metres (236 ft) tall temporary mast was erected in Ås, while the old mast was now 274 metres (899 ft) tall. The mast was equipped afterwards with new broadcasting antennas.
