= Nagpada =

- Neighbourhood
- Location within Mumbai
- Coordinates: 18°57′53″N 72°49′50″E
- Country: India
- State: Maharashtra
- District: Mumbai City
- City: Mumbai

Government
  - Type: Municipal Corporation
  - Body: Brihanmumbai Municipal Corporation (MCGM)

Languages
  - Official: Marathi
- Time zone: UTC+5:30 (IST)
- PIN: 400008
- Area code: 022
- Civic agency: BMC

Nagpada is a neighbourhood in South Mumbai.

The Prakritized form of the Sanskrit name "Nag-patakha" is mentioned as a name of Nagpada in the 15th-17th century Marathi-language text Mahikavatichi Bakhar. The place derives its name from a local Shiva temple, and abode of Naag or the snake wound around Shiva's neck. It has a community basketball court.

In 2005, Nagpada was the location of the Sadaf Manzil building collapse.

In April 2018, the Nagpada junction was beautified with a 25 metre national flag along with a mural dedicated to Bharat Ratna Abul Kalam Azad. The area was a meeting point for pre-independence gatherings and has witnessed many political movements during the pre-independence era. It was designed by architect Hafeez Contractor and inaugurated by Mumbai Mayor Vishwanath Mahadeshwar.
