= Sadaf Manzil =

Building in India that collapsed in 2005

Coordinates: 18.963018°N 72.831086°E

Sadaf Manzil was the name of a four-storey residential building in Nagpada, Mumbai which collapsed on 23 August 2005 killing 11 residents and leaving 24 others injured. It was a 100-year-old building; the area including it had passed an inspection by two MHADA engineers three days before the collapse. In 2008, the engineers were convicted of negligence charges and each sentenced to 4.5 years in prison.
