= Manohar Thana =

Manohar Thana Manohar Pura
- Census town
- Nickname: M T
- Location in Rajasthan, India Manohar Thana (India)
- Coordinates: 24°14′15.94″N 76°48′7.24″E
- Country: India
- State: Rajasthan
- District: Jhalawar District distance-90km
- Founder: King Manohar Bheel
  - Density: 9,227/km^{2} (23,900/sq mi)

Languages
  - Official: Hindi, [Hadoti]
- Time zone: UTC+5:30 (IST)
- ISO 3166 code: RJ-IN
- Vehicle registration: RJ-

Manohar Thana is a census town in Jhalawar district in the Indian state of Rajasthan.

== Demographics ==
As of 2001 India census, Manohar Thana had a population of 9227. Males constitute 52% of the population and females 48%. Manohar Thana has an average literacy rate of 64%, higher than the national average of 59.5%: male literacy is 73%, and female literacy is 54%. In Manohar Thana, 18% of the population is under 6 years of age.

== Notable people ==
- Vitthal Prasad Sharma, politician
