= Lalita Park building collapse =

2010 building collapse in New Delhi, India

The Lalita Park building collapse occurred at 8:15 p.m. local time on 15 November 2010 in the Indian city of Delhi. The 15-year-old building was in the Lalita Park neighborhood, near Lakshmi Nagar in East Delhi close to the Yamuna River. The building housed about 200 people, mostly poor migrant families, but also some small businesses.

== Collapse ==
A fifth floor was under construction. The building was two floors higher than legally allowed, and its foundation had been weakened by water damage from recent flooding in the region. At least 67 people were killed and 73 were injured in the collapse.

== Aftermath ==
A magisterial inquiry into the incident was ordered. Under Section 304 of the Indian Penal Code, a charge of culpable homicide not amounting to murder was registered against the building's owner, Amrit Singh. Singh fled but was later captured. The Government of Delhi announced an ex gratia of Rs 2 lakh each to the families of those killed and Rs 1 lakh to the injured.

== See also ==
- List of parks in Delhi
