= Knick-Ei =

Sports hall in Halstenbek, Germany

Coordinates: 53°37′57″N 9°50′29″E

Knick-Ei ("dented egg") was the nickname of a sports hall located at the corner of Feldstraße and Bahnhofstraße in the city of Halstenbek, located in Pinneberg county in the state of Schleswig-Holstein in northern Germany. The nickname refers to the hall's dome-shaped roof which collapsed twice during construction. The sports hall was never operational and was eventually demolished in 2007. The building's official name was "Sporthalle Feldstraße".

== Design, planning and construction ==
In 1992, the Halstenbek city council voted to spend 5 million Deutschmarks on the construction of a new sports hall on a property on Feldstraße formerly occupied by a tree nursery. In 1993, the council approved the design submitted by architects Poitiers & Partner from Hamburg. Architect André Poitiers' design featured an underground field under an oval glass dome, with locker rooms and equipment rooms also located below the ground and around the field. During the planning, the estimated cost already rose to more than 12 million Deutschmarks. Construction began in September 1995. In 1996, the estimated total cost had reached 15.6 million Deutschmarks.

== The first collapse ==
In the early morning hours of February 5, 1997, the partially completed dome collapsed during severe weather. The girders supporting the dome damaged the scaffolding below. As the collapse occurred at night, it only resulted in material damage. In the aftermath of the collapse, experts determined that the dome had collapsed solely due to the severe weather conditions and that the structural design of the dome was flawless. Therefore, the decision was made to rebuild the dome.

== The second collapse ==
In June 1998, two months before the scheduled opening at the beginning of the new school year, the dome, which had been completed in the meantime, collapsed again. This time, the city of Halstenbek's administration filed lawsuits against all companies involved in the construction in order to determine who was responsible and liable for the damage caused by the collapse.

== Legal proceedings, petitions and the attempt to rebuild the dome ==
After the second collapse, the city of Halstenbek attempted to settle out of court with the companies involved in the construction of the sports hall, demanding a certain percentage of the amount needed to rebuild the dome from each company. In 2000, the company responsible for the structural design of the dome, Schlaich Bergermann & Partner from Stuttgart, refused to contribute to the funding. The company was subsequently brought to trial.

Despite the uncertainty regarding the compensation for the losses caused by the collapses and the ongoing legal proceedings, in 2001 the city council decided to rebuild the dome at an estimated cost of 2.6 million Deutschmarks. The structural design was to be revised and the works on the dome were to be conducted by companies not previously affiliated with the construction of the sports hall. The revision of the structural design added further to the cost, as did the fact that the rooms surrounding the field had to be heated 24/7 to keep them free of mold, since rain leaking through the collapsed dome had caused mold to grow in the field's floor.

The rising cost prompted the residents of Halstenbek to protest against the council's decision. 2200 residents (17% of the city's population) signed a petition against the reconstruction, which was rejected by the county for formal reasons. The council members of Bündnis 90/Die Grünen (the green party), who had voted against the reconstruction, sued against the county's decision to reject the petition. In July 2002, the administrative court of the state of Schleswig-Holstein decided that the petition had to be considered by the District Administrator. In September of the same year, the county conducted a binding opinion poll among the residents of Halstenbek. 5409 (50.7%) votes were cast in favor of the reconstruction, 5266 (49.3%) against it. After the city council elections held on March 2, 2003, the supporters of the reconstruction had a clear majority within the council.

The revision of the structural design was completed by November 2003 and the completion date was set so that the sports hall should have opened in the summer of 2005, at the beginning of the 2005/2006 school year. The reconstruction was halted by the city council in 2004 after the construction company submitted a cost estimate of 4.2 million Euros (8.2 million Deutschmarks). The city council issued a tender for the completion of the sports hall at a maximum cost of 2.5 million Euros. It was up to the applicants to decide whether they could retain the original dome-shaped roof at the allocated cost or not. For the first time, the council allowed alterations to the roof's design in order to keep the costs down. Applications were due in November 2004.

During October 2004, residents and council members opposing the reconstruction filed another petition signed by more than 2700 residents which was approved by the county's administration on November 30, 2004. The city council sued against the approval of the petition, thus preventing a second binding poll which was to be conducted on February 20, 2005, the same day on which the state parliament elections took place. The group opposing the reconstruction subsequently filed a request for an injunction against the city council to prevent them from immediately commencing the reconstruction by awarding a binding and definitive construction license to a company bidding for the tender.

After the District Administrator suggested an arbitration, talks between all parties involved were held between February and April 2005. As the talks did not lead to a settlement out of court, the legal proceedings continued until July 12, 2005. The administrative court's final decision was that the District Administrator's approval of the petition was lawful and that a lawsuit filed by the city council against the District Administrator was unfounded.

== Demolition ==
7 years after the second collapse, on July 18, 2005, the majority of the city council approved the demolition of the unfinished sports hall and the construction of a conventional, box-type sports hall at the same location. On August 15, the mayor exercised his power of veto against the decision and instead decided that the final word on the fate of the "dented egg" should be spoken by the residents of Halstenbek. At a turnout of 42%, 71% of the residents voted in favor of the demolition on December 11, 2005. The decision became final on January 30, 2006.

10 months later, the tender for the demolition was issued and was awarded to a Hamburg-based demolition company. The demolition cost 200.000 Euro and began in January 2007. The demolition was completed on March 20, 2007, more than 10 years after the first collapse. The foundation stone of the Knick-Ei was recovered during the demolition and was buried together with the foundation stone of the new sports hall built at the same site.

== Replacement ==
On September 19, 2007, Bielefeld-based construction company Goldbeck GmbH was awarded the contract to build a conventional sports hall at the now completely cleared site of the Knick-Ei. The construction was not funded by the city, instead, funding of the construction in based on a Public-Private-Partnership agreement. The city of Halstenbek currently pays any upkeep costs plus an annual installment of approximately €480,000 to the private investors. This agreement will end after 25 years of operation, at that time, the replacement sports hall will become property of the city of Halstenbek. Construction of the new hall, which has a length of 45.67 metres, a width of 34.9 metres and a height of 9 metres, started in December 2007. On September 5, 2008, this hall, which has a ground area of 2115 m^{2} and three sport areas, each with a size of 27 meters × 15 meters, was inaugurated .

== Compensation and total cost ==
On April 17, 2007, a court in Schleswig ruled, based on expert testimony, that the collapses in 1997 and 1998 were due to flaws in the structural design developed by Schlaich, Bergermann & Partner. A settlement was reached, awarding the city of Halstenbek 80% of the approximately €2.7 million lost due to the collapses. From initial planning to demolition, the city spent approximately €9 million.

Another flaw of the dome-shaped roof was apparent ever since it was temporarily completed in 1998: the large glass panes at the lower end of the dome reflected sunlight towards the neighbouring houses, even after the dome collapsed. The city's administration therefore had the glass panes causing the reflections spraypainted black.

== Media coverage ==
After the two collapses, which were covered by media throughout Germany, the rest of the Knick-Ei's story up to the completion of its demolition was primarily covered by regional media. On two more occasions, the Knick-Ei received the attention of the national media:

- On January 2, 2006, the roof of the city of Bad Reichenhall's ice rink collapsed under the load of snow after several days of severe snowfall, killing 15 people, among them 12 children. Subsequent investigations revealed both design flaws of the roof and the use of materials of inferior quality during construction. Several halls with similar designs were found to have the same flaws which had not been discovered by the responsible authorities at the time when they were built. The Knick-Ei was sometimes quoted as another example for a sports hall whose design flaws should have been discovered prior to construction.
- On January 18 and 19, 2007, hurricane "Kyrill" swept across Europe. The weather conditions were so severe that Deutsche Bahn decided to completely shut down railway operations nationwide. During the storm, an 8.4 m long steel girder, weighing 1.35 tons, loosened from the front of Berlin Hauptbahnhof, which had been opened just a few months earlier in May 2006, and fell 40 meters to the ground, causing material damage. The Hamburger Abendblatt reported that the construction design for the building's front came from Schlaich, Bergermann & Partner, the same company responsible for the collapses of the Knick-Ei's roof. National media picked up the report. Schlaich, Bergermann & Partner refused to comment on both incidents.

== Similar structures ==
The Great Glasshouse of the National Botanic Garden of Wales is from similar design and standing since 2000.
