= 2018 Marseille building collapse =

2018 French disaster

2018 collapse of Rue d'Aubagne
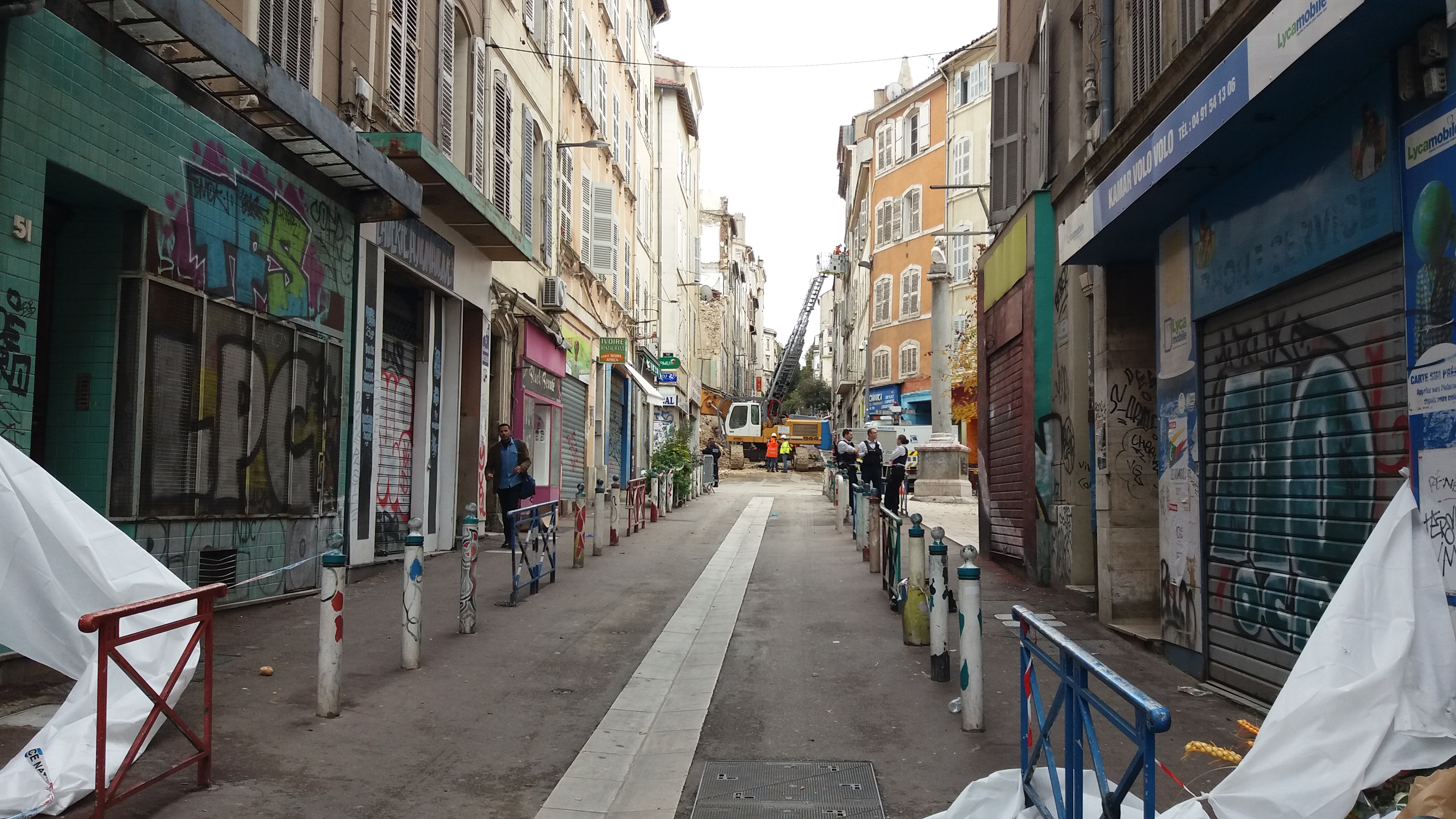
- Date: 5 November 2018
- Location: Marseille, France
- Deaths: 8

At 9 am on November 5, 2018, two buildings in Marseille, numbers 63 and 65 Rue d'Aubagne, collapsed in the center of Marseille, killing eight people in the crowded neighborhood of Noailles. Number 63 was unoccupied, belonging since 2016 to the economic improvement company Marseille Habitat, but number 65 was occupied with people living in the building. Eight bodies were found in the rubble, when the search for survivors came to an end on 9 November. Emergency services immediately demolished the building next to number 67, as it was unoccupied and equally fragile.

Officials evacuated at least 4,500 people from 578 dangerous buildings during the months following the accident, but many are still lodged in their "temporary" housing. Most of the evacuees were from the ethnic minorities living in these buildings, and were moved from their houses to safer accommodation. The management crisis became the norm: one year after the accident, the "Haute Comité au logement" spoke of a humanitarian crisis. Three years after the accident, 1,500 people still live in their temporary lodging.

After the collapse, the tenants of the houses in the center of Marseille cited neglect on the part of the town hall because most buildings in the center of Marseille are dilapidated and not maintained.

During a march to honour the victims on 10 November, which gathered 8,000 people, according to the authorities, a balcony collapsed, injuring three.

The indictments began in November 2020 with those of Marseille Habitat (owner of No. 63), Julien Ruas (close to Jean-Claude Gaudin and his deputy in charge of the risk management and prevention department), and the Liautard firm (co-ownership manager in charge of No. 65). The investigation could last for many years.

== Broader implications ==
The collapse revealed the dilapidated state of Marseille's housing (100,000 Marseillais live in slums according to the Fondation Abbé Pierre, and 13% of Marseille's housing is considered to be substandard), as well as the mayor's inaction.

In 2015, a report from the honorary inspector general of the administration of sustainable development titled "Private Real Estate in Marseille" ordered and made public by the minister of housing, Silvia Pinel, had already overwhelmed the municipality. It concluded that "100,000 people live in unsanitary housing in Marseille."

After the collapse, the Haut comité pour le logement des personnes défavorisées (High Committee for the Housing of Disadvantaged Persons) publicized on 21 November a report submitted to President Emmanuel Macron and Prime Minister Édouard Philippe with the evocative title "Marseille: From Housing to Humanitarian Crisis." In the report, it is claimed that "the collapses of the buildings on rue d'Aubagne were not accidental and unforeseeable events. They resulted from a continuity of dysfunction from public actors," thus pointing the finger at the City Council and the French government, reminding that "the prefect could have given the city formal notice to investigate the claims of the city's insalubrity."

== In popular culture ==
The collapse, its build-up and aftermath were dramatised by the playwright Mathilde Aurier; her play, 65 Rue d’Aubagne, premiered at the city's Théatre de la Criée in January 2026.
