= List of bridge failures =

This is a list of bridge failures.

== Before 1800 ==
Bridge	Location	Country	Date	Construction type, use of bridge	Reason	Casualties	Damage	Comments
Milvian; Bridge	Rome	Rome	28 October 312	Wooden pontoon bridge replacing permanent stone bridge	Use by retreating Maxentian troops during the Battle of the Milvian Bridge	Unknown	Bridge unusable	
London; Bridge	London	England	17 October 1091	Wooden bridge	London tornado of 1091	Unknown	Bridge unusable	
Sint Servaasbrug	Maastricht	Holy Roman Empire	1275	Wooden bridge	The weight of a large procession	400	Bridge unusable	
Judith bridge	Prague	Kingdom of Bohemia	2 February 1342	Stone bridge	Severe flood	Unknown	Two-thirds of the 170 years old bridge collapsed or heavily damaged. One arch survived to this day. Charles Bridge was built next to its remains. Construction started in 1357 and ended in 1402.	Surviving arch of Judith bridge
Rialto; Bridge	Venice	Venetian Republic	1444	Wooden structure with central drawbridge.	Overload by spectators during a wedding	Unknown	Bridge total damage	

== 1800–1899 ==
Bridge	Location	Country	Date	Construction type, use of bridge	Reason	Casualties	Damage	Comments
Eitai Bridge (Eitai-bashi)	Tokyo (Edo)	Japan	20 September 1807 (Lunisolar 19 August)	Wooden beam bridge over River Sumida	Overloaded by festival	500–2000 killed	1 pier and 2 spans destroyed	Edo-Tokyo Museum
Ponte das Barcas	Porto	Portugal	29 March 1809	Wooden pontoon bridge over River Douro	Overloaded by thousands of people fleeing a bayonet charge of French Imperial Army led by Marshal Soult during the First Battle of Porto	4000 killed	Several spans destroyed. Bridge reconstructed, dismantled in 1843	
Saalebrücke bei Mönchen-Nienburg	Nienburg, Saxony-Anhalt	Germany	6 December 1825	Chain-stayed bridge with small bascule section	Poor materials, unbalanced load and vibrations by subjects singing to honour the duke	55 drowned or frozen to death	Bridge half damaged, other side demolished	
Broughton Suspension Bridge	Broughton, Greater Manchester	England	12 April 1831	Suspension bridge over River Irwell	Bolt snapped due to mechanical resonance caused by marching soldiers	0 dead, 20 injured	Collapsed at one end, bridge quickly rebuilt and strengthened	The rebuilt Broughton Suspension Bridge in 1883. This disaster caused the "break step" rule issued to UK soldiers.
Yarmouth suspension bridge	Great Yarmouth	England	2 May 1845	Suspension bridge	Spectators crowded the bridge over the River Bure to view a clown travel the river in a barrel. Their position shifted as the barrel passed; the suspension chains snapped and the bridge deck tipped over.	79 people drowned, mainly children.	Suspension chains snapped due to overload.	Contemporary illustration of the aftermath of the collapse
Dee Bridge	Chester	England	24 May 1847	Cast iron beam bridge over the River Dee	Overload by passenger train on faulty structure	5 killed	Bridge rendered unusable	The Dee bridge after its collapse. The failure was due to faulty design.
Ness Bridge	Inverness	Scotland	1849	Stone Bridge over River Ness	Flooding overwhelmed the 164-year-old bridge	Unknown	Either completely destroyed or damaged beyond repair	Rebuilt as a suspension bridge, which itself was replaced in 1961 due to inability to handle increased traffic.
Angers Bridge	Angers	France	16 April 1850	Suspension bridge over Maine River	Wind and possibly resonance of soldiers led to collapse	226 killed, unknown injured	Bridge total damage	The Angers Bridge after its collapse
Wheeling Suspension Bridge	Wheeling, West Virginia (then Virginia)	United States	17 May 1854	Suspension bridge carrying the National Road over the Ohio River	Torsional movement and vertical undulations caused by wind	No casualties	Deck destroyed; towers left intact and remain in use today	
Gasconade Bridge	Gasconade, Missouri	United States	1 November 1855	Wooden rail bridge	Inaugural train run conducted before temporary trestle work was replaced by permanent structure	31 killed, hundreds injured	Span from anchorage to first pier destroyed	
Desjardins Canal Bridge	Dundas, Ontario	Canada	12 March 1857	Rail bridge	Mechanical force due to broken locomotive front axle. Desjardins Canal disaster ensued.	59 killed		
Sauquoit Creek Bridge	Whitesboro, New York	United States	11 May 1858	Railroad trestle	Weight (two trains on the same trestle)	9 killed, 55 injured		
Springbrook Bridge	Between Mishawaka and South Bend, Indiana	United States	27 June 1859	Railroad embankment bridge	Washout	41 killed (some accounts of 60 to 70)		Known as the Great Mishawaka Train Wreck or the South Bend train wreck
Bull Bridge	Ambergate	England	26 September 1860	Cast iron rail bridge	Cast iron beam cracked and failed under weight of freight train	0 killed 0 injured	Total collapse of bridge	Section of broken girder
Wootton Bridge	Wootton	England	11 June 1861	Cast iron rail bridge	Cast iron beams cracked and failed	2 killed	Total damage to floor	Wootton Bridge crash, caused by a flawed design & unreliable cast iron, failed from a repair
Platte Bridge	St. Joseph, Missouri	United States	3 September 1861		Sabotage by Confederate partisans during US Civil War.	17–20 killed, 100 injured		
Chunky Creek Bridge	near Hickory, Mississippi	United States	1863		Debris build-up from winter flood shifted the bridge trestle.			
Rail bridge	New Hamburg, New York	United States	6 February 1871	Wooden trestle with drawbridge in center	Fire following explosion caused by train collision with derailed train	22 killed	Drawbridge collapsed into creek	1871 New Hamburg rail disaster
Train bridge	Wood River Junction, RI	United States	19 April 1873		Washaway	7 killed, 20 injured		Railroad Disaster at Meadow Brook, Rhode Island
Dixon Bridge (aka Truesdell Bridge)	Dixon, Illinois	United States	4 May 1873	Iron vehicular bridge (for pedestrians and carriages) over the Rock River	Large crowd assembled on one side to view baptism ceremony; bridge design flaw	46 killed 56 injured	Bridge was a total loss	The collapse of the Dixon (Ill.) Truesdell Bridge, May 4, 1873.
Portage Bridge	Portageville, New York	United States	5 May 1875	Wooden beam bridge over the Genesee River	Fire	0 killed 0 injured	Bridge was a total loss	Fire destroyed all but the concrete abutments
Ashtabula River Railroad Bridge	Ashtabula, Ohio	United States	29 December 1876	Wrought iron truss bridge	Possible fatigue failure of cast iron elements	92 killed, 64 injured	Bridge total damage	Ashtabula bridge disaster
Tay Rail Bridge	Dundee	Scotland	28 December 1879	Continuous girder bridge, wrought iron framework on cast iron columns, railway bridge	Faulty design, construction and maintenance, structural deterioration and wind load	75 killed (60 known dead), no survivors	Bridge unusable, girders partly reused, train damaged	Fallen Tay Bridge. Locomotive was saved from the Tay and was still in use 19 years later; known as "The Diver".
Honey Creek Rail Trestle	Boone County, Iowa	United States	6 July 1881	Railroad trestle	Flash flood washed out timbers supporting trestle	2 killed (one body never recovered)	Bridge rebuilt	Kate Shelley, who lived nearby, was able to warn the railroad to stop an oncoming passenger train.
Inverythan Rail Bridge	Aberdeenshire	Scotland	27 November 1882	Cast iron girder rail bridge	Hidden defects in cast iron caused collapse as train passed	5 killed, 17 injured	Bridge rebuilt	Crash scene after the accident. The Board of Trade issued warning about similar under-bridges.
Little Silver	New Jersey	United States	30 June 1882	Trestle railway bridge	Train derailment due to insecure railroad switch on the northbound side of the bridge.	3 killed, 65+ injured	Estimated $15,000 worth of damage to the bridge and cars combined. Bridge was repaired.	Several rail cars derailed and fell off the bridge into Parker's Creek. Ulysses S. Grant was a passenger.
Osijek railway bridge	Osijek	Hungary / Croatia border	23 September 1882	Railway bridge	Bridge collapsed into the flooding Drava river under the weight of a train	28	Washout by flood Collapsed wooden bridge later replaced by iron bridge.	
Camberwell Bridge	London	England	15 May 1884	Cast iron trough girder bridge over railway	Hidden defects in cast iron caused collapse of four girders	0 killed, 1 injured	Bridge rebuilt	
Bussey Bridge	Boston	United States	14 March 1887	Iron railroad bridge collapses under train	Poor design and maintenance	23 killed, 100+ injured	Bridge rebuilt	A drawing of the collapsed bridge.
Big Four Bridge	Louisville, Kentucky	United States	10 October 1888	Caisson and truss		12 died when caisson flooded, 4 died when beam broke, 21 died when truss fell into river		
Conemaugh Viaduct	Upriver from Johnstown, Pennsylvania	United States	31 May 1889	Stone,78-foot (24 m) high railroad bridge	Washed away by the Johnstown Flood	0	total loss	Main article: Johnstown Flood
Norwood Junction Rail Bridge	London	England	1 May 1891	Cast iron girder fails under passing train	Hidden defects in cast iron caused collapse	0 killed, 1 injured	Bridge rebuilt	
Münchenstein Rail Bridge	Münchenstein	Switzerland	14 June 1891	Wrought iron truss	Train falls through centre of bridge	71 killed, 171 injured		The railway bridge collapsed under a heavy train loaded with more than 500 passengers; more than 70 were killed.
Chester rail bridge	Chester, Massachusetts	United States	31 August 1893	Lattice truss bridge	Removed rivets caused bridge to collapse under the weight of a train	14 killed		
Point Ellice Bridge	Victoria, British Columbia	Canada	26 May 1896		Overloaded tram car collapses central span	47/53/50–60 killed (reports vary)		
Maddur railway bridge collapse	Maddur	India	2 October 1897		River in flood	150 drowned	AA	

== 1900–1949 ==
Bridge	Location	Country	Date	Construction type, use of bridge	Reason	Casualties	Damage	Comments
Dry Creek Bridge	Eden, Colorado	United States	7 August 1904	Wooden railway bridge	Sudden washout	111 killed, unknown injured	Bridge completely destroyed	
Egyptian Bridge	Saint Petersburg	Russian Empire	20 January 1905	Stone suspension bridge	Disputed	0 killed, 0 injured	Bridge rebuilt	The collapsed bridge
Portage Canal Swing Bridge	Houghton, Michigan	United States	15 April 1905	Steel swing bridge	Swing span struck by the steamer Northern Wave.	0 killed, 0 injured	Swing span rebuilt.	The damaged bridge. It was replaced by the Portage Lake Lift Bridge.
Cimarron River Rail Crossing	Dover, Oklahoma Territory	United States	18 September 1906	Wooden railroad trestle	Washed out under pressure from debris during high water	4-100+ killed	Entire span lost; rebuilt	Bridge was to be temporary, but replacement was delayed for financial reasons. Number of deaths is uncertain; estimates range from 4 to over 100.
Quebec Bridge	Quebec City	Canada	29 August 1907	Cantilever bridge, steel framework, railway bridge	Collapsed during construction: design error, bridge unable to support own weight	75 killed, 11 injured	Bridge completely destroyed.	Redesigned, and rebuilding continued through the 2nd partial collapse in 1916 (see below)
Romanov Bridge	now Zelenodolsk, Republic of Tatarstan	Russian Empire	22 November 1911	Railway bridge across the Volga River	Collapsed during construction: ice slip undermined scaffolding	13 confirmed killed, ~200 missing	Scaffold with workers fell on the ice, causing many to drown	Bridge was completed later. "Romanovsky" rail bridge, renamed Red Bridge after the revolution, designed by Nikolai Belelubsky was built in 1913.
Baddengorm Burn	Carrbridge, Highlands	Scotland	18 June 1914		Collapsed underneath train due to heavy rainfall and debris build-up from a road bridge wiped out further upstream	5 drowned, unknown injured	Complete loss, one railway carriage destroyed	Rebuilt with a longer, concrete span.
Division Street Bridge	Spokane, Washington	United States	18 December 1915	Steel framework, trolley car bridge	Collapsed a week after being resurfaced; poor steel, metal fatigue, and a previous impact by another bridge swept downstream during a flood	5–7 killed, 10 injured	Complete loss, plus two trolley cars destroyed	Replaced by a 3-vault concrete span
Quebec Bridge	Quebec City	Canada	11 September 1916	Cantilever bridge, steel framework, railway bridge	Central span slipped whilst being hoisted in place due to contractor error	11 killed, unknown injured	Central span dropped into the river, where it still lies today	Rebuilt and opened in December 1919 after almost two decades of construction.
Grand Avenue Bridge	Neillsville, Wisconsin	United States	2 August 1920	Steel overhead truss bridge, vehicular traffic	Believed weakened by heavy trucks hauling shale in prior months	1 killed, 0 injured	Bridge completely destroyed.	Replaced by concrete bridge the following year.
Greenfield Bridge	Pittsburgh, Pennsylvania	United States	18 June 1921	Wooden road bridge	Collapsed	0 killed, 0 injured	Bridge completely destroyed	Bridge had been closed to vehicular traffic due to structural weakness but was still used by pedestrians. Replaced with a new bridge in 1923.
Bridge	Jalón	Spain	22 November 1927		Bridge failed during passage of funeral procession	100 thrown into water		
Kärevere Bridge	Kärevere	Estonia	14 December 1928	48 m triple span beam bridge with reinforced concrete deck, motorway bridge over the Suur-Emajõgi river	Newly built bridge failed two days after commission accepted it (before opening for traffic), because of insufficient cement in concrete and design flaws	No casualties.	Bridge completely destroyed.	
Fremantle Railway Bridge	Fremantle, Western Australia	Australia	22 July 1926		Flood	0 killed, 0 injured		Load testing in 1926 on the repaired section of the bridge. Proposed replacement by combined road and railway bridge.
Seta River Bridge	Otsu	Japan	21 September 1934		Typhoon	11 killed, 216 injured		An express train derailed by the Muroto Typhoon on the Seta River Bridge, September 1934
Appomattox River Drawbridge	Hopewell, Virginia	United States	22 December 1935		Bus drove across the open drawbridge.	14 killed		
Falling Creek Bridge	Chesterfield County, Virginia	United States	1 September 1936	Wood and steel.	Truck crossing the bridge struck a tie rod causing collapse. One truck fell 15 feet to the creek bed, a second escaped to safety.	4 killed, 5 injured		
Kasai River Bridge	Kasaï	Belgian Congo	12 September 1937	Railway bridge	While under construction.			Began in 1935; construction never resumed.
Honeymoon Bridge (Upper Steel Arch Bridge)	Niagara Falls, New York – Niagara Falls, Ontario	United States – Canada	27 January 1938	Steel arch road bridge	Ice jam in gorge pushed bridge off foundations	0 killed, 0 injured	Bridge completely destroyed	Replaced in 1941 by the Rainbow Bridge
Sandö Bridge	Kramfors, Ångermanland	Sweden	31 August 1939	Concrete arch bridge	Collapsed during construction	18 killed	Complete loss of the main span	Received minimal media attention as WWII began the next day. The bridge was finished in 1943 as the longest concrete arch bridge in the world until 1964.
Tacoma Narrows Bridge	Tacoma, Washington	United States	7 November 1940	Road bridge, cable suspension with plate girder deck	Aerodynamically poor design resulted in aeroelastic flutter	0 killed, 0 injured (1 dog killed)	Bridge completely destroyed, no persons killed. One dog killed and three vehicles lost.	Became known as "Galloping Gertie", in the first 4 months after opening up until its collapse under aeroelastic flutter. Most major new bridges are now modelled in wind tunnels. Rebuilt in 1950; parallel span opened in 2007.
Theodor Heuss Bridge	Ludwigshafen	Germany	12 December 1940	Bridge of concrete, Motorway bridge	Collapsed during construction	Unknown	Bridge completely destroyed	Resulted in delay in completion of the motorway crossing of the Rhine until 1953
Chesapeake City Bridge	Chesapeake City, Maryland	United States	28 July 1942	Road bridge, vertical lift drawbridge	Tanker Franz Klasen rammed the movable bridge supports, causing collapse	Unknown	Central span completely destroyed	Bridge replaced by high-level tied-arch bridge in 1949
Deutz Suspension Bridge	Cologne	Germany	28 February 1945	Suspension road bridge	collapsed during repair work	unknown count of people killed	Total destruction	
Ludendorff Bridge	Remagen	Germany	17 March 1945	Truss railroad and pedestrian bridge	Battle damage incurred 7 March 1945	28 killed, 93 injured	Total destruction	Ludendorff Bridge on March 17, 1945, after the collapse
John P. Grace Memorial Bridge	Charleston, South Carolina	United States	24 February 1946	Steel cantilever truss automobile bridge	Three spans collapsed due to collision by the freighter Nicaragua Victory	5 killed		Three collapsed spans 240 feet (73 m) were replaced and stood until 2005 when the bridge was closed following the opening of the Arthur Ravenel Jr. Bridge
Inotani Wire Bridge	Toyama	Japan	22 September 1949			29 killed		Around 150 professors and educators from schools in the prefecture were in the area for a geological survey when a bolt bent and the suspension bridge collapsed, sending 33 people down into the Jinzu River. 29 people were killed or went missing and 4 people were injured.

== 1950–1999 ==
Bridge	Location	Country	Date	Construction type, use of bridge	Reason	Casualties	Damage	Comments
Duplessis Bridge	Trois-Rivières–Cap-de-la-Madeleine, Quebec	Canada	31 January 1951	Steel bridge	Structural failure due to adverse temperature	4 killed	Total destruction	Reconstructed
Bury Knowsley Street Station Footbridge	Bury	England	19 January 1952	Wooden footbridge with wrought iron frame and supports	Supports failed due to inadequate maintenance	2 killed, 173 injured	Bridge replaced	Bridge since demolished, due to closure of station
Harrow & Wealdstone Station Footbridge	Wealdstone	England	8 October 1952	Pedestrian footbridge	Struck by train(s) during accident	112 killed, 340 injured	Total destruction	It is not recorded how many casualties were due to the bridge collapse
Whangaehu River Rail Bridge	Tangiwai	New Zealand	24 December 1953	Railway bridge	Damaged by lahar minutes before passenger train passed over it.	151 killed. New Zealand's worst train disaster.	Bridge destroyed	
St. Johns Station Rail Bridge	Lewisham, South London	England	4 December 1957	Railway bridge	Two trains collided and smashed into supports, collapsing part of bridge onto the wreckage	90 killed, 173 injured	Bridge destroyed	Unknown how many deaths/injuries specifically due to bridge collapse, since its effect was to worsen the train wreck
Ironworkers Memorial Second Narrows Crossing	Vancouver, British Columbia	Canada	17 June 1958	Steel truss cantilever	Collapsed during construction due to miscalculation of weight bearing capacity of a temporary arm.	19 killed, 79 injured	Rebuilt	8 additional deaths during the course of construction
Yesil bridge	Akmola, Kazakh SSR	USSR	14 June 1959	Wooden footbridge	Failure to comply with safety regulations during the construction and operation of the bridge.	6 killed. Akmola's worst disaster.	Bridge destroyed.	According to eyewitnesses, more than 100 people died instead of 6.In 1963, a new concrete bridge was built.
Severn Railway Bridge	Gloucestershire	England	25 October 1960	Cast iron	Two of 22 spans collapsed after two petrol barges collided with a support column in thick fog. A third span collapsed 5 months later.	5 killed	Demolished 1967–1970	The remains of the bridge in 1966
I-29 Big Sioux River Bridge	Sioux City, Iowa	United States	1 April 1962	Plate Girder	Northbound road deck collapsed into Big Sioux River as a result of heavy flooding			Rebuilt and in current use
King Street Bridge	Melbourne, Victoria	Australia	10 July 1962		One span collapsed under the weight of a 47-long-ton (48 t) semi-trailer due to brittle fracture on winter day	0 killed		
Beaver Dam Bridge	approximately 5 kilometres (3.1 mi) southeast of Whitehouse, Quebec	Canada	22 May 1963		Flood damage	6 killed		Several vehicles fell into the York river
General Rafael Urdaneta Bridge	Maracaibo	Venezuela	6 April 1964	Road bridge	Ship collision	7 killed	2 section collapsed	Currently in operation
Lake Pontchartrain Causeway	Metairie, Louisiana	United States	16 June 1964		Ship collision	6 killed	Single span collapse	
Pamban Bridge	Mandapam, Tamil Nadu	India	23 December 1964	Rail Bridge	1964 Rameswaram Cyclone	Train washed away killing 150 people.	Multiple span collapsed.	Currently New Bridge under construction.
Kansas Avenue Bridge	Topeka, Kansas	United States	2 July 1965	Kansas Avenue Melan Bridge for traffic between downtown and North Topeka	Structural deterioration	1 killed	Single span collapse	Suddenly collapsed about 5:30 p.m. on 2 July 1965, killing a Topeka man.
Long Shoal Bridge	Benton County, Missouri	United States	21 September 1965	Swinging suspension road bridge	Faulty design and overload	3 killed	Total collapse	Collapsed after a 10-ton truck crossed the bridge, which had a 5-ton limit. Old bridge remains at bottom of river.
Heron Road Bridge	Ottawa	Canada	10 August 1966	Concrete road bridge	Collapsed during construction due to use of green lumber and lack of diagonal bracing on wooden support forms for concrete pour.	9 killed	Rebuilt.	
Boudewijnsnelweg Bridge	Viersel	Belgium	13 November 1966	Concrete road bridge over Nete Canal (Netekanaal)	Faulty design: foundation of the piers was not deep enough.	2 killed, 17 injured	Rebuilt.	
Heiligenstedten Bascule Bridge	Heiligenstedten	Germany	1966	Road bridge	Ship collision	0 killed	Bridge rebuilt	
Huasco Bridge	Vallenar	Chile	9 May 1967	Road bridge	Unclear	8 killed, 10 injured	Bridge collapsed during initial construction. Construction restarted in 1972; bridge opened in 1977.	
Silver Bridge	Point Pleasant, West Virginia and Gallipolis, Ohio	United States	15 December 1967	Road bridge, chain link suspension	Stress corrosion cracking; nonredundant eyebar design	46 killed, 9 injured	Bridge and 37 vehicles destroyed. Replaced by Silver Memorial Bridge downstream. Memorial for bridge located on 6th and Main Streets and off the trail along the shoreline in Point Pleasant.	The collapsed Silver Bridge, as seen from the Ohio side. It inspired the book Mothman Prophecies and The Mothman Prophecies (film).
Queen Juliana Bridge	Willemstad, Curaçao	Netherlands Antilles	6 November 1967	Portal bridge	Construction support fault. Fell during construction	15 killed	Bridge collapsed at the Punda side	Bridge reconstruction started in 1969 and was completed in 1971
Countess Wear Bridge	Exeter, Devon	England	6 January 1968	Brick Arch bridge	Construction support fault. Scour under raft foundation		Pier 23 collapsed	Bridge repaired and reinforced
Britannia Bridge	Menai Strait	Wales	23 May 1970	Railway tubular bridge	Children accidentally set light to debris and railway sleepers and irreparably damaged the bridge	No casualties	Tubular section buckled beyond repair	Bridge re-built to a new design using the original piers with a road deck over the new railway deck
West Gate Bridge	Melbourne, Victoria	Australia	15 October 1970	Road bridge	Collapsed during construction due to poor design and ill-advised construction methods	35 killed	112-metre (367 ft) span between piers 10 and 11 collapsed	Cantilevered section under construction sprang back and collapsed following attempts to remove a buckle caused by a difference in camber of 11 cm (4.5 inches) between it and the other section of the span to which it was to be joined
Cleddau Bridge	Pembroke Dock and Neyland	Wales	2 June 1970	Box girder road bridge	Inadequacy of the design of a pier support diaphragm	4 killed, 5 injured		70-metre (230 ft) cantilever being used to put one of the 150-tonne (150-long-ton) sections into position collapsed
South Bridge, Koblenz	Koblenz	Germany	10 November 1971	Road bridge	Bridge bent into Rhine	13 killed, unknown injured	Bridge completely destroyed	
Charles III Bridge	Molins de Rei	Spain	6 December 1971	Stone road bridge	Flood damage	1 killed	2 arches collapsed, a lorry fell into the Llobregat	Prior to the accident, dredging of the riverbed to mine sand had weakened pier foundations. The bridge was finally blown up and a new one built in its place.
Fiskebækbroen	Farum	Denmark	8 February 1972	Two separate highway bridges of the E45 highway	Western bridge collapsed during construction as concrete for foundation was not adequately compressed.	None injured	Bridge rebuilt	The involved construction company C.T. Winkel, subsequently went bankrupt.
1972 Sidney Lanier Bridge collapse	Brunswick, Georgia	United States	7 November 1972	Vertical Lift Bridge over the South Brunswick River	Struck by the freighter African Neptune	10 deaths, multiple injuries	Several spans knocked out	Repaired during 1972–73 then completely replaced with a new cable-stayed bridge in 2003
Bulls Bridge	Bulls	New Zealand	15 June 1973		Flood damage	1 injured	3 spans collapsed	A Bailey Bridge was in place over the gap within 6 weeks and a full replacement of the three spans was opened in December 1973.
West Side Elevated Highway	New York City	United States	15 December 1973		Poor maintenance and overloading	No casualties	Single span collapse, which caused the closure and eventual demolition of most of the highway.	Collapsed span of the elevated highway
Welland Canal Bridge No. 12	Port Robinson, Ontario	Canada	25 August 1974	Vertical lift bridge over the Welland Canal	Struck by the ore carrier Steelton	0 killed, 2 injured	Bridge declared a loss; new tunnel or bridge rebuilding costs were found to be unjustified.	Remaining structure dismantled; passenger ferry instated. Car traffic must use the northern Allanburg bridge or the southern East Main Street tunnel in Welland. Port Robinson Ferry is a passenger service that crosses from the site of the former bridge from July to October (weather permitting).
Makahali River bridge	Baitadi	Nepal	November 1974			140 killed		
Tasman Bridge	Hobart, Tasmania	Australia	5 January 1975	Bridge of concrete, Motorway bridge	Ore freighter Lake Illawarra collided with pylons. A 400-foot (120 m) section of bridge collapsed onto freighter and into the river. Four cars drove off bridge.	12 killed (7 ship crewman and 5 motorists)	2 pylons and three sections of bridge collapsed, ore freighter sank, 4 cars fell into river	City of Hobart was split in two. Residents living in the east were forced to make a 50 kilometres (31 mi) trip to the CBD via the next bridge to the north. Missing sections were reconstructed and the bridge reopened on 8 October 1977. The Bowen Bridge was later constructed, 10 km (6 mi) to the north, to reduce the impact of any future failure of the Tasman Bridge.
Reichsbrücke	Vienna	Austria	1 August 1976	Road bridge with tram	Column fractured	1 killed, 0 injured	Bridge, one bus and a lorry destroyed, ships damaged	Sightseers after the collapse in 1976. Concrete of the column had never been examined, was internally totally destroyed; "higher force"
Granville Railway Bridge	Sydney, New South Wales	Australia	18 January 1977	Vehicle overpass	Passenger train derailed while passing under the Bold Street road overpass and collided with a support pier. Section of bridge collapsed onto train cars.	83 (including an unborn child) killed, 210 injured	Bridge destroyed, later replaced	The bridge was supported by two piers situated between the various rail tracks. Part of the derailed train virtually demolished the northern pier, resulting in the collapse of the northernmost span of the bridge. It was replaced by a single-span bridge.
Benjamin Harrison Memorial Bridge	Hopewell, Virginia	United States	24 February 1977	Lift bridge	An ocean-going tanker ship, the 5,700 ton, 523-ft long Marine Floridian struck the bridge, collapsing a section.	0 killed, minor injuries	Section of bridge destroyed	Bridge repaired
Green Island Bridge	Troy, New York	United States	15 March 1977	Lift bridge	Flooding undermined the lift span pier resulting in the western lift tower and roadbed span of the bridge collapsing into the Hudson River.	0 killed, 0 injured	Bridge destroyed	
Floating bridge over Beloslav Canal (connecting Lake Beloslav and Lake Varna)	Beloslav, Varna Province	Bulgaria	7 November 1978	Floating bridge	Overload by spectators	65 killed	Bridge completely destroyed	
Hood Canal Floating Bridge (William A. Bugge Bridge)	North End of Hood Canal, Washington	United States	13 February 1979	Floating bridge	Blown pontoon hatches combined with extreme windstorm	0 killed, 0 injured	Western drawspan and western pontoons sunk; other sections survived.	Lost portions rebuilt 1979–1982; the remainder of the bridge has since been replaced.
Almöbron (Tjörnbron)	Stenungsund	Sweden	18 January 1980	Steel arch bridge	Ship collision during bad visibility (mist)	8 killed, unknown injured	Bridge and several cars destroyed	The collapsed bridge and MS Star Clipper
Sunshine Skyway Bridge	near St. Petersburg, Florida	United States	9 May 1980	Steel cantilever bridge	The freighter Summit Venture struck the bridge during a storm, causing the center section of the southbound span to collapse into Tampa Bay	35 killed, 1 injured	1,200 feet (370 m) of southbound span, several cars and a bus destroyed	A vehicle stopped just short of the collapsed portion of the bridge. The old bridge has since been turned into a state-run fishing pier and was replaced for traffic with cable-stayed bridge.
Tompkins Hill Road overpass	Humboldt County, California	United States	8 November 1980	Reinforced concrete spans on concrete support columns	Earthquake caused two spans to slip off supporting columns	0 killed, 6 injured	Two vehicles drove into the opening left by collapsed span	Steel cables added to anchor replacement spans to support columns
Hyatt Regency walkway collapse	Kansas City, Missouri	United States	17 July 1981	Double-deck suspended footbridge in hotel interior	Erroneous redesign of supporting member during construction when original design considered too difficult to construct	114 killed, 200 injured	Walkway destroyed	View of the lobby floor, showing remains of the pedestrian bridge
Cline Avenue over the Indiana Harbor and Ship Canal and surrounding heavy industry	East Chicago, Indiana	United States	15 April 1982	Indiana State Route 912	1,200 feet (370 m) of the bridge collapsed during construction when a concrete pad supporting shoring towers developed cracks.	14 killed, 16 injured	Bridge rebuilt	Section between US 12 and the Indiana Toll Road renamed Highway Construction Workers Memorial Highway
Puente de Brenes	Brenes, Sevilla	Spain	12 Aug 1982	Carretera Brenes-Villaverde del Rio	Structural failure due to inadequate design	No casualties	The bridge collapsed during the night	
Ulyanovsk railway bridge	Ulyanovsk	USSR	5 June 1983	Railway bridge	Ship collision	177 killed, unknown injured	No collapse	The span cut the deck house and the cinema hall, whilst the lowest deck was undamaged. The ship damaged the railway bridge and some freight cars from the train fell onto the ship.
Mianus River Bridge	Greenwich, Connecticut	United States	28 June 1983	Interstate 95 (Connecticut Turnpike) over the Mianus River	Metal corrosion and fatigue/Deferred maintenance	3 killed, 3 injured	100-foot (30 m) section of the northbound lanes fell into the Mianus River	Collapse due to failure of the pin and hanger assembly supporting the span. Temporary span installed to re-open I-95; new Mianus River Bridge completed in 1990.
Puente Colgante de Santa Fe	Santa Fe	Argentina	28 September 1983	Suspension Bridge	Flooding	0 killed, 0 injured	Total collapse	Almost total collapse of the bridge due to historical flooding. It was reconstructed equal to its original design of 1928 in the year 2002.
Cuscatlán Bridge	San Ildefonso	El Salvador	1 January 1984	Suspension bridge	Bombing	Several killed	Total collapse	The bridge was bombed by the Farabundo Martí National Liberation Front during the Salvadoran Civil War. A new bridge was built just south of the Cuscatlán Bridge in 1998.
U.S. Highway 36, the Boulder Turnpike, near MP 12.5	Westminster, Colorado	United States	2 August 1985	Concrete bed with steel girders on concrete support posts	Head-on Train Collision	5 killed	Northbound span collapsed in accident; southbound span collapsed during cleanup efforts. Within days, crews built a temporary road around the scene of the accident and erected a stoplight at the tracks, and the bridge was eventually rebuilt.	1986 train collision wreckage and U.S.36 bridge collapse near Westminster, Colorado, USA. According to a National Transportation Safety Board report, two Burlington Northern trains collided head-on beneath a U.S. 36 overpass in Westminster, Colorado. The bridge was destroyed by derailed cars which struck structural support members, and by fire which erupted following the collision.
Stebbins Rd. Bridge (NY State Rt 90, not to be confused with Interstate 90)	Hanover, NY	United States	15 November 1986	One lane steel bridge	Likely overloaded	1 killed, 3 injured	Total loss	Collapse likely due to overloading. The bridge, with a posted 8-ton limit, was crossed by a construction crane.
Amarube railroad bridge	Kasumi, Hyōgo	Japan	28 December 1986		Strong wind	6 killed (one train conductor and five factory workers)	An out-of-service train fell onto a fish processing factory	
Schoharie Creek Bridge collapse Thruway Bridge	Fort Hunter, New York	United States	5 April 1987	I-90 New York Thruway over the Schoharie Creek	Improper protection of footings by contractor led to scour of riverbed under footings.	10 killed, unknown injured	Total collapse	
Schoharie Creek's Mill Point Bridge	Wellsville, Amsterdam, New York	United States	11 April 1987	NY 161 over the Schoharie Creek	Flooding	0 killed, 0 injured	Total collapse	The Mill Point Bridge is 3 miles (4.8 km) upstream from the Thruway bridge that collapsed on 5 April. Flood waters from the same flood that finally undermined the Thruway bridge were up to the girders of the Mill Point bridge. It was closed as a safety precaution. It collapsed six days after the earlier collapse.
Glanrhyd Bridge	Carmarthen	Wales	19 October 1987	River Tywi	Train washed off railway bridge by flood waters	4 killed		
Sultan Abdul Halim ferry terminal bridge	Butterworth, Penang	Malaysia	31 July 1988			More than 32 killed.		
Ness Viaduct	Inverness	Scotland	7 February 1989	Railway bridge carrying the Far North Line over the River Ness	Bridge foundations overwhelmed by floodwaters due to low tide in Beauly Firth causing waterfall effect	0 killed, 0 injured	Near total collapse, remains demolished and rebuilt in 1990	Bridge confirmed to be structurally sound in 1987 and 1988 checks
Tennessee Hatchie River Bridge	Between Covington, Tennessee and Henning, Tennessee	United States	1 April 1989	Northbound lanes of U.S. 51 over the Hatchie River	Shifting river channel, deterioration of foundation timber piles	8 killed	Total collapse	NTSB faulted Tennessee for not fixing the bridge before the collapse
Cypress Street Viaduct	Oakland, California	United States	17 October 1989	I-880 (Nimitz Freeway)	Destroyed in Loma Prieta earthquake	42 killed	Structure destroyed, remains demolished and removed. The ground-level Cypress Street is now Mandela Parkway.	The collapsed Cypress Street Viaduct seen from ground-level. Note detachment of upper vertical elements from lower and the lack of reinforcement at the point of detachment. Replacement route for I-880 built around West Oakland.
San Francisco–Oakland Bay Bridge	connects San Francisco and Oakland, California	United States	17 October 1989	I-80	50-foot (15 m) section of the upper deck and lower deck collapsed in Loma Prieta earthquake	1 killed		Collapsed section of roadway deck Reopened on 18 November of that year. Replaced with a self-anchored suspension bridge and approach spans in 2013.
Swinging Bridge	Heber Springs, Arkansas	United States	28 October 1989	Pedestrian suspension bridge over the Little Red River; 1912 erected but 1972 closed for cars; 1985 placed in National Register of Historic Places	Destroyed by pedestrians swinging the bridge	at least 5 killed	Structure collapsed	
Lacey V. Murrow Memorial Bridge	Connects Seattle and Mercer Island, Washington	United States	25 November 1990	I-90	Heavy flooding of pontoons	0 killed 0 injured	2,790 feet (850 m) of the bridge sank, dumping the contaminated water into the lake along with tons of bridge material	
Astram Line steel bridge	Hiroshima	Japan	14 March 1991	Metro railway	While in construction, 43-ton steel fell to the road below.	15 killed (5 workers and 10 civilians), 8 injured		
Santa Monica Freeway at La Cienega Boulevard	Mid City, Los Angeles	United States	17 Jan 1994		1994 Northridge Earthquake			
Newhall Pass Interchange	Newhall, Santa Clarita, California	United States	17 Jan 1994		1994 Northridge Earthquake	1 killed		Rebuilt interchange named Clarence Wayne Dean Memorial Interchange in honor of the police officer who died falling off the collapsed bridge
Claiborne Avenue Bridge	9th Ward, New Orleans, Louisiana	United States	28 May 1993	Bridge connecting the "upper" and "lower" 9th Wards	Barge collision	1 killed, 2 injured		Empty barge collided with a support pier for the bridge, causing a 145-foot (44 m) section to collapse
Kapellbrücke (Chapel Bridge)	Lucerne	Switzerland	18 August 1993	The oldest wooden bridge in Europe, and one of Switzerland's main tourist attractions.	It is believed that a cigarette started a fire in the evening.	0 killed, unknown injured		78 of 111 of the famous paintings were destroyed and the bridge burned nearly completely down. The bridge was rebuilt to match the original.
CSXT Big Bayou Canot rail bridge	near Mobile, Alabama	United States	22 September 1993	Railroad bridge span crossing Big Bayou Canot of Mobile River	Barge towboat, struck pier in fog; span shifted so next train derailed; impact of derailment destroyed span	47 killed, 103 injured	Amtrak train Sunset Limited carrying 220 passengers plunged into water	Bridge span had been made movable in case a swing bridge was wanted, and never properly fastened
Temporary bridge	Hopkinton, New Hampshire	United States	24 November 1993	Single-lane temporary bridge in construction zone	Collapsed while being dismantled	2 construction workers killed, 1 injured	Collapsed onto roadway below	Bridge had been placed to divert traffic from resurfacing project on U.S. Route 202
Seongsu Bridge disaster	Seoul	South Korea	21 October 1994	Cantilever bridge crossing Han River	Structural failure due to bad welding	32 killed, 17 injured	48-metre (157 ft) slab between the fifth and the sixth piers collapsed	Structural failure was caused by improper welding of the steel trusses of the suspension structure beneath the concrete slab roadway.
Kobe Route of the Hanshin Expressway	Kobe, Japan	Japan	17 January 1995	Elevated highway	Earthquake - support piers failed	0 killed. 0 injured	Section collapsed on the Hanshin Expressway.	Overpass collapsed following the 6.9 M_{w} Great Hanshin earthquake.
I-5 Bridge Disaster	Coalinga, California	United States	10 March 1995	Concrete truss bridge Arroyo Pasajero	Structural failure — support piers collapsed	7 killed, 0 injured	Complete failure of two spans on I-5	Due to extreme rainfall, the Arroyo Pasajero experienced high volumes of water at high speed. This caused scouring of the river bed undermining the support piers of both spans.
Elhovo bridge over the Tundzha river	Elhovo, Yambol Province	Bulgaria	6 January 1996	Suspension bridge	Over 100 spectators crowded one side of the bridge to observe the throwing of the cross (an Epiphany tradition) into the river when one suspension chain snapped and dozens fell in the icy river.	9 killed	Suspension chain snapped due to overload.	
Walnut Street Bridge	Harrisburg, Pennsylvania	United States	January 1996	Truss bridge	Rising flood waters and ice floes from the North American blizzard of 1996 lifted the spans off their foundations and swept them down the river.	0 killed, 0 injured	Lost two of its seven western spans, A third span was damaged and later collapsed into the river.	Western span of the Walnut Street Bridge after it collapsed during the 1996 flood. The eastern span is still in use for pedestrian traffic.
Koror-Babeldaob Bridge	Koror and Babeldaob	Palau	26 September 1996		Collapse following strengthening work	2 killed, 4 injured		
Maccabiah bridge collapse	Tel Aviv/Ramat Gan border	Israel	14 July 1997	Athletes pedestrian bridge	Poor design and construction	4 killed (2 killed in collapse, 2 others indirectly), 60 injured		During opening of the 15th Maccabiah Games, a temporary bridge over the polluted Yarkon River collapsed causing two deaths the same day and infected many with the deadly fungus Pseudallescheria boydii, from which 2 more died later.
Eschede train disaster	Eschede	Germany	3 June 1998	Road bridge	Train disaster	101 killed, 105 injured		After derailing due to metal fatigue in one of its metal tyres, the Hanover-bound InterCityExpress high speed train collided with a road bridge, causing it to collapse onto part of the train. 99 people on board the train, as well as two engineers who were working near the track at the time of the accident, were killed.
Injaka Bridge Collapse	Bushbuckridge, Mpumalanga	South Africa	6 July 1998	300m 7-span continuous pre-stressed concrete road bridge over the Injaka Dam under construction.	Design faults and negligence.	14 killed, 19 injured	Structure destroyed. Rebuilt completed in 2000, now carrying the R533 over the Injaka Dam (Reservoir).	Collapsed while being inspected. Victims include design and consulting engineers.
Qijiang Rainbow Bridge Collapse	Qijiang, Chongqing	People's Republic of China	4 Jan 1999	Pedestrian arch bridge	Shoddy materials and workmanship due to corrupt officials	At least 40 killed, 14 injured	Total destruction	Collapsed 3 years after construction was finished in 1996. Multiple people involved with the bridge's construction were arrested and tried, with at least one sentenced to death. The bridge was rebuilt in 2000.
Maiden Choice Footbridge	Arbutus, Baltimore County, Maryland	United States	8 June 1999	Pre-stressed concrete pedestrian footbridge	Collision with overheight road vehicle.	1 killed, 6 injured	The entire footbridge, the surviving span and the fallen span, were demolished overnight and removed by the next morning.	Collapsed after being struck by an over-height and improperly secured load on a flatbed tractor-trailer. The entire structure - which was built in 1957 - had been closed for two years.

== 2000–2020 ==
Bridge	Location	Country	Date	Construction type, use of bridge	Reason	Casualties	Damage	Comments
Charlotte Motor Speedway pedestrian bridge over U.S. Route 29	Charlotte, North Carolina	United States	20 May 2000	Concrete pedestrian bridge	Beam weakness and other unspecified reasons.	0 killed, 107 injured	Partial collapse	Collapsed after the 2000 NASCAR All-Star Race while full of pedestrians leaving the event. The bridge fell onto U.S. Route 29.
New Magarola Bridge	Esparreguera	Spain	10 June 2000	Concrete road bridge		2 killed	Partial collapse	Two spans collapsed due to flooding, and a car fell to the river. The damaged bridge was demolished and replaced by a new one.
Boulevard du Souvenir overpass collapse	Laval, Quebec	Canada	18 June 2000	Steel beams and concrete	Beam weakness and other unspecified reasons.	1 killed, 2 injured	Total collapse	Collapsed onto the road below, killing 1 person and injuring 2 others. Remainder was demolished after the collapse by authorities for safety reasons.
Chagres River	Gamboa	Panama	23 June 2000			0 killed, 0 injured		Bulk carrier "Bluebill" hit railway bridge crossing river, severely damaging the bridge and severing railway midway between the terminals.
Hoan Bridge	Milwaukee, Wisconsin	United States	13 December 2000	Concrete and steel bridge	Northbound right lane began to buckle during the morning rush hour and sagged a few feet from violent failure of cross bracing members caused by extremely high stress concentrations in triaxial welds.	0 killed, 0 injured	Partial collapse	Damaged section removed by controlled demolition and rebuilt. Remainder of bridge extensively repaired and retrofitted. Triaxial welds were drilled and most cross bracing members were removed. Many other similar bridges around the world were also modified in this way as a result of this failure.
Hintze Ribeiro Bridge	Entre-os-Rios, Castelo de Paiva	Portugal	4 March 2001	Masonry and steel bridge built in 1887	Pillar foundation became compromised due to years of illegal, but permitted sand extraction and the central span collapsed.	59 killed	Collapse of central sections	Bridge collapsed when a bus was passing in stormy weather with fast river flow. Three cars also fell in the collapsed section. Bridge demolished and replaced by modern bridge.
I-285 bridge over GA-400	Atlanta, Georgia	United States	9 June 2001	Concrete and steel bridge	A fuel tanker overturned underneath the bridge, engulfing the bridge in fire	0 killed, 1 injured	Structural damage required closure of the bridge	Reopened after four week repair
Kadalundi River rail bridge	Kadalundi	India	21 June 2001	140-year-old rail bridge		59 killed, 200 injured		Collapsed as a Mangalore Mail passenger train was crossing it, six carriages derailed and three went into the river
Queen Isabella Causeway	Port Isabel, Texas and South Padre Island, Texas	United States	15 September 2001	Concrete bridge for vehicle traffic over Laguna Madre	4 loaded barges veered 175 feet (53 m) west of the navigation channel and struck one of the bridge supports, causing a partial collapse of 3 sections measuring approximately 80 feet (24 m) each.	8 killed, 13 survivors	Partial collapse	The damaged section of the Queen Isabella Causeway. The collapse had a significant economic impact on the region since the Causeway is the only road connecting South Padre Island to Port Isabel. The bridge also carried electricity lines and fresh water to the island. State officials brought in ferries to temporarily carry cars across the Laguna Madre. Repair cost for the bridge was estimated US$5 million.
I-40 bridge disaster	Webbers Falls, Oklahoma	United States	26 May 2002	Concrete bridge for vehicle traffic over Arkansas River	Barge struck one pier of the bridge causing a partial collapse	14 killed, 11 injured	Partial collapse	I-40 Bridge, May 31, 2002. Bridge was later repaired.
Rafiganj rail bridge	Rafiganj	India	10 September 2002		Possible terrorist sabotage resulting in a train derailment	130+ killed, 150+ injured		Fifteen train cars derailed when a bridge over the Dhave River collapsed, with two cars and an unknown number of people falling into the river. 130 bodies were recovered, but the full death toll is unknown.
Chubut River Bridge disaster	Chubut River, Chubut Province	Argentina	19 September 2002	Pedestrian suspension bridge	Excess weight due to passers-by	9 killed, + 5 injured	Total collapse	Collapse of the pedestrian suspension bridge when more than 50 students and teachers of a school who were running in the area crossed it when the capacity of the bridge support was maximum of three people.
Marcy Pedestrian Bridge Collapse	Marcy, New York	United States	11 October 2002	Pedestrian bridge under construction	While closed for construction, bridge twisted and collapsed over State Route 49.	1 killed, 9 injured	Total collapse	Bridge collapsed as workers were screeding a concrete surface on the bridge. The machine had made it to the bridge's midspan before the entire bridge twisted and collapsed. Workers who had been working on the bridge had described it being notably "bouncy" leading up to the collapse.
Sgt. Aubrey Cosens VC Memorial Bridge	Latchford, Ontario,	Canada	14 January 2003		Partial failure under load of transport truck during severely cold temperatures. Fatigue fractures of three steel hanger rods cited as primary reason for failure.	0 killed, 0 injured	Partial failure of bridge deck. Overhead superstructure undamaged.	Bridge reopened after complete reconstruction. Existing overhead arch remained, however new bridge deck was designed to be supported by sets of 4 hanger cables, where the existing deck was designed for single hanger cables.
Kinzua Bridge	Kinzua Bridge State Park, Pennsylvania	United States	21 July 2003	Historic steel rail viaduct	Hit by tornado	0 killed	Partial collapse	The state decided not to rebuild the Kinzua Bridge.
Interstate 95 Howard Avenue Overpass	Bridgeport, Connecticut	United States	26 March 2004	Girder and floorbeam	Car struck a truck carrying heating oil, igniting a fire that melted the superstructure, causing collapse of the southbound lanes	0 killed, 1 injured	Partial collapse	Northbound lanes shored up with falsework and reopened 3 days later; temporary bridge installed to carry southbound lanes. New permanent bridge completed in November 2004.
Big Nickel Road Bridge	Sudbury, Ontario	Canada	7 May 2004			0 killed	Collapsed onto roadway below during construction	
C-470 overpass over I-70	Golden, Colorado	United States	15 May 2004		During construction, a girder twisted, sagged, and fell onto I-70. An eastbound SUV struck the fallen girder; the top of the vehicle was torn off and three passengers died instantly.	3 killed, 0 injured	Girder collapse	
Mungo Bridge		Cameroon	1 July 2004	Steel girder for road traffic			Partial collapse	Yet to be repaired
Loncomilla Bridge	near San Javier	Chile	18 November 2004	Concrete bridge for vehicle traffic over Maule River	The structure was not built on rock, but rather on fluvial ground.	0 killed, 8 injured	Partial collapse	Bridge was later repaired
I-10 Twin Span Bridge	New Orleans and Slidell, Louisiana	United States	29 August 2005	Two parallel trestle bridges crossing the eastern end of Lake Pontchartrain	After Hurricane Katrina on August 29, 2005, the old Twin Spans suffered extensive damage, as the rising storm surge had pulled or shifted bridge segments off their piers.	0 killed, 0 injured	The eastbound span was missing 38 segments with another 170 misaligned, while the westbound span was missing 26 segments with 265 misaligned.	Bridge was reconstructed but later replaced with two new spans due to vulnerability to storm surges.
Biloxi Bay Bridge	Biloxi, Mississippi	United States	29 August 2005	Two parallel trestle bridges crossing the eastern end of the Biloxi Bay	After Hurricane Katrina on August 29, 2005, the original U.S. Route 90 crossing over the Biloxi Bay suffered extensive damage, as the rising storm surge shifted bridge segments off their piers.	0 killed, 0 injured		Bridge was replaced in 2007 with a new design aimed to withstand hurricane-force winds and flooding.
Veligonda Railway Bridge		India	29 October 2005	Railway bridge	flood washed rail bridge away	114 killed		
Almuñécar motorway bridge	Almuñécar, province of Granada	Spain	7 November 2005	Motorway bridge	Part collapsed during construction, reason unknown	6 killed, 3 injured	Partial collapse during construction; all the victims were workers.	A 60-metre (200 ft) long part fell 50 metres (160 ft)
Caracas-La Guaira highway, Viaduct #1	Tacagua	Venezuela	19 March 2006	Highway viaduct over a gorge	Landslides	0 killed, 0 injured	Total collapse	Demolished, it was rebuilt and reopened on 21 June 2007
E45 Bridge	Nørresundby	Denmark	25 April 2006	Road bridge	Collapsed during reconstruction due to miscalculation	1 killed	Bridge total damage	The road under the bridge were partially reopened 3 days later. The bridge was reconstructed (again) and opened 18 months later
Interstate 88 Bridge	Unadilla, New York	United States	28 June 2006	Road bridge	Collapsed during Mid-Atlantic United States flood of 2006	2 killed	Bridge total damage	NYSDOT started construction to replace the section of highway almost immediately, and it was re-opened 31 August 2006.
Yekaterinburg bridge collapse	Yekaterinburg	Russia	6 September 2006		Collapse during construction	0 killed, 0 injured		
Highway 19 overpass at Laval (De la Concorde Overpass collapse)	Laval, Quebec	Canada	30 September 2006	Highway overpass	Shear failure due to incorrectly placed rebar, low-quality concrete	5 killed, 6 injured	20-metre (66 ft) section gave way	Demolished; was rebuilt, reopened on 13 June 2007.
Nimule	Nimule	Kenya/Sudan	October 2006		Struck by truck overloaded with cement			
Pedestrian bridge	Bhagalpur	India	December 2006		150-year-old pedestrian bridge (being dismantled) collapsed onto a railway train as it was passing underneath.	More than 30 killed		
Run Pathani Bridge Collapse	80 km (50 miles) east of Karachi,	Pakistan	2006		Collapsed during the 2006 monsoons			
Railway bridge	Eziama, near Aba	Nigeria	December 2006		Unknown	Unknown killed	Restored 2009	
	Southeastern Guinea	Guinea	March 2007		Bridge collapsed under the weight of a truck packed with passengers and merchandise.	65 killed		
		South Korea	5 April 2007		Parts of a bridge collapses during construction	5 killed, 7 injured		Bridge being built between the two Southern Islands.
MacArthur Maze	Oakland, California	United States	29 April 2007		Tanker truck crash and explosion, resulting fire softened steel sections of flyover causing them to collapse.	1 injured in crash, 0 from collapse		Span rebuilt in 26 days.
Highway 325 Bridge over the Xijiang River	Foshan, Guangdong	People's Republic of China	15 June 2007	Motorway bridge	Struck by vessel	8 killed, unknown injured	Section collapsed	Unknown
Gosford Culvert washaway	Gosford, New South Wales	Australia	8 June 2007		Culvert collapse	5 killed (all drowned)		
Minneapolis I-35W bridge over the Mississippi River	Minneapolis, Minnesota	United States	1 August 2007	Arch/truss bridge	The NTSB said that undersized gusset plates, increased concrete surfacing load, and weight of construction supplies/equipment caused this collapse.	13 killed, 145 injured	Total bridge failure	Security camera images show the collapse in animation, looking north. Collapsed at 6:05 pm beneath bumper-to-bumper rush hour traffic confined to 4 of 8 lanes due to resurfacing in progress. The rebuilt I-35W Saint Anthony Falls Bridge was reopened on 18 September 2008.
Tuo River bridge	Fenghuang, Hunan	People's Republic of China	13 August 2007	Unknown	Believed linked to local contractors' use of shoddy materials to cut costs and migrant laborers with little safety training. Exact cause remains unknown.	34 killed, 22 injured	Total collapse	Collapsed during construction as workers were removing scaffolding from its facade
Harp Road bridge	Oakville, Washington	United States	15 August 2007	Main thoroughfare into Oakville over Garrard Creek, Grays Harbor County	Collapsed under weight of a truck hauling an excavator	0 killed, 0 injured	Majority to total collapse; temporary or permanent bridge is needed.	Approximate weight of load was 180,000 pounds (82,000 kg); bridge is rated at 35,000 pounds (16,000 kg). Residents must take a 23-mile (37 km) detour.
Water bridge	Taiyuan, Shanxi province	People's Republic of China	16 August 2007		180t vehicle overloaded bridge designed for 20t	unknown	Total collapse of 1 span of 2	
Shershah Bridge – Section of the Northern Bypass, Karachi	Karachi	Pakistan	1 September 2007	Overpass bridge	Investigation underway	5 killed, 2 injured		Collapse may have been caused because of lack of material strength. The reconstruction is in progress.
Flyover bridge	Punjagutta, Hyderabad, Andhra Pradesh	India	9 September 2007		During construction	15–30 killed		
Cần Thơ Bridge	Cần Thơ	Vietnam	26 September 2007		Collapse of a temporary pillar due to the sandy foundation it was set on.	55 killed, hundreds injured	Section buckled while construction was underway	Pieces of Cần Thơ Bridge remaining after its collapse on 4 October 2007, ten days after the accident. A preliminary investigation discovered that the engineers had underspecified the loading capacity of the scaffolding in several ways, but ultimately it was determined that the unevenly settling foundation was the primary cause of the collapse.
Chhinchu suspension bridge	Nepalgunj, Birendranagar	Nepal	25 December 2007		Overcrowded suspension bridge collapsed	19 killed, 15 missing		
Jintang Bridge	Ningbo, Zhejiang province	People's Republic of China	27 March 2008		Ship hit lower support structure of bridge	4 killed, 0 Injured	60m span of under-construction bridge collapsed	
The Cedar Rapids and Iowa City Railway (CRANDIC) bridge	Cedar Rapids, Iowa	United States	12 June 2008	Railroad bridge	During June 2008 Midwest floods	0 killed, 0 injured	Three of the bridge's four steel spans were swept into the river along with 15 CRANDIC rail cars loaded with rock	The Cedar River was still swollen in this image taken 10 days after the bridge's collapse.
Road bridge	Studénka	Czech Republic	8 August 2008		Train crashed into a road bridge over the railway under construction, which collapsed on the track immediately before the arrival of a train	8 killed, 70 injured		2008 Studénka train wreck
Somerton Bridge	Somerton, New South Wales	Australia	8 December 2008	Timber road bridge	Heavy flooding	None	Collapse of northern span	Bridge collapsed during heavy flooding due to poor maintenance
Devonshire Street pedestrian bridge	Maitland, New South Wales	Australia	5 March 2009	Footbridge	Oversized truck clipping main span	0 killed, 4 injured (Car & Truck Drivers)	Main span falling on New England Highway, road closed for 4 days	Replaced by taller Footbridge 18 months later
Popp's Ferry Bridge	Biloxi, Mississippi	United States	20 March 2009	Bascule bridge crossing Back Bay Biloxi	A tugboat pushing eight barges hit the bridge pilings	0 killed, 0 injured	Two ninety-foot sections of the bridge dropped into the water	The bridge reopened to traffic on April 25, 2009
Bridge on SS9 over River Po	Piacenza	Italy	30 April 2009	Road bridge	Collapsed due to flood of River Po	0 killed, 1 injured		Replaced by a temporary floating bridge 6 months later, then by a definitive new bridge that opened on 18 December 2010
Overpass on Hongqi Road	Zhuzhou, Hunan	People's Republic of China	17 May 2009	Road bridge	Collapsed during demolishing process	9 killed, 16 injured, 24 vehicles damaged		
9 Mile Road Bridge at I-75	Hazel Park, Michigan	United States	15 July 2009	Road bridge	Collapsed due to tanker accident	0 killed, 1 injured		Rebuilt and reopened on 11 December of that year
Broadmeadow Viaduct	Broadmeadow – 13 km (8.1 miles) north of Dublin	Ireland	21 August 2009	Railway bridge		0 killed, 0 injured	One span of viaduct collapsed after tidal scouring of foundations;— first reported by local Sea-scouts.	
Tarcoles Bridge	Orotina	Costa Rica	22 October 2009	Suspension bridge built 1924, 270-foot (82 m) span.	Overload by heavy trucks and dead loads (water pipes).	5 killed, 30 injured	Bridge total damage	
San Francisco – Oakland Bay Bridge	Connects San Francisco and Oakland, California	United States	27 October 2009	I-80	Two tension rods and a crossbeam from a recently installed repair collapsed during the evening commute, causing the bridge to be closed temporarily.	0 killed, 1 injured		During an extended closure as part of the eastern span replacement of the San Francisco Oakland Bay Bridge over the 2009 Labor Day holiday, a critical failure was discovered in an eyebar that would have been significant enough to cause a closure of the bridge. Emergency repairs took 70 hours and were completed on 9 September 2009. This is the repair that failed.
Railway Bridge RDG1 48 over the River Crane near Feltham	Feltham	England	14 November 2009	Brick arch railway bridge built 1848	Undermined by scour from river.	No injuries .	River span beyond repair.	Rebuilt as reinforced concrete.
Northside Bridge, Workington. Navvies Footbridge, Workington. Camerton Footbridge, Camerton. Memorial Gardens footbridge, Cockermouth. Low Lorton Bridge, Little Braithwaite Bridge.	Cumbria	England	21 November 2009	Traditional sandstone bridges.	Very intense rainfall produced extreme river loads that overwhelmed all the bridges.	1 police officer killed	All bridges destroyed or damaged beyond repair	See Barker Crossing.
Kota Chambal Bridge	Kota, Rajasthan	India	25 December 2009	Under-Construction Bridge	Inexperience Official	48 killed, several injured	Total Collapse	
Myllysilta	Turku	Finland	6 March 2010		Bridge bent 143 centimetres (56 in) due to structural failures of both piers	0 killed, 0 injured		Demolished June–July 2010
Gungahlin Drive Extension bridge	Canberra, Australian Capital Territory	Australia	14 August 2010	Concrete road bridge	Unknown	15 workers injured	Collapse of the half-built span	Bridge collapsed during a concrete pour.
Guaiba's Bridge (BR-290)	Porto Alegre, Rio Grande do Sul	Brazil	1 October 2010	Concrete and steel bridge	Braking system (electrical) failure stuck the main span 9 meters above the lane rendering the bridge useless by (at least) 3 hours.	0 killed, 0 injured	Bridge fixed	Damaged probably due to a vessel which collided, bending the main span on April 30, 2008.
Laajasalo pedestrian bridge	Helsinki	Finland	22 November 2010	Steel reinforced concrete	Bridge collapsed on a van and taxi when a personnel lift truck with the lift mistakenly elevated passed under the bridge.	1 killed, 2 injured	Collapsed on the road beneath	Both other cars were driving in the opposite direction. The van driver died and taxi driver and passenger were injured. Bridge now rebuilt.
Overbridge over Chengdu-Kunming Freeway	Zigong	People's Republic of China	1 July 2011		Truck crashed against concrete support pillar		Overbridge destroyed, fell onto highway.	
Gongguan Bridge	Wuyishan, Fujian	People's Republic of China	14 July 2011		Overloading	1 killed, 22 Injured	Total collapse	Entire bridge collapsed, tourist bus with 23 people on board crashed to ground
No. 3 Qiantang River Bridge over Qiantang River	Hangzhou, Zhejiang province	People's Republic of China	15 July 2011		Overloading	0 killed, 1 Injured	Partial collapse leaving a 20-meter-long, 1-meter-wide pit in one lane	Collapse due to two trucks each loaded with over 100 tonnes of goods crossing bridge
Baihe Bridge in Huairou district	Beijing	People's Republic of China	19 July 2011		Bridge designed for max. 46 tonne vehicles, truck overloaded with 160 tons of sand caused it to collapse.	0 killed, 0 Injured	Entire 230m bridge destroyed.	
Kutai Kartanegara Bridge	Tenggarong, East Kalimantan	Indonesia	26 November 2011	Suspension bridge	Human error. As workers repaired a cable during maintenance work, a support cable snapped, causing the roadway to fall into the 50-metre-deep Mahakam River. Poor maintenance, fatigue in the construction material of cable hanger, and the quality of material may have contributed to the collapse, although the exact cause is undetermined.	20 killed, 40 injured (33 missing)	Deck completely destroyed, 2 bridge pillars were standing at the time of the collapse.	Kutai Kartanegara Bridge on the day of the collapse. Replacement arch bridge opened in 2015.
Eggner's Ferry Bridge (1932) over Kentucky Lake (Tennessee River)	Between Trigg County, Kentucky and Marshall County, Kentucky	United States	27 January 2012	Truss bridge	The MV Delta Mariner struck the bottom of a span of the bridge when travelling in the incorrect channel of the river.	0 killed, 0 Injured	Span over the recreational channel of the river collapsed.	Emergency repairs to bridge completed on May 25, 2012. There were preexisting plans before the collapse to replace the bridge with a 4-lane bridge over the river. The new bridge opened in April 2016, and the original bridge was demolished that July.
Limfjord Railway Bridge	Aalborg	Denmark	28 March 2012	steel beam, openable	Ship collision	none	Mechanical damage	All rail traffic cancelled for over a year, no alternative route. Reopened April 29, 2013.
Jay Cooke State Park Swinging Bridge	Carlton, Minnesota	United States	20 June 2012	Pedestrian swinging wooden plank and cable	Raging floodwaters	0 killed, 0 injured	Multiple wooden planks washed away. Cables stayed intact.	Closed for repairs. Reopened November 1, 2013.
Beaver River Trestle Bridge	Alberta	Canada	22 June 2012	wood, concrete, metal trestle.	Three men set the bridge on fire.	none	Bridge badly damaged and closed.	Bridge did not carry rail traffic anymore, and carried pedestrians, part of the Iron Horse Trail. Another small fire was set in 2015. Bridge is being rebuilt.
Guangchang Hedong Bridge	Guangchang County, Fuzhou City, Jiangxi Province	People's Republic of China	8 August 2012	steel, concrete		2 killed, 2 injured		
Yangmingtan Bridge over the Songhua River	Harbin	People's Republic of China	24 August 2012	Suspension bridge	Overloading; usage of unsuitable building material (suspected)	3 killed, 5 injured	100-metre section of a ramp of the eight-lane bridge dropped 100 feet to the ground.	Main bridge reopened on the same day, ramp still defunct.
Tallon Bridge over the Burnett River	Bundaberg, Queensland	Australia	29 January 2013	Concrete road bridge	Flood damage	No injuries reported	Partial collapse of the bridge	
Bridge under construction for road E6 at Lade/Leangen	Trondheim	Norway	8 May 2013		Bridge collapsed under construction	2 killed		
I-5 Skagit River Bridge collapse	Mount Vernon, Washington	United States	23 May 2013	Polygonal Warren through truss bridge	Oversized semi-truck load carrying drilling equipment from Alberta clipped top steel girder causing bridge collapse.	0 killed, 3 injured	One 167 foot span collapsed.	Truss bridges like this one require the top and the bottom to remain equal in strength and solidity. When the truck hit the top girder or girders, this caused the pressure/squeeze system to fail, which made the bridge fold up. The design was outdated; more modern types of truss can better withstand such forces.
Pedestrian bridge over Moanalua Freeway	Honolulu, Hawaii	United States	6 October 2012	Concrete Pedestrian Bridge	A dump truck was towing a trailer carrying a forklift, which impacted the pedestrian bridge over Moanalua Road.	No serious injuries reported and no ambulances sent to the scene		
Scott City roadway bridge collapse	Scott City, Missouri	United States	25 May 2013	Concrete road bridge	A Union Pacific train t-boned a Burlington Northern Santa Fe train outside Scott City, Missouri, at about 2:30 am, which caused numerous rail cars to hit an overpass support pillar, collapsing two bridge sections onto the rail line. Two cars drove onto the collapsed sections, injuring five people. Two train occupants were injured.	7 injured	Two roadway bridge sections collapsed onto the rail line below.	
Wanup train bridge	Sudbury, Ontario	Canada	2 June 2013	Steel bridge	Train trestle over the Wanapitei River near Sudbury, Ontario was struck by derailed railcar	0 killed, 0 injured	Total bridge collapse	CP trains temporarily diverted over CN track. Bridge reconstructed with new pier in 9 days.
CPR Bonnybrook Bridge	Calgary, Alberta	Canada	27 June 2013	Steel railroad bridge	Partial pier collapse due to scouring from flood event of the Bow River	0 killed, 0 injured	Partial bridge collapse	
Acaraguá bridge collapse	Oberá, Misiones	Argentina	12 April 2014	Concrete road bridge	The total collapse of a road bridge over the Acaraguá river, when a passenger bus circulated, caused three dead and thirty wounded.	3 killed, 30 injured	Total bridge collapse	
Cable Bridge Surat	Surat, Gujarat	India	10 June 2014	3-Way Interchange Flyover Bridge, A part of River Bridge; Concrete and steel bridge	Collapsed during construction, Design flaw in curvature section of a span resulted in collapse of a curved span slab during the removal of staging plates.	10 killed, 6 injured	Total collapse of one wing.	Bridge constructed after necessary modification in design.
Belo Horizonte overpass collapse	Belo Horizonte	Brazil	3 July 2014	Steel and concrete bridge Part of improvements for the 2014 FIFA World Cup	Construction error	2 killed, 22 injured	Total bridge collapse	Bridge collapsed while under construction
Motorway bridge collapse during construction	Near Copenhagen	Denmark	27 September 2014	Steel and concrete bridge	Construction error	Workers received mild injuries	Partial bridge collapse	Bridge collapsed during concrete casting, with debris falling onto open motorway below and narrowly missing vehicles, closing major motorway E47 for several days. The remains of the bridge were demolished and a replacement built elsewhere.
Hopple Street Overpass over I-75 Southbound	Cincinnati, Ohio	United States	19 January 2015	Road bridge	Old Northbound Hopple Street offramp totally collapsed onto roadway below during demolition	1 killed, 0 injured	Total bridge collapse	Bridge collapsed prematurely due to a faulty demolition process
Plaka Bridge	Plaka-Raftaneon, Epirus	Greece	1 February 2015	Stone bridge	Flash flood ripped foundations from the riverbanks	0 killed, 0 injured	Central section of the bridge collapsed	
Skjeggestad Bridge	Holmestrand, Vestfold	Norway	2 February 2015	Box girder bridge, Motorway	Partial pier displacement due to a landslide.	0 killed, 0 injured	Partial bridge collapse of Southbound span	The Skjeggestad Bridge after collapse. One pier pushed askew due to landslide in quick clay affected area. Underlying reason to be determined. Northbound span shut down precautionary. Damaged section removed by controlled demolition and rebuilt.
Himera Viaduct	Scillato, Sicily	Italy	10 April 2015	Continuous span girder bridge, Motorway	Partial pier displacement due to a landslide.	0 killed, 0 injured	Partial bridge collapse of Southbound span	
Pennsy Bridge	Ridgway, Pennsylvania	United States	18 June 2015	Cast-in-place concrete rigid frame	Partial collapse during demolition.	0 killed, 3 injured	Partial bridge collapse of north half of span	Structure was longitudinally saw cut, south half of the structure was open to traffic while the north half was in the process of being demolished. North half collapsed with 51-ton excavator on the bridge. Underlying reason to be determined. Northbound span shut down precautionary. After collapse, structure was fully closed and south half was demolished. New structure was built and opened to traffic on 26 October 2015.
I-10 Bridge	Southern California	United States	20 July 2015		Remnants of Hurricane Dolores record breaking rainfall caused abutment displacement due to stream meander, which caused abutment scour.	0 killed, 1 injured	Partial bridge collapse of span	
Bob White Covered Bridge	Patrick County, Virginia	United States	29 September 2015	Covered timber bridge	Destruction due to major flooding	0 killed, 0 injured	Bridge collapsed and washed away during flooding caused by severe rainstorm.	
Grayston Pedestrian and Cycle Bridge	M1 road (Johannesburg)	South Africa	14 October 2015	Single pylon cable stayed concrete bridge	Collapse of temporary works during construction	2 killed, 19 injured	Contractor deviated from General Arrangement Drawing provided by equipment supplier.	
Friesenbrücke		Germany	3 December 2015	bascule bridge	damaged by the cargo ship Emsmoon	0 killed, 0 injured	Central part, the moving section, was destroyed.	Destroyed center part, Image taken on 4 December 2015.
Tadcaster Bridge	North Yorkshire	England	29 December 2015	300 year old Stone Bridge Grade II Listed on 12 July 1985	Partial collapse due to flood damage, also causing substantial gas leak	No injuries as bridge had been closed for two days as a precautionary measure	North East side of bridge collapsed severing connections between the two sides of the town	View of the bridge on the following day
Nipigon River Bridge	Ontario	Canada	10 January 2016	Cable-stayed bridge carrying the Trans-Canada Highway	Bolts holding uplift bearing to main girders of the bridge snapped due to design and construction errors.	No injuries were reported	West side of bridge separated from abutment and rose 60 cm above grade, but not seriously damaging the span	Newly constructed bridge failed after 42 days of use, severing the only road link within Canada between Eastern and Western Canada. A temporary repair was completed the next day by adding weights to depress the span into position.
Perkolo Bridge (sv)	Nord-Fron Municipality (near Sjoa in Sel Municipality)	Norway	17 February 2016	Truss bridge with glued laminated timber	Mathematical error	0 dead, 1 injured	Complete collapse	
Vivekananda Flyover Bridge	Kolkata	India	31 March 2016	Steel girder flyover bridge	Bolts holding a section of the bridge snapped. Reason for bolt failure unknown.	27 killed, 80+ injured	Fly over on Vivekananda Road Kolkata	Collapse of bridge under construction
May Ave. Overpass	Oklahoma City, Oklahoma	United States	19 May 2016	Girder bridge over expressway	An over-sized load hit the bridge, causing a section of the deck to fail	No injuries were reported.	Partial collapse	Driver was found responsible for collapse.
Savitri River Bridge	Maharashtra	India	2 August 2016	Stone arched bridge over a river	Dilapidated condition. About 100 years old.	Two buses and few cars plunged into the flooded river. 28 dead.	Partial collapse	The bridge collapsed in the middle of the night, sending many vehicles plunging into the river. A nearby garage worker heard the noise and went to the bridge to stop cars, preventing further casualties.
Railway bridge	Tolten River	Chile	19 August 2016	Suspension bridge with steel deck truss.	Cause undetermined—happened as a freight train was crossing the bridge	0 killed, 0 injured	Partial collapse	3 spans collapsed into river on 118-year-old bridge
Nzi River Bridge	near Dimbokro	Ivory Coast	6 September 2016	Steel railway bridge	While train crossing	0 injured		One span of 1910 bridge collapsed.
Yellow 'Love' Bridge	Klungkung Regency	Indonesia	16 October 2016	Wooden suspension bridge	Snapped sling due to overloading	9 killed, 30 injured	Whole bridge plunged onto river below	Slings snapped while 70 people were on the bridge during Nyepi celebration in Bali. Authorities stated that the sling cables that snapped could have been caused by overloading. Most witnesses stated that before the collapse, the bridge had swayed and shook for several times.
Lecco overpass	Province of Lecco	Italy	28 October 2016	Concrete girder overpass.	Cause undetermined—happened as 108-tonne truck was crossing the bridge	1 killed, 5 injured	Centre span collapsed onto roadway below	Allegations have been made that the maintenance company, ANAS, had requested that the bridge be closed before the collapse and that the request was denied by Lecco, pending documentation.
Camerano overpass	Province of Ancona	Italy	9 March 2017			2 killed, 3 injured	Centre span collapsed onto roadway below	
Pfeiffer Canyon Bridge	Pfeiffer Big Sur State Park; Big Sur, California	United States	11 March 2017	Concrete bridge	Massive rain and landslide	0 killed	The foundation for one of the two piers was undermined by the landslide causing the pier to slide downhill with the earth around it and fail, and the deck to sag.	Bridge collapse resulted in a 6-hour detour to get from one side of Big Sur to the other side, effectively splitting the community in half. It was replaced with a 310-foot-long span steel bridge that opened to traffic on 13 October 2017.
I-85N, Atlanta	Atlanta, Georgia	United States	30 March 2017	Concrete Overpass	Fire (allegedly arson) involving HDPE pipe and other construction materials stored under bridge critically weakened structure, which collapsed.	0 killed, 0 injured	Investigation pending as to fire cause	Repair work being done on the I-85 bridge
Sanvordem River Bridge	Curchorem, Goa	India	18 May 2017	Portuguese era footbridge made of steel	Dilapidation, bridge was closed for use.	2 killed, 30 missing	Bridge is scheduled for demolition.	The bridge was closed for use, but several people wanted to watch the rescue work of an alleged suicidal.
Sigiri Bridge	Nzoia River, Budalangi, Busia County	Kenya	26 June 2017	Three span bridge with composite steel beam and concrete deck.	Collapsed during construction	0 killed, 3 injured	Unknown	Opinion is casting of decks was incorrectly sequenced.
Bridge No 'B1187 – 1978' on N3 at intersection with M2	Johannesburg	South Africa	9 August 2017	Multi-span reinforced concrete foot bridge.	Collapsed at about 1:14 am on a public holiday	0 killed, 5 injured, 1 with critical injuries	Unknown. No fatalities confirmed.	Median column destructed by impact caused by 18.1 ton roll of coiled steel
Ramat Elhanan Pedestrian Crossing on Highway 4	Highway 4, between Bnei Brak and Giv'at Shmuel	Israel	14 August 2017	concrete pedestrian bridge	about 19:48	1 killed		Vehicle collision.
Provincial road Ksanthi-Iasmos at Kompsatos river crossing	Eastern Macedonia and Thrace district	Greece	10 September 2017	3x simple supported spans of precast prestressed concrete girders, supported on reinforced concrete piers on shallow foundations in river bed.	Probable cause is the time evolving scour and poor inspection. Exact cause remains unknown.	0 injured	One span collapsed and the supporting pier was inclined from the vertical orientation.	Many pictures from the collapse (Greek text) can be found here and a newspaper short report (English text) here
Troja footbridge	Prague	Czech Republic	2 December 2017	simple suspension concrete pedestrian bridge	Probably corrosion or damage of the suspension cables, impossibility of their effective inspection, impact of 2002 flood supposed.	4 injured (2 heavily)	Total collapse.	Diagnostic research in 2007–2009 and 2016 assessed the condition as wrong but not emergency. The last expert opinion was finished three weeks before the collapse. Since 2014, the bridge motion was continuously monitored every 2 minutes. The monitored data from 1:16 pm indicated nothing extraordinary, at 1:18 pm, the bridge was collapsed already. A footbridge from an important Prague park to the Prague Zoo over an arm of the Vltava river also collapsed.
Chirajara Viaduct	Border between Cundinamarca and Meta	Colombia	15 January 2018	Cable-stayed bridge	Design flaw in the transverse tie beam of the diamond pier caused the collapse.	10 construction workers killed, about 6 injured	Total collapse of half bridge. Remaining half later demolished.	Bridge failure investigated by the Mexican company Mexpresa, and American company Modjeski and Masters
Florida International University pedestrian bridge collapse	Sweetwater and University Park, Florida	United States	15 March 2018	Concrete Pedestrian Bridge	Partially constructed concrete truss bridge, a rare design. Main span (174 ft.) prefabricated and moved over busy city street. Faulty design (insufficient rebar for interface shear capacity), lack of redundancy, lack of peer review and oversight all contributed to failure. Work was performed while street was open to traffic.	6 dead, 10 others injured.	Complete collapse onto public street with heavy vehicular traffic	
Pathein – Chaung Thar bridge collapse	Ayeyarwady Region	Myanmar	1 April 2018	Concrete Steel Suspension Bridge	Built 2004, 60-ton specification was reduced to 20 tons, when a six-wheel truck crossed at midnight, 1 am, bridge broke in half. Suspected steel rode. Exact cause remains unknown.	2 people died	Complete collapse into river	
Wooden footbridge	Zamboanga, Philippines	Philippines	27 April 2018	Wooden bridge	Wood decay	0 injured	Partial collapse into water	A pedestrian bridge collapsed on film while a group of politicians and news crew were walking on it. No one was injured
Rail bridge	Budila – Brașov County	Romania	30 June 2018	Concrete bridge	Collapse due to the flood	0 dead, 0 injured	Total bridge collapse	
Cancura Bridge Collapse	Osorno – Region de Los Lagos	Chile	23 June 2018	Concrete bridge	Possible loss of foundation	1 dead, 6 injured	One section directly over the river Rahue collapsed	The bridge was under surveillance and undergoing maintenance work as several problems were reported over the prior year. The Directorate of Hydraulic Works reported only days prior to the accident to the Ministry of Public Works that mitigation measures were needed as riverflow changes were potentially undermining the bridge foundations. Other suspected causes were improperly regulated extraction of sand and stones from the riverbed
Zhejiang bridge collapse	Hangzhou City – Zhejiang	People's Republic of China	28 July 2018			8 dead		
Ponte Morandi motorway bridge collapse	Genoa – Liguria	Italy	14 August 2018	Viaduct incorporating a cable-stayed bridge	Collapsed due to structural failure because of criminal negligence of necessary repairs and maintenance	43 killed	210-metre (690 ft) section of the bridge collapsed	Ponte Morandi after the collapse; the bridge was demolished in June 2019. In July 2026 the chief executive of Autostrade per l’Italia was sentenced to 12 years in jail.
Majerhat Bridge collapse	Kolkata	India	4 September 2018	Major motorable bridge in Kolkata (ashpalt motorway)	Possibly "had become too heavy and needed to shed load"	3 dead, 25 injured	35meter section collapsed with a bus, 5 cars and three two-wheelers on the span.	In mid-2017 experts warned that the bridge was too heavy. "The agency had mentioned that the vibrator index of the bridge was okay.... But it suggested shedding of load from the bridge as the structure beneath was carrying more load than it could bear," said a senior Bengal government official involved with the safety audit.
Bridge Collapse at Siliguri	Phansidewa, Siliguri	India	7 September 2018	Small bridge built over nullah at Mangachh in Darjeeling district	The bridge was in a dilapidated condition	1 hurt		
Palu IV Bridge	Palu	Indonesia	28 September 2018	Double Steel Arch, Roadway	2018 Sulawesi tsunami	0 killed, 0 injured	Complete Collapse of both spans	Bridge demolished in January 2019.
Dale Bend Bridge	Ola, Arkansas	United States	30 January 2019	Truss	Overweight truck			
CST Foot over bridge	Mumbai	India	14 March 2019	Concrete Foot Over bridge	The structural audit has been conducted in an irresponsible and negligent manner.	6 dead, 30 injured	Partial Collapse	
Ponte sobre o rio Moju, Bridge over the river Moju collapse	Moju, State of Pará	Brazil	7 April 2019	Concrete	Middle sections of the bridge collapsed after ferryboat crash	Unknown	200 metres (660 ft) section of the bridge collapsed	
Bishopsford Road Bridge	Mitcham, London	England	14 June 2019	Road bridge	Bridge scour caused by jack posts installed 4 days earlier caused instability and led to the partial collapse of the northern arch	0 dead, 0 injured (the bridge was closed to traffic at the time)	Partial collapse (northern arch)	Fully demolished in July 2020 and rebuilt. Rebuilt bridge opened to traffic in October 2021.
Nanfang'ao Bridge	Su'ao, Yilan County	Republic of China	1 October 2019	Road bridge	Corrosion and poor maintenance	6 dead, 12 injured	Total collapse	Bridge collapsed due to corrosion, lack of proper maintenance and lack of repair, according to a final investigation report released by the Taiwan Transportation Safety Board in November 2020.
Wuxi National Route 312 Overpass	Wuxi, Jiangsu Province	People's Republic of China	10 October 2019	Concrete highway bridge	overweight (186t) truck	3 dead, 2 injured	200 metres (660 ft) section of the elevated road toppled	
Pont de Mirepoix	Mirepoix-sur-Tarn	France	18 November 2019	Concrete-steel bridge	overweight truck	2 dead, 5 injured	150m long bridge collapsed	
Viadotto Madonna del Monte on A6 Highway (Savona-Torino)	Savona	Italy	24 November 2019	Concrete bridge	heavy rain, landslide	0 dead, 0 injured	30 long highway bridge collapsed	
Caprigliola bridge collapse	Aulla	Italy	8 April 2020	Concrete bridge	Unknown	0 dead, 2 injured	260m long provincial road bridge collapsed	
Bridge over Kola near Murmansk	Murmansk	Russia	1 June 2020	Steel bridge		0 dead	railway bridge collapsed after foundations were washed away by strong water	
Tittle Bridge	Canso, Nova Scotia	Canada	7 July 2020	Truss road bridge	Overweight truck	0 killed, 1 injured	Total failure of bridge	Crews were moving equipment related to replacement of the bridge across it when the collapse occurred.
Pensacola Bay Bridge	Pensacola, Florida	United States	15 September 2020		Unsecured barge during Hurricane Sally	None	Section of bridge collapsed	An unsecured barge during Hurricane Sally crashed into the bridge on September 15, with a crane on said barge falling on the bridge, causing a section of the bridge to collapse into the Pensacola Bay.

== 2021–present ==
Bridge	Location	Country	Date	Construction type, use of bridge	Reason	Casualties	Damage	Comments
Mexico City Metro overpass collapse	Tláhuac Avenue, Tláhuac, Mexico City	Mexico	3 May 2021	Railway/Tram overpass bridge.	Erosion, dilapidation, damage due to the 2017 Puebla earthquake	26 killed, 70+ injured	Partial collapse of a section of the overpass	Collapsed section of the overpass, with a metro-train leaning over the edge.
Bridge over Salmysh near Imangulovo 1-Ye	Oktyabrsky District, Orenburg Oblast	Russia	7 May 2021	Concrete road bridge	Collapsed during repairs, erosion	0 killed, 4 injured	Partial collapse of bridge	4 construction workers were moderately injured. EMERCOM/MChS are taking care of the rubble cleanup operation.
GA Route 86 overpass of Interstate 16	Treutlen County, Georgia near Soperton	United States	15 July 2021	Concrete and steel road bridge	Bridge struck by raised dump trailer	0 injured	Road deck shifted 6 feet (2 m)	I-16 was closed in both directions from Exits 71 (GA Route 15/GA Route 78) to 78 (US Route 221/GA Route 56) as the compromised bridge was demolished and cleared. The affected section of I-16 was reopened within 48 hours of the incident, but GA Route 86 had remained closed. In October 2021, GDOT awarded a US$3.6 million contract to reconstruct the GA Route 86 overpass as well as repave 4 miles (6 km) of US Route 221 that was damaged while I-16 was detoured, and the bridge was opened up to traffic in late July 2022.
Forbes Avenue Bridge over Nine Mile Run and Fern Hollow Creek	Pittsburgh, Pennsylvania	United States	28 January 2022	Steel frame continuous bridge with concrete deck	Corrosion and poor maintenance	0 killed, 10 injured	Complete Collapse of deck and superstructure	A bus and four cars were on bridge deck during collapse. A weight limit of 26 Tons was in place. Following the collapse, PennDOT ordered immediate reviews of structural adequacy for five other bridges with similar designs; those five bridges were found to be in "fair" condition at their last inspections. Replacement bridge opened 20 December the same year.
Loay-Clarin Bridge	Loay, Bohol	Philippines	28 April 2022	Steel frame and concrete surface	Excessive weight, earthquake damage	4 killed, 17 injured		Overloaded bridge collapsed into the Loboc River. The bridge had previously been damaged by an earthquake in 2013, and had a heavy dump truck on it when it collapsed. 3 Filipinos and an Austrian tourist died.
Tretten Bridge	Tretten, Øyer Municipality	Norway	15 August 2022	There were two types of beams used for the trusses on the bridge: glued laminated timber beams were slanted, while the steel beams were vertical; weathering steel was used.	Block shear failure, which caused overloading of other elements in the truss.	0 killed	Complete collapse	Tretten Bridge on the day of the collapse. Investigation is ongoing (as of Q3 2022). It is not desirable to have (laminated) wood from the collapsed bridge, floating down the river; as of August, parts of the bridge were still being lifted out of the river and onto the shore, and investigators are taking photos while the parts are being disconnected from the collapsed bridge.
Sanibel Causeway	Sanibel, Florida	United States	28 September 2022	Concrete Girder Bridges	Collapsed due to Hurricane Ian	0 killed	Partial Collapse	
Ovčar Banja bridge	Ovčar Banja	Serbia	13 October 2022	Pedestrian simple suspension bridge		2 killed, 10 injured	Complete collapse	Bridge over the West Morava river that led to a monastery collapsed while a group of tourists was walking over it. No one was found guilty.
Julto Pul	Morbi, Gujarat	India	30 October 2022	Suspension bridge		141+ killed, 100+ injured		Bridge had been reopened four days earlier, following repairs.
2023 Espoo bridge collapse	Tapiola, Espoo	Finland	10 May 2023	Temporary scaffolding pedestrian bridge	Design modifications weakened already insufficient bridge	23 injured, mostly children	Floor collapsed	The Safety Investigation Authority of Finland found that the Ministry of Transport and the Ministry of the Environment each considered the other responsible for the oversight of pedestrian bridges. Neither the city of Espoo nor the constructor realised that the modifications would have required changes to the structural design as well as design inspection. As of 2025, the police suspects 8 persons of criminal negligence and 2 persons also of violation of official duty.
Interstate 95 bridge collapse	Philadelphia, Pennsylvania	United States	11 June 2023	Highway overpass	Tanker fire on underpass	1 killed	Northbound lanes collapsed, southbound lanes damaged	
2023 Reed Point bridge collapse	Near Columbus, Montana	United States	24 June 2023	Railroad bridge	Train derailment	None killed/injured	Train carries hot asphalt/sulfur	
Modak Bridge over Malan river	Kotdwar, Uttarakhand	India	12 July 2023	Road bridge over river Malan	Collapse due to flooding	None killed/injured	Road Bridge over the Malan river connecting Kotdwar with Haridwar and Dehradun collapsed.	
Randklev Bridge	Ringebu Municipality, Innlandet	Norway	14 August 2023	Railroad bridge over river Lågen	Bridge collapsed during a flood, because a pillar in the river lost its foundation.	None killed/injured		
Mizoram Bridge	Sairang, Mizoram	India	23 August 2023	Railway truss bridge	Bridge collapsed during construction	26 killed	Railway truss bridge collapsed	
Lixinsha Bridge	Guangzhou, Guangdong	People's Republic of China	22 February 2024	Road bridge	Barge collision	5 killed 3 injured	A portion of the bridge collapsed.	2024 Lixinsha Bridge collapse
Francis Scott Key Bridge collapse	Baltimore, Maryland	United States	26 March 2024	Continuous truss road bridge	Ship collision	6 killed, 2+ injured	Complete collapse of main span	A container ship, MV Dali, struck a support column of the bridge. The collapse was caught on video.
Paninsky Bridge	Vyazma, Smolensk Oblast	Russia	8 April 2024	Concrete road bridge over railway line	Dilapidated condition of the bridge, possibly in combination with ground subsidence during the thaw.	1 killed, 6 injured	Four sections of the bridge collapsed onto the railway line; railway line, overhead line and other power lines as well as a gas line are damaged, train traffic is interrupted.	
Ponte di Visletto	Cevio, Canton of Ticino	Switzerland	30 June 2024	Arch bridge over river Maggia	Collapse due to flooding		Partial collapse after flooding of river Maggia.	
Road Bridge Shangluo	Shangluo, Zhashui County, Shaanxi	People's Republic of China	19 July 2024	Road bridge	Collapse due to flooding	at least 38 killed, 24 missing	As a result of heavy rainfall, a section of the highway bridge collapsed.	
Road bridge of Yakang expressway	Ganzi, Sichuan	People's Republic of China	3 August 2024	Road concrete bridge	Collapse due to mudslide	5 missing	Total collapse of road bridge linking two tunnels	
Sanhui New Bridge	Qiandongnan, Guizhou	People's Republic of China	8 August 2024	Arch bridge	Cracks in the bridge	None killed/injured	Collapse of two arches of bridge	
Babb's Covered Bridge	Gorham, Maine	United States	24 August 2024	Historic covered road bridge	Overweight truck	1 injured	Truck fell through a section of the bridge	
Phong Châu Bridge	Lâm Thao, Phú Thọ Province	Vietnam	9 September 2024	Road truss bridge over Red River	Collapse due to flooding caused by Typhoon Yagi	10 missing	Collapse of truss bridge into river	
Carola Bridge	Dresden, Saxony	Germany	11 September 2024	Prestressed concrete road and light rail bridge	Tension wire torn due to corrosion	None killed/injured	Collapse of light rail bridge part	
Red Bridge	Kamloops	Canada	19 September 2024	Road bridge	Fire (allegedly arson)	None killed/injured	Total collapse and destruction	Preceded by another, less destructive fire two days earlier.
Juscelino Kubitschek de Oliveira bridge	between Maranhão and Tocantins states (between Aguiarnopolis and Estreito cities)	Brazil	23 December 2024	Road bridge	Poor maintenance (possible)	13 deaths, 4+ missing		Several vehicles fell into the river, including a tanker truck which spilled its load of sulfuric acid. A local councillor, who went to the bridge to record the extant structural issues, captured the beginning of the collapse.
Portland & Western Mary's River Rail bridge	Corvallis, Oregon	United States	4 January 2025	Rail bridge		No deaths or injuries reported		Bridge collapsed as train was crossing, one car fell into Mary's River.
Cabagan–Santa Maria Bridge	Cabagan and Santa Maria, Isabela	Philippines	27 February 2025	Pre-Stressed concrete girder bridge, (PSCG)	Design Flaws	No deaths, 6 injuries	Partial collapse (third span from Cabagan)	
Old Vaucluse Road overpass of Interstate 20	Aiken County, South Carolina near Vaucluse	United States	14 June 2025	Concrete and steel road bridge	Fire due to fuel truck accident	2 injured	Partial collapse (span over I-20 eastbound)	I-20 was closed in both directions from Exit 11 (Bettis Academy Road) to 18 (SC Highway 19) while the collapsed bridge was demolished. I-20 was reopened within 36 hours of the accident.
Kundmala Bridge Collapse	Indrayani River, Talegoan, Pune	India	15 June 2025	Concrete and iron foot bridge	Overcrowding, bridge repairs ignored	4 killed, 51 injured	Partial collapse	The bridge was 4 feet wide and 400 feet long reportedly overcrowded with seven to eight bikes and a huge crowd of around 100 people when the incident occurred.
Houzihe Bridge Collapse	Houzihe River, Guizhou	People's Republic of China	24 June 2025	Concrete expressway bridge	Landslide caused by continuous intensive rain	No casualties	Partial collapse, 2 spans 100m and 3 spans 150m	
Gambhira Bridge Collapse	Mahi River, Padra, Vadodara	India	9 July 2025	Concrete and iron foot bridge	Overcrowding, bridge repairs ignored	10 killed, 9 injured	Partial collapse	A portion of the bridge collapsed during peak traffic hours, causing multiple vehicles to plunge into the Mahi River. The collapse resulted in at least 10 deaths and nine injuries.
Pedestrian bridge Gabesstraße	Gabesstraße, Auwiesen, Linz, Upper Austria	Austria	16 July 2025	Concrete pedestrian bridge	Truck crashed into bridge	2 injured	Collapse of pedestrian bridge	
Aldridge Creek Bridge	Huntsville, Alabama	United States	22 July 2025	Wooden railroad trestle	Poor maintenance and old age	0 injured	Partial collapse of trestle	Two Rail cars fell into Aldridge Creek and onto the Aldridge Creek Greenway. The bridge was scheduled to be replaced just 2 months after the collapse. A new bridge will be built for $6.3 million with $800,000 to be paid by the City of Huntsville.
Jianzha Yellow River Bridge		People's Republic of China	22 August 2025			12 killed, 4 missing		
Carroll Road bridge	Baltimore County, Maryland	United States	20 October 2025	Metal truss with wooden deck	Under investigation	No injuries or deaths	Total collapse; septic truck crossing bridge destroyed	
Hongqi bridge	Sichuan	People's Republic of China	11 November 2025	Concrete	Initial reports detail the surrounding hillside beginning to shift and cracks developed in the roadway.	No injuries or deaths	Partial collapse	The bridge was completed in 2025 and opened to traffic on 28 September 2025. On 10 November, the bridge was closed to traffic following the discovery of roadway cracks. Open just 44 days, it partially collapsed with no reports of casualties.
Phu Thien suspension bridge	Lam Dong	Vietnam	20 November 2025	Metal and wood	Severe flooding	No injuries or deaths	Total collapse	
Spey Viaduct	Moray	Scotland	14 December 2025	Iron girder. Originally a railway bridge, more recently used by pedestrians and cyclists	Under investigation, but bridge scour has been suggested as a likely cause	No injuries or deaths	Partial collapse	

== Bridge disasters in fiction ==
- The General (1926 film): The fictional Rock River bridge, a wooden trestle bridge purpose-built for the film, is set on fire and later collapses as a train attempts to cross it.
- The Bridge of San Luis Rey (1927 novel): An Inca rope bridge in Peru collapses, with the resulting deaths forming the basis for the novel's plot.
- The Bridge over the River Kwai (1952 novel) and its 1957 film adaptation The Bridge on the River Kwai: The building and destruction of the eponymous bridge form the basis of the plot. In the novel, the bridge is merely damaged; in the film, it is destroyed.
- Ring of Fire (1961 film): An unnamed bridge burns and collapses with the train on it at the film's climax.
- The Good, the Bad, and the Ugly (1966 film): The fictional Branston Bridge is demolished by two of the main characters. The bridge was purpose-built for the film, and needed to be rebuilt and demolished again after the first explosion was set off prematurely. No one was injured, but multiple cameras were destroyed.
- The Cassandra Crossing (1976 film): The eponymous Cassandra Crossing, portrayed by the Garabit Viaduct arch bridge, collapses when a train attempts to cross it.
- The Night the Bridge Fell Down (1983 film): (Note: The film was produced in 1979 and aired in the United Kingdom in 1980, but did not air in the United States until 1983.) The fictional Madison Bridge, portrayed by the Astoria-Megler Bridge, collapses due to a multi-car accident.
- Train Man (1999 novel): The destruction of multiple rail bridges over the Mississippi River forms the basis of the novel's plot.
- Grand Theft Auto 3 (2001 video game): The fictional Callahan Bridge is destroyed by a bomb as the game starts.
- Harry Potter and the Half-Blood Prince (2005 novel): The fictional Brockdale Bridge is destroyed by the Death Eaters. In the 2009 film, this was replaced by the real-world Millennium Bridge, London.
- X-Men: The Last Stand (2006 film): The Golden Gate Bridge is rerouted by mutants to create a path to Alcatraz Island.
- Monsters vs. Aliens (2009 film): The Golden Gate Bridge is destroyed by a giant robot; Ginormica is able to save all of the commuters present.
- Final Destination 5 (2011 film): The fictional North Bay Bridge collapses in the opening scene. The scene was filmed at the Lions Gate Bridge.
- Godzilla (2014 film): Godzilla, under attack by the United States Navy while in pursuit of 2 MUTOs, walks through the road deck of the Golden Gate Bridge.
- San Andreas (2015 film): Several notable structures in the western United States are demolished, including the Golden Gate Bridge, San Francisco-Oakland Bay Bridge, Hoover Dam and the Mike O'Callaghan–Pat Tillman Memorial Bridge.
- London Has Fallen (2016 film): The Chelsea Bridge is destroyed by terrorists.
- Gotham (2018 TV series): Every bridge out of Gotham is destroyed in the climax of season 4.
- Call of Duty: Advanced Warfare (2014 video game): A rogue private military corporation severs several supporting cables of the Golden Gate Bridge, dropping a large section of the main span onto a US Navy aircraft carrier.

== See also ==
- List of Washington state bridge failures
- List of dam failures
- List of structural failures and collapses
- List of accidents and disasters by death toll
- List of road accidents
- Lists of rail accidents
