= Jiujiang Bridge (disambiguation) =

Jiujiang Bridge may refer to:

Bridges in China:

- Jiujiang Yangtze River Bridge, over the Yangtze River in Jiujiang City, Jiangxi
- Jiujiang Fuyin Expressway Bridge currently under construction in Jiujiang City, Jiangxi
- The Jiujiang Bridge in Guangdong, which collapsed in 2007.
