= Gambhira Bridge collapse =

Bridge collapse in Gujarat, India

- Date: 9 July 2025
- Time: 7:30 a.m. IST (UTC+05:30)
- Location: Padra, Vadodara district, Gujarat, India; 22.2632°N 72.9984°E
- Cause: Structural failure
- Deaths: 22
- Injuries: Dozens

The Gambhira Bridge collapse occurred on 9 July 2025 in Padra, Gujarat, India, resulting in 22 deaths and several injuries. While the official cause of the collapse is under investigation, it is believed to have been caused by a structural failure brought on by a combination of heavy use and inadequate maintenance.

The collapse led to an investigation to be launched by Bhupendra Patel, the Chief Minister of Gujarat, and Indian Prime Minister Narendra Modi to pay a compensation of ₹200,000 (US$2,100) for the families of the deceased. Seven days after the accident on 16 July, more than 1,800 bridges across Gujarat had their structures inspected to prevent similar incidents, resulting in the closure of 20 bridges completely and 113 partially for heavy vehicles.

== Background ==
The Gambhira Bridge is a concrete road bridge located in Padra, Vadodara district, Gujarat, India. Built in 1985, it spanned several hundreds of meters over the Mahi River, connecting Mujpur village in Padra taluka with Gambhira in Anand district. The bridge serves as a key route between Central Gujarat and the Saurashtra region.

== Collapse ==
At approximately 7:30 a.m. on 9 July 2025, a portion of the bridge collapsed during peak traffic hours, causing multiple vehicles to plunge into the Mahi River. The collapse resulted in at least 22 deaths and nine injuries. According to officials, four vehicles—including two trucks, a pickup van, and a micro van—along with two motorcycles, were on the bridge when a slab between two piers gave way. A survivor reported hearing a loud cracking noise before her vehicle plunged into the water. Eyewitness videos showed a tanker left dangling precariously at the edge of the collapsed section, and rescue teams reported hearing cries for help from those trapped inside submerged vehicles.

On 10 July the death toll rose to 18. On 11 July the death toll rose to 21, after a man died in the Sayaji hospital and two bodies were found under the debris. On 5 August the death toll roses to 22 after a man succumbed to his injuries in the hospital.

=== Rescue and emergency response ===
Personnel from the National Disaster Response Force (NDRF) and State Disaster Response Force (SDRF), along with local fire brigades and divers, were deployed to the site for search and rescue operations. At least ten people were rescued from the river. Four people were reported missing as of July 10. Local hospitals, including Padra Referral Hospital and SSG Hospital in Vadodara, received the injured and the deceased for treatment and autopsy.

=== Official responses ===
The Chief Minister of Gujarat, Bhupendra Patel, ordered an immediate investigation and mobilized emergency services. He also instructed the Vadodara Collector to ensure timely medical treatment for the injured.

Prime Minister Narendra Modi's office announced compensation of ₹200,000 (US$2,100) for the families of the deceased and ₹50,000 (US$520) for the injured, from the Prime Minister's National Relief Fund.

=== Aftermath and investigation ===
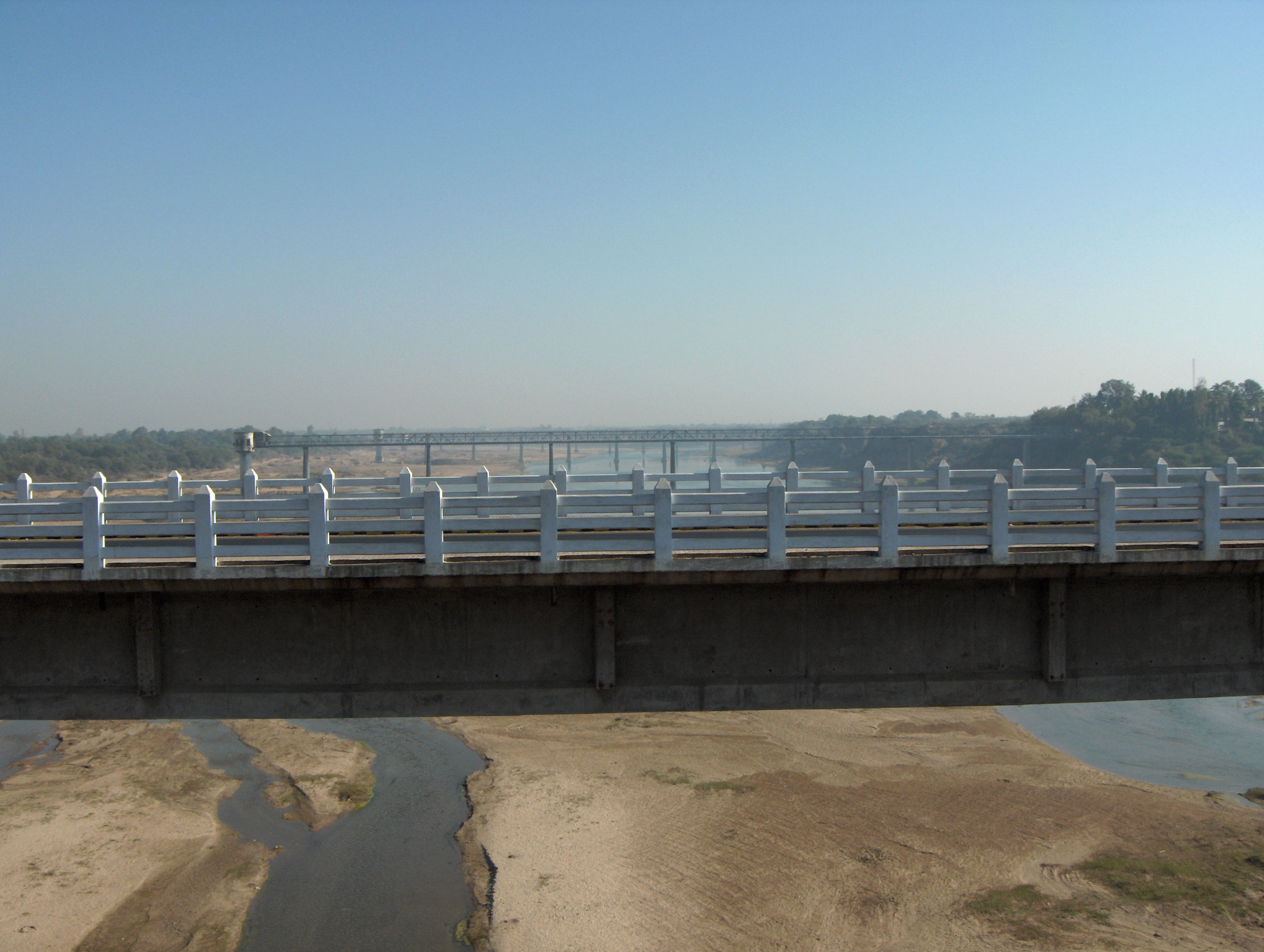
Similar bridge over the Mahi River in Vadodara district

According to Rushikesh Patel, the Health Minister of Gujarat, the bridge was originally constructed in 1985 and underwent periodic maintenance. However, local residents had reportedly warned authorities about the deteriorating condition of the bridge for several years. The Vadodara district police registered a case of accidental death and announced a formal inquiry to determine the cause of the collapse. The Road and Building Department also launched a technical probe into the structural failure.

Initial findings revealed there were shortcomings in maintenance and supervision of the bridge. As a result, Chief Minister Bhupendra Patel has suspended on 10 July four engineers from the Roads and Buildings Department. Patel has also called for a high-level probe into the structural failure of the bridge.

More than 1800 bridges across Gujarat were inspected. 20 bridges were completely closed and 113 were partially closed for heavy vehicles following the assessment as precaution.

=== Reconstruction ===
Construction of a replacement bridge began on 14 August 2025 at a cost of ₹212 crore (US$22 million). Following the collapse, the old bridge had been partly reopened to two-wheelers and pedestrians, with four-wheelers and heavy vehicles barred. The new 854.5-metre, two-lane bridge, which has 23 spans on 21 piers, was inaugurated by Chief Minister Bhupendra Patel on 20 September 2026, restoring the direct road link between Vadodara and Anand districts.

=== Victims ===
Among the deceased were three members of the Parmar family, Hasmukh Parmar of Majatan, Vakhatsinh Jadav of Kahanva, and Pravin Jadav of Undel village. Injured victims included Sonal Padhiyar, the sole survivor from the van she traveled in, along with several others whose identities were later confirmed. Children were among the victims. A man from Borsad died in Sayaji hospital on 11 July. Another man who succumbed to his injuries in a hospital on August 5. Dilip Padhiyar (34), also a resident of Borsad taluka of Anand district, died during treatment at the government-run SSG Hospital.

== See also ==
- 2022 Morbi bridge collapse
- List of bridge failures
