= Lixinsha Bridge =

Bridge in Guangzhou, China

Lixinsha Bridge 沥心沙大桥
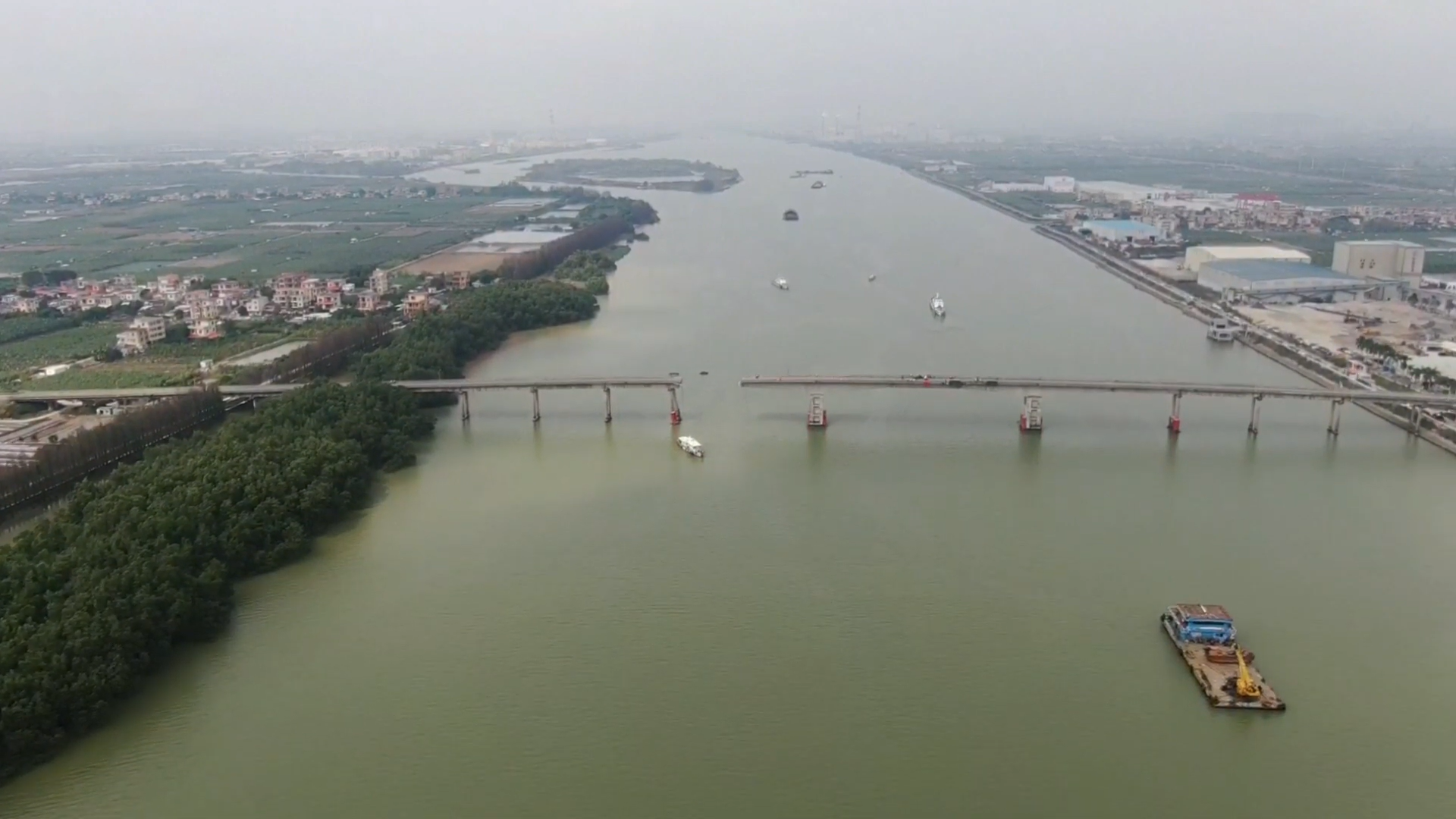
- Aerial view of Lixinsha Bridge
- Coordinates: 22°39′7″N 113°33′26″E
- Carried: 2 lanes of Lixinsha Road and water supply to Sanmin Island
- Crossed: Hongqili Waterway (part of the Pearl River Delta)

Characteristics
- Total length: 787 meters
- Width: 9.8 meters

History
- Opened: April 1994; 22 June 2024 (rebuild)
- Collapsed: 22 February 2024

Location
- Interactive map of Lixinsha Bridge

Lixinsha Bridge, also known as Lixindao Bridge, Sanmin Island Bridge, or Hongqili Second Bridge. Located in Guangzhou, Guangdong, China, the bridge connects Sanmin Island, one of the smaller islands along the Hongqili Waterway to the Jiuyong and the rest of the urban area. As the only land bridge connecting Sanmin Island, it carries the island's only water supply pipeline.

The bridge is 787 meters long and 9.8 meters wide. The bridge is designed as a single carriageway and has no pedestrian walkway. It also has a main and two secondary navigation arches for watercraft to pass through.

== History ==
The bridge was completed in April 1994 and was opened to vehicular traffic.

In 2009, the bridge was reinforced, increasing its load capacity. In 2019, due to the discovery of severe deterioration in its structure, after inspection, the bridge was classified as a Category 4 bridge. (Note: Highway bridges are classified into 5 categories in China by authorities according to their prevailing conditions, with Category 1 being the best, and Category 5 the worst.) The governing authorities of Nansha District then restricted the usage of the bridge to vehicles weighing less than 15 tonnes as a temporary measure. After rectification and reinforcement works in 2020, the bridge was reinspected and given a Category 2 rating, and vehicles weighing less than 20 tonnes could now be used on the bridge.

In October 2021, after an assessment of water navigation conditions around the bridge and the nearby Gaoxinsha Bridge, it was decided to add anti-collision measures to the bridges. The construction of the additional anti collision measures was completed in December 2022.

Reinforcement work, including constructing "collision avoidance facilities" at four bridge piers, was completed in 2022.

=== Collision ===
On February 22, 2024, at about 5:30 am, a cargo barge collided with a bridge pier, causing a portion of the deck of the bridge to fracture and fall into the waters below. The barge, carrying only the operator, first grazed the 18th bridge pier and then collided with the 19th pier. The ship was trapped below a fractured part of the bridge. Two vehicles plunged into the river and three others fell onto the barge, leaving five dead and three others injured. The vehicles in the collapse included an electric motorbike and a public bus carrying only the driver. The people who died were the driver of the bus, the driver of the scooter and three people in the trucks that fell into the river.

==== Rescue and recovery ====
The China Rescue and Salvage Bureau of the Chinese Ministry of Transport dispatched its rescue team and vehicles from its rescue base in Guangzhou to carry out search and rescue operations. From the Shenzhen rescue base, a high-speed rescue boat "Nanhai Rescue 321" and team members were also dispatched to aid the operation.

By 4:10 p.m. local time, the two trucks that fell into water were recovered, with the bodies of their drivers and passenger recovered separately later in the evening.

The Guangzhou Maritime Safety Administration implemented a temporary water traffic control on the waters within 500 meters upstream and downstream of the bridge, prohibiting passage of all watercraft but official and maintenance watercraft.

==== Aftermath ====
The captain of the ship was detained. People living in the vicinity were evacuated.

An investigation started into the cause of the collapse. The ship company cooperated in the investigation.

Staff from the China Railway Construction Corporation conducted an on-site inspection after the collision and assessed that there would not be any risk of a second collapse of the bridge. In an evening press conference of the same day of the collapse, the chief engineer of the Guangzhou Transportation Management Bureau reported that the 19th bridge pier had been seriously damaged and tilted, and the span beams between the 19th and 20th piers had to be replaced as well. Based on the assessments of the bridge and its surroundings on-site, a repair and reinforcement plan would be formulated. On February 25, the demolition work on the damaged span began, and it was expected that the overall repair work to be completed in four to five months' time.

After the collision, the water supply to the island was interrupted. As an interim measure, the local water utilities connected the island to a temporary water supply pipeline through the still under construction Nanzhong Expressway, (Note: The Nanzhong Expressway cuts across the southern part of the Sanmin Island and has bridges to connect the island to other parts of the province. The entire expressway started construction in 2020, with an expected date of completion in 2024.) providing temporary relief to the villagers on the island, with an expectation that the water supply would be fully restored several days later. Authorities also had dispatched water trucks to provide residents with portable water. The Lixinsha Bridge also carries the island's communications fiber optic cables and electrical cables. In the collision, some of the fiber optics cables were damaged and caused the communications to be interrupted briefly for the day. There was no interruption to the island's power supply as the electrical cables did not suffer any damage and there was already a second set of power cables installed in the Nanzhong Expressway six months ago. To allow people and goods to enter and exit the island, the local government built a temporary dock by the following morning after the collision, and planned to build a temporary bridge as well.

==== Repair ====
On May 23, 2024，the repair work on the bridge was completed. On June 12, the bridge was certified for use. The bridge was reopened to traffic on June 22, 10 a.m.

== See also ==
- Collapse of Jiujiang Bridge
- List of bridge failures
