= Eden train wreck =

1904 train wreck and bridge failure in U.S.

Coordinates: 38°22.555′N 104°37.145′W

Bridge collapse at Eden, Colorado (Illustrirtes Wiener Extrablatt, 1904)

The Eden train wreck of August 7, 1904, occurred when the No. 11 Missouri Pacific Flyer from Denver, Colorado, to St Louis, Missouri, crossed the Dry Creek arroyo bridge near Eden Station, 8 miles (13 km) north of Pueblo, Colorado. As the engine crossed the bridge, a flash flood wave passed over the trestle shearing off the front half of the train and dragging 97 people to their deaths with 22 missing and another dying later of injuries.

== Crash ==
The engineer, Charles Hinman, had been given a thunderstorm caution and had slowed the train to 10–15 mph (16–24 km/h) to watch for washaways. After the engine had crossed the creek, a large wave threw the cars over to the right, broke the coupling to the rear 2 Pullman and dining cars, and dragged the engine backwards into the river. The Pullman's porter, Melville Sales of St. Louis, quickly pulled the emergency air brakes saving the remaining passengers. The front Pullman car was left hanging 4 feet (1.2 m) over the edge of what remained of the bridge.

== Survivors ==
Of the 100 people in the engine, baggage, smoking and chair cars, 3 passengers and 1 fireman escaped from the wreckage, the fireman being thrown from the engine and the 3 survivors escaping from the smoking car [1 passenger died of injuries]. Eyewitness reports say 29 people were saved in the rear of the train; newspapers accounts vary.

== Response ==
The first rescue train arrived at the scene 4 hours after the accident. As the flood waters receded, searchers found bodies as much as 22 miles (35 km) down the Arkansas River. Bloodhounds were used but had to be recalled because of quicksand.

== Aftermath ==
The engine was submerged near the bridge; the chair car was found almost a mile from the bridge buried in sand, and the baggage and smoking cars were found more than 4 miles (6.4 km) downriver. "The body of a woman about twenty-five years old, handsomely dressed, was found twenty-two miles down the Arkansas River and brought here to be identified." 24 hours after the accident, the bridge had been rebuilt and train traffic had resumed.

== See also ==
- Lists of rail accidents
- List of bridge failures
