= Carola Bridge =

Bridge over the Elbe in Dresden, Germany

Coordinates: 51.0547°N 13.7470°E

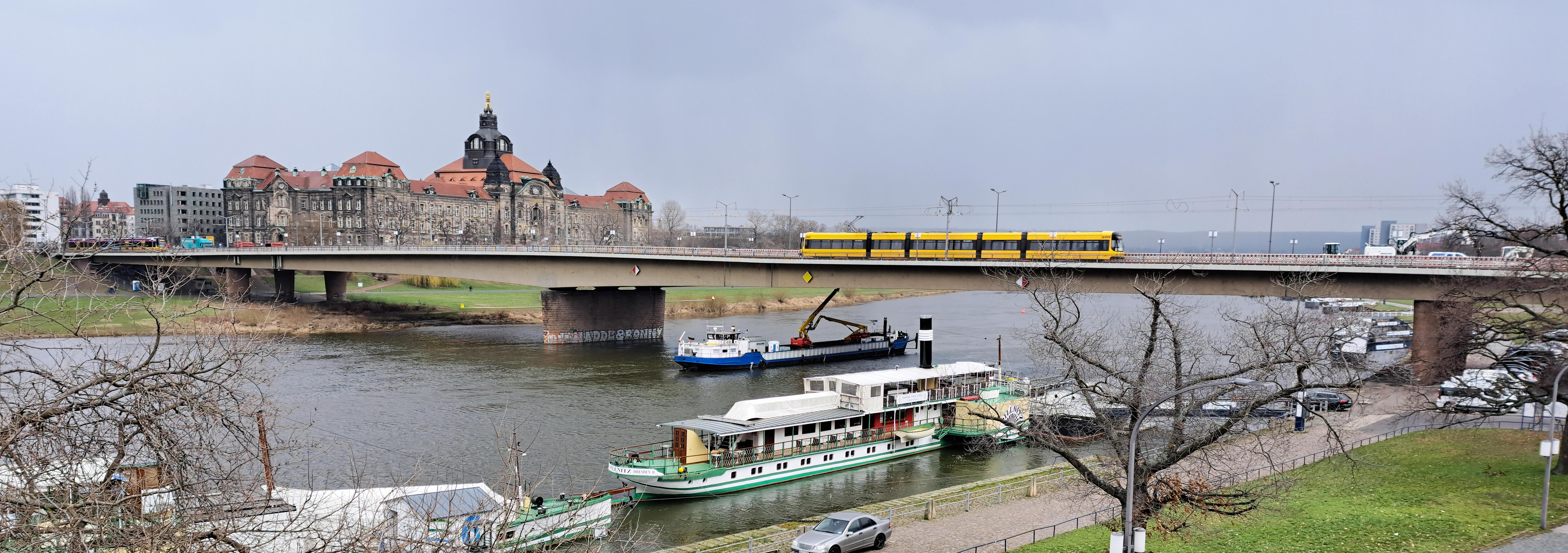
The Carola Bridge in March 2023

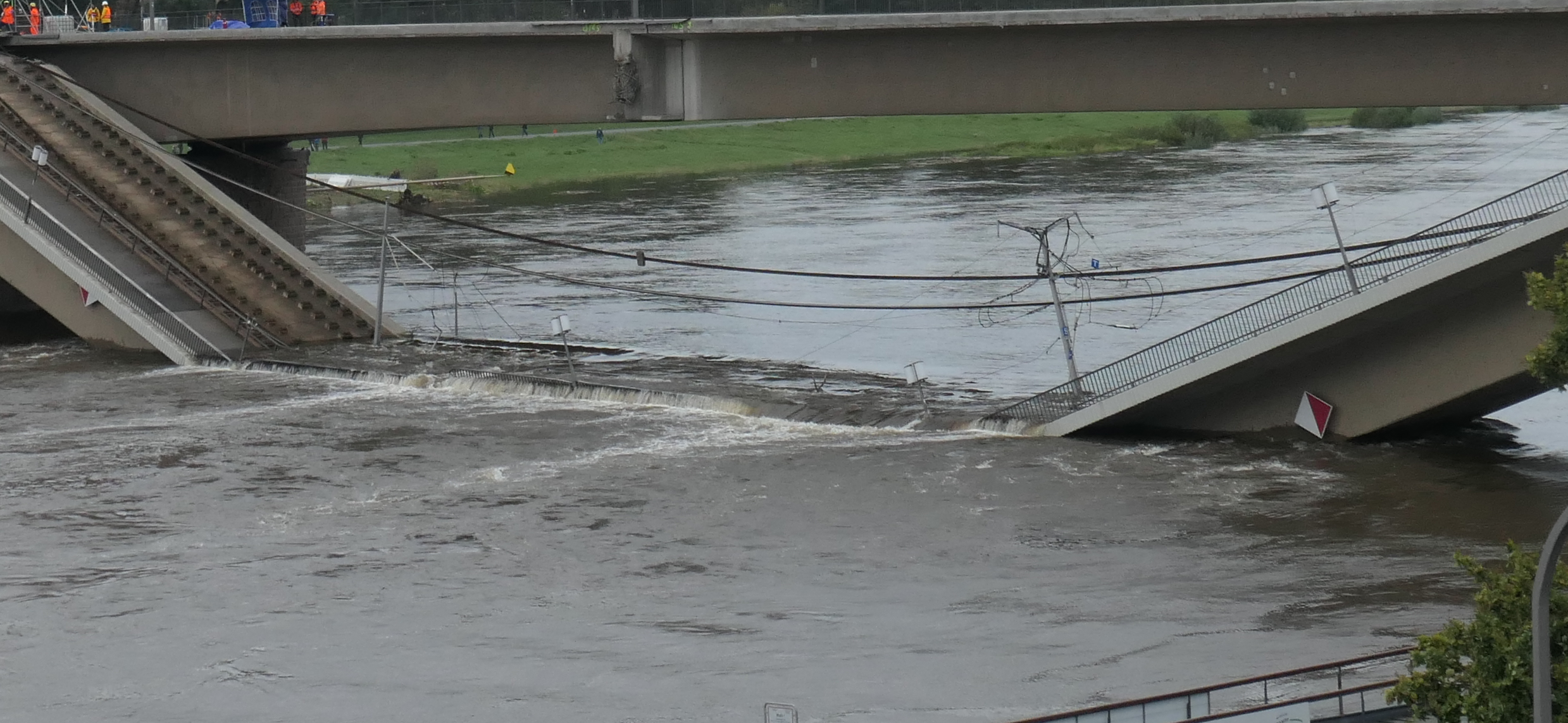
The aftermath of the bridge collapse in September 2024

The Carola Bridge (German: Carolabrücke) was a road and tram bridge in Dresden, Germany, spanning the Elbe river. Originally built in 1895, it was destroyed by the SS on May 7, 1945 to slow the Soviet advance near the end of World War II. A replacement bridge was constructed between 1967 and 1971. A major section of the modern bridge collapsed into the Elbe on 11 September 2024. As of June 2025, the entire structure is undergoing demolition.

== First Bridge ==
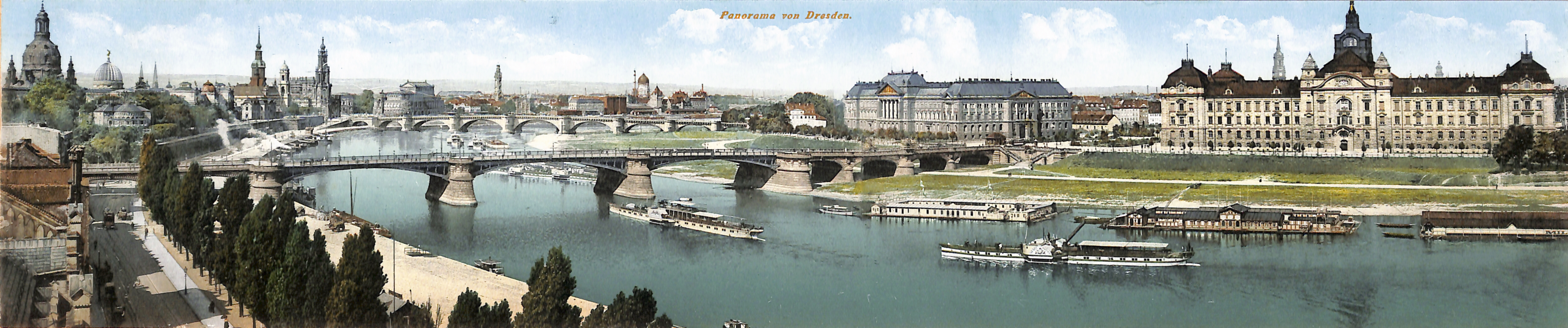
Bridge panorama in 1910

The bridge was built in 1895 to fill the needs of the growing city. It was destroyed by the SS on 7 May 1945 to slow the Soviet advance near the end of World War II.

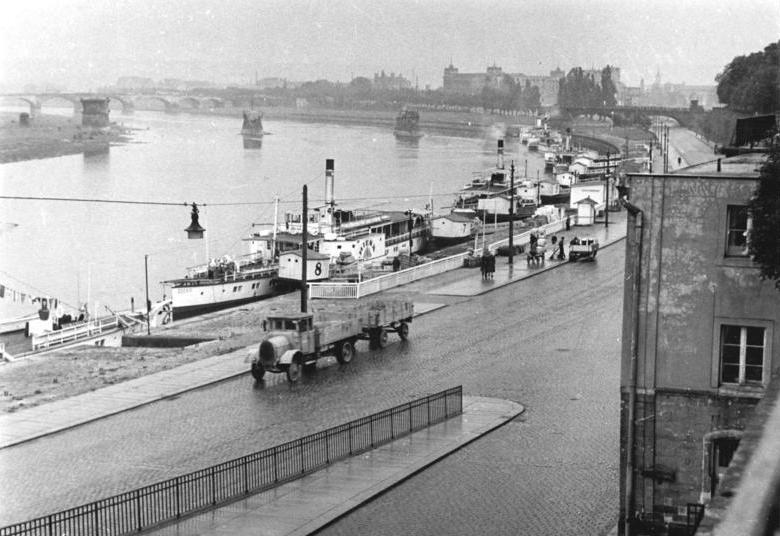
Pillars of the first bridge in 1952

== Second Bridge ==
=== Description ===
The new Carola Bridge was designed following a 1965 architectural competition. Specifications required a slender structure without chains or suspension elements, so as not to obstruct Dresden’s historic skyline. It also needed to minimise the number of pillars to preserve river navigation.

The bridge consisted of three parallel decks—A, B, and C—constructed from prestressed concrete. Deck C was designated for tram service, while decks A and B carried vehicular traffic. Each deck was composed of four segments connected by expansion joints. The second joint linked all three decks to distribute exceptional stress.

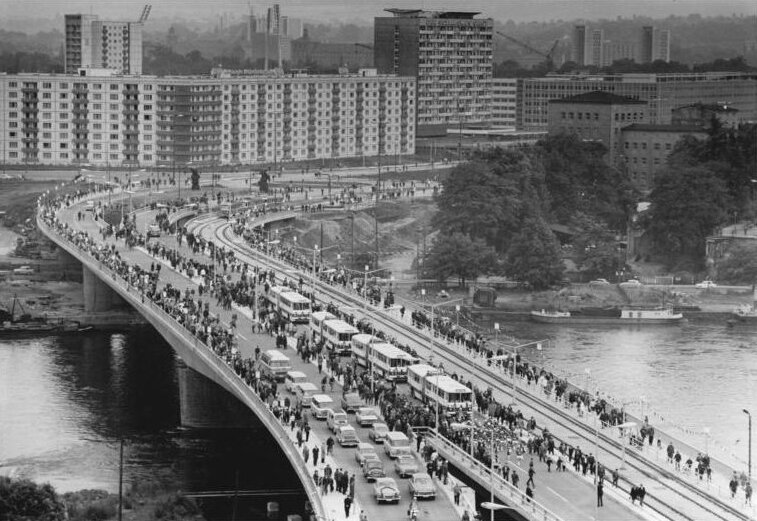
Opening of the second bridge on July 3, 1971

Renovation work began in 2019. Roadway replacements for decks A and B were completed, while deck C was scheduled for refurbishment. In 2022, the bridge was declared a protected monument.

=== Collapse ===
Deck C collapsed between 02:58 and 02:59 (UTC+2) on 11 September 2024. No casualties were reported. However, critical infrastructure inside the bridge—including district heating pipelines—was destroyed, leaving large areas of Dresden without heating. A temporary pipeline was laid across the Augustus Bridge to restore service before winter.

Demolition of the damaged deck began the next day, but was interrupted by the 2024 Central European floods. The collapse had shifted decks A and B, and engineers identified structural flaws shared with deck C. As a result, demolition of the entire bridge was approved.

In early 2025, unexploded World War II ordnance was discovered on-site, requiring evacuations and further delaying work. In February 2025, structural sensors detected cracks in the steel reinforcements of decks A and B, prompting accelerated demolition under emergency safety regulations.

== Third Bridge ==
The Dresden city council approved construction of a new bridge, which is planned to start in 2027. The bridge will serve the same purpose as the old one. It will consist of two spans with four lanes of car traffic, tram tracks, extended bike lanes and foot paths.

== See also ==
- List of bridge failures
- Augustus Bridge
- Elbe River
- Transport in Dresden
