= Yekaterinburg bridge collapse =

2006 engineering incident in Yekaterinburg, Russia

In the Yekaterinburg bridge collapse in Russia, on September 6, 2006 (according to Itar-Tass) railway traffic was paralyzed by the collapse of an automobile bridge near the center of city.

== Overview ==
The head of the Sverdlovsk Railway, Shevket Shaidullin, said damage caused by the incident was “quite significant.”

“A total of 111 freight trains and 104 passenger trains were delayed. Changes to the train schedule incurred big costs,” he said.

He said, however, that the railway tracks had not been damaged.

Three of 10 reinforced-concrete beams of the bridge span above the railway fell onto the rail tracks. Work to dismantle the other six remaining beams was conducted through the joint efforts of railwaymen and builders. The bridge beams were first separated from one another by slits and then lowered to the ground by means of emergency train jibs.

The automobile bridge that was under construction in the center of Yekaterinburg collapsed at the crossing of Shevchenko and Vostochnaya Streets on Monday afternoon. Traffic along Vostochnaya Street that is one of the main highways of the city was blocked. According to Sverdlovsk Railways, east- and west-bound train traffic through the Sverdlovsk junction station was also stopped.

City Mayor Arkady Mikhailovich Chernetsky said a gross design mistake might have caused the collapse of the bridge.

== Causes ==
“Possible causes may also include a mistake made by builders, but this is unlikely because the contractor is a very reliable company. It is too early to make concrete conclusions. They will be made by a special commission,” Chernetsky said.

Federal court of the Kirovsky residential area of Yekaterinburg judged that Viktor Menshikov, director of a municipality "Blagoustroistvo" is responsible for bridge collapse. Bridge collapsed because construction works were conducted with a violation of a city-building codex. Also, director didn't send a bridge design documents for public examination and didn't receive an approval for construction of the bridge.

== Casualties ==
There were no casualties in the Yekaterinburg highway bridge collapse, but the incident halted west- and east-bound railroad traffic through the city, the information department of Russia's Emergencies Ministry told Itar-Tass.

Chernetsky said the bridge was supposed to become operational in November. He said the bridge would be built anyway because “this is an important element of transport infrastructure.”

== See also ==
- List of bridge disasters
