= Belo Horizonte overpass collapse =

2014 overpass collapse in Brazil

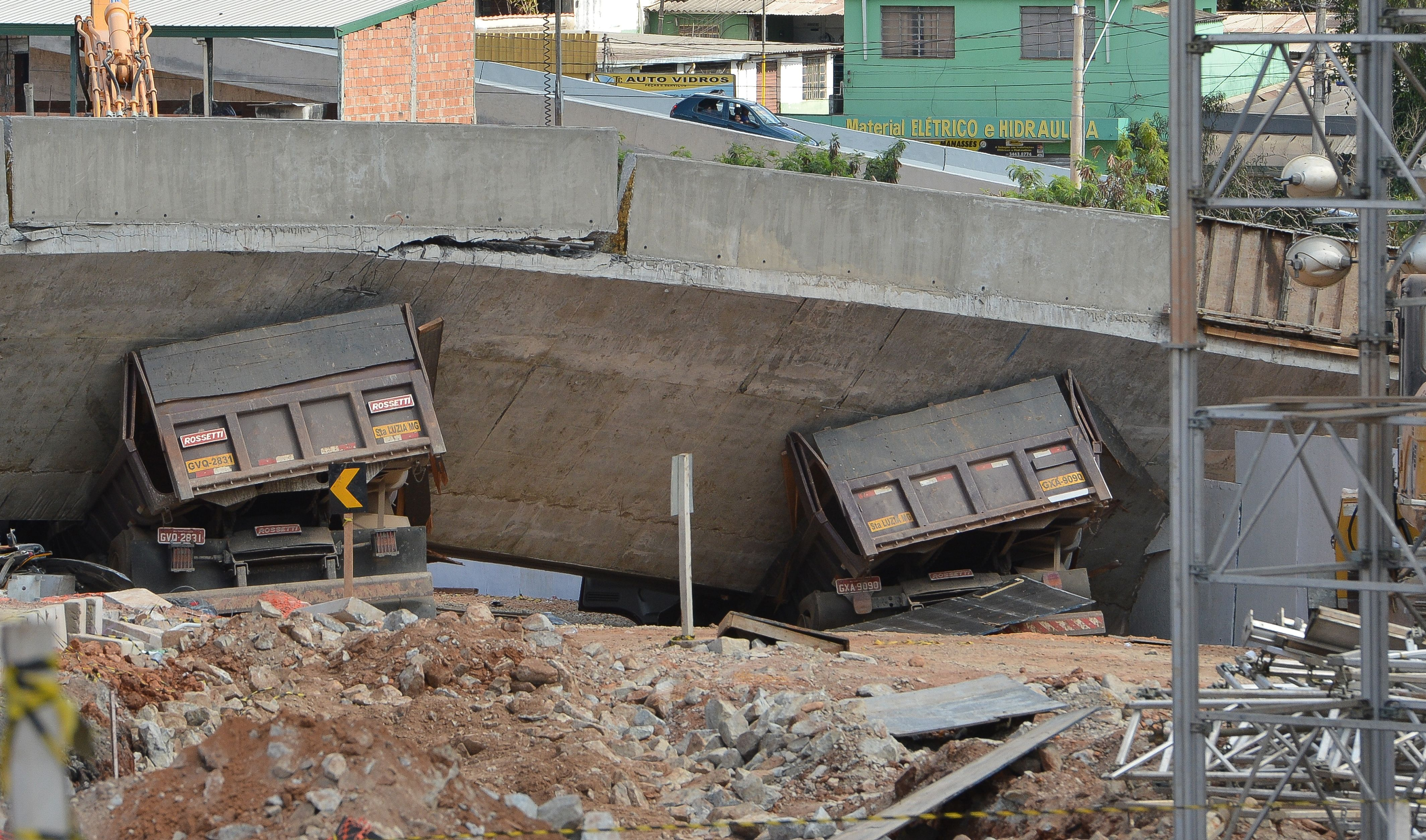
- The overpass ruins.
- Date: 3 July 2014
- Location: Belo Horizonte, Minas Gerais, Brazil
- Deaths: 2
- Injuries: 22

On 3 July 2014, an overpass collapsed in Belo Horizonte, Brazil onto a busy carriageway below. The overpass was under construction and not open to traffic at the time. The accident left two people dead and 22 others injured.

== Background ==
The construction project was part of infrastructural improvements meant to prepare for the 2014 FIFA World Cup that was taking place at the time of the collapse. The bridge was to be part of the Move (Belo Horizonte) Bus rapid transit system. The concrete and steel bridge was located 3 kilometers from the Mineirão, where many games at the World Cup were played. The construction began in 2010 and was scheduled to be completed in May 2014. The World Cup was already unpopular with the Brazilian public due to the heavy costs to tax payers.

== Accident ==
On 3 July 2014, the overpass collapsed onto the busy carriageway Avenida Pedro I below. A bus and several cars were crushed under the rubble. The bus driver and another person were killed, and 22 other people were injured. At least 12 of the injured were taken to hospital; five others were released following treatment at the accident site.

== Investigation ==
The company that was building the overpass, Cowan Construction, immediately set up a forensic team to investigate the causes of the accident. Technical staff were sent out to the accident site on the day of the collapse.

== Reaction ==
One witness criticised the involved authorities and businesses for "not making things properly" and blamed the accelerated construction schedules and their "incompetence" for the disaster. The bank worker also claimed that "Everyone is angry." President of Brazil Dilma Rousseff offered her condolences "to the victims' families" in a Twitter post. The City Hall of Belo Horizonte released a statement announcing that Marcio Lacerda, Mayor of Belo Horizonte, had officially declared three days of mourning in the city.

== See also ==
- List of bridge failures
