= 2023 Espoo bridge collapse =

2023 accident in Finland

Video from the road below the bridge later on the day of the accident.

On 10 May 2023, the floor of a temporary scaffolding pedestrian bridge collapsed in Espoo, Finland, when a 40-person group of eighth-grade pupils on an excursion to Espoo Museum of Modern Art were crossing the bridge after exiting the Tapiola metro station. 24 children and their teacher were reported injured. 23 people fell 4 to 5 meters down from the bridge which was a continuation of Helmakuja over Itätuulenkuja. The injured were taken to four hospitals.

== Accident investigation ==
The constructor of the bridge, Renta Group, explained in its sustainability report that their internal investigation "displayed that mistakes had been made in the design and construction of the bridge which involved multiple parties" and that they "immediately stopped the construction of similar structures" as well as "increased internal and external audits and the training our employees undergo."

Safety Investigation Authority of Finland found that Ministry of Transport and Ministry of the Environment each considered the other one responsible for the oversight of pedestrian bridges. Neither City of Espoo nor the constructor realised that the modifications would have required structural design as well as design inspection.

== Criminal investigation ==
In March 2025, the National Bureau of Investigation concluded its criminal investigation and as a result suspected 8 persons of criminal negligence and 2 persons also of violation of official duty.

As of April 2025, the public prosecutor had indicted at least 2 persons, employees of the constructor, for gross negligent injury and for the offence of imperilment.

== Aftermath outside Finland ==
Bridge Owners Forum in the UK listed the accident in its grand challenge Preventing bridge failures as an example of a recent in-service bridge collapse.

== See also ==
- List of bridge failures
