= Imangulovo =

Imangulovo Имангулово
- Village
- Location within Bashkortostan Location within Russia
- Coordinates: 54°26′N 53°37′E
- Country: Russia
- Region: Bashkortostan
- District: Tuymazinsky District
- Time zone: UTC+5:00

Imangulovo (Russian: Имангулово; Bashkir: Иманғол, İmanğol) is a rural locality (a village) in Verkhnebishindinsky Selsoviet, Tuymazinsky District, Bashkortostan, Russia. The population was 133 as of 2010. There are 5 streets.

== Geography ==
Imangulovo is located 29 km southwest of Tuymazy (the district's administrative centre) by road. Kuyuktamak is the nearest rural locality.
