= Jianzha Yellow River Bridge =

Bridge across Yellow River in China

Jianzha Yellow River Bridge 尖扎黄河特大桥
- Coordinates: 35°54′30″N 102°3′26″E
- Carried: Sichuan–Qinghai railway
- Crossed: Yellow River
- Locale: Border of Jianzha county, Huangnan prefecture and Hualong county, Haidong city, Qinghai, China

Characteristics
- Design: Continuous truss arch bridge
- Material: Steel
- Total length: 649.6 m
- Width: 14 m
- Longest span: 366 m
- No. of spans: 3

Rail characteristics
- No. of tracks: 2
- Track gauge: 1,435 mm (4 ft 8 1/2 in)
- Electrified: 25 kV AC

History
- Engineering design by: China Railway First Survey and Design Institute Group
- Constructed by: China Railway Major Bridge Engineering Group
- Construction start: 2023; 3 years ago
- Collapsed: August 22, 2025; 13 months ago (during construction)

Location
- Interactive map of Jianzha Yellow River Bridge

The Jianzha Yellow River Bridge (尖扎黄河特大桥) is an under-construction steel railway bridge of the Sichuan–Qinghai railway across the Yellow River located on the border of Jianzha county, Huangnan prefecture and Hualong county, Haidong city, both in Qinghai, China.

The bridge is to be 1,596.2 m (5,237 ft) long, with a span of 366 m (1,201 ft).

The bridge is being constructed by China Railway Major Bridge Engineering Group, and was scheduled to be completed by the end of August 2025.

When completed, it will be China's first railway continuous truss arch bridge across the Yellow River and the world's largest double-track continuous steel truss arch bridge.

== Construction ==
On December 2, 2023, all the foundation of the main pier of the bridge was poured, marking the formal start of the construction of the upper part of the bridge.

== Collapse ==
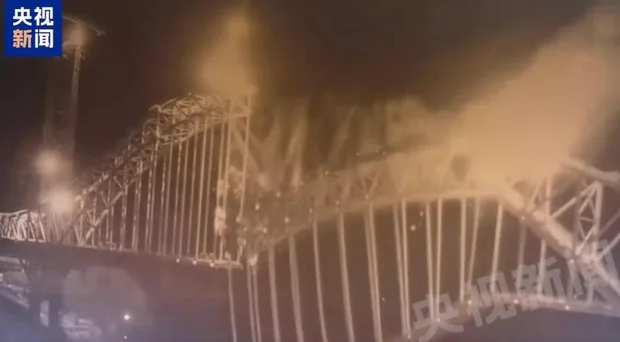
A CCTV still of the collapse

At around 3:10 a.m. local time on August 22, 2025, a steel cable broke during construction of the bridge, causing the middle of the bridge's arch section to collapse. There were 15 workers and a project manager working at the time of the collapse. Thirteen people died and another three were reported missing. Rescue efforts involved 806 personnel supported by 91 vehicles, 27 boats, one helicopter and five robots. Six local hospitals opened green channels to carry out medical treatment. An investigation team composed of four specialized units that focus on coordination, technical analysis, management review, and rescue evaluation was established by the Qinghai government. The Office of the Work Safety Commission set up a working group with related authorities to guide the investigation into the accident. A report on the causes and responsibilities of the accident, as well as recommendations for disciplinary and legal actions will be released promptly.

The investigation concluded that the accident was caused by substandard bolts used in the construction of a temporary tower, together with subpar manufacturing and installation quality of the top distribution beam.

The report also said that the construction, design, supervision and other relevant parties failed to perform their safety production responsibilities adequately, while the industry regulatory authorities did not properly fulfil their supervisory duties.
