= Sigiri Bridge =

- Coordinates: 0°5′40″N 33°59′31″E
- Carries: Pedestrians and motor vehicles
- Crosses: Nzoia River
- Locale: Kenya

Characteristics
- Total length: 100m
- Longest span: 32m

History
- Opened: 31 August 2018

Location
- Interactive map of Sigiri Bridge

The Sigiri Bridge is a three span bridge which collapsed while under construction over the Nzoia River, Budalangi, Busia, in Kenya. It was contracted to Chinese Overseas Construction and Engineering Company (COVEC), a subsidiary of the state-owned China Railway, at a cost of $12 million.

Uhuru Kenyatta, who was seeking reelection at the time, has highlighted his focus on infrastructure development, including a new railway linking Nairobi and the port city of Mombasa. He pledged to build a bridge in Busia county after a boat carrying 16 people capsized in River Nzoia, killing at least 9.

== Structural design ==
Sigiri Bridge is a multi span deck-type plate girder bridge. The bridge is supported by two abutments 100m apart and two piers located 25m from the abutments. The bridge deck is divided into three spans with each of the two flank spans extending beyond the piers by 9m resulting in a mid-span length of 32m. The three deck spans are designed as composite steel and reinforced concrete decks consisting of 12 steel I-beams which together with the concrete above act as composite T-beams.

== Construction ==
=== Collapse during construction ===
The mid-span section of the bridge collapsed on 26 June 2017. At the time, the flank span on the southern side of the river had been concreted and the placing of concrete to the mid-span deck had been completed the weekend before while the northern span had not been cast. At least 27 workers were injured by the incident.

=== Reconstruction launched ===
The contractor of the bridge COVEC accepted responsibility for the collapse of the bridge and the Kenyan Government have launched reconstruction of the works.

=== Reconstructed bridge opened to the public ===
Government authorities cleared Sigiri Bridge for use to the public on 31 August 2018.

== See also ==
- Madaraka Express, another Chinese infrastructure project in Kenya under the presidency of Uhuru Kenyatta
