= Injaka Dam =

- Interactive map of Injaka Dam
- Official name: Injaka Dam; Inyaka Dam
- Country: South Africa
- Location: Bushbuckridge, Mpumalanga
- Coordinates: 24°53′04″S 31°05′05″E
- Purpose: Irrigation
- Opening date: 2001
- Owner: Department of Water Affairs

Dam and spillways
- Type of dam: Earth fill dam
- Impounds: Ngwaritsane River
- Height: 51 m
- Length: 550 m

Reservoir
- Creates: Injaka Dam Reservoir
- Total capacity: 125 027 000 m³
- Catchment area: 209 km^{2}
- Surface area: 811.1 ha

Injaka Dam, also spelled Inyaka Dam is an earth-fill type dam located on the Ngwaritsane River, near Bushbuckridge, Mpumalanga, South Africa. It was established in 2001 and its primary purpose is to store water for irrigation use. The hazard potential of the dam has been ranked as high (3).

== History ==
Injaka Dam, also known as Inyaka Dam, was developed as part of the Eastern Subsystem Augmentation Project within the Inkomati Water Management Area. The project was initiated by the former Department of Water Affairs and Forestry to improve water security in the Bushbuckridge area of Mpumalanga, which had historically experienced limited access to reliable water supplies for domestic use, irrigation and economic development.

Planning for the project began during the early 1990s following studies that identified the need for additional water storage capacity in the Sabie River catchment. Construction of the dam commenced in 1996 on the Marite River, a tributary of the Sabie River. The dam was designed primarily to supply water to communities in the former Gazankulu homeland area and to support irrigation schemes, poverty alleviation initiatives and regional economic development in Bushbuckridge. Construction was substantially completed in 2001, with final commissioning and impoundment activities continuing into 2002.

=== Injaka Bridge collapse ===
On 6 July 1998, the Injaka Bridge, a 300-metre seven-span prestressed concrete bridge under construction across the future reservoir area, collapsed during an inspection while being incrementally launched into position. The collapse killed 14 people and injured 19 others. Those who died included consulting engineers, construction personnel and casual labourers involved in the project.

An investigation by the Department of Labour found that the bridge failed due to a combination of design deficiencies, construction errors, inadequate quality control and insufficient independent review of the temporary works used during construction. Despite recommendations for criminal prosecution against several organisations and individuals involved in the project, prosecutors later decided not to pursue charges.

== Location and characteristics ==
Injaka Dam is situated within Ward 9 of the Bushbuckridge Local Municipality in the Ehlanzeni District Municipality, Mpumalanga. The dam is located at approximately 24°53′04″S 31°05′05″E on the Marite River, a tributary of the Sabie River.

The earth-fill dam has a height of 51 metres and a crest length of 550 metres. The reservoir has a total storage capacity of approximately 125 million cubic metres and a catchment area of 209 square kilometres. The Department of Water and Sanitation classifies the dam as having a high hazard potential.

== See also ==
- List of reservoirs and dams in South Africa
- List of rivers of South Africa
