= Padra =

Padra પાદરા
- Town
- Location in Gujarat, India Padra (India)
- Coordinates: 22.23°N 73.08°E
- Country: India
- State: Gujarat
- District: Vadodara

Government
  - Body: Municipality
- Elevation: 79 m (259 ft)

Population (2011)
  - Total: 46,660

Languages
  - Official: Gujarati, Hindi
- Time zone: UTC+5:30 (IST)
- PIN: 391 440
- Telephone code: 912662
- Vehicle registration: GJ6
- Website: gujaratindia.com

Padra is a town and a municipality in the Vadodara district in the Indian state of Gujarat. Padra is located about 6 kilometres from the Western End of Vadodara city. Urban Aggolomeration Area of Vadodara.

== Geography ==
Padra is located at 22.23°N 73.08°E. It has an average elevation of 79 metres (259 feet).

== Demographics ==
As of 2020 India census, Padra had a population of 2,00,000. Males constitute 52% of the population and females 48%. Padra has an average literacy rate of 77%, higher than the national average of 59.5%: male literacy is 81%, and female literacy is 72%. In Padra, 11% of the population is under 6 years of age.

== Economy ==
Padra is one of the most industrialise town in the district of Vadodara, Gujarat. There are many famous industrial groups who have invested on Padra - Jambusar State Highway. There are many chemicals, Pharmaceuticals, Glass and Electronics industries are working there. The Indian pharmaceutical company Cadila Healthcare has a plant to make active pharmaceutical ingredient at Dabhasa within Padra taluka. Rubamin Laboratories is a research based manufacturer of Pharmaceuticals & Fine Chemicals, having a plant located at Dabhasa (Padra). It delivers value added intermediates to API manufacturers. Metrochem Industries is a large scale manufacturer and exporter of dyestuff and dye intermediates also located at village Umraya. Kampun Industries is located at Narsipura which is in the different types of PE/EVA foam products. The company's corporate office is located in Vapi. Madhav Agro Foods, a twice National award winner for quality and consumer satisfaction is a medium scale agri-processing firm also located in Dabhasa on Padra-Jambusar highway. It is engaged in manufacture and export of ethnic Gujarati and Indian food products to USA, UK and Australia.

Padra is also well known for vegetable farming. Padra's green and fresh vegetable reaches to Mumbai, Surat, New Delhi, Ahmedabad, Vadodara and many other cities in India. Padra is also well known for producing Toor Dal (a yellowish, rich in protein type of lentil which is a part of everyday Gujarati food). Padra is also known for producing cotton and tobacco.

Padra is very well known for manufacturing traditional gold and silver jewellery, mainly handcrafted. Padra is also famous for cheap and good quality leather footwear.

== Transport ==
Padra is well connected through State Highways from Vadodara to Jambusar, Bharuch and Karjan. Padra have state Transport Bus Stop. Also private Cabs and Buses are available to move from one place to another. Further the Main railway junction - Vadodara Railway station is only 15 km far from Padra Bus Stop. And The Vadodara International Airport is about 20 km. Padra is also connected to Pratapnagar(Vadodara) and Jambusar by Pratapnagar-Jambusar Narrow Gauge Railway Line having two pairs of train arriving and departing throughout the day.

== Politics ==
Padra is one of 182 constituencies in Gujarat's state legislature, the Gujarat Assembly. The seat was won in the 2017 elections by Jaspalsinh Padhiyar of the [(congress Party)] () with 80% of the vote..In 2022 it is won by BJP member Advocate Chaitanyasinh Zala . Padra is a Sub District i.e. Taluka (Tehsil) Place, and there are approx 84 villages lies under this Sub.District.
