= Collapse of Jiujiang Bridge =

2007 bridge collapse in Foshan, China

Coordinates: 22.8062°N 113.0260°E

The Collapse of Jiujiang Bridge (Chinese: 九江大桥垮塌事故) refers to the partial collapse of a freeway bridge in the city of Foshan, in Guangdong province in the People's Republic of China on June 15, 2007. The bridge, which spans the Xijiang River, collapsed at approximately 5:30 am. A freighter "Nanguiji 035" with a cargo of sand strayed from the navigation channel and struck one of the main pillars, causing approximately 200 metres (660 ft) of the bridge to fall into the river. It is believed that four cars on the highway, carrying nine passengers, were submerged in the river as a result. Eight bodies were recovered. All 10 crew members of the boat were rescued.
