= Precast concrete =

Construction material

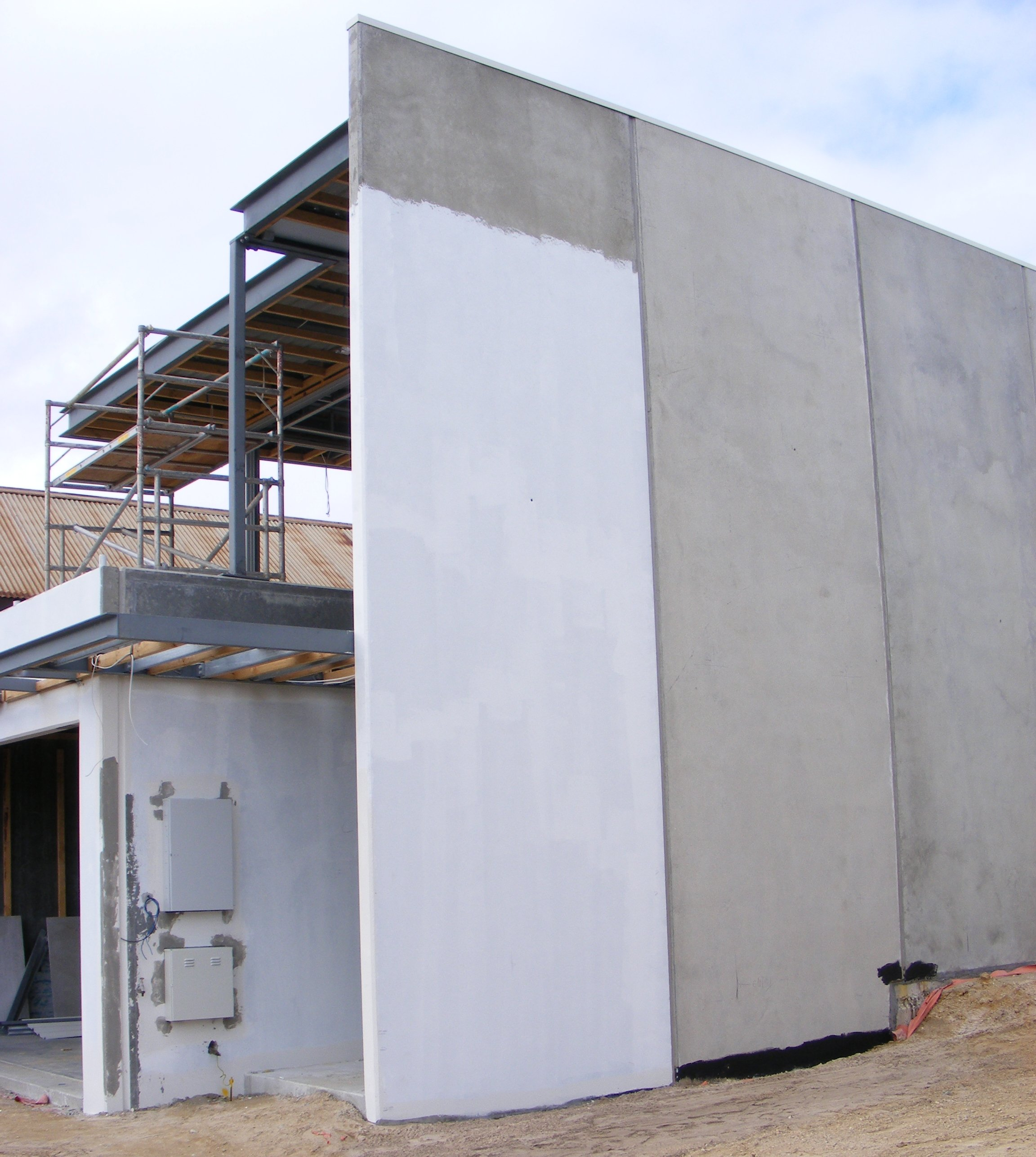
A precast concrete walled house under construction

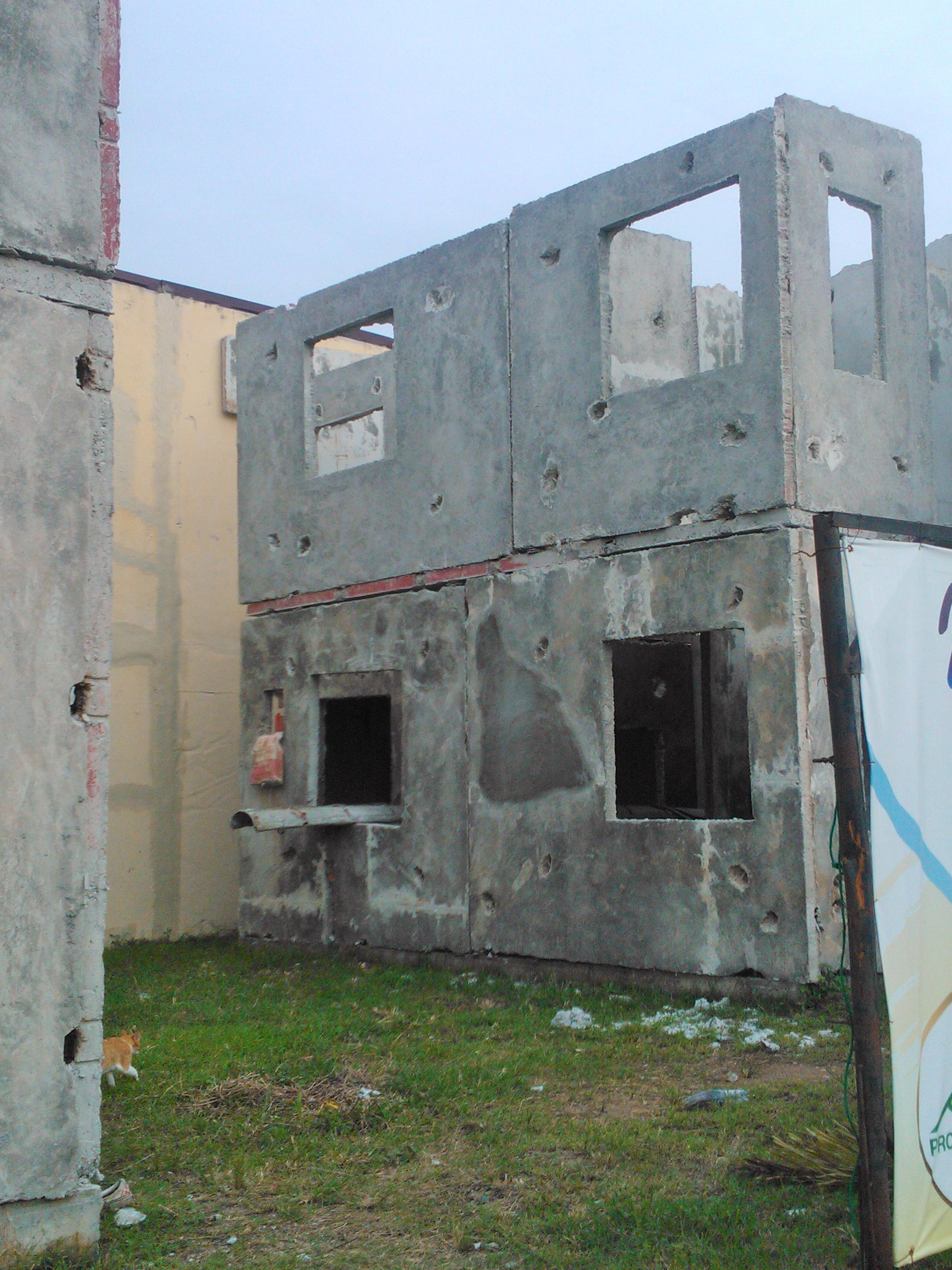
An example of low-quality precast concrete with exposed dowels, connectors, indications of cracks, and malformations, even during its installation, Barangay Lantic, Carmona, Cavite, Philippines

Interior view of the walls, supports, and roof of a precast commercial shop in Williston, North Dakota, US. Utilities are preassembled into the precast components.

Precast concrete is a construction product produced by casting concrete in a reusable mold or "form" which is then cured in a controlled environment, transported to the construction site and maneuvered into place; examples include precast beams, and wall panels, floors, roofs, and piles. In contrast, cast-in-place concrete is poured into site-specific forms and cured on site.

Recently, lightweight expanded polystyrene foam is being used as the cores of precast wall panels, saving weight and increasing thermal insulation.

Precast stone is distinguished from precast concrete by the finer aggregate used in the mixture, so the result approaches the natural product.

== Overview ==
Precast concrete is employed in both interior and exterior applications, from highway, bridge, and high-rise projects to parking structures, K-12 schools, warehouses, mixed-use, and industrial building construction. By producing precast concrete in a controlled environment (typically referred to as a precast plant), the precast concrete is afforded the opportunity to properly cure and be closely monitored by plant employees. Using a precast concrete system offers many potential advantages over onsite casting. Precast concrete production can be performed on ground level, which maximizes safety in its casting. There is greater control over material quality and workmanship in a precast plant compared to a construction site. The forms used in a precast plant can be reused hundreds to thousands of times before they have to be replaced, often making it cheaper than onsite casting in terms of cost per unit of formwork.

Precast concrete forming systems for architectural applications differ in size, function, and cost. Precast architectural panels are also used to clad all or part of a building facade or erect free-standing walls for landscaping, soundproofing, and security. In appropriate instances precast products – such as beams for bridges, highways, and parking structure decks – can be prestressed structural elements. Stormwater drainage, water and sewage pipes, and tunnels also make use of precast concrete units.

Precast concrete molds can be made of timber, steel, plastic, rubber, fiberglass, or other synthetic materials, with each giving a unique finish. In addition, many surface finishes for the four precast wall panel types – sandwich, plastered sandwich, inner layer and cladding panels – are available, including those creating the looks of horizontal boards and ashlar stone. Color may be added to the concrete mix, and the proportions and size aggregate also affect the appearance and texture of finished concrete surfaces.

== History ==
Ancient Roman builders made use of concrete and soon poured the material into moulds to build their complex network of aqueducts, culverts, and tunnels. Modern uses for pre-cast technology include a variety of architectural and structural applications – including individual parts, or even entire building systems.

In the modern world, precast panelled buildings were pioneered in Liverpool, England, in 1905. The process was invented by city engineer John Alexander Brodie. The tram stables at Walton in Liverpool followed in 1906. The idea was not taken up extensively in Britain. However, it was adopted all over the world, particularly in Central and Eastern Europe as well as in Million Programme in Scandinavia.

In the US, precast concrete has evolved as two sub-industries, each represented by a major association. The precast concrete structures industry, represented primarily by of the Precast/Prestressed Concrete Institute (PCI), focuses on prestressed concrete elements and on other precast concrete elements used in above-ground structures such as buildings, parking structures, and bridges, while the precast concrete products industry produces utility, underground, and other non-prestressed products, and is represented primarily by the National Precast Concrete Association (NPCA).

In Australia, The New South Wales Government Railways made extensive use of precast concrete construction for its stations and similar buildings. Between 1917 and 1932, it erected 145 such buildings.

Beyond cladding panels and structural elements, entire buildings can be assembled from precast concrete. Precast assembly enables fast completion of commercial shops and offices with minimal labor. For example, the Jim Bridger Building in Williston, North Dakota, was precast in Minnesota with air, electrical, water, and fiber utilities preinstalled into the building panels. The panels were transported over 800 miles to the Bakken oilfields, and the commercial building was assembled by three workers in minimal time. The building houses over 40,000 square feet of shops and offices. Virtually the entire building was fabricated in Minnesota.

== Reinforcement ==
Reinforcing concrete with steel improves strength and durability. On its own, concrete has good compressive strength, but lacks tensile and shear strength and can be subject to cracking when bearing loads for long periods of time. Steel offers high tensile and shear strength to make up for what concrete lacks. Steel behaves similarly to concrete in changing environments, which means it will shrink and expand with concrete, helping avoid cracking.

Rebar is the most common form of concrete reinforcement. It is typically made from steel, manufactured with ribbing to bond with concrete as it cures. Rebar is versatile enough to be bent or assembled to support the shape of any concrete structure. Carbon steel is the most common rebar material. However, stainless steel, galvanized steel, and epoxy coatings can prevent corrosion.

== Products ==
The following is a sampling of the numerous products that utilize precast/prestressed concrete. While this is not a complete list, the majority of precast/prestressed products typically fall under one or

=== Agricultural products ===
Since precast concrete products can withstand the most extreme weather conditions and will hold up for many decades of constant usage they have wide applications in agriculture. These include bunker silos, cattle feed bunks, cattle grid, agricultural fencing, H-bunks, J-bunks, livestock slats, livestock watering trough, feed troughs, concrete panels, slurry channels, and more. Prestressed concrete panels are widely used in the UK for a variety of applications including agricultural buildings, grain stores, silage clamps, slurry stores, livestock walling and general retaining walls. Panels can be used horizontally and placed either inside the webbings of RSJs (I-beam) or in front of them. Alternatively panels can be cast into a concrete foundation and used as a cantilever retaining wall.

=== Building and site amenities ===
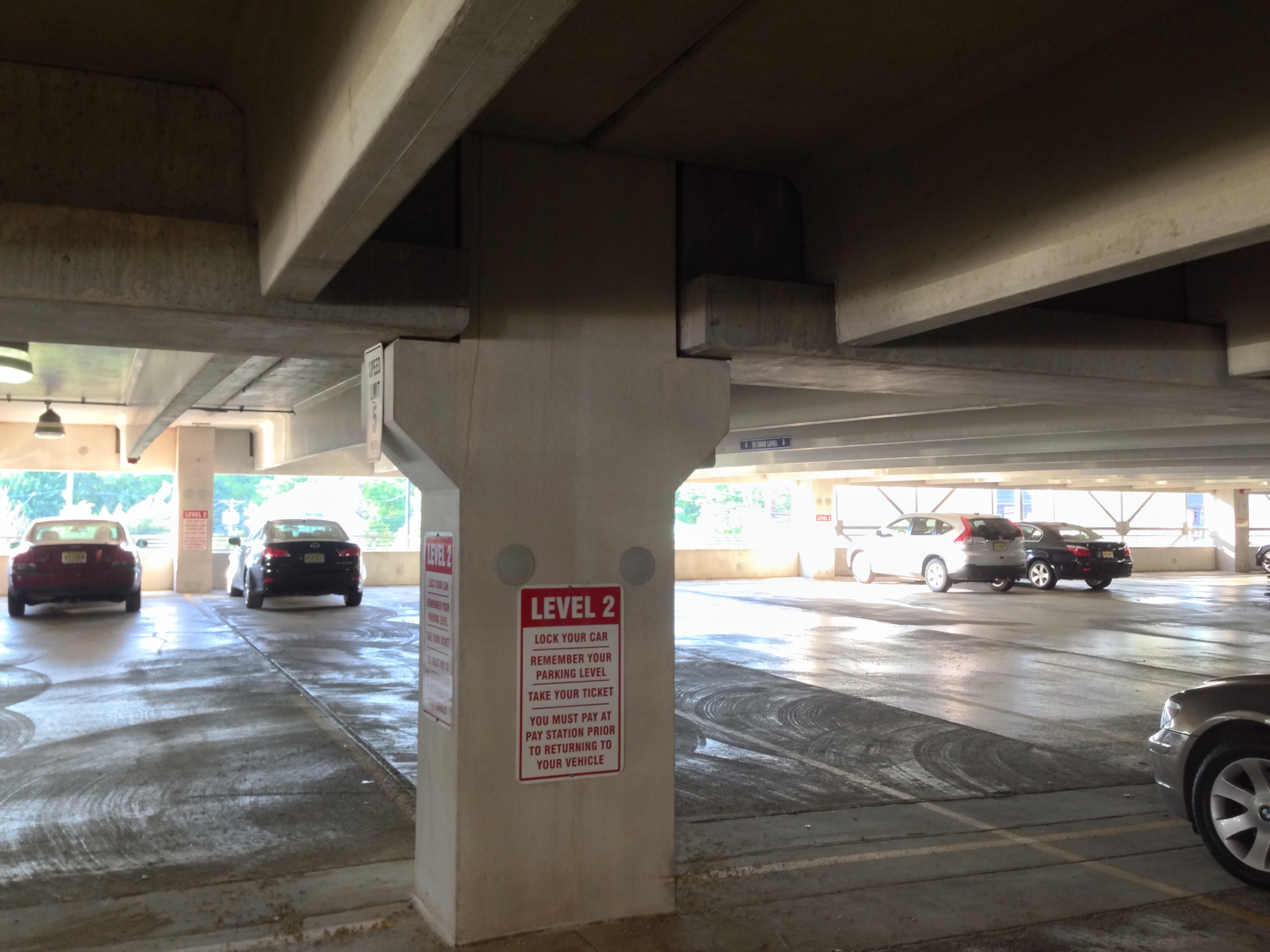
Precast parking structure showing an interior column, girders, and double-tee structural floors. The two gray circles are covers to close the lifting anchor holes.

Precast concrete building components and site amenities are used architecturally as fireplace mantels, cladding, trim products, accessories and curtain walls. Structural applications of precast concrete include foundations, beams, floors, walls and other structural components. It is essential that each structural component be designed and tested to withstand both the tensile and compressive loads that the member will be subjected to over its lifespan. Expanded polystyrene cores are now in precast concrete panels for structural use, making them lighter and serving as thermal insulation.

Multi-storey car parks are commonly constructed using precast concrete. The constructions involve putting together precast parking parts which are multi-storey structural wall panels, interior and exterior columns, structural floors, girders, wall panels, stairs, and slabs. These parts can be large; for example, double-tee structural floor modules need to be lifted into place with the help of precast concrete lifting anchor systems.

=== Retaining walls ===
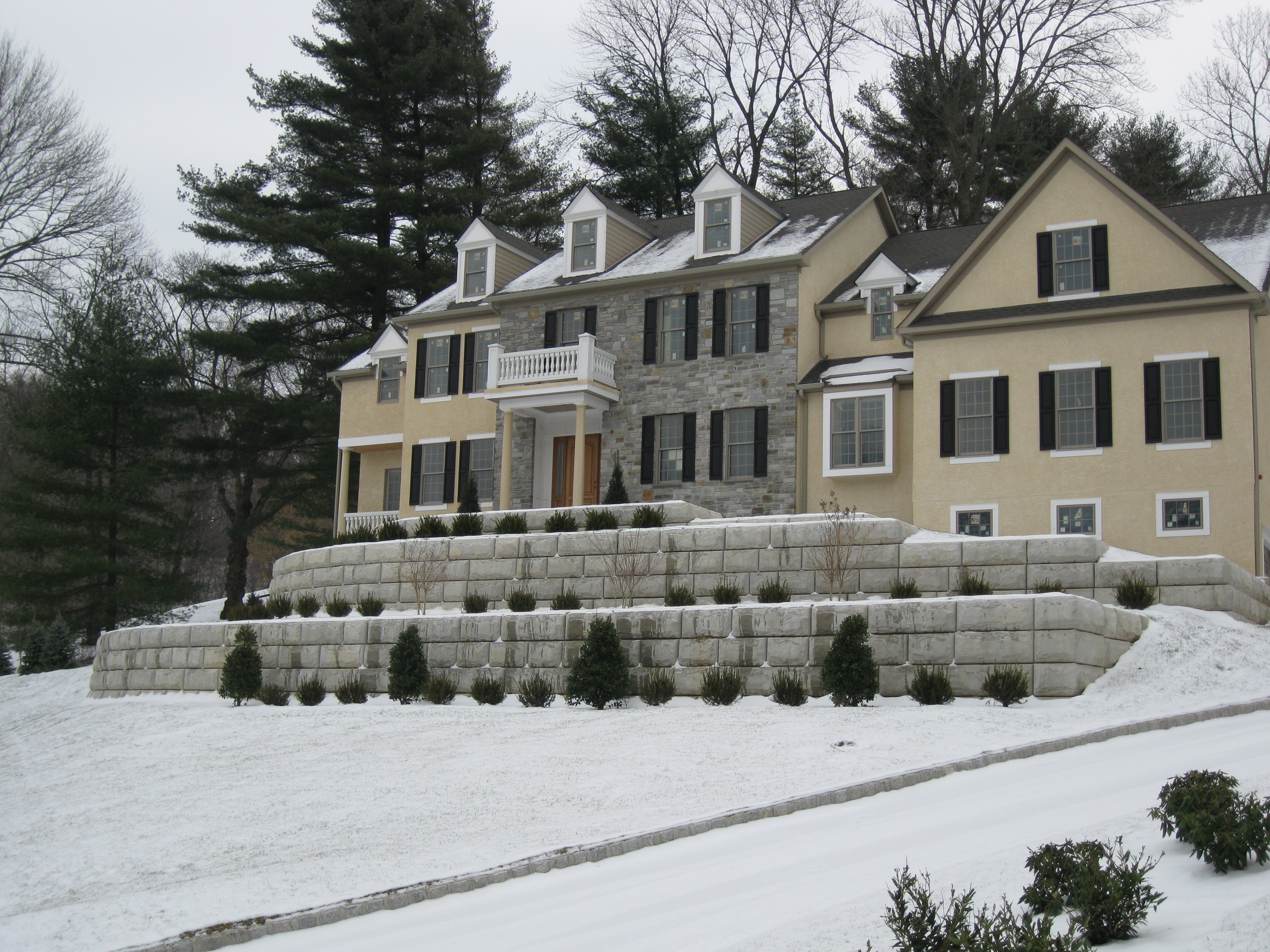
A retaining wall made of modular precast concrete blocks

Precast concrete is employed in a wide range of engineered earth retaining systems. Products include commercial and residential retaining walls, sea walls, mechanically stabilized earth panels, and other modular block systems.

=== Sanitary and stormwater ===
Sanitary and stormwater management products are structures designed for underground installation that have been specifically engineered for the treatment and removal of pollutants from sanitary and stormwater run-off. These precast concrete products include stormwater detention vaults, catch basins, and manholes.

=== Utility structures ===
For communications, electrical, gas or steam systems, precast concrete utility structures protect the vital connections and controls for utility distribution. Precast concrete is nontoxic and environmentally safe. Products include: hand holes, hollow-core products, light pole bases, meter boxes, panel vaults, pull boxes, telecommunications structures, transformer pads, transformer vaults, trenches, utility buildings, utility vaults, utility poles, controlled environment vaults (CEVs), and other utility structures.

=== Water and wastewater products ===
Precast water and wastewater products hold or contain water, oil or other liquids for the purpose of further processing into non-contaminating liquids and soil products. Products include: aeration systems, distribution boxes, dosing tanks, dry wells, grease interceptors, leaching pits, sand-oil/oil-water interceptors, septic tanks, water/sewage storage tanks, wet wells, fire cisterns, and other water and wastewater products.

=== Transportation and traffic-related products ===
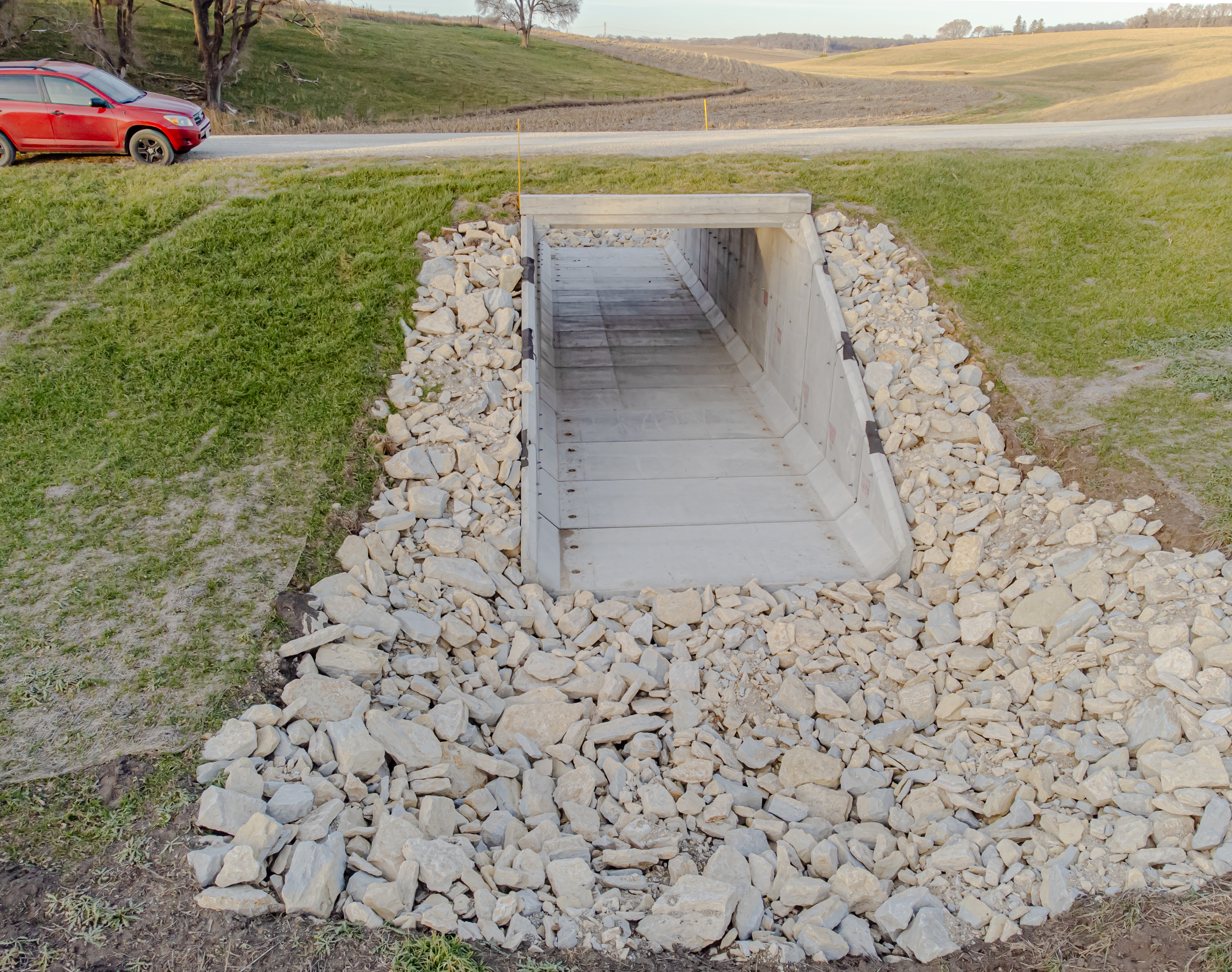
Precast concrete box culvert

Precast concrete transportation products are used in the construction, safety, and site protection of roads, airports, and railroad transportation systems. Products include: box culverts, 3-sided culverts, bridge systems, railroad crossings, railroad ties, sound walls/barriers, Jersey barriers, tunnel segments, concrete barriers, TVCBs, central reservation barriers, bollards, and other transportation products. Precast concrete can also be used to make underpasses, surface crossings, and pedestrian subways. Precast concrete is also used for the roll ways of some rubber-tyred metros.

=== Modular paving ===
Modular paving is available in different colours, shapes, sizes, and textures. These precast concrete pieces can be designed to mimic brick, stone or wood.

=== Specialized products ===
==== Cemetery products ====
Underground vaults or mausoleums require watertight structures that withstand natural forces for extended periods of time.

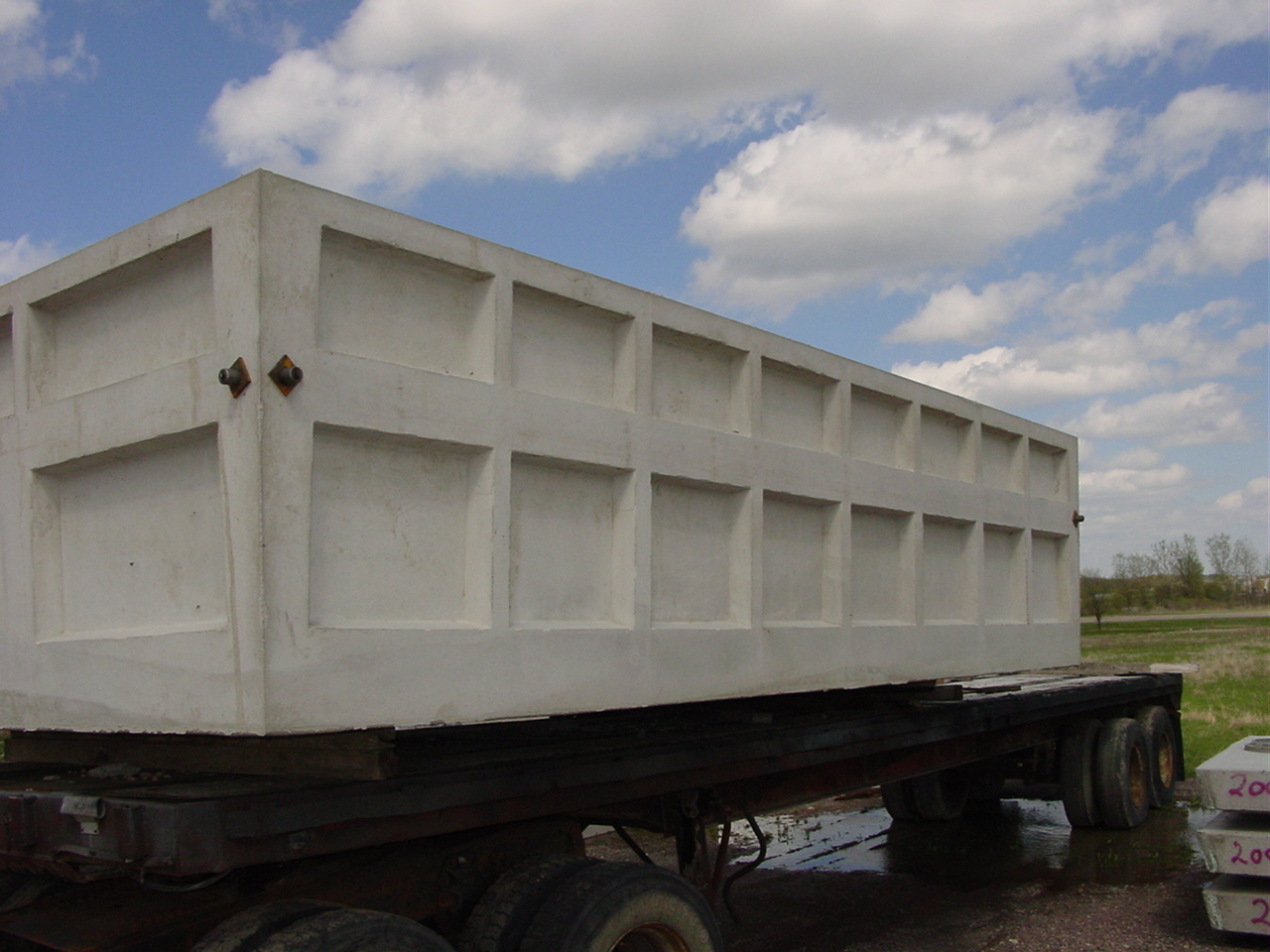
A precast concrete hazardous material storage container

==== Hazardous materials containment ====
Storage of hazardous material, whether short-term or long-term, is an increasingly important environmental issue, calling for containers that not only seal in the materials, but are strong enough to stand up to natural disasters or terrorist attacks.

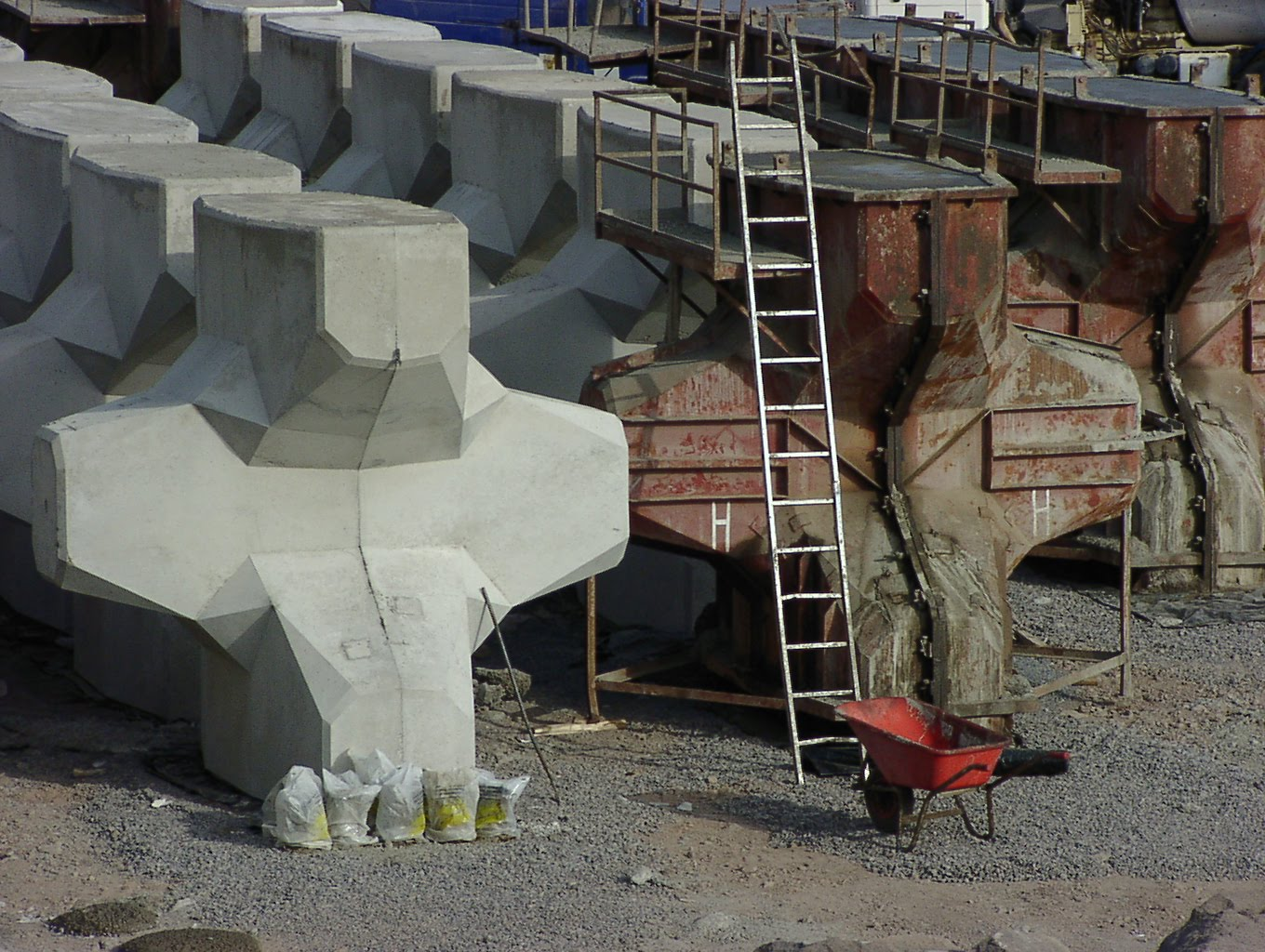
A precast concrete armour unit (Accropode)

==== Marine products ====
Seawalls, floating docks, underwater infrastructure, decking, railings, and a host of amenities are among the uses of precast along the waterfront. When designed with heavy weight in mind, precast products counteract the buoyant forces of water significantly better than most materials.

== Limitations ==
Although precast concrete offers numerous advantages, it also presents several limitations. Transportation of large and heavy components may increase logistical complexity and costs. Since elements are manufactured before arriving on site, modifications after fabrication are often difficult and expensive. The performance of precast structures also depends heavily on the quality of joints and connections, which require careful design and installation. In addition, specialized molds, manufacturing facilities, and lifting equipment may increase initial investment costs compared with some cast-in-place applications.

== Structures ==
=== Prestressed concrete ===
Prestressing is a technique of introducing stresses into a structural member during fabrication and/or construction to improve its strength and performance. This technique is often employed in concrete beams, columns, spandrels, single and double tees, wall panels, segmental bridge units, bulb-tee girders, I-beam girders, and others. Many projects find that prestressed concrete provides the lowest overall cost, considering production and lifetime maintenance.

=== Precast concrete sandwich wall (or insulated double-wall) panels ===
==== Origin ====
The precast concrete double-wall panel has been in use in Europe for decades. The original double-wall design consisted of two wythes of reinforced concrete separated by an interior void, held together with embedded steel trusses. With recent concerns about energy use, it is recognized that using steel trusses creates a "thermal bridge" that degrades thermal performance. Also, since steel does not have the same thermal expansion coefficient as concrete, as the wall heats and cools any steel that is not embedded in the concrete can create thermal stresses that cause cracking and spalling.

==== Development ====
To achieve better thermal performance, insulation was added in the void, and in many applications today the steel trusses have been replaced by composite (fibreglass, plastic, etc.) connection systems. These systems, which are specially developed for this purpose, also eliminate the differential thermal expansion problem.The best thermal performance is achieved when the insulation is continuous throughout the wall section, i.e., the wythes are thermally separated completely to the ends of the panel. Using continuous insulation and modern composite connection systems, R-values up to R-28.2 can be achieved. "Joints between precast wall panels are commonly sealed with elastomeric sealants, such as silyl modified polymers, to accommodate joint movement and provide weather resistance."

==== Characteristics ====
The overall thickness of sandwich wall panels in commercial applications is typically 8 inches, but their designs are often customized to the application. In a typical 8-inch wall panel the concrete wythes are each 2-3/8 inches thick), sandwiching 3-1/4 inches of high R-value insulating foam. The interior and exterior wythes of concrete are held together (through the insulation) with some form of connecting system that is able to provide the needed structural integrity. Sandwich wall panels can be fabricated to the length and width desired, within practical limits dictated by the fabrication system, the stresses of lifting and handling, and shipping constraints. Panels of 9-foot clear height are common, but heights up to 12 feet can be found.

The fabrication process for precast concrete sandwich wall panels allows them to be produced with finished surfaces on both sides. Such finishes can be very smooth, with the surfaces painted, stained, or left natural; for interior surfaces, the finish is comparable to drywall in smoothness and can be finished using the same prime and paint procedure as is common for conventional drywall construction. If desired, the concrete can be given an architectural finish, where the concrete itself is colored and/or textured. Colors and textures can provide the appearance of brick, stone, wood, or other patterns through the use of reusable formliners, or, in the most sophisticated applications, actual brick, stone, glass, or other materials can be cast into the concrete surface.

Window and door openings are cast into the walls at the manufacturing plant as part of the fabrication process. In many applications, electrical and telecommunications conduit and boxes are cast directly into the panels in the specified locations. In some applications, utilities, plumbing and heating components have also been cast into the panels to reduce on-site construction time. The unique aspects of these wall panels, while requiring some adjustment on the part of unfamiliar carpenters, electricians and plumbers, does not largely change the construction or maintenance processes.

==== Applications and benefits ====
Precast concrete sandwich wall panels have been used on virtually every type of building, including schools, office buildings, apartment buildings, townhouses, condominiums, hotels, motels, dormitories, and single-family homes. Although typically considered part of a building's enclosure or "envelope," they can be designed to also serve as part of the building's structural system, eliminating the need for beams and columns on the building perimeter. Besides their energy efficiency and aesthetic versatility, they also provide excellent noise attenuation, outstanding durability (resistant to rot, mold, etc.), and rapid construction.

In addition to the good insulation properties, sandwich panels require fewer work phases to complete. Compared to double-walls, for example, which have to be insulated and filled with concrete on site, sandwich panels require much less labor and scaffolding.

==== Precast Concrete Market ====
The precast concrete industry is primarily dominated by government-initiated projects for infrastructural development. However, these are also being extensively used for residential (low-rise and high-rise) and commercial constructions due to various advantages. The efficiency, durability, ease, cost effectiveness, and sustainable properties of these products have reduced the amount of time consumed in construction. The construction industry is a huge energy-consuming industry, and precast concrete products are and will continue to be more energy efficient than their counterparts. The wide range of designs, colours, and structural options that these products provide, also makes them a favourable choice for consumers.

== Regulations ==
Many state and federal transportation projects in the United States require precast concrete suppliers to be certified by either the Architectural Precast Association, National Precast Concrete Association or Precast Prestressed Concrete Institute.

== See also ==
- Cast in place concrete
- Million Programme
- Prestressed concrete
- Roll way
- Structural robustness
- Tilt up
