= Multistorey car park =

Building designed for car parking

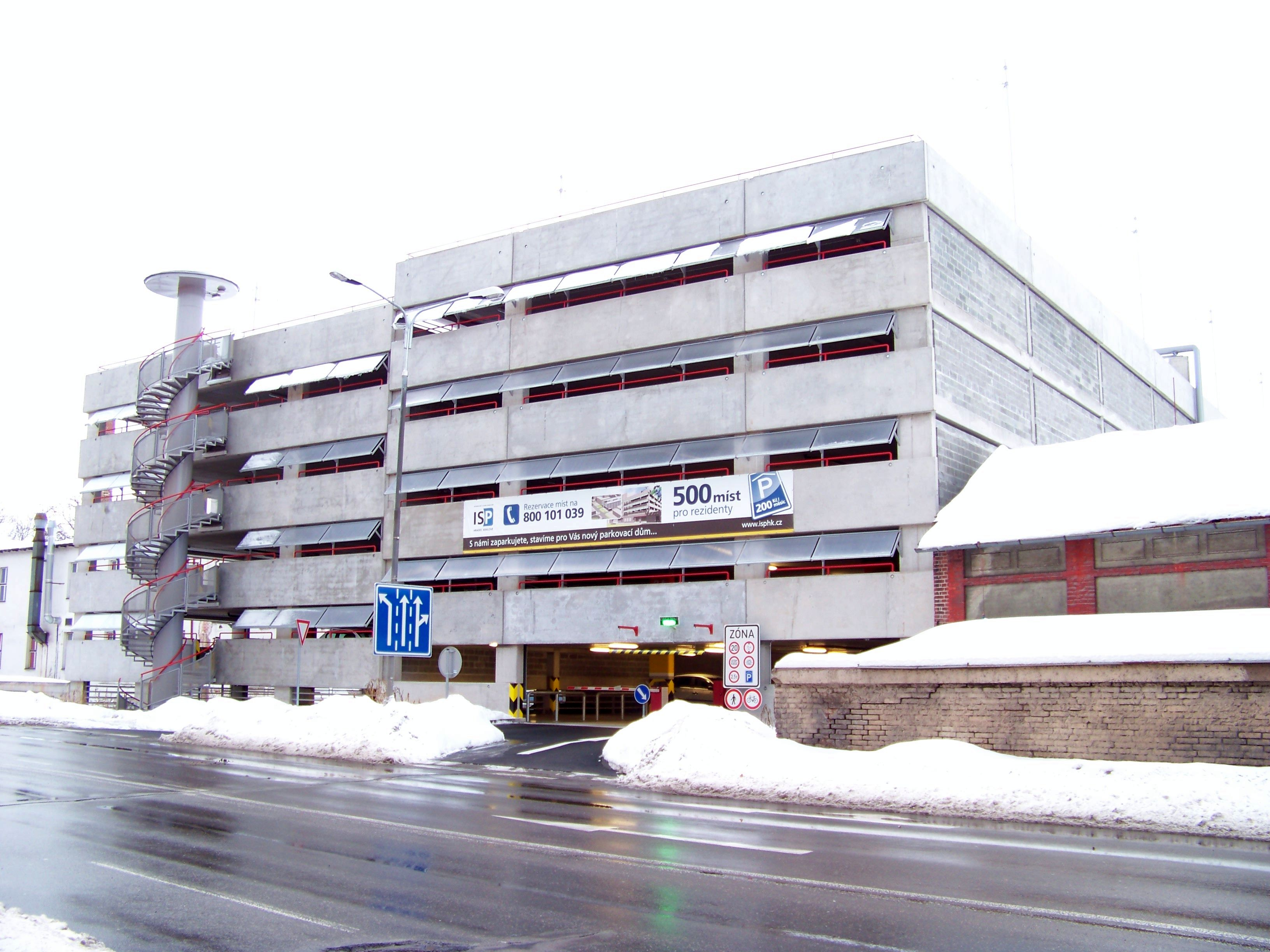
A multistorey car park in Hradec Králové, Czechia

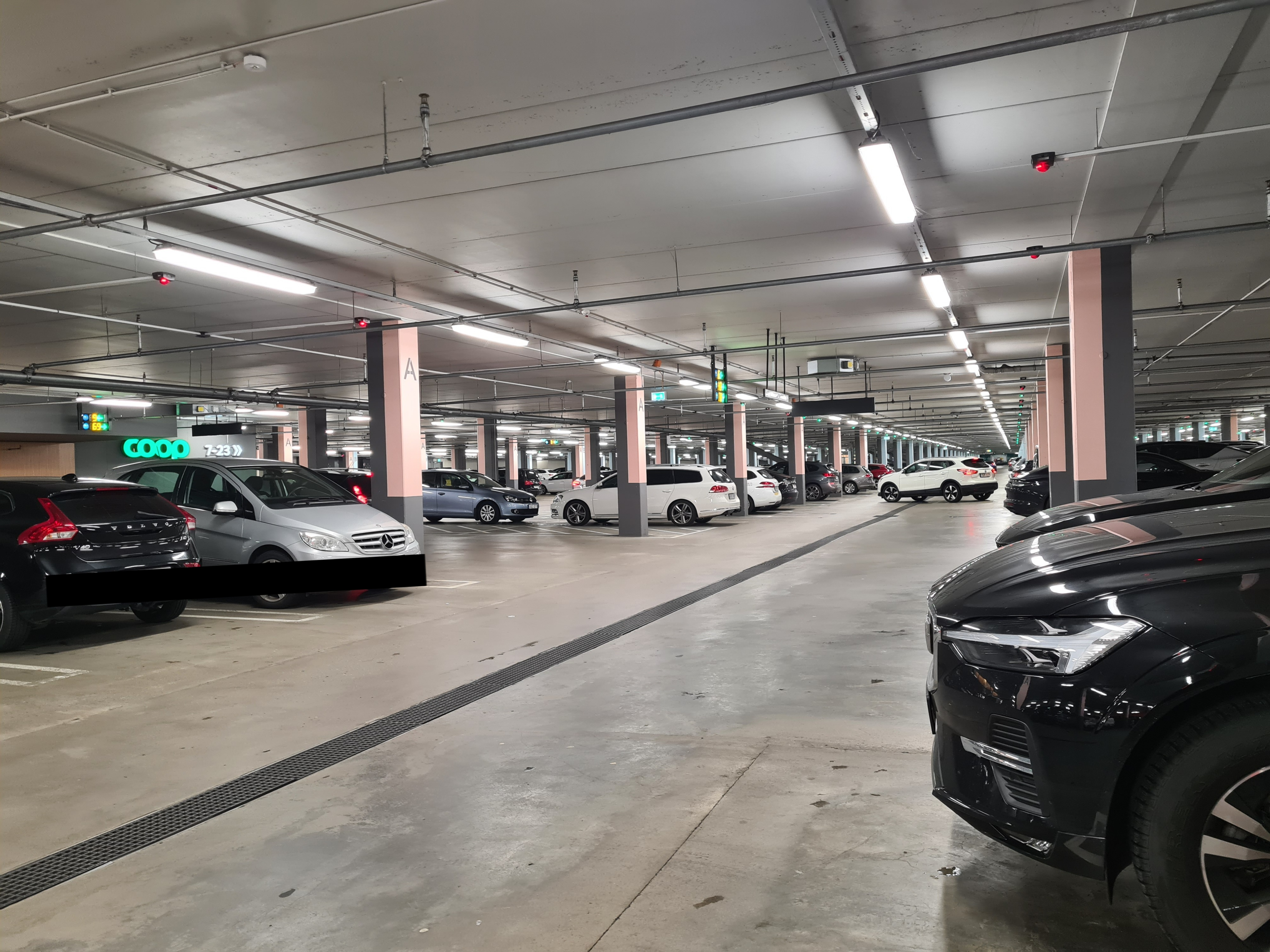
The interior of a shopping mall's parking garage in Kungälv, Sweden

A multistorey car park (Commonwealth English) or parking garage (American English), also called a multistorey, parking building, parking structure, parkade (Canadian and South African English), parking ramp, parking deck, or indoor parking, is a building designed for car, motorcycle, and bicycle parking in which parking takes place on more than one floor or level. The first known multistorey facility was built in London in 1901 and the first underground parking was built in Barcelona in 1904 (see history). The term multistorey (or multistory) is almost never used in the United States. Parking structures may be heated if they are enclosed.

Design of parking structures can add considerable cost for planning new developments, with costs in the United States around $28,000 per space and $56,000 per space for underground (excluding the cost of land), and can be required by cities in parking mandates for new buildings. Some cities such as London have abolished previously enacted minimum parking requirements. Minimum parking requirements are a hallmark of zoning and planning codes for municipalities in the US. (States do not prescribe parking requirements, while counties and cities can).

== History ==
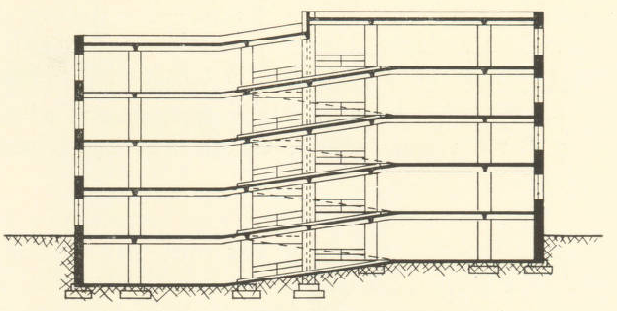
A circa 1929 drawing shows a Riemann surface

The earliest known multi-storey car park was opened in May 1901 by City & Suburban Electric Carriage Company at 6 Denman Street, central London. The location had space for 100 vehicles over seven floors, totalling 19,000 square feet (1,800 m^{2}). The same company opened a second location in 1902 for 230 vehicles. The company specialized in the sale, storage, valeting, and on-demand delivery of electric vehicles that could travel about 40 miles (65 km) and had a top speed of 20 miles per hour (32 km/h).

The earliest known parking garage in the United States was built in 1918 for the Hotel La Salle at 215 West Washington Street in the West Loop area of downtown Chicago, Illinois. It was designed by Holabird and Roche. The Hotel La Salle was demolished in 1976, but the parking structure remained because it had been designated as preliminary landmark status and the structure was several blocks from the hotel. It was demolished in 2005 after failing to receive landmark status from the city of Chicago. A 49-storey apartment tower, 215 West, has taken its place, also featuring a parking garage. When the Capital Garage in Washington, D.C. was built in 1927, it was reportedly the largest parking structure of its kind in the country. It was imploded in 1974.

== Design ==
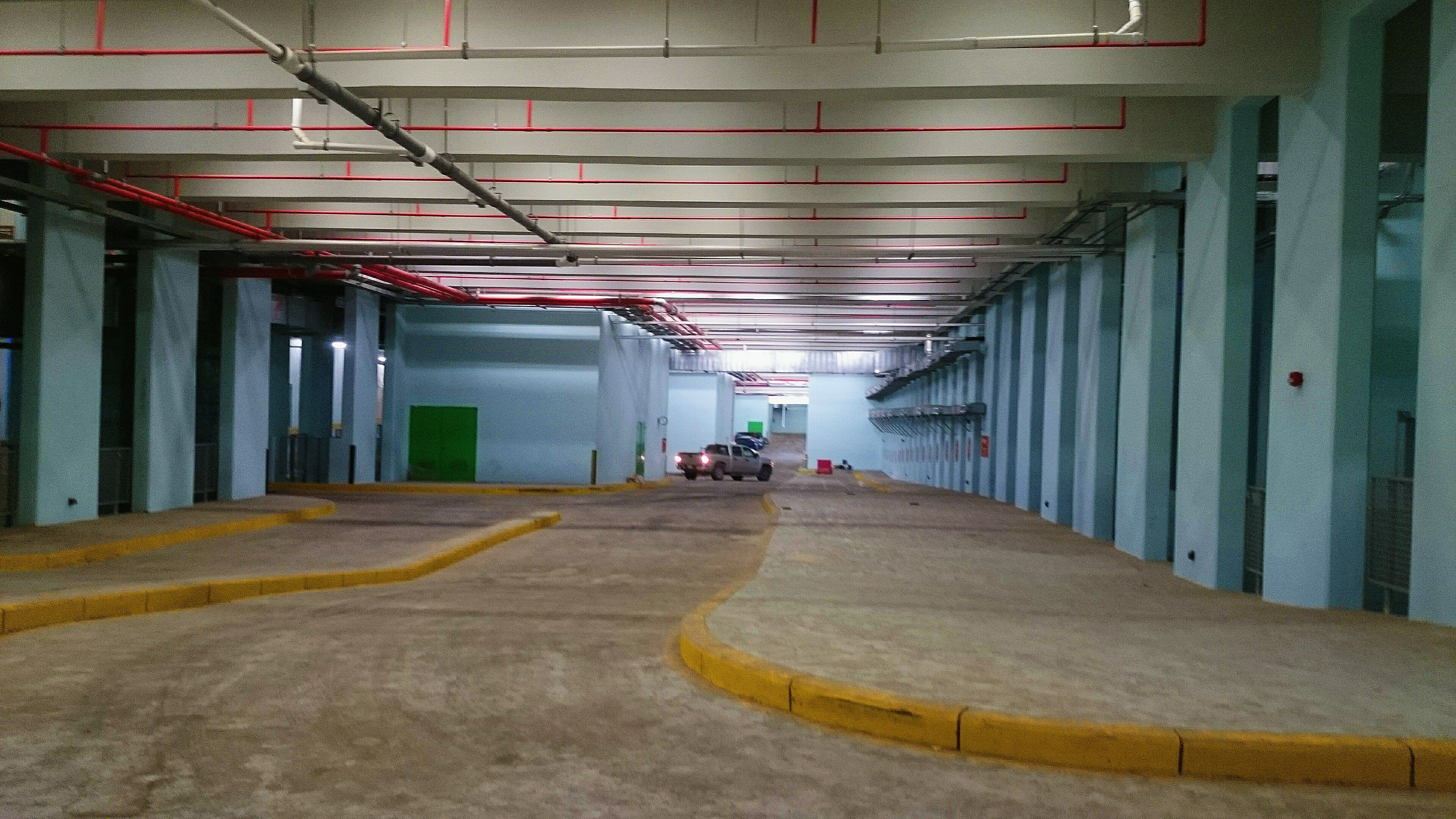
Basement parking

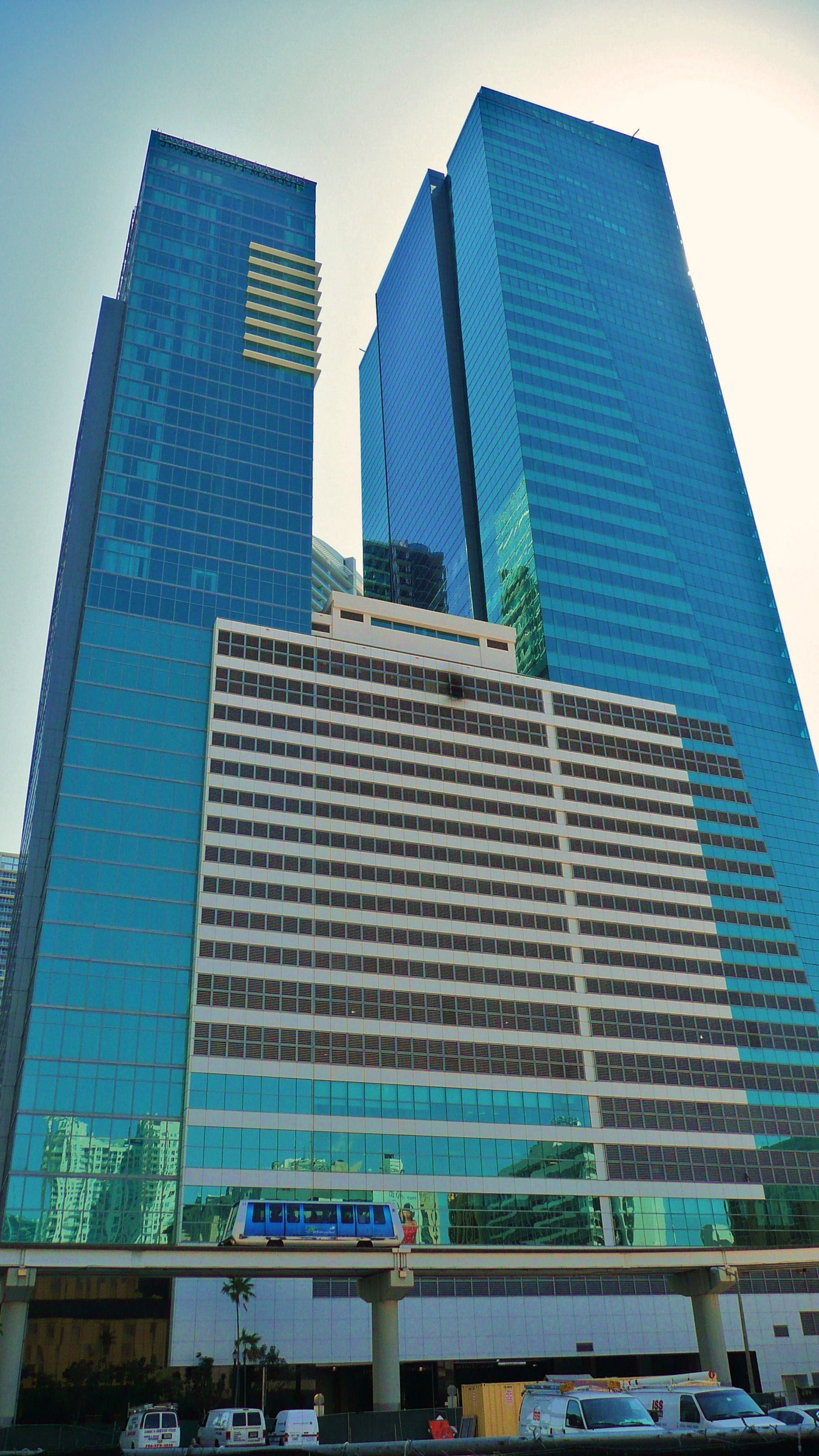
A large, mostly enclosed multi-storey car park forms the base or "pedestal" of two connected high rises. At nearly 20 stories and over 200 feet (61 m), it is an exceptionally large car park that comprises a significant portion of the building.

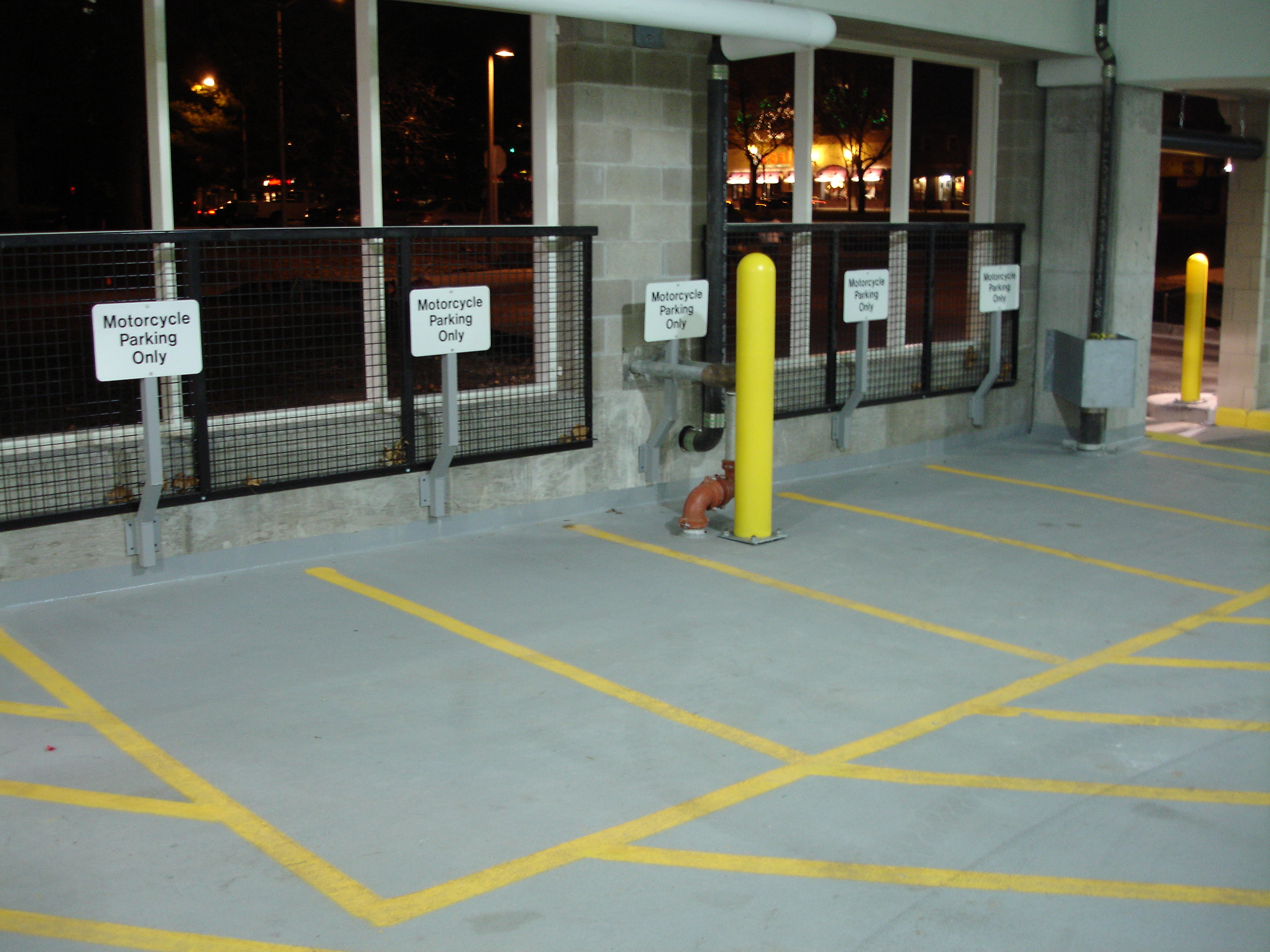
Motorcycle parking inside a multi-storey car park

The movement of vehicles between floors can take place by means of:

- interior inclined parking ramps and express ramps without parking – common
- interior circular or helical express ramps
- exterior ramps – which may take the form of a circular or helical ramp
- vehicle lifts (or elevators) – the least common
- automated robot systems – combination of ramp and elevator

Where the car park is built on sloping land, it may be split-level or have sloped parking.

Many parking structures are independent buildings dedicated exclusively to that use. The design loads for car parks are often less than the office building they serve (50 pounds per square foot (2.4 kPa) versus 80–100 psf (3.8–4.8 kPa)), leading to long floor spans of 55–65 feet (17–20 m) that permit cars to park in rows without supporting columns in between [called long span]. Podium parking below high-rise and mid-rise buildings are often short-span 25–30 feet (7.6–9.1 m) clear between columns, since office/residential/retail floors above require more support [100 psf (4.8 kPa) per International Building Code]. Columns in short -span structures obstruct row based parking spaces and will be less efficient than long-span designs; parking efficiency is measured in cars per level square footage [car count/level area]. Common structural systems in the United States for long-span structures are prestressed concrete double-tee floor systems, post-tensioned cast-in-place concrete floor systems or short-span podium parking with post-tensioned slabs and drop panels [drop heads. Steel embeds or thicker slabs can eliminate the need for drop panels, providing higher clearances for higher profile vehicles.]

In recent times, parking structures built to serve residential and some business properties have been built as part of a larger building, often underground as part of the basement, such as the parking lot at the Atlantic Station redevelopment in Atlanta. This saves land for other uses (as opposed surface parking), is cheaper and more practical in most cases than a separate structure, and is hidden from view. It protects customers and their cars from weather such as rain, snow, or hot summer sunshine that raises a vehicle's interior temperature to extremely high levels. Underground parking of only two levels was considered an innovative concept in 1964, when developer Louis Lesser developed a two-level underground parking structure under six 10-storey high-rise residential halls at California State University, Los Angeles, which lacked space for horizontal expansion in the 176-acre (0.71 km^{2}) university. The simple two-level parking structure was considered unusual enough in 1964 that a separate newspaper section entitled "Parking Underground" described the parking lot as an innovative "concept" and as "subterranean spaces". In Toronto, a 2,400 space underground parking structure below Nathan Phillips Square is one of the world's largest.

Parking which serve shopping centers can be built adjacent to the center for easier access at each floor between shops and parking. One example is Mall of America in Bloomington, Minnesota, USA, which has two large parking lots attached to the building, at the eastern and western ends. A common position for parking within shopping centers in the UK is on the roof, around the various utility systems, enabling customers to take lifts straight down into the center. Examples of such are The Oracle in Reading and Festival Place in Basingstoke. Parking garages without mixed use can provide excellent uses for the Roof area: The Grove Parking Garage is the site for movies on its 8th level roof, The Grand Prix of Long Beach, California can be viewed from the Roof level of The Aquarium of the Pacific Parking Garage and The Pike Parking Garage (opposite the Queensway Structure) were built with a thickened post-tensioned roof slab to accommodate crowds of people.

These parking structures often have low ceiling clearances, typically 7 ft 2 in (2.18 m) and 8 ft 4 in (2.54 m) for accessible parking, which restrict access by full-size vans and other large vehicles. On 15 December 2013, a man was killed during a robbery in the parking garage at The Mall at Short Hills in Millburn, New Jersey. The paramedics responding to the shooting were delayed because their ambulance was too large to enter the structure.

In the United States, costs for parking garages are estimated to cost between $25,000 per space, with underground parking costing around $35,000 per space.

=== Structural integrity ===
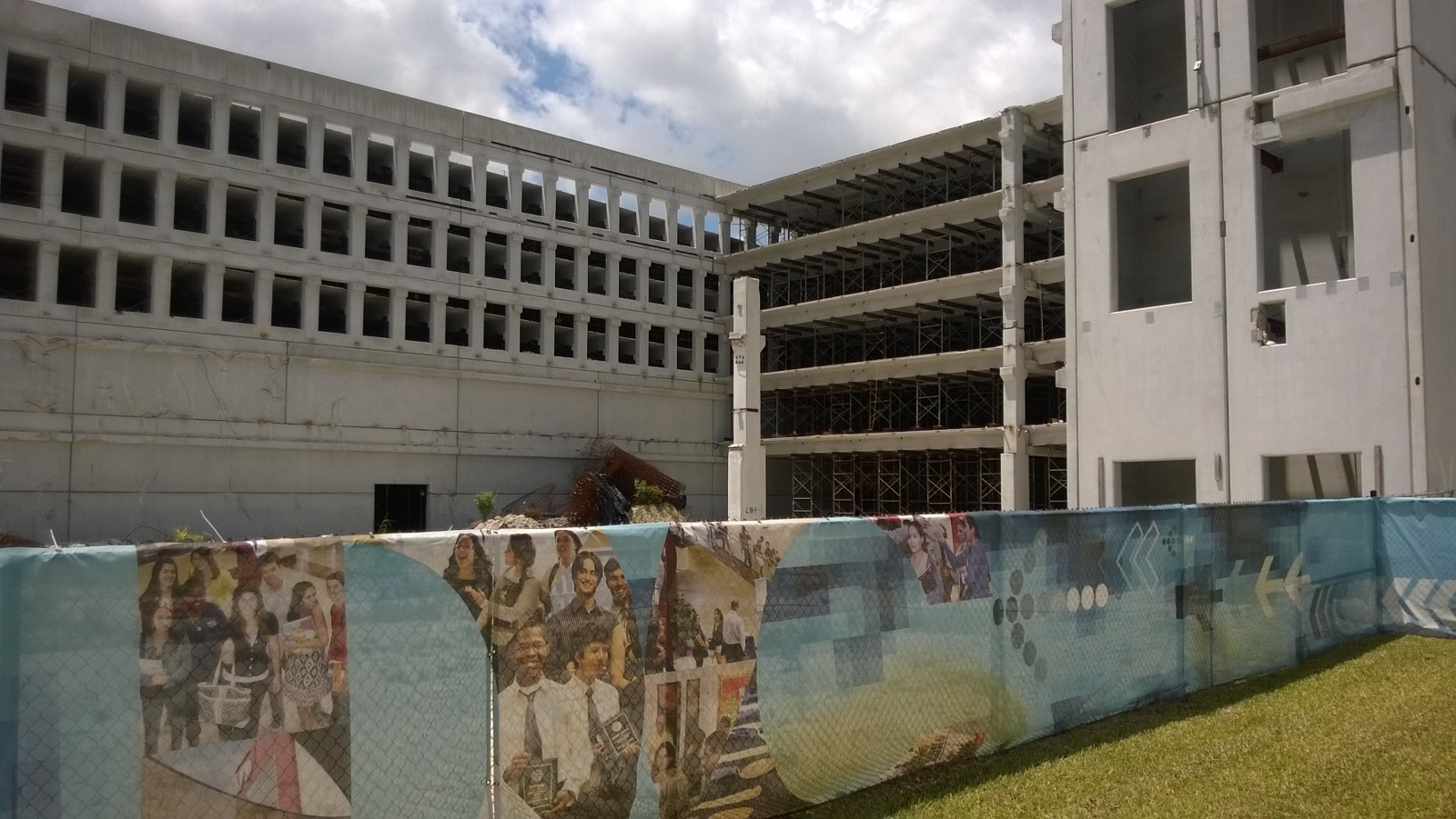
Shuttered construction site of multistorey car park nearly two years after partial structural failure

Parking structures are subjected to the heavy and shifting loads of moving vehicles, and must bear the associated physical stresses. Expansion joints are used between sections not only for thermal expansion but to accommodate the flexing of the structure's sections due to vehicle traffic. Parking structures are generally not subject to building inspections after being checked for their initial occupancy permit. Seismic retrofits can be applied where earthquakes are an issue.

Some parking structures have partly collapsed, either during construction or years later. In July 2009, a fourth-floor section failed at the Centergy building in midtown Atlanta, pancaking down and destroying more than 30 vehicles but injuring no-one. In December 2007, a car crashed into the wall of the deck at the SouthPark Mall in Charlotte, North Carolina, weakening it and causing a small collapse which destroyed two cars below. On the same day, one under construction in Jacksonville, Florida collapsed as concrete was being poured on the sixth floor.

In November 2008, the sudden collapse of the middle level of a deck in Montreal was preceded by warning signs some weeks before, including cracks and water leaks.

In June 2012, the Algo Centre Mall's rooftop parking deck collapsed into the building, crashing through the upper level lottery kiosk adjacent to the food court and escalators to the ground floor below, killing two people.

In October 2012, four people were killed and nine more injured when a parking structure under construction at a campus of Miami-Dade College in Florida collapsed, purportedly due to an unfinished column.

The Surfside condominium's main building's collapse that killed ninety-eight people was likely caused by the failure of the long-term degradation of reinforced concrete structural support in the basement-level parking garage.

=== Precast parking structures ===
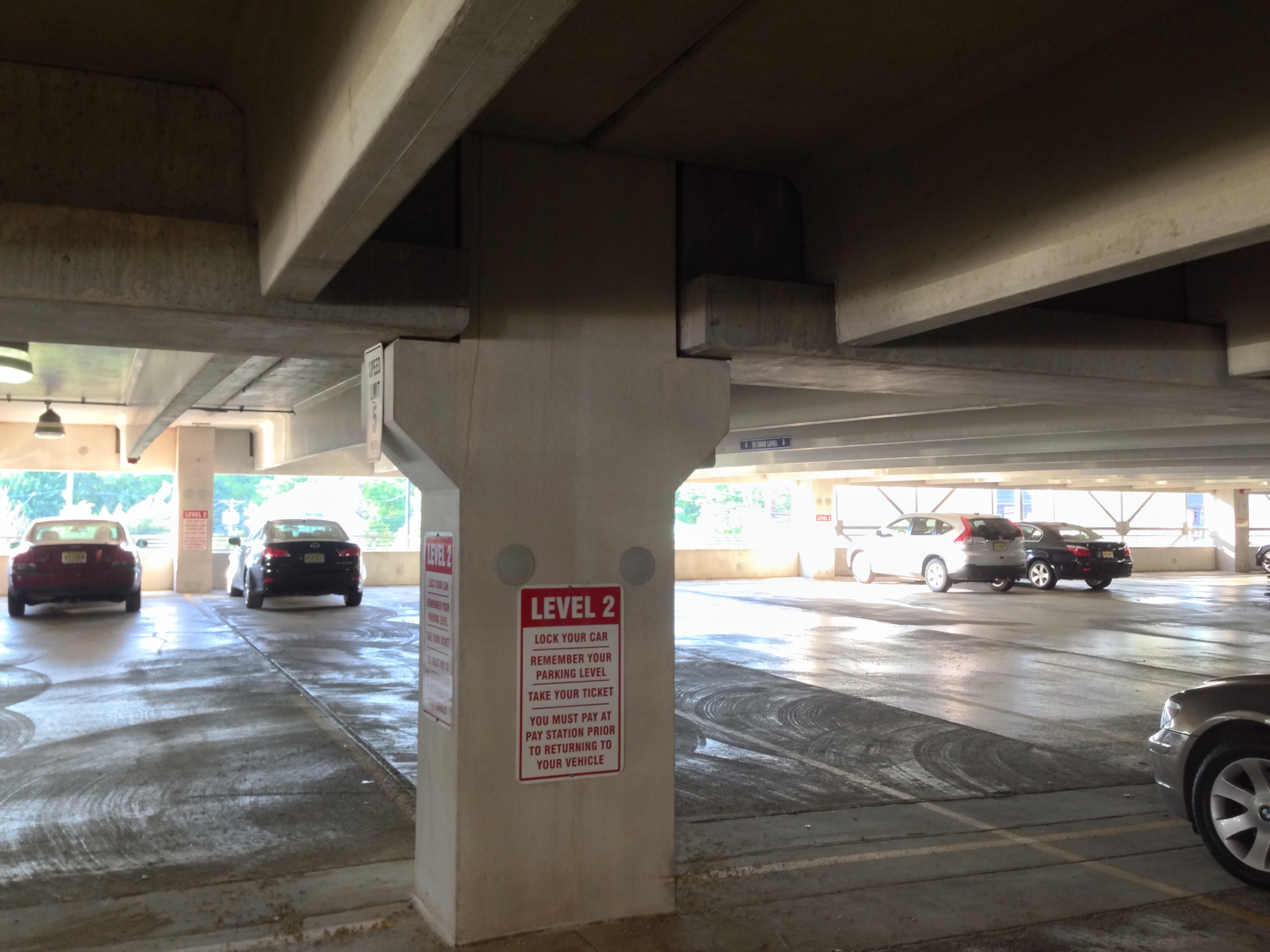
Precast parking structure showing an interior column, girders and double-tee structural floors. The two gray circles are covers to close the lifting anchor holes.

As multi-storey car parks have become more common since the middle of the twentieth century, many constructions of such structures have been using precast concrete to reduce the construction time. The design involves putting parking structure parts together. The parts of precast concrete include multi-storey structural wall panels, interior and exterior columns, structural floors, girders, wall panels, stairs, and slabs. The precast concrete parts are transported using flatbed semi-trailers to the sites. The structural floor modules may need to be laid tilted during the transportation in order to cover as large floor area as possible while they can be easily transported on the roadways. The modules are lifted using precast concrete lifting anchor systems at the sites for assembly. Decorations may include using of covers to close the holes in the precast concrete that contains the lifting anchors, and installing facades to the exterior of the structures.

In modern construction of the precast modules, there are other features to improve the strength of the structure. An example is to use prestressed strands on post-tensioned concrete for the construction of the shear walls. Another example is the use of carbon-fiber-reinforced polymer to replace steel wire mesh to lighten the load and yield more corrosion resistance especially for the cold-climate areas which use salt for melting snow.

=== Architectural value ===
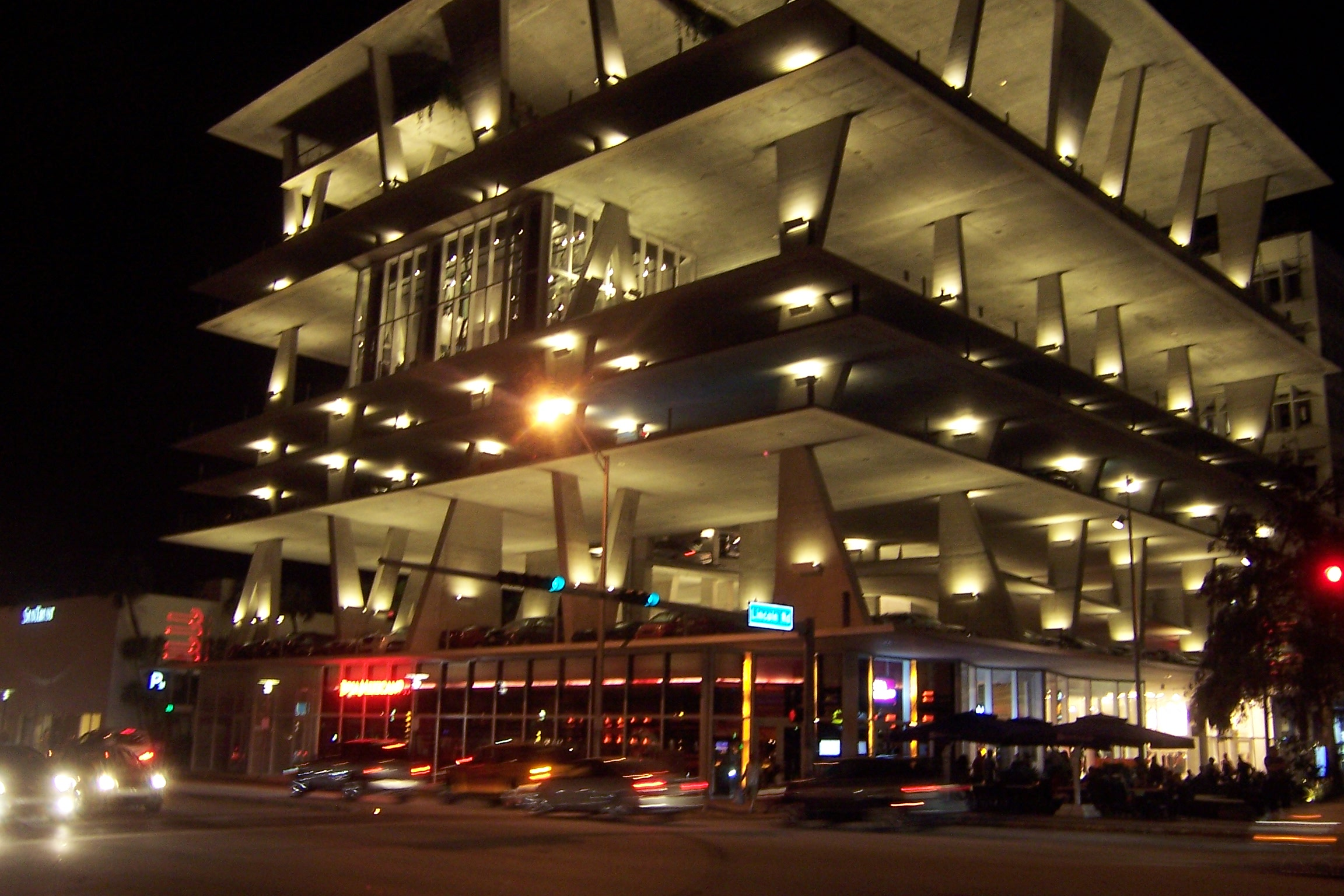
The 1111 Lincoln Road parking garage

These structures are not usually known for their architectural value. As Architectural Record has noted, "In the Pantheon of Building Types, the parking garage lurks somewhere in the vicinity of prisons and toll plazas." The New York Times has labelled parking structures as "the grim afterthought of American design".

A handful of structures have received considerable praise for their design, including

- 1111 Lincoln Road, in the South Beach section of Miami Beach, Florida and designed by the internationally known Swiss architectural firm of Herzog & de Meuron.
- The Brutalist Preston bus station in the United Kingdom, which incorporates a multistorey car park
- Castle Terrace Car Park in Edinburgh, United Kingdom
- In the United States, several have been listed on the National Register of Historic Places, including Boston's North Terminal Garage. In more recent developments, Queensway Bay Parking Garage, Long Beach CA, has received awards for it unique facade in 1992, Designed by International Parking Design and built by Bomel Construction Company Inc.

== Nomenclature ==
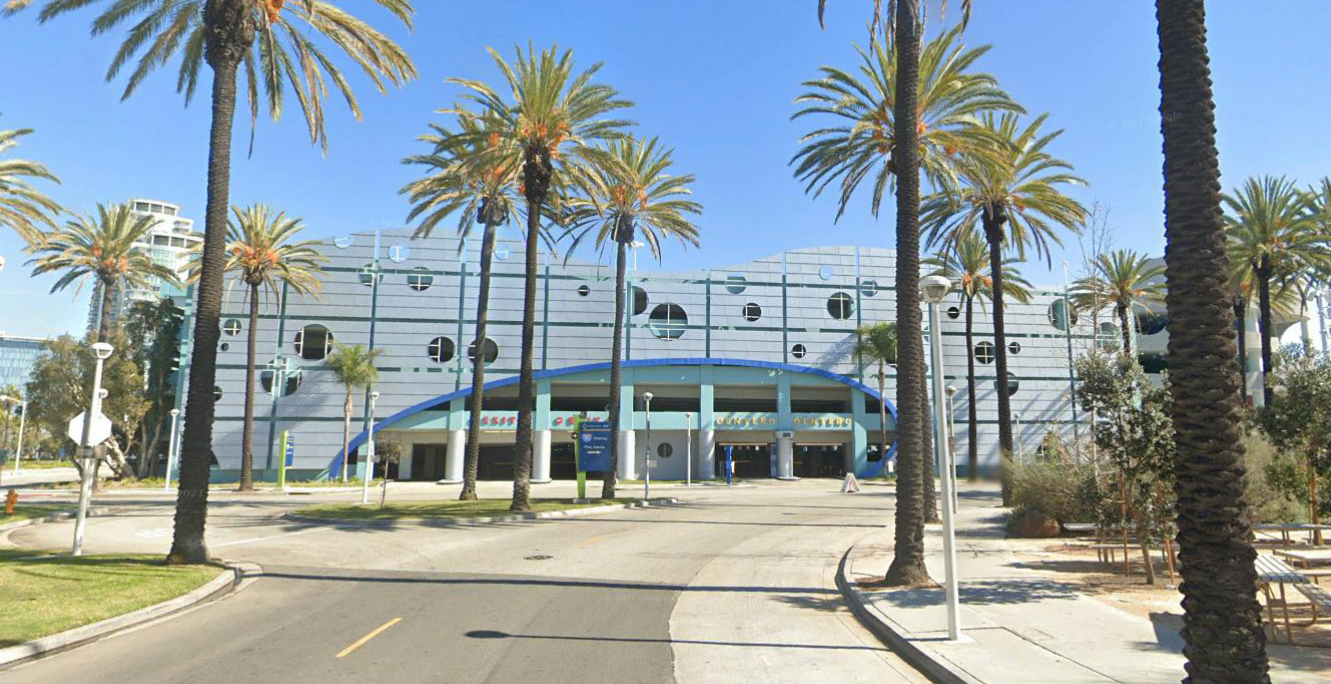
Entrance to the parking garage of the Aquarium of the Pacific

The term multistorey car park (often abbreviated to multistorey or multistory) is used in the United Kingdom, Hong Kong, and many Commonwealth of Nations countries, and it is nowadays most commonly spelled without a hyphen. In the United States, the term parking structure is used, especially when it is necessary to distinguish such a structure from the "garage" connected with a house. In some places in North America, "parking garage" refers only to an indoor, often underground, structure. Outdoor, multi-level parking facilities are referred to by a number of regional terms:

- Parking garage is used, to varying degrees, throughout the U.S. and Canada, often referring to underground parking, and designed professionally by Structural Engineers and Architects;
- Parking structure is used worldwide, and synonymously with "parking garage".
- Parking deck is used mostly in the Southern United States.
- Parking ramp is used in the upper Midwest, especially Minnesota and Wisconsin, and has been observed as far east as Buffalo, New York.
- Parkade is widely used in Western Canada and South Africa.
- Parking building is used in New Zealand.

Architects and structural engineers in the USA are likely to call it a parking structure since their work is all about structures and since that term is the vernacular in the United States. When constructed as the base of a high-rise, it is sometimes called a parking podium. United States building codes use the term open parking garage to refer to a structure designed for car storage that has openings along at least 40% of the perimeter, as opposed to an enclosed parking garage that requires mechanical ventilation. Natural or mechanical ventilation provides fresh air flow to disperse car exhaust in normal conditions, or hot gas and smoke in case of fire.

Typically parking consultants in the UK describe the number of car park floors in terms of "G+x". G stands for ground and x for the number of floors above ground. For example, G+5 is a multi-storey car park structure with a ground floor and 5 floors above that, i.e. a total of 6 floors. The preceding does not apply to the United States where B+x refers to basement levels ascending in number x while descending in elevation, L1 or ground level [unlike European standards where ground level is below level 1] with added levels as L2, L3, L4, etc.

== Construction types ==
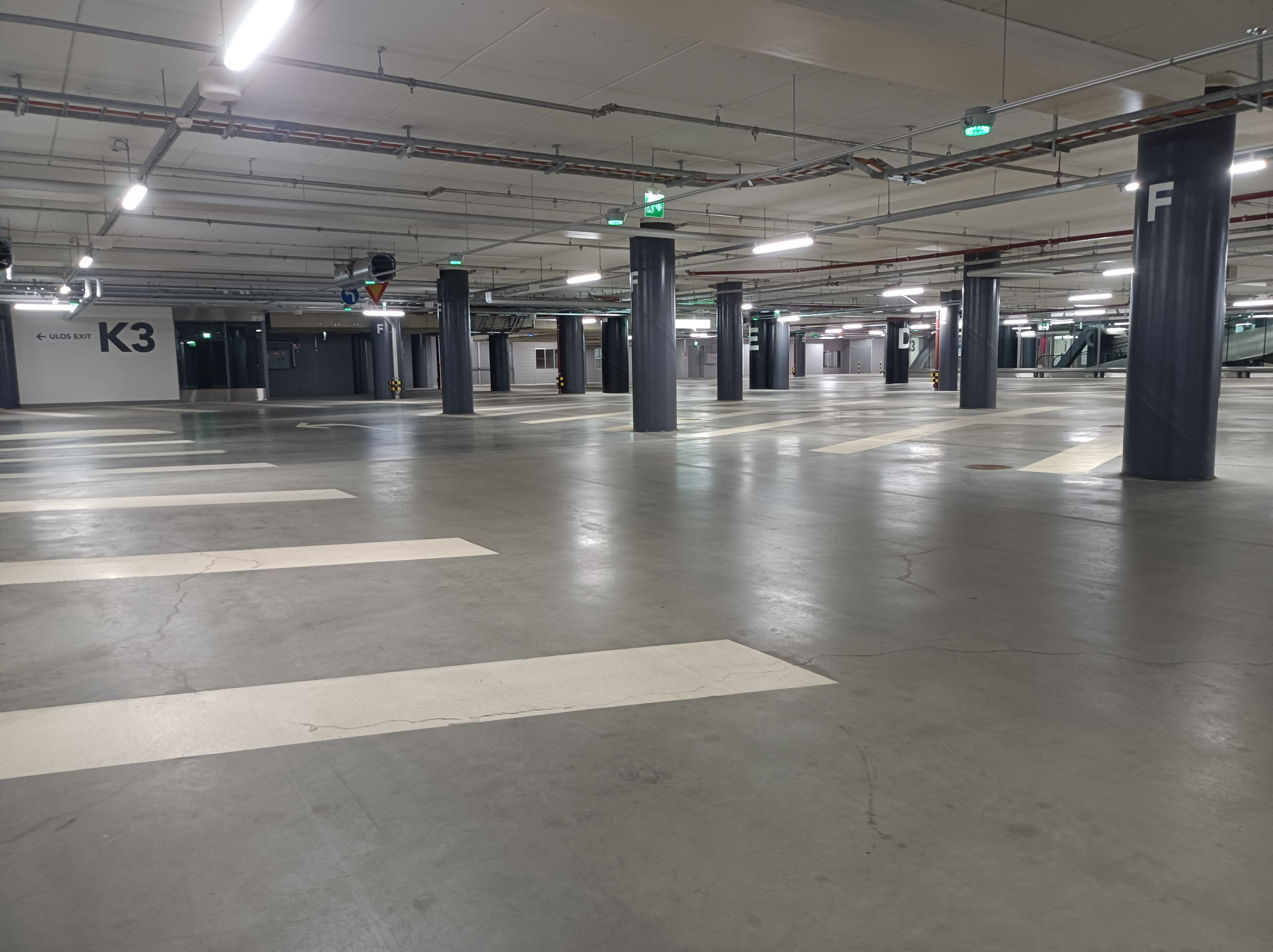
A parking garage at REDI shopping centre in Kalasatama, Helsinki, Finland

- Concrete
- Steel structure
- Automated (mechanical)

=== Steel structure ===
Structure car parks are car parks made of structural steel components connected to each other to carry the loads and provide full structural rigidity.

Steel is a high-strength material requiring less material than other types of structures like concrete and timber. Steel construction features:

- Cost savings: inexpensive to manufacture and erect, and requires less maintenance than traditional building methods.
- Speed: Allows construction or prefabrication off-site with rapid installation on-site. Some suppliers claim construction in days.
- Durability: Suppliers claim 50-plus years lifespan.
- Removability: Steel car park structure could be designed to be removed at a later date.
- Expandability: Steel car park structures can be expanded easily at a later date.
- Creativity: Steel allows for long column-free spans.

The ceiling slab of the steel structure car park is typically made of composite material such as corrugated steel sheets and concrete. The surface of the first-floor parking can be left bare or covered with epoxy or tarmac.

=== Foundationless and modular ===
Demand, steel features, and innovation have led to the development of a foundationless, modular, removable steel car park structure.

Parking demand often grows quickly, significantly and sometimes unexpectedly. Modular steel car parks could be the proper solution if the surface area available is not sufficient and can be expanded upward, or whenever it is not feasible to build up a multi-storey parking. The development of the building concept of modular car parks came about by using the modular assembling method of vertical and horizontal elements (such as columns and beams) Modular car park structures are versatile and can be built in phases or in different sizes and shape. The solution makes it possible to develop a parking structure even in case of particular conditions or constraints, such as archaeological sites or city centres, because it allows:

- To virtually double the parking surface without leaving any footprint on the ground, as no settlement for excavations or traditional foundations is needed;
- To double the parking surface by means of a light steel single-deck car park system.
- Prefab modular components of the system make each project versatile and suitable for both large and small sized areas.

These parking structures are generally demountable and can be relocated to avoid making the choice of converting a surface to parking area irrevocably. They could be used as permanent structures or are conceived as temporary parking facilities for temporary parking demand needs. A number of parking decks have been demounted after a few years – to make room for the development of a permanent structure – and relocated to respond to local parking demand.

== Automated parking ==
The earliest use of an automated parking system (APS) was in Paris in 1905 at the Garage Rue de Ponthieu. The APS consisted of a groundbreaking multi-storey concrete structure with an internal elevator to transport cars to upper levels where attendants parked the cars. A 1931 Popular Mechanics article speculated about design for an underground garage where the car is taken to a parking area by a conveyor and then an elevator to shuttles mounted on rails.

The total cost of ownership of automated parking needs to be carefully considered. The actual cost of construction of automated car parks is typically higher than conventional car park structures, however, this can be offset by the higher space efficiency including reduced excavation waste from minimized footprints. The cost of the mechanical equipment needed to transport the cars needs to be added to the building cost. In addition, operation and maintenance costs of the mechanical equipment need to be added in order to determine the total cost of ownership. Other costs could be saved, for example, there is no need for an energy-intensive ventilating system, since cars are not driven inside and human cashiers or security personnel may not be needed. For naturally ventilated car parks structures, the ventilation equipment is not needed.

Automated car parks rely on similar technology to that used for mechanical handling and document retrieval. The driver leaves the car in an entrance module, and it is then transported to a parking slot by a robotic trolley. For the driver, the process of parking is reduced to leaving the car inside an entrance module.

At peak periods a wait may occur before entering or leaving, because loading passengers and luggage occurs at the entrance and exit rather than at the parking stall. This loading blocks the entrance or exit from being available to others. It is generally not recommended to use automated car parks for high peak hour volume facilities.

Additional factors that need to be taken into consideration are:

- Fear of breakdowns (How does the user get the car back)
- Maintenance contracts needed with suppliers

Automotive factories and car dealerships often use automated car parks to store inventory, which makes best use of space if they operate in urban areas, plus the car park may be decorated to promote the brand. For instance at the Autostadt there are two 60-metre (200 ft) tall glass silos (AutoTürme) used as storage for new Volkswagens. The two towers are connected to the Volkswagen factory by a 700-metre (2,300 ft) tunnel. When cars arrive at the towers they are carried up at a speed of 1.5 metres per second (4.9 ft/s). The render for the Autostadt shows 6 towers. When purchasing a car from Volkswagen (the main brand only, not the sub-brands) in select European countries, it is optional if the customer wants it delivered to the dealership where it was bought or if the customer wants to travel to Autostadt to pick it up. If the latter is chosen, the Autostadt supplies the customer with free entrance, meal tickets and a variety of events building up to the point where the customer can follow on screen as the automatic elevator picks up the selected car in one of the silos. The car is then transported out to the customer without having driven a single meter, and the odometer is thus on "0".

Automated car parks have been popular for multistorey residential buildings in New York City and Paris. In Toronto, automated car parks are gradually catching in the downtown core condominium developments since the 2010s, due to developers having to meet city-mandated minimum parking space requirements while building on increasingly smaller lots.

== Other technologies ==
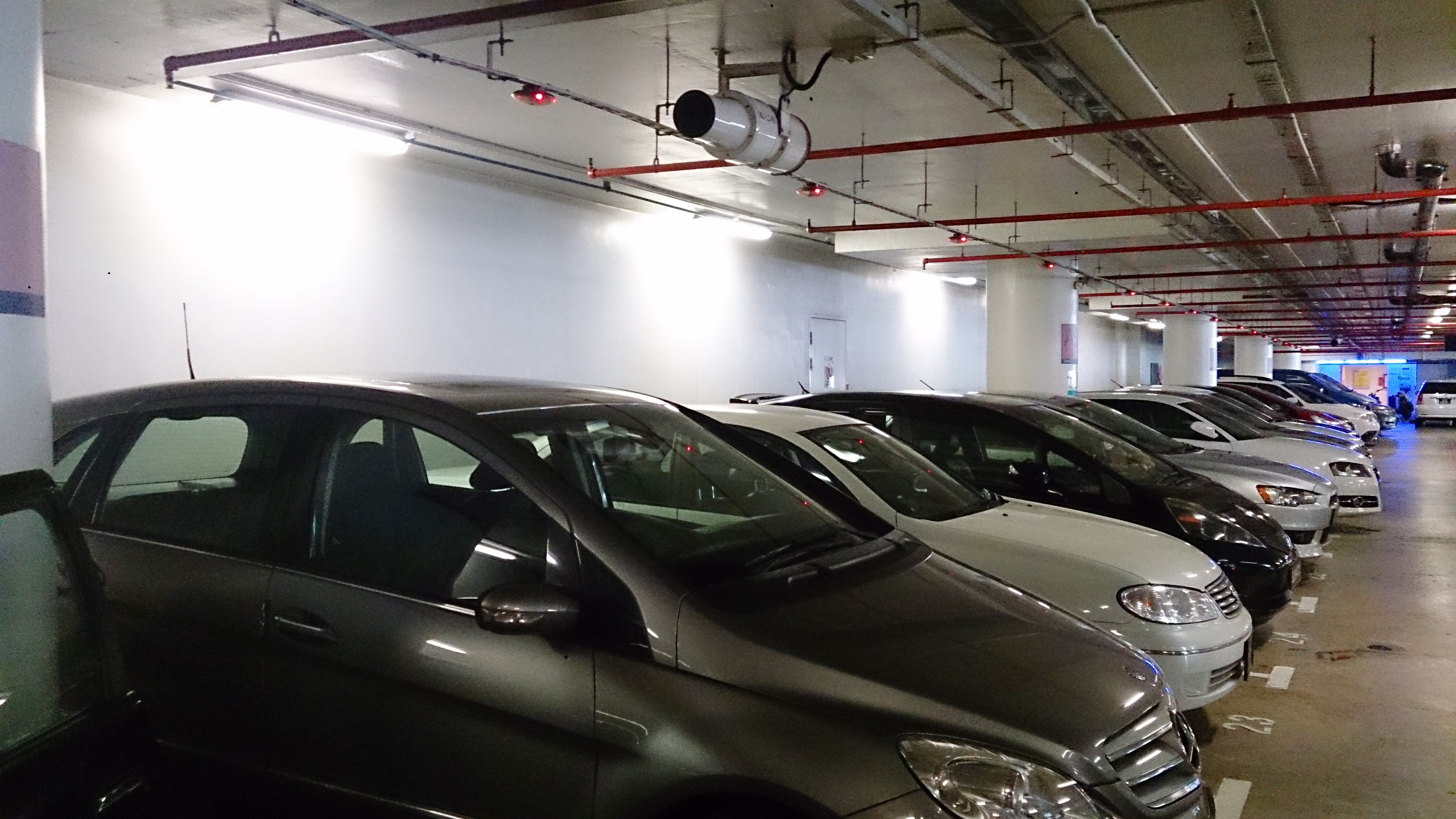
Ultrasonic sensors above each lot in this indoor car park determine if a car has already taken the lot and indicate using LEDs; and some can send a Bluetooth or SMS message with the parking space number or code.

Modern car parks utilize a variety of technologies to help motorists find unoccupied parking spaces, car location when returning to the vehicle and improve their experience. These include adaptive lighting, sensors and parking space LED indicators (red for occupied, green for available and blue is reserved for the disabled; above every parking space), indoor positioning system (IPS), including QR code, and mobile payment options. The Santa Monica Place shopping mall in California has cameras on each stall that can help count the lot occupancy and find lost cars.

Online booking technology service providers have been created to help drivers find long-term parking in an automated manner, while also providing significant savings for those who book parking spaces ahead of time. They use real-time inventory management checking technology to display car parks with availability, sorted by price and distance from the airport.

Other recent developments in technology include Vehicles Detection and Count Systems, Point of Sale & Revenue Control Systems, Traffic & Capacity Monitoring Systems, Valet Parking Point of Sale, Management & Revenue Control Systems. These systems help in way finding for parking clients with space availability shown at every turn, space monitoring using retrofit wifi transmitters in each space to update the space availability signs and to alert parking management of bottle necks and intervention measures. Revenue Control, Capacity Management, and Valet Point of Sale is a major issue for Office and Retail parking management and is also a means of parking management intervention, where website update the status of all of these issues for exclusive use by management. Irvine Spectrum Center, Irvine CA, with 3 parking structures, uses all of these systems The City of Santa Monica uses Traffic and Capacity Monitoring with its 30 parking structures. Disneyland, in Anaheim CA uses most of these hi-tech solutions on its 8 garages.

=== Multistorey parking ship ===
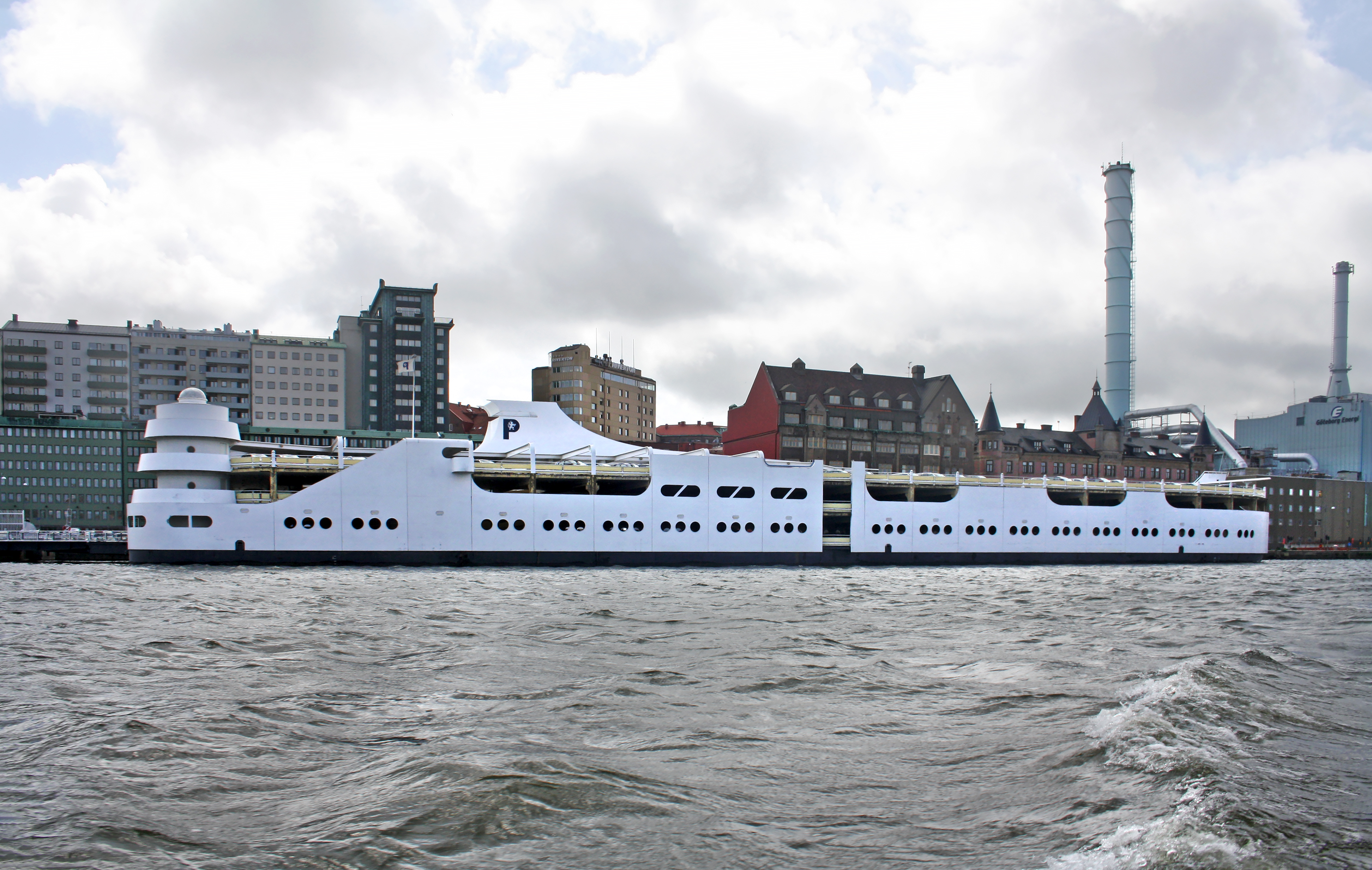
P-Arken as seen from water

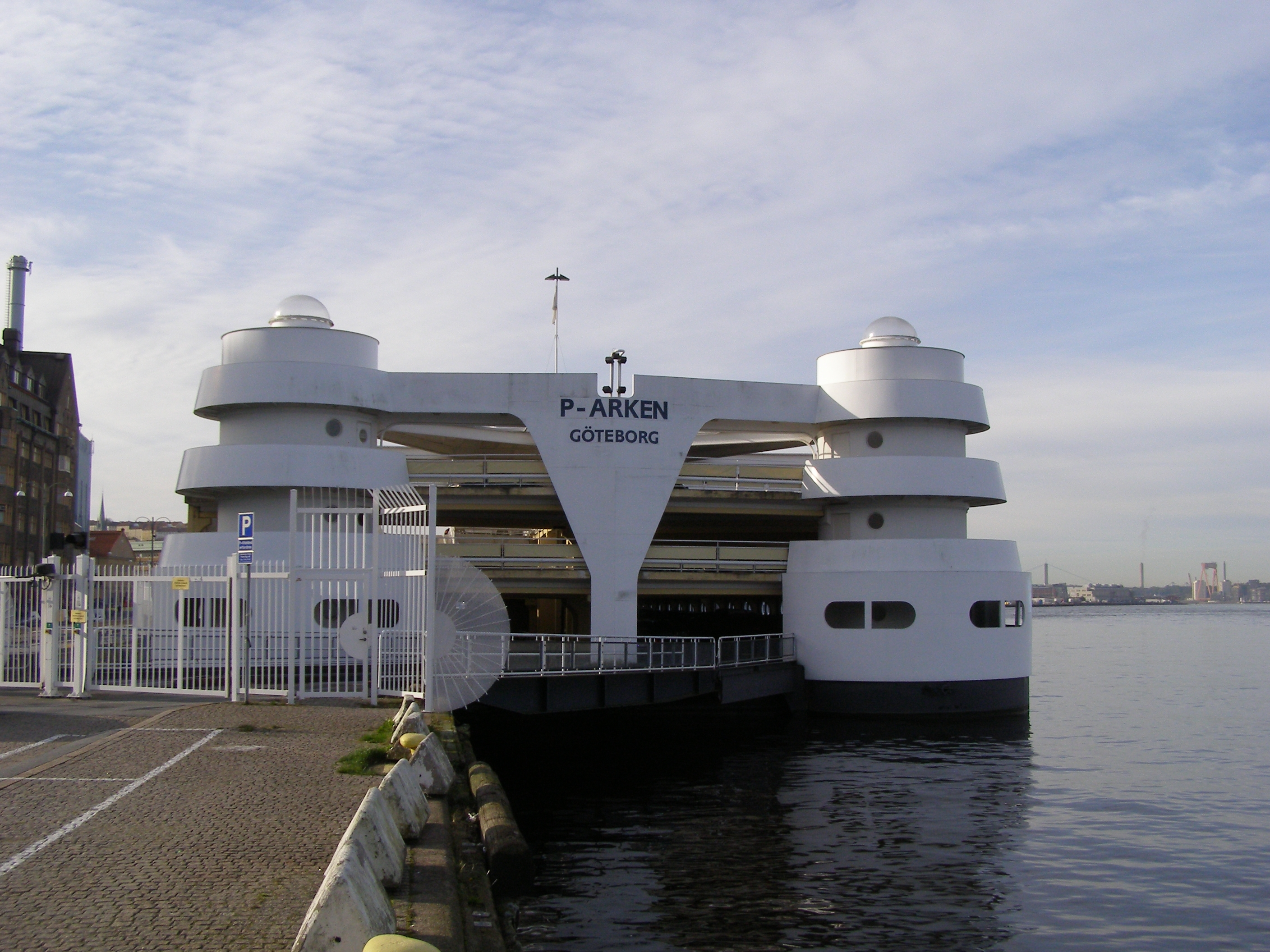
P-Arken as seen from land

In 1991, a 1975 marine vessel was transformed into a floating pontoon multi-storey car parking facility. The ship was given the new name P-Arken (a pun on the words park and ark) and it is permanently moored in Gothenburg's harbour Lilla Bommen near Skeppsbron.

In November 2019, a fully-clad parking barge for automobiles was patented in the United States. Its angular sides are designed to protect against driving wind, rain, and debris.

== Education and research ==
In October 2009, the National Building Museum opened an exhibition solely devoted to the study of parking garages and their impact on the built environment. This exhibition, titled House of Cars: Innovation and the Parking Garage, was on view until 11 July 2010.

== See also ==
- Arcade, "parkade" is a portmanteau or parking and arcade due to the architectural similarity.
- Auto Stacker
- Autostadt
- Automatic parking
- Automated parking system
- Automatic vehicle location
- Car condo
- Car parking system
- Parking guidance and information
- Trinity Square, Gateshead
