= Deck (bridge) =

Surface of a bridge

The various parts of a truss bridge

A deck is the surface of a bridge. A structural element of its superstructure, it may be constructed of concrete, steel, open grating, or wood. Sometimes the deck is covered by a railroad bed and track, asphalt concrete, or other form of pavement for ease of vehicle crossing. A concrete deck may be an integral part of the bridge structure (T-beam or double tee structure) or it may be supported with I-beams or steel girders.

When a bridge deck is installed in a through truss, it is sometimes called a floor system. A suspended bridge deck will be suspended from the main structural elements on a suspension or arch bridge. On some bridges, such as a tied-arch or a cable-stayed, the deck is a primary structural element, carrying tension or compression to support the span.

A deck bridge is one in which the deck itself is the main structural element, itself carrying the roadway. Contrast to a truss bridge which may carry a deck on the top chords or bottom chords of a structural truss.

== Structural analysis ==
Structural engineers have several principal categories of bridge decks, for the purposes of analytic techniques. A beam deck is one where the deck and any supporting structure act together as a single beam. A grid deck uses beams and diaphragms as the supporting structure. The supporting system of a grid deck is analyzed using a grillage analysis. A slab deck is one where the deck is analyzed as a plate. If the slab has a stiffness that is different in two directions (at right angles), then the deck is known and analyzed as an orthotropic deck. A beam and slab deck is one where the beams may deflect somewhat independently, and any transverse forces are carried in the deck. A cellular deck is one where a number of thin slabs and webs will enclose cells within the deck. A boxgirder deck is one where the deck forms the top of the box girder during analysis.

== Railway bridge decks ==
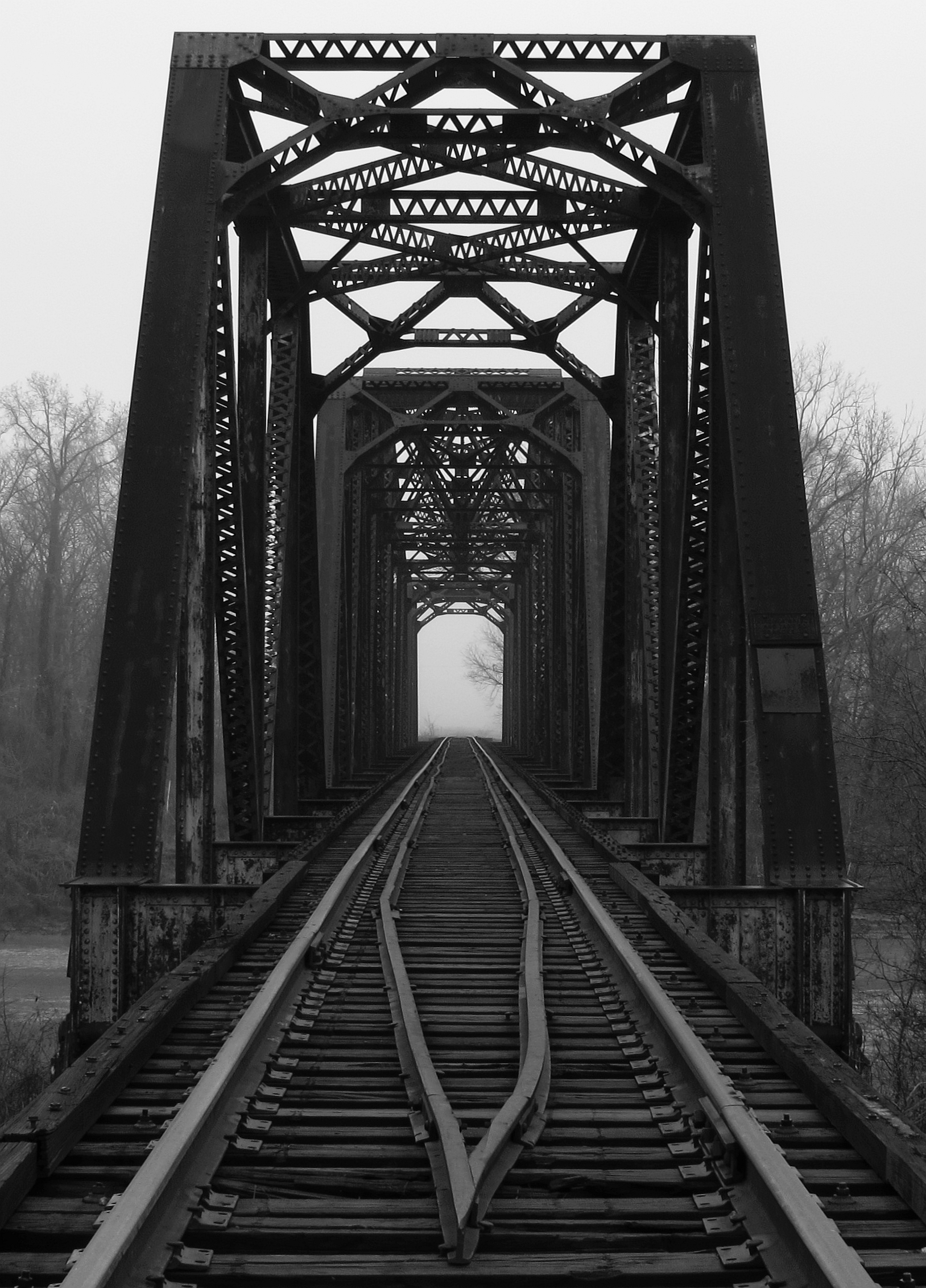
An open-deck railway bridge in Leflore County, Mississippi

A railway bridge with its track and ties supported on load carrying elements of the superstructure (floor beams, stringers or girders) is called an open deck. When the track rests upon ballast, which is then carried by the superstructure of the bridge, it is called a ballasted deck. The term direct fixation is used when the rails are anchored directly to the superstructure of the bridge.

== See also ==
- Bridge - for a visual index of various bridge types
- Bridge bearing
- Freeway lid
- Orthotropic deck
- Roadbed types
