= Florida building collapse =

Florida building collapse may refer to:

- 1974 Miami DEA building collapse
- Harbor Cay condominium collapse, a 1981 collapse of a condominium building under construction
- Surfside condominium collapse, a 2021 collapse of an inhabited building

== See also ==
- List of structural failures and collapses
