= Florida International University pedestrian bridge collapse =

Bridge collapse in Sweetwater, Florida

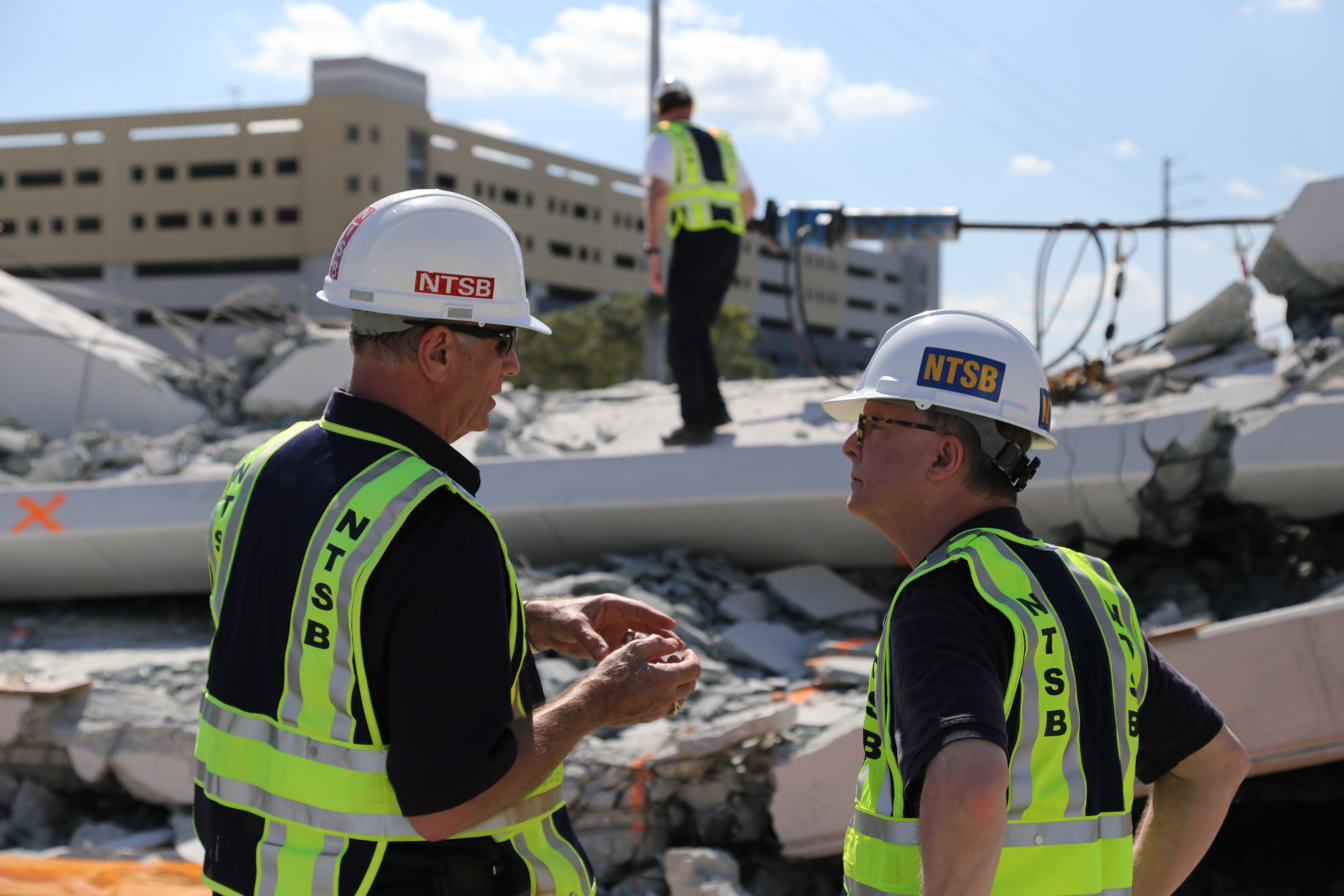
- National Transportation Safety Board members inspecting the collapsed pedestrian bridge on March 16
- Date: March 15, 2018
- Time: 1:47 p.m. EDT
- Location: University Park and Sweetwater, Florida, U.S.; 25.7612°N 80.3728°W
- Type: Bridge collapse
- Deaths: 6
- Injuries: 10

On March 15, 2018, a 175-foot-long (53 m) section of the FIU-Sweetwater UniversityCity Pedestrian Bridge collapsed while under construction. The collapse resulted in six deaths (one worker and five motorists), ten injuries (six serious and four minor), and eight vehicles being crushed. One employee was permanently disabled. At the time of the collapse, six lanes of road beneath the bridge were open to traffic.

The pedestrian bridge was designed to connect the town of Sweetwater to the campus of Florida International University (FIU) in University Park, a suburb west of Miami, Florida, United States. The two were separated by a busy eight-lane highway, which the bridge was designed to span.

The engineering design error that directly led to the collapse was identified by the National Transportation Safety Board (NTSB) as a miscalculation of resistance to sliding of the connection between the walkway surface and the truss that held it up. The walkway surface was poured concrete, which was allowed to harden before the truss braces were poured above it. These truss members were connected to the deck by steel reinforcing rods embedded in the deck and in the concrete of the truss. To hold up the bridge, these connections had to prevent the truss from sliding along the walkway surface. The resistance to sliding was miscalculated, and was insufficient to prevent the connection from sliding and causing cracks in the truss concrete. Cracking ultimately caused the complete disconnection of one of the truss-to-walkway connections, leading to the collapse.

== Background ==
FIU-Sweetwater UniversityCity Bridge
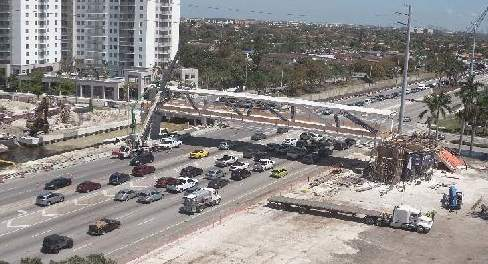
- Prior to collapse, March 15, 2018
- Coordinates: 25.7612°N 80.3728°W
- Carried: Pedestrian traffic
- Crossed: Tamiami Trail, Tamiami Canal
- Locale: University Park and Sweetwater, Florida, U.S.
- Owner: Florida International University

Characteristics
- Material: Self-cleaning concrete
- Total length: 320 feet (98 m)
- Longest span: 175 feet (53 m)
- No. of spans: 2

History
- Designer: FIGG Bridge Engineers
- Engineering design by: FIGG Bridge Engineers
- Constructed by: Munilla Construction Management
- Construction start: March 2016
- Construction cost: $14.2 million
- Collapsed: March 15, 2018

Location
- Interactive map of FIU-Sweetwater UniversityCity Bridge

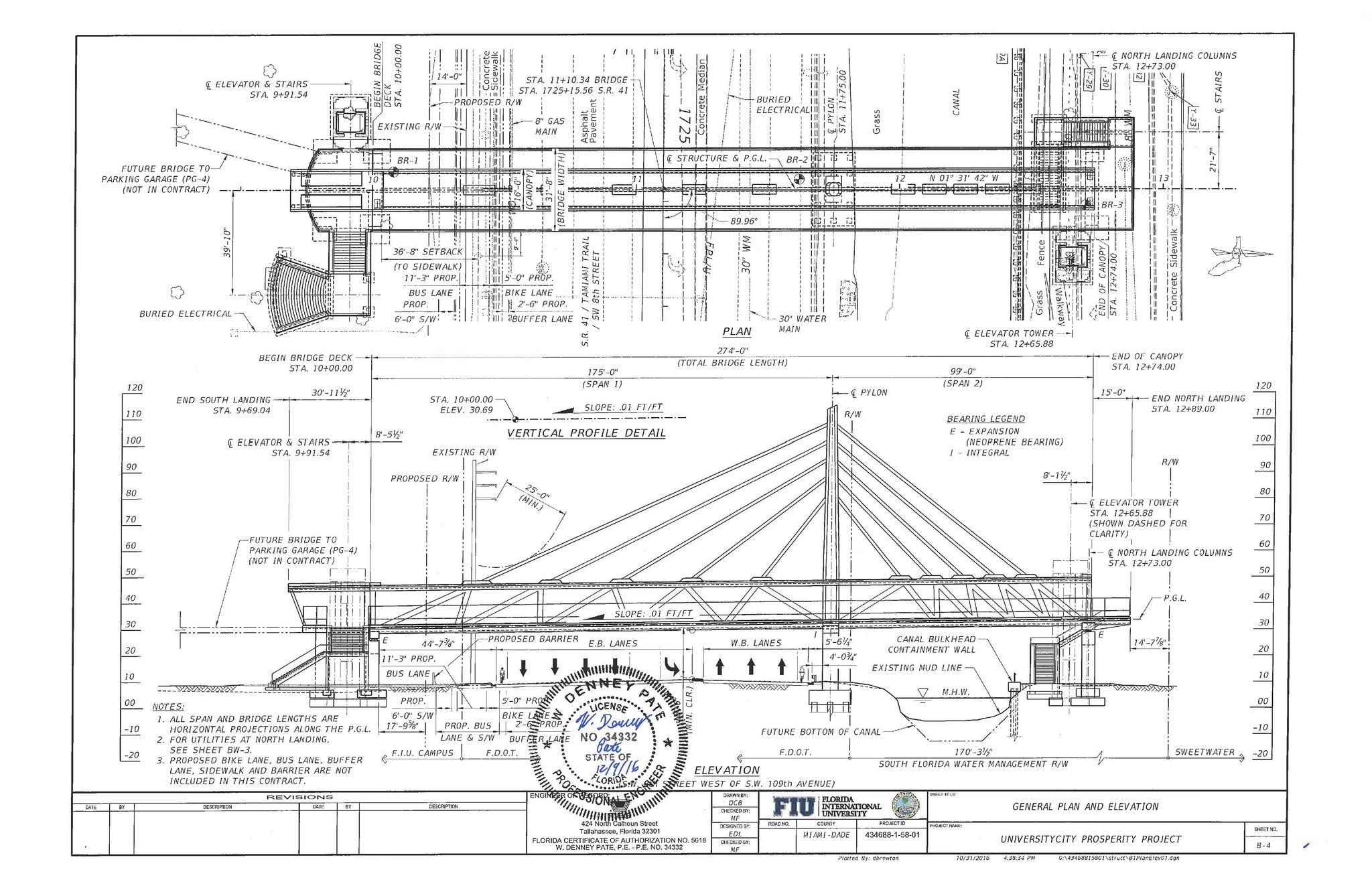
Elevation Engineering Drawing of Proposed FIU Sweetwater Pedestrian Bridge

The FIU Sweetwater UniversityCity pedestrian bridge, located just west of the intersection of Tamiami Trail (Southwest 8th Street) and Southwest 109th Avenue, was planned to connect the FIU campus to student housing neighborhoods in Sweetwater. It was intended to improve pedestrian safety, as the crosswalks at this wide, busy intersection had been identified as a safety hazard. One student had already been struck and killed by a vehicle there. The $14.2 million project was funded with a $19.4 million Transportation Investment Generating Economic Recovery (TIGER) grant from the United States Department of Transportation in 2013, along with funding from state agencies. The bridge cost $9 million to construct, exclusive of the installation cost.

The main companies behind the construction project were Munilla Construction Management (MCM), a Miami-based construction management firm, and FIGG Bridge Engineers, a Tallahassee-based firm. Unlike most bridges in Florida, the design for this project was overseen by the university, not the Florida Department of Transportation (FDOT), in a program known as the Local Agency Program (LAP).

Florida International University is known for its expertise in accelerated bridge construction (ABC) and has attracted international scholars as PhD students. It is home to the federally funded Accelerated Bridge Construction University Transportation Center, which sponsors industry conferences and seminars. The National Transportation Safety Board, however, found that with respect to the bridge, "F.I.U. had no professional engineers on its staff and relied solely on the expertise of its hired contractors."

== Bridge layout ==
The full 320-foot-long (98 m) pedestrian bridge was to cross both a major roadway and a parallel water canal with two separate spans connected at a faux cable-stayed tower. The main roadway-crossing span was 175 feet (53 m) long, and the shorter canal span was to be 99 feet (30 m) long. An elevator and stairs at the south end added 31 feet (9 m), and at the north end, 15 feet (5 m), for a total bridge length of 320 feet. At the bridge site, the Tamiami Trail roadway had seven lanes of traffic and one turn lane.

== Bridge design and construction ==
The new pedestrian bridge was designed to connect the campus to student housing in a dramatic, sculptural way and also to showcase the school's leadership in the ABC method of rapid bridge construction. The bridge was meant to last more than 100 years and to withstand a Category 5 hurricane, according to a statement by the university.

The full bridge project was styled to look like a cable-stayed bridge, with a pylon tower and high cables for dramatic effect. Functionally and structurally, it was a mono truss bridge, with the spans being fully self-supporting. The bridge spans used a "re-invented I-beam concept", a novel concrete truss design invented for this project. Concrete truss bridges are "exceedingly rare," and as of 2018, "no other designs similar to the FIU bridge" had been discovered. The vertical web of the beam consisted of a series of triangulated concrete diagonal struts along the centerline. The diagonal angles of the struts varied across the bridge so they would align with pipes from the center pylon in the eventual faux cable-stayed appearance. The concrete walkway deck was to act as the horizontal bottom flange of a wide I-beam, and the concrete roof canopy was to function as the horizontal top flange of the I-beam. The walkway was thus nearer to ground level than in a standard design where the walkway is placed on top of the structural support system. This reduced the number of steps that bridge users would have to climb.

The bridge was a post-tensioned concrete structure. Concrete structures are generally ten times heavier than equivalent steel designs. The bridge was made using a new formulation for concrete, which was intended to stay cleaner than standard concrete formulations. In the main bridge span, the concrete floor deck, roof, and most diagonal struts contained post-tensioning (PT) members whose compressive effect on the concrete was adjusted after the concrete was cured but prior to loading.

The deck and the canopy had PT cables that were permanently tensioned after the concrete was cured and while the main span was still located in the staging yard. Most of the diagonal truss members, also known as tendons, had two to four PT rods that could be tightened or loosened depending on the engineer's design plan. The high-strength steel rods are sleeved to allow free movement, with only their ends in contact with the concrete to provide a clamping force. This applied tension is necessary to keep concrete members in compression. All of the adjustable tendon rods were oriented with the nut end on top of the canopy, hidden with a "blister" of extra concrete. Adjusting the rods generally required a crane and the specialized crew of a subcontractor.

Two tendons of the main span, particularly the ones nearest the support ends, had PT rods designed for temporarily prestressing the concrete tendons during the movement of the 950-ton span. These four PT rods were tightened explicitly for the day it took to transport the main span over 8th Street and de-stressed (loosened) immediately thereafter. The purpose of the temporary prestressing of the two end tendons was due to the different loads during movement. The transporter's four-point support of the massive span essentially forces the two terminal ends of the bridge span to be cantilevered past the supports, unlike its final placement. To keep the bridge stable during transport, the four PT rods were torqued to each apply a load of 280,000 lbf (1,245,500 N). The other PT rods, inside the other tendons, were tightened just once and considered permanent. The transport of the prefabricated, 950-ton span (see below) to its location over 8th Street was performed five days before the subsequent collapse.

A specification change from the FDOT late in the planning phase required relocating central pier 11 feet (3.4 meters) north to allow for future widening of the highway, causing some changes in construction.

Construction of the bridge began in March 2016 and was scheduled to be completed in December 2018. The bridge's main span was assembled adjacent to the highway using accelerated bridge construction. It was lifted into place on the morning of March 10, 2018, five days before the collapse, during a weekend closure of the roadway.

== Collapse ==
Schematic of the bridge. Green: collapsed parts, Blue: not installed at the time of the collapse. The diagonal truss member (#11) that was undergoing post-tension rod tensioning at the time of the collapse is highlighted in red.

=== Reports of cracking ===
The main span of the bridge was in place by around 11:30 am on March 10. Inspections were performed, and the order was given to release the tension on the steel post-tensioned (PT) tendons at the terminal ends of the span. Kevin Hanson, the supervisor of the de-stressing operation of the PT tendons, became aware that cracks formed on the north side of the bridge and was concerned. He sent a text message to his supervisor, Sam Nunez, stating that "it cracked like hell" and included photos of the location near where the detensioned tendons were located. Pedro Cortes and other members of the construction contractor reviewed the cracking and took photos. These cracks were located in the area where the bridge contacts its supporting pier, where the structural diaphragm deck was located. Other cracks were observed in the northernmost diagonal truss member.

Two days before the collapse, on March 13, the engineer of record (EOR) from FIGG became aware of the cracks and began calculating remedial action, including the addition of plastic shims under the diaphragm. He then reported the cracking by voicemail to an FDOT employee. He thought this was not an immediate safety issue, merely something that would need to be repaired later. The FDOT recipient was away for several days and did not hear this message until the day after the collapse. FIGG's engineer of record then decided to re-tension the temporary PT rods in the northernmost tendon to their state on March 10. This plan was developed by FIGG over the 13th and 14th from the FIGG office in Tallahassee, and a meeting was scheduled for March 15 at 9:00 am in a trailer at the construction site.

Two FIGG engineers, including the EOR, arrived before the meeting to inspect the bridge span along with some of the managers of the consulting engineering firm and the main construction company. They used a lift to get a close view of the damage.

At 9 a.m. on March 15, a university employee heard a loud "whip cracking" sound while under the bridge span, waiting for a red traffic light. At the same time, the design-build team met for about two hours at the construction site to discuss the cracks discovered on March 10. Representatives from both FIU and FDOT were present. The FIGG lead engineer's conclusions were that the structural integrity of the bridge was not compromised and that there were no safety concerns raised by the presence of the cracks. FIGG also insisted that no crack repairs should be carried out until the stabilizing of the node and pylon diaphragm with post-tensioning was completed.

An additional measure proposed by FIGG at the meeting to remediate the cracking was telling the contractor that it "must expedite the pouring of the intermediate pylon," a structure that was designed to mimic the tower of a cable-stayed bridge. This pylon was to be located on the north end of the main span adjacent to the area that failed and affixed to the same substructure that the failing main span diaphragm sat upon.

The FIGG engineers on site "did not know the reason for the cracks, but still expressed no safety concerns" at the meeting.

FIGG did not know the reason for the cracks, but still expressed no safety concerns. However, FIGG in its presentation alluded to a lingering concern about the structural inadequacy of the 11/12 node until the intermediate pylon and back truss were completed. FIGG mentioned a "temporary mechanism to capture the nodal zone." FIGG opined that it may be "appropriate to transfer some of the load off 11/12 node." FIGG was to consider options to "capture some of the forces from the node." FIGG also stated that "prudent action is to share some of the load carried back to 9/10 and construct pylon diaphragm." FIGG further proposed to "restrain" the node. FIGG promised to deliver the temporary mechanism to capture the forces and node 11/12 by March 17, 2018 to MCM in two days, showing a sense of urgency.

FIGG rightly recognized the structural inadequacy of node 11/12, and presented remedial measures to "capture the loads," "restrain the node" and "share some of the loads" to the node 9/10. But at no time did FIGG recommend the shoring of the bridge at intermediate locations of the span to reduce loads in diagonal 11 and nodal zone 11/12 and closure of SW 8th Street until the proposed remedial actions were evaluated and implemented, thus exposing its own employees and employees of other entities to danger. That was an error on FIGG's part. The street closure was warranted due to the inadequacy of the node to support the loads during Stage 3, until all the remedial measures were designed, evaluated, peer reviewed and implemented or until the intermediate pylon was constructed. FIGG also very well knew that the truss was a non-redundant structure, and failure of diagonal 11 could result in the collapse of the bridge. FIGG knew that the Louis Berger Group, the independent consultant assigned to conduct the peer review of the bridge, did not perform independent design check of construction stage 3, i.e. the stage in which the truss collapsed.

As per the minutes of the meeting recorded by BPA/FIU, BPA asked if FIGG's analyses were peer reviewed, and stated that "the more eyes on this, the better." FIGG agreed. The analysis conducted by FIGG from March 12–14 was not, in fact, peer reviewed. FIGG presented the findings without the advantage of another set of eyes of an independent consultant. Please see, "Peer review" earlier in the report. FIGG knew that the engineer who performed the peer review did not check the bridge design during different stages of construction, in violation of the FDOT requirements. This made it all the more critical to conduct a peer review of FIGG’s latest analyses and recommendations. Even FIGG's recommendation of re-tensioning the PT bars of diagonal 11 was not peer reviewed. FIU, FDOT and MCM did not insist that all computations performed by FIGG, including FIGG's recommendation to re-tension the PT bars be peer reviewed. They deferred to FIGG's conclusions, and failed to apply their own judgement and judiciousness, even though FDOT, BPA and MCM have extensive experience in bridge and concrete construction.

— June 2019 OSHA Investigation of March 15, 2018 Pedestrian Bridge Collapse at Florida International University, Miami, Florida

Immediately after the meeting between FIGG employees and FIU, FDOT, BPA (Bolton Perez and Associates, Inc., the construction engineering and inspection firm), and MCM (the main construction contractor); the post-tensioning crew from Structural Technologies (US licensee of VSL tensioned-concrete technology) began to re-stress the two PT rods in diagonal truss member 11 to 280,000 pounds-force (1,245,500 N) each. Due to the urgency and short notice demanded by the EOR, the post-tensioning inspection subcontractor, the Corradino Group, was unavailable to monitor this process. FIGG employees, including the EOR, had gone back to Tallahassee. VSL had just completed the procedure, and still had some of their equipment attached and a crane in the air, when the bridge collapsed.

=== Collapse ===
FIU was on spring break at the time of collapse.

At 1:47 p.m. on March 15, the north end of the installed bridge span had a blowout as the northernmost tendon (11) sheared the remaining rebar in adjacent vertical truss member (12) at the cold joint (node) where truss members 11 and 12 join the deck. The span sagged deeply as the diagonal fractured, folded, and immediately dropped the heavy full span onto the roadway below. A dashcam video shows that the blowout, collapse, and impact sequence took only a few video frames.

United States Senator and FIU adjunct professor Marco Rubio tweeted that engineers were tightening loosened cables on March 15: "Workers were adding more tension to the steel rod (tendon) inside a concrete diagonal strut at the north end".

=== Aftermath ===
Six people were killed and ten were injured. Five of the victims were killed immediately when the bridge fell; one died at the hospital. Navaro Brown, aged 37, who worked for VSL, the company contracted to apply post-tensioning, died in the collapse. Two other employees of VSL were hospitalized. The other people killed were Alberto Arias, 53, Brandon Brownfield, 39, FIU student Alexa Duran, 18, Rolando Fraga, 60, and Oswaldo Gonzalez, 57.

At the time of the collapse, the roadway was open, and multiple eastbound cars were stopped at a traffic light under the span. Eight cars were crushed. A driver who survived the collapse reported that small rocks fell onto her car just before the front of her car was crushed. A worker saved himself when he heard cracking and locked his safety harness just before the collapse.

Southwest 8th Street between Southwest 107th and 117th Avenues was closed until March 24 while the debris was cleared.

== Inquiry ==
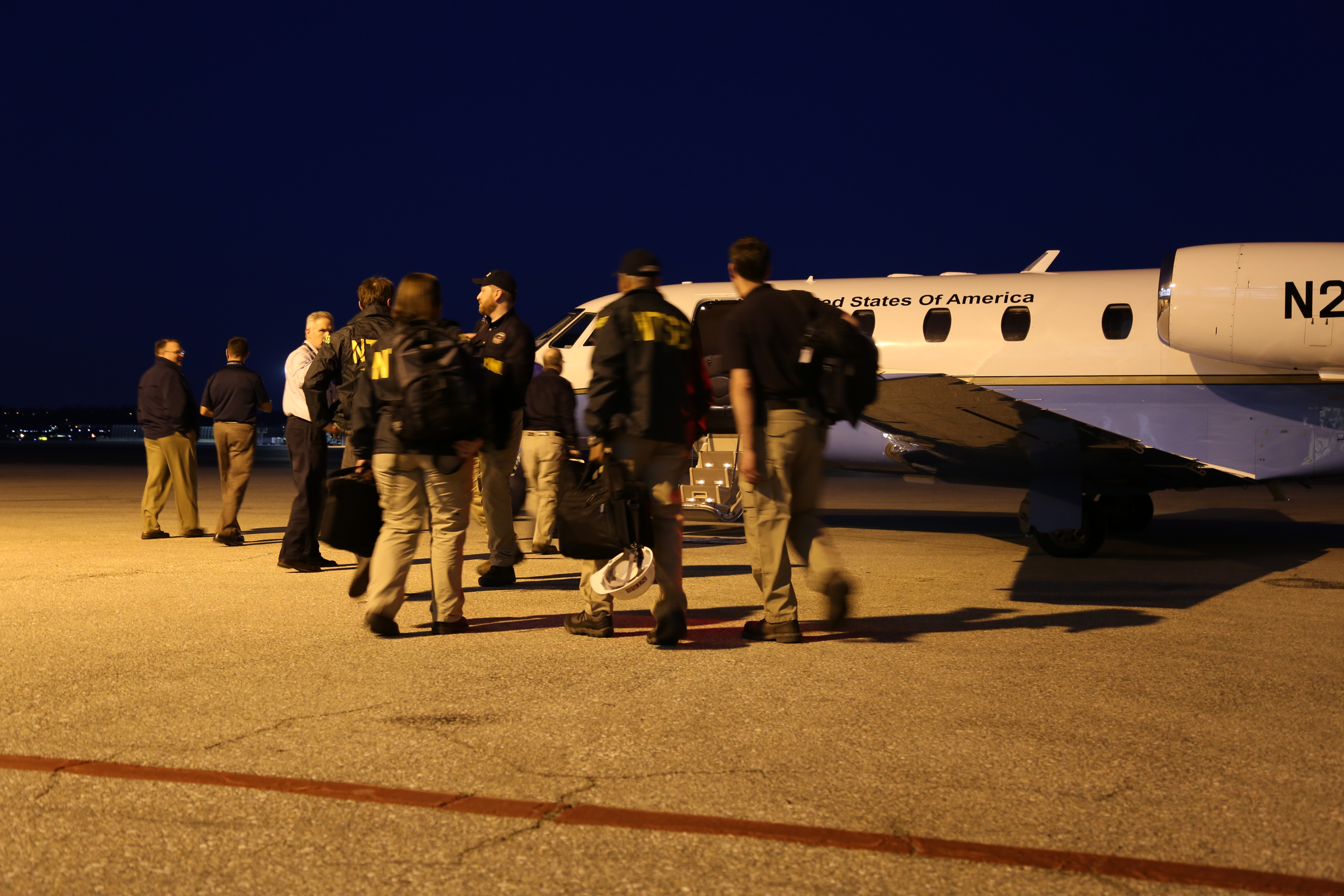
Members of the NTSB's go team for the investigation boarding an FAA plane to travel to Miami.

On March 15, 2018, the NTSB launched a go team of 15 people to investigate the bridge collapse. On March 16, 2018, the NTSB Investigators held their first press conference to discuss the inquiry into the bridge collapse. Noteworthy points from the meeting included a statement that cracks in the bridge superstructure did not necessarily make the bridge unsafe, that on-site investigations would take about a week, and that bridge workers were applying a "post-tensioning force" on the bridge before the failure. Also on March 16, 2018, the FDOT released a letter to the public with information about the bridge collapse:

According to standard procedures, FDOT issued a permit at the request of FIU's design build team to close SW 8th Street during the installation of the FIU pedestrian bridge on Saturday, March 10. While FDOT has issued, following a request from the FIU design build team, a blanket permit allowing for two-lane closures effective from January through April, at no time, from installation until the collapse of the bridge, did FDOT receive a request to close the entire road. The department was also not made aware by the FIU design build team of any scheduled "stress testing" of the bridge following installation and has no knowledge or confirmation from FIU's design build team of "stress testing" occurring since installation. Per standard safety procedure, FDOT would issue a permit for partial or full road closure if deemed necessary and requested by the FIU design build team or FIU contracted construction inspector for structural testing.

Additional, in the interest of full transparency, FDOT is today releasing the transcript of a voicemail left on a landline on Tuesday, March 13, by W. Denney Pate, FIGG's lead engineer responsible for the FIU pedestrian bridge project. The transcription is below [...] :

"Hey Tom, this is Denney Pate with FIGG bridge engineers. Calling to, uh, share with you some information about the FIU pedestrian bridge and some cracking that's been observed on the north end of the span, the pylon end of that span we moved this weekend. Um, so, uh, we've taken a look at it and, uh, obviously some repairs or whatever will have to be done but from a safety perspective we don't see that there's any issue there so we're not concerned about it from that perspective although obviously the cracking is not good and something's going to have to be, ya know, done to repair that. At any rate, I wanted to chat with you about that because I suspect at some point that's gonna get to your desk. So, uh, at any rate, call me back when you can. Thank you. Bye."

This voicemail was left on a landline and not heard by an FDOT employee until Friday, March 16 as the employee was out of the office on assignment. [...]

On Wednesday, March 14, Alfredo Reyna, the Assistant LAP Coordinator and an FDOT consultant, received a phone call from Rafeal Urdaneta, a Bolton Perez & Associates employee, notifying him of a midday meeting scheduled for Thursday, March 15 with W. Denney Pate and other members of the FIU design build team that are responsible for the project. FDOT is routinely included in meetings during LAP project construction. Reyna attended the meeting which occurred shortly before the bridge failure and collapse and was not notified of any life-safety issues, need for additional road closures or requests for any other assistance from FDOT.

The responsibility to identify and address life-safety issues and properly communicate them is the sole responsibility of the FIU design build team. At no point during any of the communications above did FIGG or any member of the FIU design build team ever communicate a life-safety issue. Again, FIGG and the FIU design build team never alerted FDOT of any life-safety issue regarding the FIU pedestrian bridge prior to collapse. [bold in original]

The tragic failure and collapse of the pedestrian bridge at FIU is the subject of an active and ongoing investigation led by the National Transportation Safety Board (NTSB) as well as local and state law enforcement investigations. As FDOT assists in these investigations, we will continue our internal review and release all pertinent information as quickly as possible while ensuring its accuracy.

On March 21, 2018, the NTSB sent out a press release detailing the items from the collapse that required further examination at the Turner Fairbank Highway Research Center, in McLean, Virginia. They also confirmed workers were adjusting rod tension when the collapse occurred.

On May 23, 2018, the NTSB released a preliminary report titled "Highway: Collapse of Pedestrian Bridge Under Construction Miami, Florida (HWY18MH009)" which summarized the accident. They said they are evaluating the emergence of cracks in the region of diagonal members 2 (south end of the bridge) and 11 (north end of bridge), and the propagation of cracks in the region of diagonal member 11. Pictures of the cracks from February 24 (before the walkway had been moved into place) were also given. Consulting engineers Bolton-Perez and Associates, had taken several pictures of severe cracks in diagonal member 11 and adjacent to vertical member 12 which had appeared when the bridge was moved into place on March 10.

The Turner-Fairbank Highway Research Center, at the request of the NTSB, tested samples of steel and concrete from the collapsed bridge, and found that the materials met the project requirements. The NTSB similarly asked the FHWA to examine the design of the bridge. The FHWA examination discovered that the bridge designers had overestimated the strength of one section of the bridge – at the point where the diagonal member 11 and vertical member 12 met the bridge deck – and underestimated the load that that same section would carry.

In June 2019, it was asserted to the court that Denney Pate's cell phone had been damaged in a washing machine and that its contents could not be retrieved to be used as evidence in the investigation. Judge Jennifer Bailey expressed skepticism about the claims.

In June 2019, OSHA released its final report on the FIU bridge collapse and concluded FIGG Bridge Engineers failed to recognize collapse was imminent when they inspected the bridge hours earlier. They also concluded the bridge had structural design deficiencies, severe cracks were wrongly ignored by the Engineer of Record (EOR) and warranted street closure, and contract bridge design experts violated basic FDOT construction requirements. It was also discovered that the independent peer review engineering firm, Louis Berger, was not qualified to serve in that capacity due to unmet licensing requirements.

The NTSB quickly disapproved of this release by OSHA, citing "a breach of party participation rules" and "contrary to party agreement obligations, OSHA released a report to the public that contained large portions of nonpublic draft NTSB material and failed to provide investigative photographs to the NTSB as required by its status as a party to the investigation."

On October 8, 2019, the NTSB released over 6,000 pages relating to its investigation of the collapse, including letters submitted to the NTSB by the various companies associated with the bridge construction. A final NTSB public hearing on the bridge accident was held October 22, 2019, in Washington, D.C., and concluded "that load and capacity calculation errors made by FIGG Bridge Engineers, Inc., are the probable cause of the fatal, March 15, 2018, Florida International University pedestrian bridge collapse in Miami." The final Highway Accident Report by the NTSB was finalized the same day.

== Legal actions ==
On March 19, 2018, a civil lawsuit was filed, by a survivor of the collapse, against FIGG Bridge Engineers, MCM, Bolton Perez & Associates, the project's consulting engineer, Louis Berger, and Network Engineering Services for reckless negligence.

On March 21, 2018, U.S. Transportation Secretary Elaine Chao asked the department's inspector general to probe whether the federally funded pedestrian bridge complied with all rules. A subsequent internal memorandum from the Inspector General of the U.S. Department of Transportation, dated March 22, 2018, expressed concerns the project complied with Federal specifications, and that the objective of an audit would be to assess whether the Florida International University pedestrian bridge met Federal and DOT requirements for the TIGER application, approval, and grant agreement processes.

On March 28, 2018, the Miami Herald reported they were denied access to FIU documents related to the bridge construction, citing federal regulations that prevent release of non-public information related to the bridge construction and design project when an NTSB investigation is in progress. A lawyer for Reporters Committee for Freedom of the Press indicated more information should be released under the Florida Sunshine Law, citing intense public interest in the collapse. On May 2, 2018, the Miami Herald filed a lawsuit against FDOT in Florida's Leon County Circuit Court to compel the FDOT to release emails, meeting minutes and other records relating to the bridge's design and construction. On May 3, 2018, a lawyer for the NTSB wrote a letter to Judge Cooper of the 2nd Judicial Circuit of Florida in Tallahassee urging the court to deny a ruling that would favor the Miami Herald plaintiff, for the release of any bridge information generated after a February 19, 2018, cutoff date.

On May 7, 2018, the Miami Herald reported they had received a copy of a memo with photographs from FIU dated February 28, 2018, that had been sent to the Munilla Construction Management company, the bridge project's builder. The memo, which has since been withdrawn from public view, purportedly urged the bridge engineer to respond to their concerns about significant cracks in the concrete joint at connection between the No. 11 truss and the bridge deck.

On August 21, 2018, Leon County Circuit Judge Kevin Carroll ruled the FDOT "shall produce to The Herald the requested records, but that production shall be limited to records from February 20th to March 15th (prior to the collapse)." However, two days later and just as the FDOT was about to release documents, the Florida State ruling was temporarily blocked by U.S. District Court Judge William Stafford on a request from the U.S. Attorney's Office for the Northern District of Florida (on behalf of the NTSB, who is seeking to move the case to a Federal Court). On October 5, Federal Judge Stafford made a final ruling to block the requested documents.

On June 27, 2018, the Travelers Indemnity Company and The Phoenix Insurance Company submitted an 18-page complaint for declaratory relief in U.S. District Court for Florida Southern District, Miami Division. The lawsuit filing seeks to avoid financial liability to the claimants and included the following statement: "There is no coverage under Travelers' and Phoenix's policies issued to Figg for any damages caused by the joint venture and/or partnership between Figg and MCM, as such joint venture and/or partnership was never disclosed to Travelers and Phoenix and does not qualify as an insured under either of the Policies issued to Figg."

On September 14, OSHA cited five companies for collectively seven violations, totaling $86,658 in proposed penalties. OSHA cited Figg Bridge Engineers Inc., a civil and structural engineering company; Network Engineering Services Inc. (doing business as Bolton Perez & Assoc.), a construction engineering and inspection firm; Structural Technologies LLC (doing business as Structural Technologies/VSL), specializing in post-tensioning in bridges and buildings; Munilla Construction Management LLC, a bridge and building construction company; and The Structural Group of South Florida Inc., a contractor specializing in concrete formwork.

A total of 18 civil lawsuits were filed against 25 businesses connected to the failed FIU bridge project. Miami-Dade Circuit Judge Jennifer Bailey is overseeing the on-going case.

On March 1, 2019, Munilla Construction Management, the main Miami-based contractor behind the pedestrian bridge construction, announced a restructuring and recapitalization of the company through a Chapter 11 bankruptcy petition plan of reorganization. The company reached a settlement deal with the victims and their families on May 2, 2019, that would pay up to $42 million.

== Replacement bridge ==
On May 6, 2020, FDOT announced plans to design and rebuild the bridge, with guidance from the NTSB. The design stage was scheduled to begin in 2021 and last for two years, with an estimated two-year timetable for the construction of the bridge. Demolition of the remnants of the old bridge began in September 2021.

On May 5, 2022, FDOT announced the design of the new bridge. The new bridge will be a cable-stayed steel box girder bridge built using a conventional six-step construction process with full closure and detour of the Tamiami Trail (Southwest Eighth Street). By November 4, 2024, the design of the 280-foot-long (85 m) bridge, contracted to Miami-based BCC Engineering, had been finalized and construction on the bridge itself had begun. The bridge is expected to be completed by the fall of 2026. FDOT manages the project with a budget of $14.6 million, and Sweetwater and FIU are local partners.

== See also ==
- List of bridge failures
- List of structural failures and collapses
- Surfside condominium collapse
- 1974 Miami DEA building collapse
