= Harbor Cay condominium collapse =

1981 construction disaster in Florida

Harbour Cay Condominium collapse
- Date: March 27, 1981
- Location: 3165 North Atlantic Avenue; Cocoa Beach, Florida 32931; 28°20′46″N 80°36′39″W
- Cause: Errors in design and construction
- Deaths: 11
- Injuries: 27

Harbour Cay Condominium

General information
- Status: Demolished
- Construction started: 1980
- Construction stopped: 1981

Height
- Height: 18.5 m

Technical details
- Floor count: 5

Design and construction
- Developer: Univel Corporation

The Harbour Cay Condominium was a five-story flat plate residential development project in Cocoa Beach (Brevard County, Florida, United States) that collapsed during construction on March 27, 1981. Eleven workers were killed and twenty-seven injured.

The building, being constructed by the Univel Corporation of Cocoa Beach, collapsed as workers were completing its framework by pouring concrete for the roof. The accident led to more rigorous enforcement of engineering and construction codes in Florida and elsewhere.

== Cause ==
The collapse was due to numerous errors in design and construction. The concrete slabs were only 8 inches (200 mm) thick and should have been 11 inches (280 mm) thick to satisfy the American Concrete Institute's Building Code minimum to omit deflection calculations for the slabs. The plastic chair spacers used to support the slab steel were 4 1/4 inches (110 mm) high (not high enough to match the design intent), which coupled with the thin slabs led to a very small effective depth. Other design and construction errors, omissions, and deficiencies are identified in the Department of Commerce report, including issues with reshores and missing design checks for punching shear and deflection.

Department of Commerce report stated “The analysis showed that shear stresses in the slab at many column locations on the fifth floor exceeded the nominal shear strength. Thus, punching shear failure at one of the columns precipitated a progressive failure of the slab throughout the entire fifth floor.”

== Charges ==
Two engineers, an architect, and two contractors were charged with negligence, misconduct and failing to conform to state and local building laws. Both of the engineers surrendered their license to practice engineering in the state of Florida, paid fines, and promised to never practice in Florida again; litigation against the architect and contractors continued. According to Mike Thomas of the Orlando Sentinel on April 20, 1997, the local contractor, Univel, folded almost immediately. The senior developer, and the real money behind the project, contractor Towne Realty out of Milwaukee, agreed to a settlement out of court to avoid litigation. They have continued to develop properties to this day.

== Actions ==
The Florida Administrative Code was amended to require engineers and architects to serve as threshold inspectors. Those requirements include experience performing structural field inspections of threshold buildings. The required experience ranged from three to five years, depending on the threshold inspector's principal practice.

== See also ==
- 2021 Surfside condominium collapse
- 1971 2000 Commonwealth Avenue collapse
- List of structural failures and collapses
