= Crestview Towers =

Residential condominium building in North Miami Beach, Florida

- Interactive map of the Crestview Towers area

General information
- Location: 2025 NE 164th St., North Miami Beach, Florida
- Coordinates: 25°55′40″N 80°09′34″W
- Groundbreaking: 1969
- Completed: 1972
- Landlord: Crestview Towers Condo Association

Technical details
- Floor count: 10
- Grounds: 2 acres (0.81 ha)

Design and construction
- Architect: Phillip Pearlman
- Developer: Parkview International Developers Co.
- Structural engineer: Gerald J. Spolter
- Main contractor: Cohen-Ager Inc.

Website
- crestviewtowerscondominium.com

Crestview Towers is a mid-rise condominium building in Miami-Dade County, Florida built in 1972 that was closed and immediately evacuated the evening of July 2, 2021 by order of the city of North Miami Beach due to the building being structurally and electrically unsound. The building was 9 years delinquent on its 40-year recertification, which had become a focus of city and state authorities in the wake of the Surfside condominium collapse the previous week. On August 9, 2021, a fire started in a unit on the second floor, potentially electrical in nature, and was extinguished.

== Background ==
Crestview Towers had its groundbreaking in 1969, construction was finished in 1972. The building was developed by Parkview International Developers Co. Phillip Pearlman was the architect and Gerald J. Spolter was the structural engineer. Cohen-Ager Inc. was general contractor. The building has 156 units housing approximately 300 residents. The building had been due for its 40-year recertification in 2012, and had been cited and fined nearly $600,000 since 2014. Inspections and enforcement of condominium buildings were stepped up following the collapse of the Champlain Towers South condominium building in nearby Surfside, Florida on June 24, with the city manager of North Miami Beach ordering an audit of buildings on June 29. Crestview's building manager delivered an engineering report to the city on July 2 dated from January that showed the building was structurally and electrically unsafe for continued occupancy.

A notice posted to the condominium's website by the Board of Directors 11 days prior to the evacuation announced repairs and improvements planned or underway to the roof, electrical generator, lighting, paint, banquet room, pool, floors, access keys, gates, and parking lot. The posting noted for some improvements that "the city demands this work from us to be able to pass the 40-year certification, which is something we could not postpone any longer."

== Evacuation ==
Upon receiving the engineering report, closure and evacuation of the building's residents was ordered around 4pm on July 2, with the Red Cross assisting residents in finding temporary shelter. Residents were initially given three hours to vacate, but the evacuation wasn't completed until the following day. Temporary lodging was being provided to dislocated residents at the city's Youth Fair complex, which housed about 28 families.

Engineers from both the city and the condo association inspected the building on July 3, with results expected to be released three to four days later. City officials revealed that the condo association had not applied for any permits related to repairs or the recertification process, which was nearly a decade overdue. Officials expressed distrust of the condo association and discussed potential legal action to force the condo association to comply or to seek a court-appointed receivership.
