= National Construction Safety Team Act =

US law

The National Construction Safety Team Act (H.R. 4687), signed into law October 1, 2002, authorizes the National Institute of Standards and Technology (NIST) to establish investigative teams to assess building performance and emergency response and evacuation procedures in the wake of any building failure that has resulted in substantial loss of life or that posed significant potential of substantial loss of life.

It provides the NIST with the responsibilities and authorities modeled on those of the National Transportation Safety Board (NTSB), except for the investigation of building failures instead of transportation accidents. The act gives the NIST the responsibility to dispatch teams of experts, where appropriate and practical, within 48 hours after major building disasters and specifically states that at least one member of each team must be a NIST employee.

The act gives the teams a clear mandate to:

1. establish the likely technical cause of building failures;
2. evaluate the technical aspects of procedures used for evacuation and emergency response;
3. recommend specific changes to building codes, standards, and practices;
4. recommend any research or other appropriate actions needed to improve the structural safety of buildings; and/or changes in emergency response and evacuation procedures; and,
5. make final recommendations within 90 days of completing an investigation.

And the investigative authority needed to:

- access the site of a building disaster;
- subpoena evidence;
- access key pieces of evidence such as records and documents; and
- move and preserve evidence.

However, the NIST is not a regulatory body and cannot require the adoption of building codes, standards or practices by state and local governments. Its investigations may not consider findings of fault, responsibility, or negligence and "No part of any report resulting from such investigation, or from an investigation under the National Construction Safety Team Act, shall be admitted as evidence or used in any suit or action for damages arising out of any matter mentioned in such report." To date, the NCST has chosen not to exercise its subpoena authority.

== National Construction Safety Team Act Reports (NIST NCSTAR) ==
Reports commissioned under the act include, in numerical order:

- NCSTAR 1: Final Report on the Collapse of the World Trade Center Towers
- NCSTAR 2: Report of the Technical Investigation of The Station Nightclub Fire
- NCSTAR 3: Technical Investigation of the May 22, 2011, Tornado in Joplin, Missouri

In addition, investigations on Hurricane Maria (2017) and on Champlain Towers South Collapse (2021) are ongoing.
