= Rapid bridge replacement =

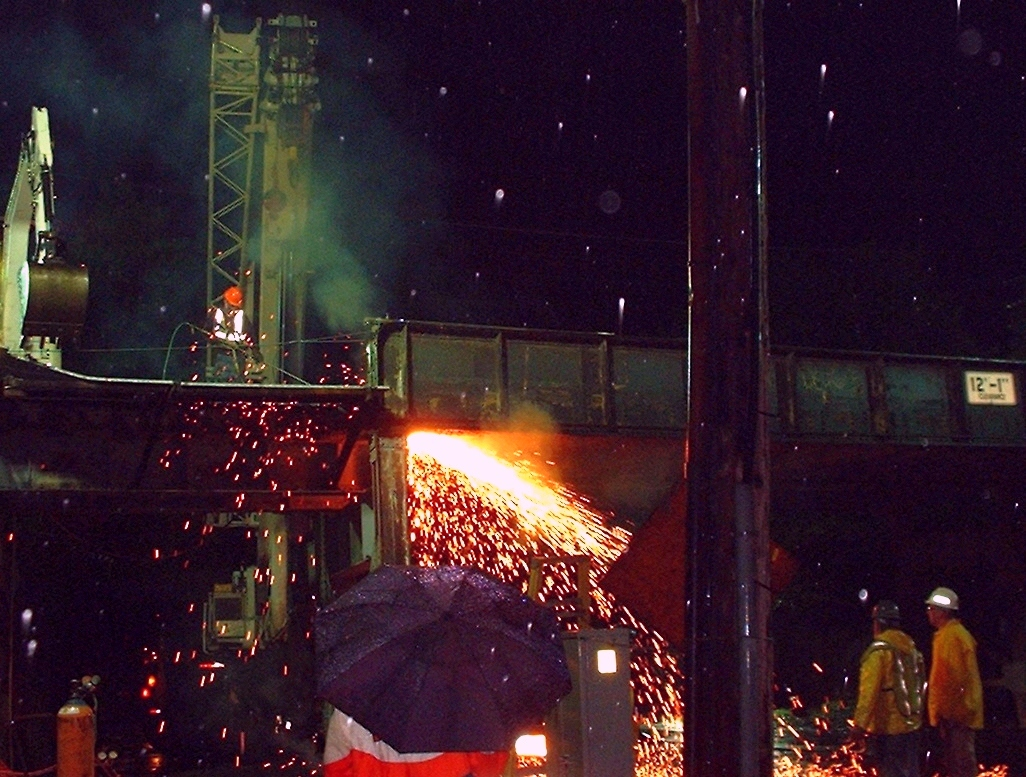
Thermal lance cutting away a railroad bridge in Binghamton, New York to prepare for its overnight replacement.

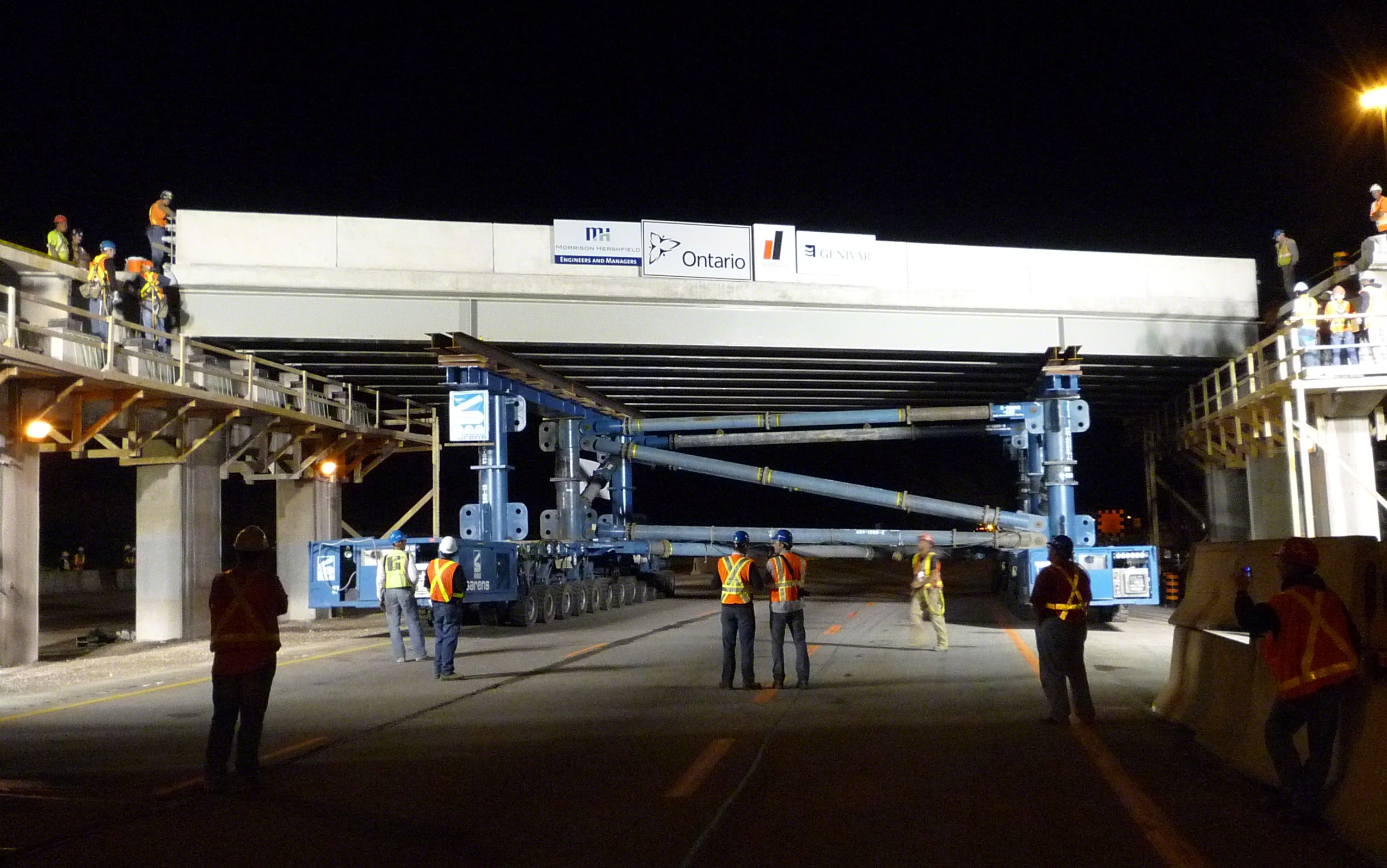
Self-propelled modular transporters moving Hamilton, Ontario's Aberdeen Bridge span into place.

Rapid bridge replacement or accelerated bridge construction (ABC) is a technique that allows bridges to be replaced with minimum disruption to traffic. The replacement bridge is constructed on a site near the bridge to be replaced. When it is completed, the old bridge is cut away and removed using self-propelled modular transporters (SPMTs). Then the SPMTs lift the new bridge, transfer it to the work site and put it in place. Often the highway or railroad carried by the bridge is closed for just one weekend. Conventional techniques typically replace half a bridge at a time, with all highway traffic redirected under the other bridge half, often for a year or more, while construction progresses. Accelerated bridge construction alternatives consist of ABC components and ABC techniques. Components can be categorized into prefabricated bridge elements (e.g. beams, bridge decks, footings, columns, pier caps, abutments etc.) or prefabricated bridge systems (e.g. bridge modules with superstructures and/or substructures). ABC involves fabrication of these elements or systems off-site in a regulated environment, and transporting those to site for installation. Related processes such as lifting, placement, transportation, embankment construction are termed as ABC techniques.

Notable rapid bridge replacement projects include Interstate 93 in Massachusetts, where 14 bridges were replaced over 10 weekends in 2011. Utah was the first state to use the ABC method as their (Utah DOT) standard bridge construction practice.

== Standards ==
=== NEXT Beam ===
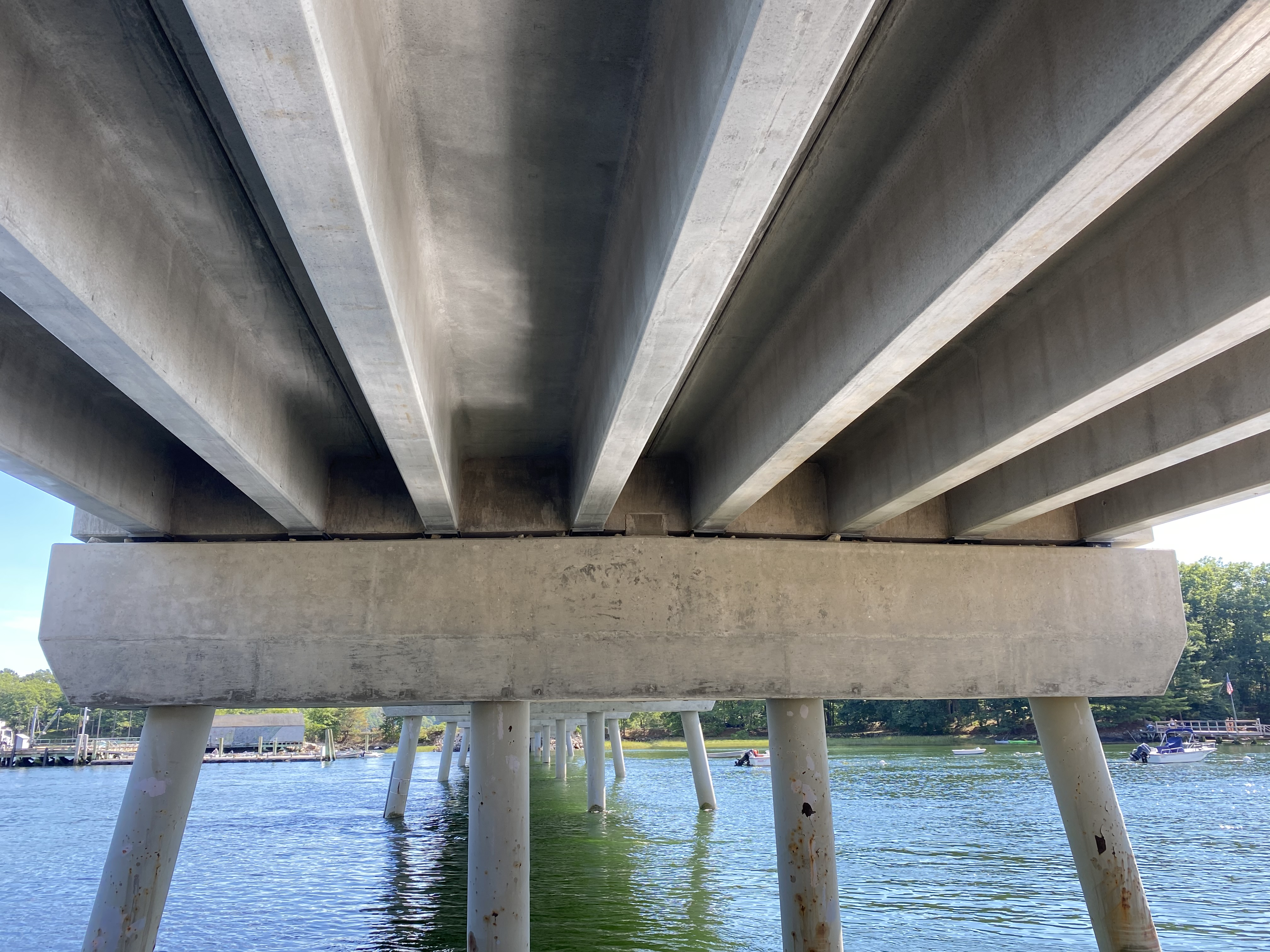
The first NEXT Beam bridge in York, Maine

The development of Northeast Extreme Tee Beam or NEXT Beam was started in 2006 by the Precast/Prestressed Concrete Institute (PCI) North East to update regional standard on accelerated bridge construction for northeastern states of the United States. The NEXT Beam design was inspired by double-tee designs that have been used to build railroad platform slabs. The use of double tees with wide flanges allows the use of fewer beams, which stay in place to form the deck, resulting in a shorter construction time. The first design was introduced in 2008, called "NEXT F" with 4-inch (10 cm) flange thickness requiring a 4-inch (10 cm) topping. This was used for the construction of the Maine State Route 103 bridge that crosses the York River. The seven-span 510-foot (160 m) long bridge was completed in 2010 as the first NEXT beam bridge. The second design was introduced in 2010 for Sibley Pond Bridge at the border of Canaan and Pittsfield, Maine. The design was called "NEXT D" with an 8-inch (20 cm) flange thickness that does not require deck topping, allowing the wearing surface to be applied directly onto the beams. The combination of F and D, called "NEXT E", was introduced in 2016.

As of 2018, thirteen US states have accepted the NEXT beam standard: Connecticut, Delaware, Georgia, Maine, Massachusetts, New Hampshire, New Jersey, New York, Pennsylvania, Rhode Island, South Carolina, Vermont, and Virginia. New Brunswick, Canada also accepts the standard.

== Incidents ==
On March 15, 2018, a partially completed bridge at Florida International University collapsed five days after it was placed using this method. FIU is home to the Accelerated Bridge Construction University Transportation Center, a federally-funded center. FIU planned an independent investigation into the cause of the collapse.
