= Surfside condominium collapse =

2021 building collapse in Florida, US

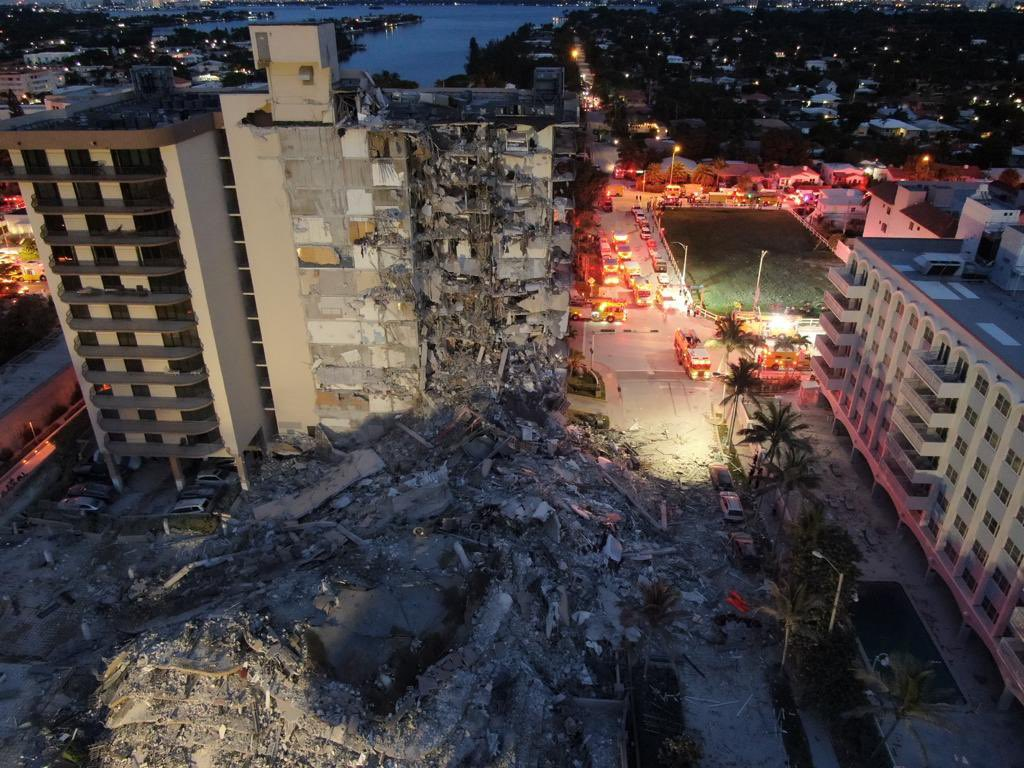
- View of Champlain Towers South site, the morning of the collapse
- Date: June 24, 2021; 5 years ago
- Time: Approximately 1:22 a.m. EDT (UTC−4)
- Location: 8777 Collins Avenue; Surfside, Florida 33154; 25°52′23″N 80°07′15″W
- Cause: See § Possible causes
- Deaths: 98
- Injuries: 11
- Property damage: $1 billion
- Litigation: Judge approves $1.02 billion settlement for victims of Surfside condo collapse

On June 24, 2021, at approximately 1:22 a.m. EDT, Champlain Towers South, a 12-story beachfront condominium in the Miami suburb of Surfside, Florida, United States, partially collapsed, causing the deaths of 98 people. Four people were rescued from the rubble, but one of them died of injuries shortly after arriving at the hospital. Eleven others were injured. Approximately 35 were rescued the same day from the intact portion of the building, which was demolished ten days later.

A contributing factor under investigation was long-term degradation of reinforced concrete structural support in the basement-level parking garage under the pool deck, due to water penetration and corrosion of the reinforcing steel. The problems had been reported in 2018 and noted as "much worse" in April 2021. A $15 million program of remedial works had been approved before the collapse, but the main structural work had not started. Other possible factors considered included land subsidence, insufficient reinforcing steel, and corruption during construction.

In June 2026, the National Institute of Standards and Technology (NIST) released their technical findings on what caused the partial collapse. The team concluded the collapse began in early June 2021, when two connections between garage columns and the pool deck failed. This led to the catastrophic collapse of the building on June 24, 2021, when two of the supporting columns in the middle part of the tower failed.

The Champlain Towers South collapse ties with the Knickerbocker Theatre collapse as the third-deadliest non-deliberate structural engineering failure in United States history, behind collapse of the Pemberton Mill and the Hyatt Regency walkway collapse.

== Background ==
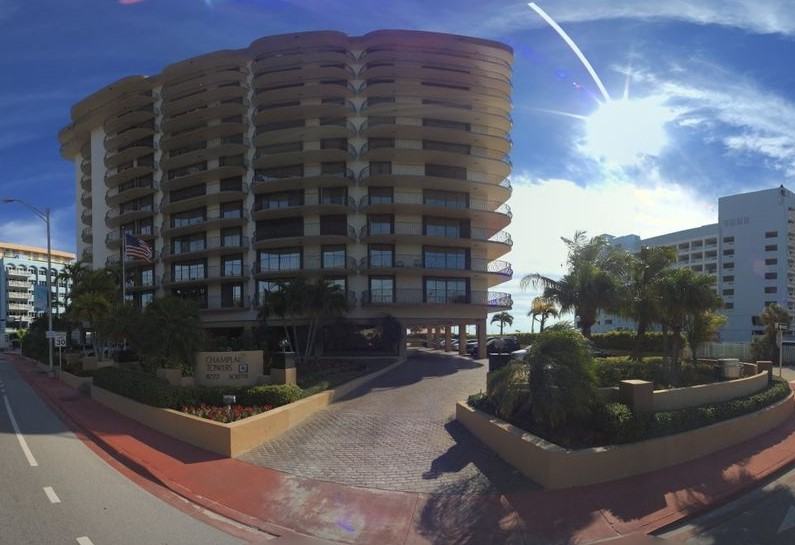
Champlain Towers South in 2015

The residential condominium building, Champlain Towers South, was located at 8777 Collins Avenue (Florida State Road A1A) in the town of Surfside, just north of Miami Beach, Florida. Champlain Towers South (completed in 1981) was part of a three-building complex along with Champlain Towers North (completed in 1982) and Champlain Towers East (built between the North and South buildings in 1994). All three were L-shaped structures with 12 stories, but as of 2021, the South building contained the most units at 136, including a rooftop penthouse. Units varied in size from 1,200 to 4,500 ft^{2} (110 to 420 m^{2}) and from one to four bedrooms. The penthouse was a controversial part of Champlain Towers South's design, as an exemption was needed to exceed Surfside's height limit. The penthouses were also not part of the original building permits.

William M. Friedman & Associates Architects, Inc., was the architect for the project's 1979 contract drawings. Breiterman Jurado & Associates, consulting engineers, were responsible for engineering aspects and the 1979 contract drawings, with Breiterman and associates covering structural items and Jurado and associates covering electrical and mechanical.

The project was the first new construction in Surfside following a moratorium on new development imposed by Miami-Dade County due to water and sewer infrastructure problems in Surfside during the 1970s. In 1979, developers paid the city $200,000 (equivalent to $887,000 in 2025) to fund the replacement of the sewer system and secure approval for the construction of the condos.

== Collapse ==
Surveillance video on YouTube
- Video shows South Florida building collapse, by Fox 13 Tampa Bay

The pool deck of Champlain Towers South suddenly suffered a partial collapse at about 1:14 a.m, followed by the progressive collapse of the central section and eastern wing of the building at 1:22 a.m. EDT on June 24, 2021. The collapse of the building lasted less than 12 seconds. Surveillance video footage indicates that a large north-central section of the building collapsed first. This isolated and destabilized part of the northeast corner of the building, which collapsed approximately nine seconds later. Of the 136 units in the building, at least half were destroyed.

== Casualties ==
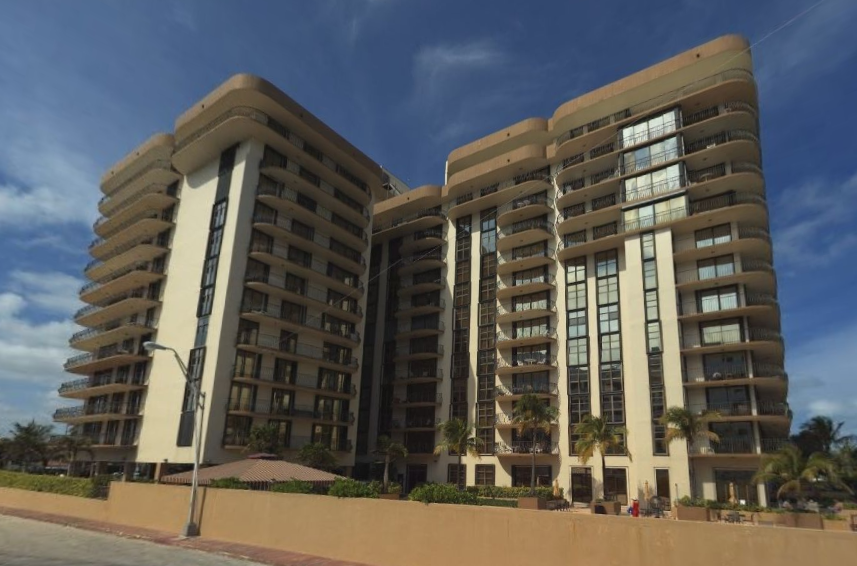
The condominium in 2015

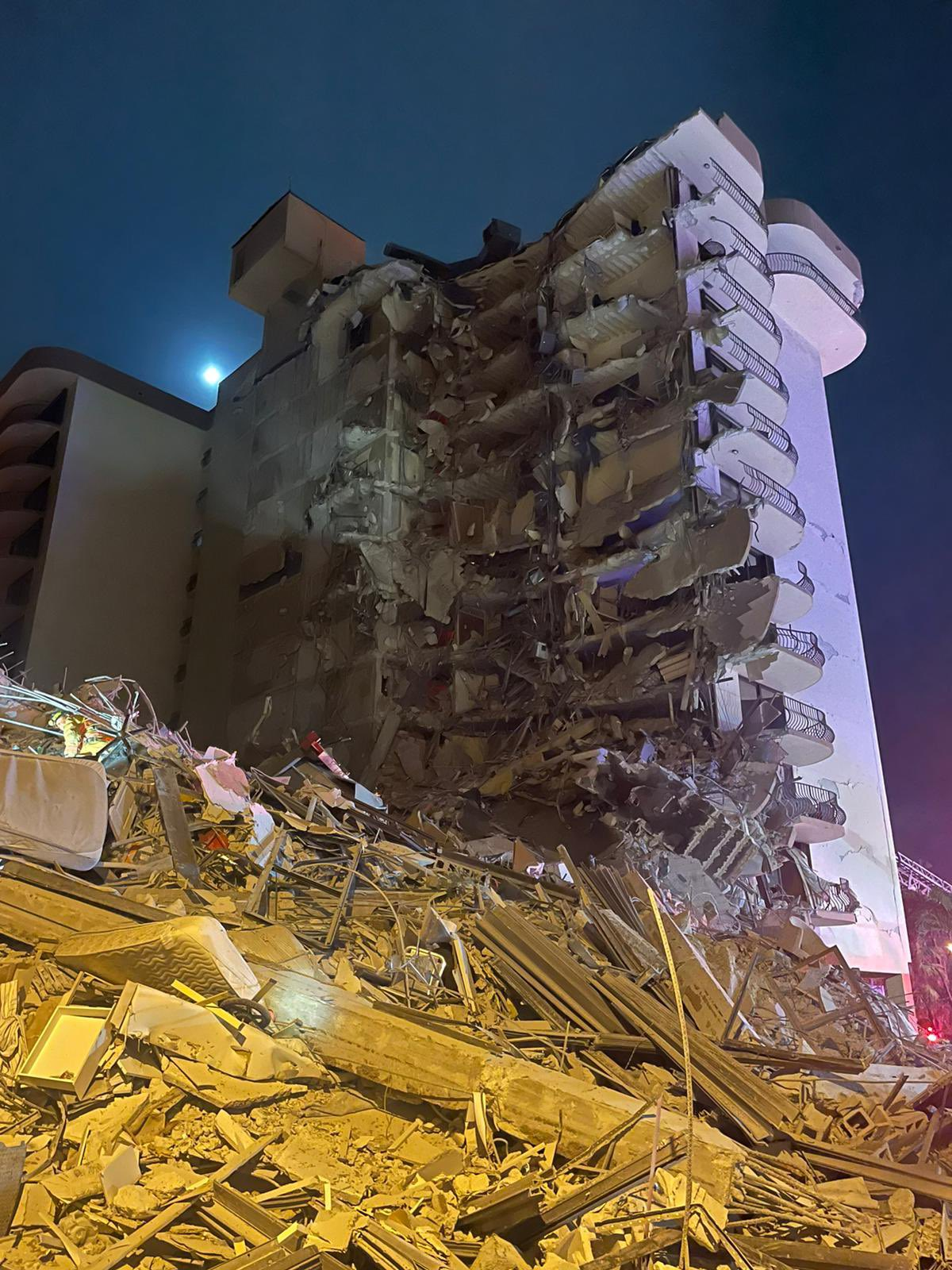
Remaining part of the structure on June 24, which was demolished on July 4

The collapse killed 98 people. The sister of Silvana López Moreira, the First Lady of Paraguay, died in the collapse along with her husband, their three children and their nanny.

Casualties by nationality or national origin
Country	Deaths	Injured	Ref.
United States	64	10	(Note: One dual British-American citizen is confirmed dead, tabulated in Casualties by nationality table under "United Kingdom".)
Paraguay	6		
Argentina	4	1	
Canada	4		
Cuba	4		
Venezuela	4		
Colombia	3		
Uruguay	2		
Australia	2		
Brazil	1		
Chile	1		
Costa Rica	1		
Italy	1		
United Kingdom	1		
Total	98	11	

== Rescue and relief operations ==
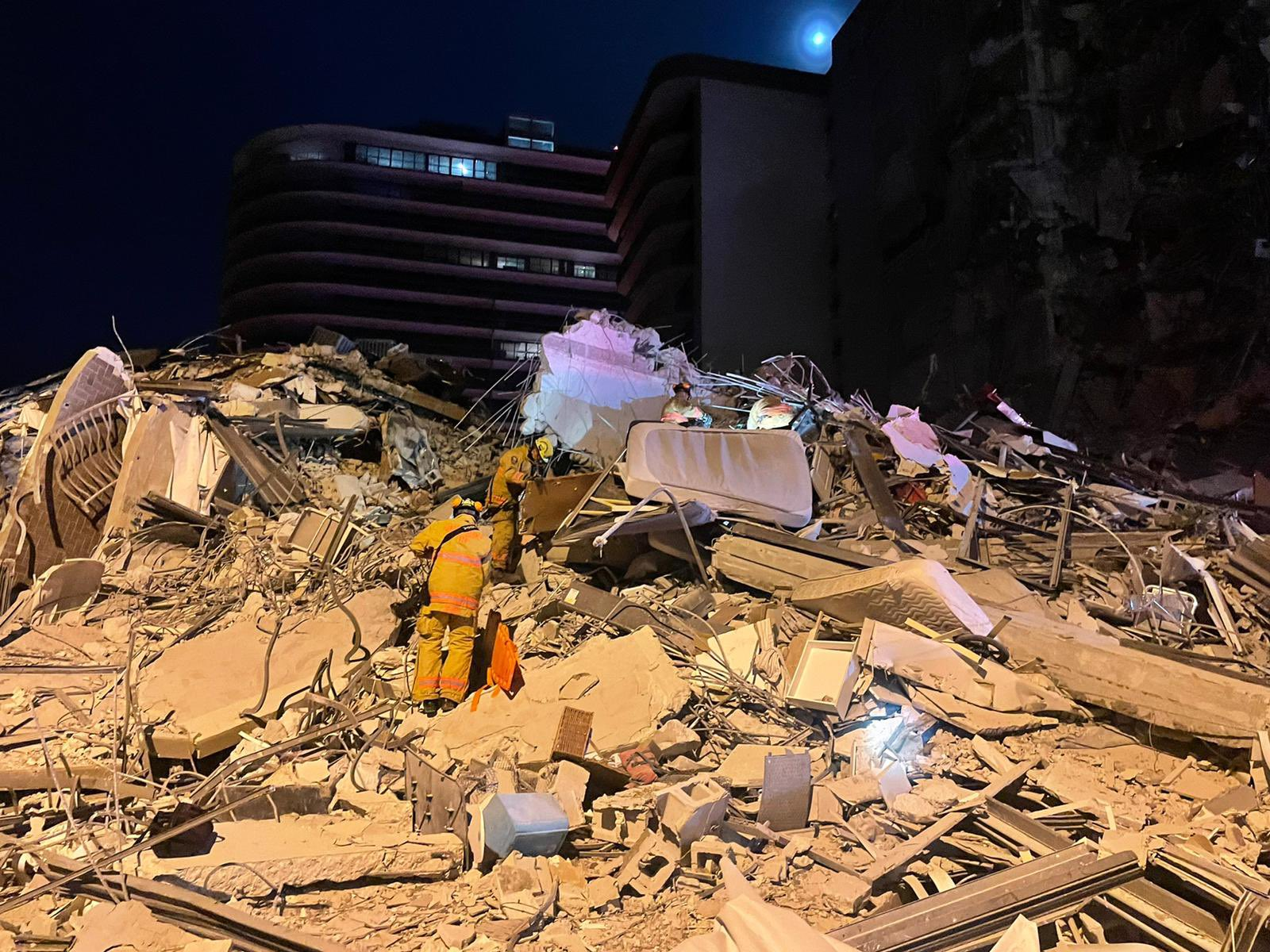
Miami-Dade firefighters search for survivors, June 24

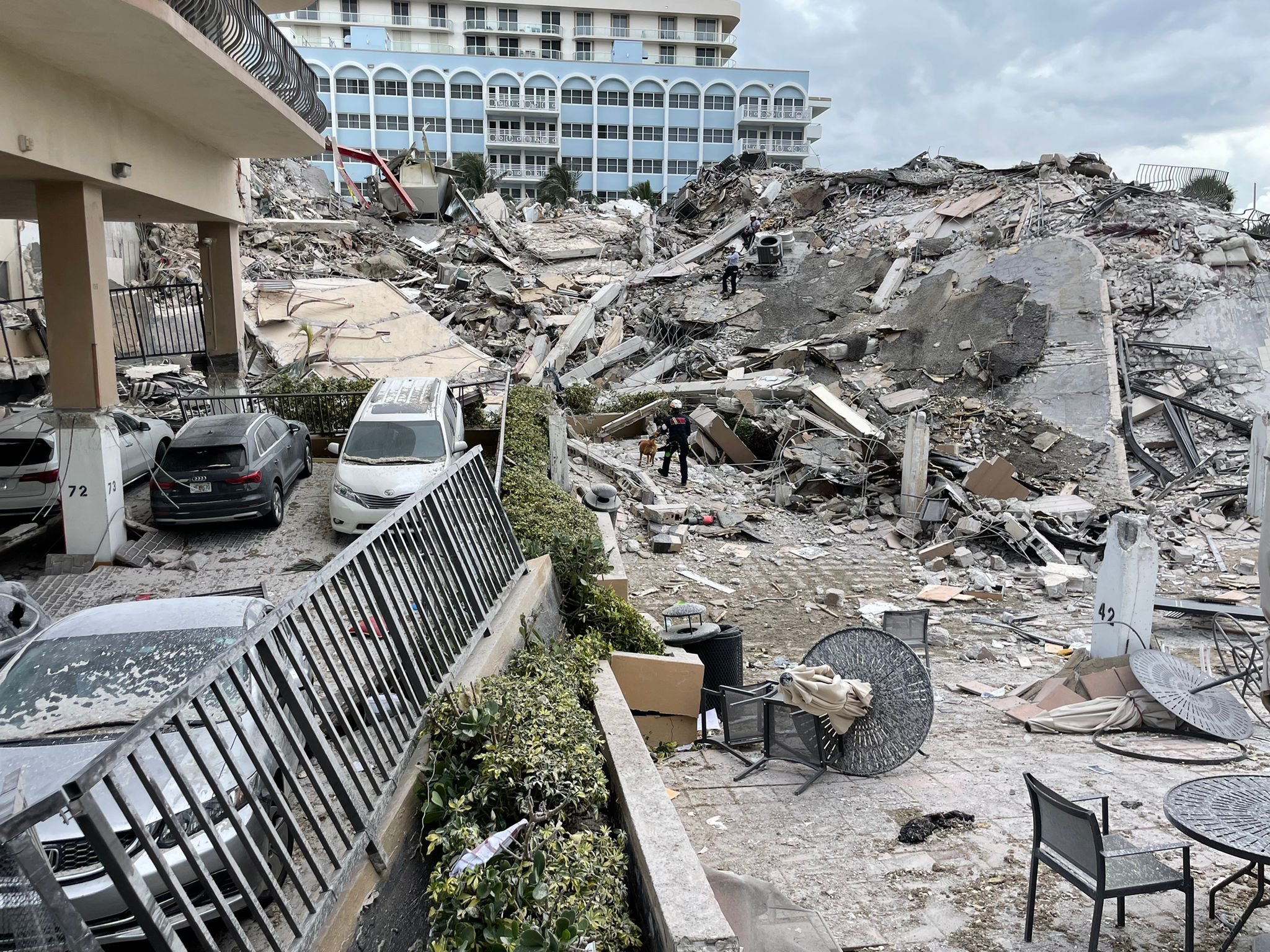
Rescuers with a search and rescue dog, June 24

On June 24, more than 80 rescue units responded to the collapse, according to the Miami-Dade Fire Rescue Department. Surfside mayor Charles Burkett said in a news conference that ten people were treated at the scene, one person was dead, and two people were hospitalized. Both hospitalized victims – a mother and her daughter – survived with serious injuries, having fallen from the ninth floor to the fifth floor. They were pulled from the rubble by Miami Dade Fire-Rescue Aerial 19; it was originally erroneously reported by WFOR-TV (CBS 4 Miami) that the mother rescued herself. Her husband did not survive. Their family cat was later found wandering near the collapsed building. At least 35 people were rescued on June 24 and up to 159 were unaccounted for. A woman's voice, later identified as 36-year-old Theresa Velasquez, was heard until around 11:00 a.m., but rescuers were unable to reach her. Miami-Dade County mayor Daniella Levine Cava signed a state of emergency declaration at 4:33 p.m. on June 24 and called on Florida governor Ron DeSantis to do so at the state level. Governor DeSantis viewed the site on the same day, and issued a state of emergency. The White House and Federal Emergency Management Agency stated that they were in contact with local officials and providing assistance. President Joe Biden was briefed on the event, and spoke with Miami-Dade County mayor Levine Cava.

Two FEMA Urban Search and Rescue Task Force teams, Urban Search and Rescue Florida Task Force 1 based in the Miami-Dade Fire Rescue and Urban Search and Rescue Florida Task Force 2 based in the Miami Fire-Rescue Department, were activated. An additional three teams, one in Ohio and two in Virginia, were put on standby. Members of Hatzalah of South Florida, a Jewish faith-based ambulance service which was authorized to transport patients as part of a law signed the previous week in Surfside, were among the first to respond, setting up an onsite triage station.

Israel offered clothes, medication, food, water, and other aid to the victims of the collapse, according to Israeli consul general Maor Elbaz-Starinsky, who came to the scene and conveyed an official offer from the Israeli government to send the Israel Defense Forces' Home Front Command search and rescue team to assist in the rescue efforts. The Command has assisted in many other disasters, such as the 2017 Puebla earthquake, 2010 Haitian earthquake, and Typhoon Haiyan. Israel's President Reuven Rivlin, Prime Minister Naftali Bennett and Foreign Minister Yair Lapid offered condolences and support. A unit specializing in providing psychological and emotional stabilization following traumatic incidents was dispatched from United Hatzalah. At least 35 of those missing were Jewish.

The National Basketball Association's Miami Heat staff handed out water and snacks to state emergency workers. World Central Kitchen and Direct Relief, both of which are beneficiaries of the Heat's charitable arm, were also helping. American Red Cross volunteers assisted people displaced by the collapse.

On June 25, Mayor Levine Cava announced that rescue teams from Israel and Mexico had joined the search and rescue effort, rotating in two daily 12-hour shifts of sifting through the rubble.

In a news conference on June 26, mayor Levine Cava explained that a fire deep within the rubble and subsequent smoke were impeding the ability of fire and rescue personnel to search for survivors. She indicated that the fire "spread laterally throughout the pile", making it difficult to isolate the source. Officials said rescuers were in the tower's heavily damaged underground parking garage, under constantly changing conditions. Levine Cava advised that "No further victims have been found, as you've heard. The numbers are the same as they were yesterday; 127 have been accounted for... One hundred and 59 unaccounted for. Four confirmed dead." Later that afternoon, the official toll was revised without elaboration to five dead and 156 missing.

Surfside Mayor Burkett advised residents of the Champlain Towers North building, located about 500 ft (150 m) north of the fallen structure, to evacuate with Federal Emergency Management Agency (FEMA) assistance "pending a thorough structural investigation", noting that the North and South buildings had been constructed by the same developer at about the same time, and likely using similar plans and materials. He did not immediately order the evacuation of the building or declare it unsafe. By late afternoon, voluntary evacuations were occurring at both Champlain Tower North and Champlain Tower East.

Florida officials announced that THOR, a 1,000 sq ft (93 m^{2}) mobile command center, was being deployed from Escambia County to help coordinate teams and operations. THOR, which includes cellular, satellite, and VOIP wireless systems and UHF and VHF radio systems, with built-in generators, was deployed for at least 10 days.

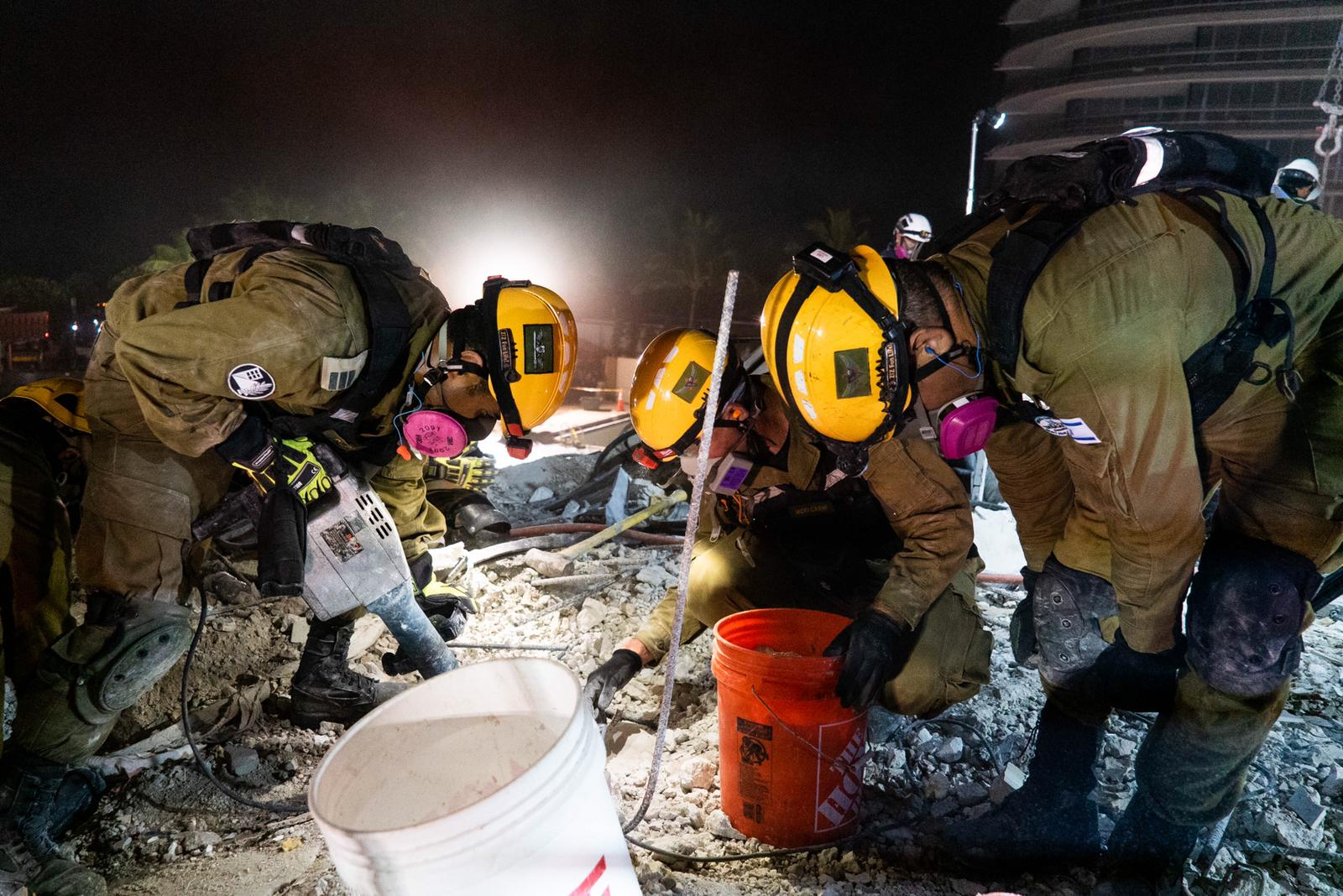
Israeli units assist in the search

On June 27, FEMA administrator Deanne Criswell announced that the US Army Corps of Engineers, which has significant experience with complex construction, demolition, stabilization, and forensic engineering projects, was providing onsite assistance. A search-and-rescue team from the Israeli Defense Forces' Home Front Command arrived in the morning, along with a six-person psycho-trauma unit from the Israel-based United Hatzalah including the K9 AACR therapy unit (with a first response therapy dog and her therapist handler), and members of ZAKA, a volunteer team that specializes in rescues and gathering body parts for Jewish burial. In the evening, Mayor Levine Cava said that nine people had been confirmed dead and 152 were missing. Four more names were released later that night, leaving only one of those confirmed dead not publicly identified. Two of the victims named were Venezuelan nationals.

On June 28, an additional fatality was confirmed, bringing the number of dead to 10, with 151 people still missing. Miami-Dade Fire Rescue Chief Ray Jadallah stressed that, while the operation entered its fifth day, the effort was still focused on the search for and potential rescue of survivors rather than shifting to recovery. In the afternoon, Levine Cava announced that an eleventh body had been found, reducing the number of missing to 150. The names of three additional victims were released later in the evening, making all of the 11 known fatalities then publicly identified. An international nonprofit group of volunteers trained in Israel called Cadena International (cadena being a Spanish word meaning "chain") was assisting the rescue mission.

The Miami Marlins, along with the Miami Marlins Foundation, created the Marlins Surfside Relief Fund. Matching $50,000 donations were made by Marlins majority owner and chairman, along with additional monies.

On June 29, Mayor Levine Cava reported that no more survivors or victims had been found, but that 210 search and rescue workers were on site, each working 12-hour shifts. Workers were being medically evaluated regularly to ensure their fitness to work at the site. A massive fire deep in the rubble pile, which had hampered search and rescue efforts since the collapse, was finally extinguished. Small, radio-controlled robots equipped with thermal sensors and 360-degree cameras were being deployed to assist in search and recovery efforts. President Biden was expected to visit the site on July 1, having not done so earlier to avoid disrupting rescue operations.

In the evening, Levine Cava advised that 12 people had been confirmed dead and 149 were missing. Levine Cava said that authorities would audit the names of the missing to ensure none are duplicates, particularly because of provided Hebrew names. Miami-Dade Fire Chief Alan Cominsky said 3,000,000 lb (1,400 t) of concrete had been removed from the site of the collapse. He said rescue workers would not reenter the west section of the building facing Collins Avenue, which was still standing, because it was unstable, making it too dangerous to go in. Rescuers could not enter a large area under the rubble on the eastern side of the site because of the same risk.

Florida Division of Emergency Management Director Kevin Guthrie and Miami-Dade Fire Chief Cominsky requested that FEMA deploy an additional Urban Search and Rescue Task Force team, anticipating that emergency response to the 2021 Atlantic hurricane season would otherwise have an adverse impact on the number of rescue and recovery personnel available for deployment at Surfside.

On June 30, an additional six bodies were found, including the wife and two children of a man whose body was found on June 26. This brought the death toll to 18 and reduced the number of missing to 145. In the afternoon, the rescuers discovered void spaces, including one described as "a big tunnel", in the rubble.

On July 1, search and rescue efforts were halted at the site at approximately 2:00 a.m. due to concerns that the western portion of the structure, which had not collapsed, was increasingly likely to do so, creating unsafe conditions for workers. President Biden visited the site after meeting with Governor DeSantis, Mayor Levine Cava, other elected leaders, and uniformed first responders in a conference room at the nearby St. Regis Bal Harbour resort. Biden suggested that the federal government could possibly cover the full cost of the first 30 days of rescue and recovery efforts. Concern also mounted that Tropical Storm Elsa could make landfall in south Florida, further destabilizing the standing portion of the structure and the debris field and interfering with rescue operations. The search resumed in the early evening after a 15-hour delay, and authorities announced the identity of an additional fatality, leaving one victim publicly unidentified.

The U.S. National Institute of Standards and Technology (NIST), which sent scientists and engineers to the site on June 25 under the authority of the National Construction Safety Team Act, announced that it would launch a full investigation into the collapse, with an eye to determining best practices to prevent similar disasters in the future. Debbie Wasserman Schultz, the U.S. representative from Florida's 23rd congressional district which includes Surfside, tweeted, "There are millions of high-rise condo units like those in Champlain Towers all across Florida... The NIST investigation is a major announcement and will be key to learning not only the cause of the tragedy in Surfside, but the potential danger posed to other structures across FL."

On July 2, the bodies of two more victims were found in the wreckage, bringing the known death toll to 20. The mayor revised the number of missing downward to 128, explaining that officials "originally received a report [regarding] a potentially missing person... That report was only marked as one person, but when the detectives were able to reach and verify... we discovered that there are in fact, several family members who could have been [ac]counted for... and now we can mark them as safe."

Due to the large influx of search and rescue personnel, officials, and investigators from around the country and outside the US, and a resulting shortage of hotel rooms, accommodations were being provided to some workers on a cruise ship, Royal Caribbean Group's Explorer of the Seas, docked at PortMiami.

At an evening news conference, Mayor Levine Cava announced the recovery of two additional bodies, bringing the death toll to 22. The mayor then ordered the remaining structure to be demolished as soon as it was feasible. Ongoing structural engineering assessments indicated that the standing portion of the structure was dangerously unstable, presenting a hazard to rescue and recovery teams working on site. She said the demolition would "take, most likely, weeks".

A Chilean man, first cousin of Chilean Air Force general Alberto Bachelet and uncle to the general's daughter Michelle Bachelet (who served as President of Chile from 2006 to 2010 and 2014 to 2018), and his Filipino American wife, a retired senior budget officer at the International Monetary Fund, were formally identified by authorities on Friday night among four previously recovered victims.

On July 3, two more bodies were found at the site, bringing the known death toll to 24, and the number of missing was revised downward to 121. Demolition of the remaining structure was moved to an earlier date, due to Tropical Storm Elsa, which was expected to arrive in Florida the following week. The search was suspended as a result. Rescuers used visual searches, thermal cameras, drones, and animal traps to try to locate pets left behind in the standing portion of the building, but did not find any.

On July 4, authorities announced that the still-standing western portion of Champlain Towers South would be demolished by Controlled Demolition, Inc. between 10:00 p.m. EDT Sunday night and 3:00 a.m. EDT Monday morning, after accelerating planning and placement of explosives in the building's foundation to complete the demolition prior to the arrival of Hurricane Elsa (then a tropical storm). The controlled demolition was expected to cause the standing structure to collapse mostly into the existing footprint of the building, with debris outside that perimeter expected to fall on the west (Collins Avenue) side to avoid disturbing the existing search and rescue zone on the east. The search for survivors of the initial collapse was set to resume almost immediately after the demolition was completed.

A petition with over 18,000 people was signed to halt the demolition plans until all pets were found in the standing portion of the building. An hour before demolition, a county judge denied an attorney's emergency motion to delay demolition and allow people to retrieve their pets.

The demolition took place at approximately 10:30 p.m. EDT on July 4, and the search for survivors resumed 20 minutes later.

On July 6, the death toll continued to increase as workers searched portions of the rubble that they had previously not been able to access. At a morning news conference, Mayor Levine Cava said there are "only around 70 [people] that we can confirm were in the building at the time of collapse", acknowledging doubt about the official estimate of 113 missing. Tropical Storm Elsa increased in strength in the Straits of Florida north of Cuba, prompting authorities to predict that it would be a Category 1 hurricane when it made landfall along Florida's west coast.

In the late afternoon, officials announced that an additional 12 bodies had been located since the search resumed after the demolition of the western portion of the structure on Sunday, including 4 on Tuesday. This brought the death toll to 36, with as many as 109 people still considered missing. Of the 36 confirmed dead, 29 had been publicly identified.

On July 7, in a private morning briefing with families, and a later briefing for reporters, authorities announced the recovery of an additional 10 bodies, the largest number thus far found in any 24-hour period. This brought the number of known deaths to 46. According to Mayor Levine Cava, 94 were still believed missing. Miami-Dade Fire Chief Jadallah said that families of 32 of the victims had been notified, and stated that "we haven't transitioned" to a purely recovery operation, as would occur when rescue of additional survivors was deemed no longer possible. He said they had so far not detected any voids in the rubble that would be likely to shelter survivors. Tropical Storm Elsa weakened and made landfall significantly north and west of Miami, greatly reducing its impact on the ongoing operations at the site versus earlier predictions.

Later in the day, authorities announced in another private briefing for family members that operations, now in their 14th day, were shifting from search and rescue to search and recovery.

=== Subsequent recovery operation ===
On July 9, the death toll rose to 79 after workers found an additional 15 victims. Binx, a cat who lived with the Gonzalez family on the ninth floor, was found alive. The survival of the cat gave relatives hope for additional human survivors. Seven more victims were found the following day, bringing the death toll to 86. 43 people remained missing.

On July 11, four more victims were found, bringing the death toll to 90, while the number of missing was revised to 31. On the following day, four more victims were found, bringing the death toll to 94, while the number of missing was revised to 22. One more body was found on July 13, bringing the count to 95.

On July 14, the number of missing was revised to 14. Another body was found, bringing the death toll to 96. On July 15, the total confirmed deaths rose to 97, with all but seven positively identified. The number of missing persons was reduced to eight. On July 17, authorities positively identified 95 of the 97 recovered victims.

On July 23, the Miami-Dade fire department discontinued the recovery effort and left the area. Three days later, the final missing person was identified, leaving the final death count at 98, and an unborn child.

== Response ==
On June 25, the National Institute of Standards and Technology (NIST) assigned a team of scientists and engineers to investigate the collapse and, on June 30, it launched a full technical investigation. On the following day, Miami-Dade mayor Levine Cava ordered an immediate audit of all high-rise buildings in Miami-Dade County older than 40 years and taller than five stories, and all those built by the developer of the Champlain Towers condominium complex, to be completed within the next 30 days. The editorial board of the Miami Herald called for a grand jury investigation of the collapse. Miami-Dade County state attorney Katherine Fernandez Rundle told the board, "Historically, this is the sort of thing grand jurors look at." The audit led to the immediate closure and evacuation of Crestview Towers, a 156-unit condominium building at North Miami Beach (7 mi (11 km) away from Champlain Towers South), following the submission of a report dated January 2021 but not received by the city until July 2021, which determined the structure was unsafe electrically and structurally. It also led to the closure of the historic Miami-Dade County Courthouse on July 9 after an engineer reported "safety concerns with various floors"; staff members were directed to work remotely.

The town of Surfside announced on June 27 it had contracted with Allyn Kilsheimer, founder and chief executive of KCE Structural Engineers, to study the partial collapse of the Champlain Towers South, assess the condition of adjacent and similar buildings, and provide geotechnical and original-design evaluations. The firm was involved in the forensic analysis of both the aftermath of the attack on the Pentagon during 9/11 and the Florida International University pedestrian bridge collapse in 2018. Surfside mayor Charles Burkett said that the town government would locate every document, including all correspondence sent or received, related to the Champlain Towers South building and post it on its web site in the interest of public transparency.

On July 5, The New York Times published an in-depth report saying that the collapse of Champlain Towers South prompted a review of hundreds of older high-rises in southeast Florida, as the management of other buildings "ignored or delayed action on serious maintenance issues". The article includes three annotated color-coded maps identifying buildings under scrutiny due to their date of construction and height. The Times also reported that the chief building official in Surfside, Ross Prieto, had reassured residents in 2018 that the tower appeared to be in "good shape," despite having been made aware of a report warning of critical damage to the building's structure.

On July 14, the Miami-Dade Police Department released 911 calls from the collapsed Champlain Towers South.

== Aftermath ==
In what it termed a show of respect for victims and their families, the City of Miami Beach canceled its annual Fire on the Fourth festival, which was scheduled to be held blocks away at 72nd Street and Collins Avenue at the North Beach Bandshell. Other Independence Day events were canceled in the metro Miami area, both to show respect to those affected by the collapse and to avoid worsening an already bad traffic situation because of road closures and detours associated with rescue efforts in Surfside.

=== Removal of debris ===
Some of the structural elements from the rubble were transported to a warehouse at an undisclosed location for analysis and testing by NIST. Additional debris, including concrete, personal belongings, and damaged cars from the parking garage, was transported to an empty field near the interchange of Interstate 95 and Florida's Turnpike (SR 91), approximately 10 miles (16 km) from the building collapse.

=== Redevelopment ===
By July 7, with the emergency response only just transitioning from rescue to recovery, discussions were already underway about the future use of the site. Some called for it to become a memorial park rather than be redeveloped for housing. On July 14, Miami-Dade Circuit Judge Michael Hanzman approved the sale of the property to developers, on the condition that proceeds be used to benefit the victims and their families.

The site of the collapse was sold in May 2022 for $120 million to Dubai-based developer Damac, owned by billionaire Hussain Sajwani. Damac was the only bidder in the auction conducted by Avison Young, the commercial real estate firm appointed by the court. The new properties will be branded as Cavalli luxury residences. Damac has proposed designs by Zaha Hadid Architects for the site.

=== Legal action ===
On June 24, 2021, the day of the collapse, a lawsuit was filed in Miami Dade Circuit Court by a resident of the building against the Champlain Towers South Condominium Association, seeking $5 million in damages "due to defendant's acts and omissions and their failure to properly protect the lives and property of plaintiff and class members".

On July 2, the Champlain Towers South condominium board issued a statement to the press following a judge's decision directing a receiver to release emergency assistance funds to residents of the building. The full statement read:

The surviving members of the Champlain Towers South Condominium Association board have concluded that, in the best interest of all concerned parties, an independent Receiver should be appointed to oversee the legal and claims process. The collapse of Champlain Towers South is an unspeakable tragedy that has devastated our community, our neighbors, and our friends. We are grieving and our hearts ache for those who have been lost and for their families. They have our deepest condolences. Our profound gratitude goes out to the emergency rescue personnel – professionals and volunteers alike – who have been working around the clock. We know that answers will take time as part of a comprehensive investigation and we will continue to work with city, state, local, and federal officials in their rescue efforts, and to understand the causes of this tragedy.

On July 16, 2021, the trial court appointed class counsel, led by co-chair lead counsel Harley Tropin and Rachel Furst, to represent two subclasses of victims – those who had lost family members or suffered a personal injury as a result of the collapse, and those who had suffered only an economic loss on account of the destruction of their apartment unit.

On August 16, 2021, class counsel filed an amended consolidated class action complaint on behalf of these classes of victims, naming only the Champlain Towers South Condominium Association as a defendant and alleging the Association's negligence in its failure to adequately maintain and repair the building. After initial investigation into additional contributing causes of the collapse, on November 16, 2021, class counsel filed a second amended complaint, bringing a class action lawsuit against various entities responsible for the development, maintenance, and repair of the Champlain Towers South property and the neighboring development located at 8701 Collins Avenue, known as Eighty Seven Park. The named defendants were 8701 Collins Development, LLC; Terra Group, LLC; Terra World Investments, LLC; John Moriarty & Associates of Florida, Inc.; NV5, Inc.; DeSimone Consulting Engineers, LLC; Champlain Towers South Condominium Association, Inc.; Morabito Consultants, Inc.; and Becker & Poliakoff, P.A. The trial court denied motions to dismiss this class action complaint, and it was amended again on March 10, 2022, to add Stantec Architecture Inc.; Geosonics, Inc.; Florida Civil, Inc.; and 8701 Collins Avenue Condominium Association, Inc., as additional defendants.

On June 23, 2022, one day before the first anniversary of the collapse, a $1.02 billion settlement was approved by Judge Michael Hanzman for victims of the collapse. The defendants in the case and other targets that were never named as defendants chose to settle quickly to avoid long delays from litigation and exposure to liability. Roughly half the settlement amount came from a single company, Securitas AB, that was never named in the lawsuit, in relation to the on-duty security guard not triggering a building-wide alarm before she exited the building.

In the years after the collapse, insurance rates for condominiums in the area increased several-fold.

== Possible causes ==
=== Saltwater corrosion of rebar ===
A 2018 inspection performed by the engineering firm Morabito Consultants pointed out a "major error" in the construction of the pool deck, whereby the waterproofing layer was not sloped. Rainwater that collected on the waterproofing therefore remained until it could evaporate. Over the years, the concrete slabs below the pool deck had been severely damaged by this water. The report noted the waterproofing below the pool deck was beyond its useful life and needed to be completely removed and replaced. The firm wrote that "failure to replace waterproofing in the near future will cause the extent of the concrete deterioration to expand exponentially", and that the repair would be "extremely expensive". The ceiling slabs of the parking garage, which sat below the pool deck, showed several sizable cracks and cases of exposed reinforcing bar or rebar from spalling.

In October 2020, initial repairs around the pool could not be completed because, according to engineers, the deterioration had penetrated so deeply that repairs would have risked destabilizing that area.

On April 9, 2021, a letter to residents had outlined a $15-million remedial-works program, noting that concrete deterioration was accelerating and had become "much worse" since the 2018 report. Although the roof repairs pursuant to the consultant's report were underway at the time of the collapse, remedial concrete works had not yet begun.

According to Surfside town commissioner Eliana Salzhauer, at the time of the disaster, the building had been undergoing inspection for its 40-year recertification, which typically takes one year to complete. Morabito Consultants, the engineering firm who performed the 2018 inspection, were retained by the condominium association to perform the inspection for the condominium's 40-year recertification.

In addition to the freshwater infiltrations from the defectively constructed pool deck, a maintenance manager had reported a possible excessive ingress of salt water, which can cause more aggressive spalling.

=== Water leaks ===
On June 28, 2021, the Miami Herald published images from an anonymous pool contractor, who claimed that they showed portions of the pool equipment room, located next to the pool on the south side of the underground garage, just 36 hours before the collapse. According to that contractor, the images showed standing water, cracking concrete, and severely corroded rebar next to the pool.

On June 30, WLS-TV in Chicago publicized a bystander's video of water pouring into the parking garage from above near its entrance, and apparent concrete rubble lying on the floor, reportedly taken at 1:18 a.m., seven minutes before the north-central portion of the building collapsed.

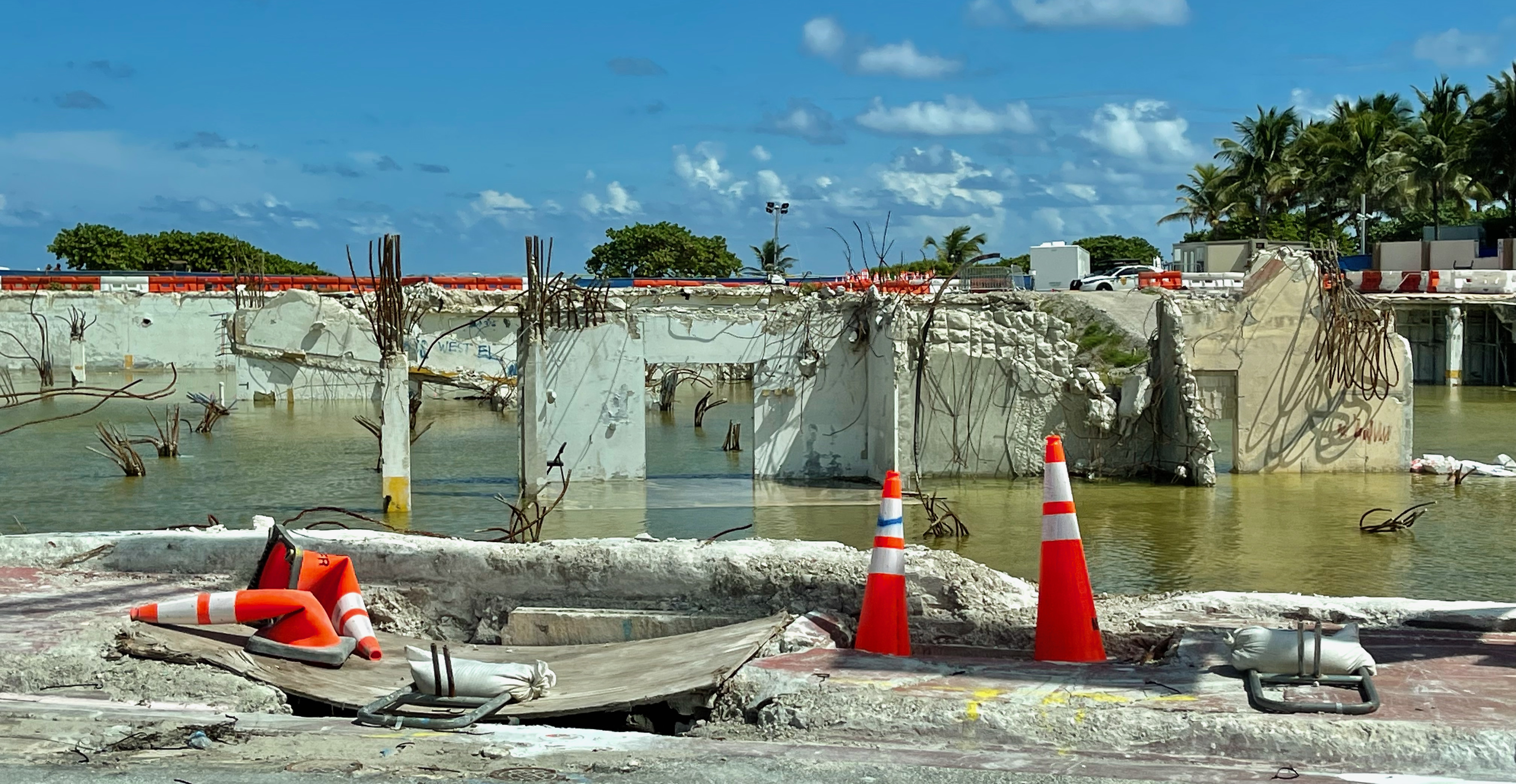
Remains of the collapsed condominium in October 2021

=== Inadequate construction ===
On July 3, 2021, The New York Times reported that investigators had found less rebar than specified in the building's construction plans in its footing neck and starter columns. The report cautioned that some may have been dislodged in the collapse, and that reduction of rebar alone would not necessarily cause failure because steel requirements can change during the construction process, and designs often specify more than is strictly needed as a safety precaution. Construction contractors using less rebar than required is a very common cause of structural failure. There is some evidence that proper inspections were not performed during and after construction.

On June 27, 2021, the Miami Herald reported on the consensus of six engineering experts it interviewed. Based on publicly available evidence, the experts believed that a structural column or concrete slab beneath the pool deck likely gave way, causing the deck to collapse into the garage below. This formed a crater beneath the bulky midsection of the tower, which then caved in. This is a type of progressive collapse, in which one structural part gives way, destabilizing and removing support from other parts, which in turn collapse and rapidly remove structural support. The report includes evidence that moments before the building collapsed, a resident of a fourth-floor unit called her husband to say that a crater had appeared in the pool deck. She went missing in the collapse and was later found dead. A surviving resident also stated that part of the pool deck and street-level parking area had collapsed into the parking garage minutes before the collapse.

Corruption during construction has been cited by multiple local media sources as a potential contributing cause of the collapse.

=== Subsidence ===
Distinct from possible construction defects, an analysis of European Remote-Sensing Satellite data by Florida International University indicates that the building had been sinking during the 1990s at a significant rate of about two millimeters (0.079 in) per year. While 97 percent of Miami Beach had been stable, 1,555 of 18,949 points in Miami Beach had been sinking, at a rate of less than one millimeter (0.039 in) per year. A building collapse due to sinking is likely only if parts are sinking at different rates, creating tensions that weaken the structure, known as differential settlement. The researchers noted that other overbuilt areas were sinking at a significantly faster rate, such as on the artificial islands in Biscayne Bay – up to 3.8 mm (0.15 in) per year.

=== Damage caused by construction on adjacent site ===
On June 28, 2021, The New York Times reported that the secretary of the resident-led association that managed Champlain Towers South contacted the town building department in early 2019 about resident concerns that their building's structural integrity was affected by the construction next door at the Eighty Seven Park condo development. The project broke ground in early 2016 and was completed in late 2019. The Miami Herald also reported on the possible connection between the driving of sheet pilings during the construction of Eighty Seven Park and the collapse. No known engineering records suggest a connection between Eighty Seven Park construction and any damage at Champlain Towers.

=== Final NIST report ===
In June 2026, NIST released their technical findings on what caused the partial collapse. The team concluded the collapse began in early June 2021, when two connections between garage columns and the pool deck failed. The initial column failures caused cracks to grow and loads to redistribute in the pool deck columns over the next three weeks, leading to the transfer of those loads to adjacent slab-column connections that were not strong enough to support them. This led to the catastrophic collapse of the building on June 24 when two of the supporting columns in the middle part of the tower failed after being damaged by their connection to the pool deck being severed. They listed four primary contributing factors leading to the collapse: The structures had inadequate margins of safety, as the original design did not meet the building codes in force at the time of construction; and the structure, as built, did not follow the blueprints, reducing the margins against failure even further. Other factors cited by NIST included additions to the load carried by the columns in the garage by modifications and additions to the pool deck, and corrosion of the rebar within the concrete pillars and slabs. NIST ruled out vibration from the nearby construction, hurricanes, sinkholes, and construction on the roof as factors in the collapse.

== Impact ==
=== Pulitzer Prize ===
The collective 37-person staff of the Miami Herald received the 2022 Pulitzer Prize for Breaking News Reporting for its investigative reporting of the collapse and its causes.

=== Legislation ===
The Florida counties of Miami-Dade and Broward had a system of 40-year structural inspections from the mid-1970s, created in response to the DEA building collapse of August 1974 that claimed the lives of seven DEA agents. In Broward County, the recertification scheme was introduced in 2005 and became operative in January 2006. Some structures were exempted from the mandatory inspection provision in both the counties. This included:

1. Miami-Dade County: All single-family homes sized 2000 sq. ft. or less and with ten or fewer number of occupants.
2. Broward County: All single-family homes sized less than 3500 sq. ft.

The Florida Legislature passed condo reform legislation in a May 2022 special session as Senate Bill 4-D, addressing issues highlighted in the aftermath of the Surfside collapse. It was modeled on the 40-year recertification scheme. The bill creates a state-wide inspection program for condo buildings taller than three stories. Starting in 2025, the buildings will go through a milestone inspection certification process when reaching 30 years of age, or 25 years if the building is located within three miles of the coast, and will be inspected again every 10 years afterward. The inspection records must be posted online and shared with tenants, and condo associations will no longer be able to waive the requirement that they keep a reserve fund large enough to maintain the structural integrity of the building.

Also called the 30-year recertification inspection law of Florida, the milestone inspection scheme includes the following:

1. A 30-10 year recertification inspection for all buildings 3 stories or higher.
2. A 25-10 year recertification inspection for all buildings 3 stories or higher built within three miles of coastline.

Note: Buildings with Certificate of Occupancy issued on July 1, 1992 or before need to complete milestone inspection before December 31, 2024.

In June 2023, the Legislature passed an amendment to Senate Bill 4-D (2022). The amendment removes the 25-year requirement for milestone inspections for buildings within three miles of the coast and permits local jurisdictions to set the inspection requirement to 25 years versus 30 years. The bill also provided a building that reaches 30 years of age before December 31, 2024 to have a milestone inspection completed by the end of 2024.

=== Puerto Rico ===
After the collapse, the Puerto Rico Professional College of Engineers and Land Surveyors (Spanish: Colegio de Ingenieros y Agrimensores de Puerto Rico, CIAPR) sought to convince the Puerto Rican government (Note: According to CIAPR Earthquakes Commission president Félix L. Rivera, CIAPR spoke to Puerto Rican legislators about this. However, in the news article, no date was given nor any links to legal documents concerning this.) to legally adopt the International Property Maintenance Code of 2018 (IPMC 2018) and require periodic inspection and maintenance of buildings. CIAPR Earthquake Commission president Félix L. Rivera cited concerns that "many buildings [in Puerto Rico] are built on sandy terrain, in the maritime-land zone, exposed to water and corrosion."

== See also ==
- 1031 Canal
- Florida International University pedestrian bridge collapse
- Harbor Cay condominium collapse
- Hyatt Regency walkway collapse
- List of building and structure collapses
- Ronan Point collapse
- Sampoong Department Store collapse
- Structural integrity and failure
