= 2000 Commonwealth Avenue collapse (1971) =

Construction accident in Boston, Massachusetts, U.S.

- Building after collapse
- Date: January 25, 1971
- Location: Brighton, Boston, Massachusetts; 42.33946°N 71.15859°W
- Cause: Building collapse due to lack of shoring and low concrete strength
- Outcome: 4 construction workers killed, 30 injured

On January 25, 1971, a luxury condominium building under construction at 2000 Commonwealth Avenue in Brighton, Boston, Massachusetts, collapsed, killing 4 construction workers and injuring 30 others.

== History ==
The construction of the 2000 Commonwealth Avenue building began in autumn 1969. The building that collapsed was to have contained 133 condominium apartments. The collapse occurred the day before the building's scheduled "top out" day.

== Collapse ==
The building collapsed while concrete was being poured on the top floor of the building. Two-thirds of the building was destroyed by a progressive collapse. Approximately 100 men were working in or around the building.

A difficult and dangerous search by rescue workers, involving days of digging, led to the recovery from the building's basement of the bodies of the four workers who died in the collapse. The search was postponed for 36 hours while the Boston building commissioner and other experts confirmed the stability of the remaining structure, a delay that angered the coworkers and family members of the missing men.

The four workers killed were:

- Ciriaco DiIorio, 45, laborer, from Roslindale, Boston, Massachusetts
- Michael Papasedero, 27, foreman, from Dedham, Massachusetts
- Daniel Tintindo, 41, welder, from Mansfield, Massachusetts
- James Cingolani, 26, Tintindo's helper, from Quincy, Massachusetts

Papasedero was last seen after the collapse had begun entering the basement garage, where Tintindo and Cingolani, members of his crew, had been working, to search for them.

== Cause ==
Contributory causes of the collapse included lack of quality control and inspections, concrete weakened when left unprotected from cold weather, deficiencies in shoring and reinforcing bars and overly high construction loads on the roof slab. A commission of inquiry concluded that the primary causes of the collapse were lack of shoring and low concrete strength. On July 23, 1972, Controlled Demolition, Inc., imploded the unfinished building after the completion of the recovery effort.
