= 1974 Miami DEA building collapse =

Catastrophic building collapse in Miami

- Date: August 5, 1974; 51 years ago
- Time: Approximately 10:24 a.m. EDT (UTC−4)
- Location: 25.786°N 80.191°W
- Deaths: 7
- Injuries: 15

On August 5, 1974, at 10:24 a.m. EDT, a federal office building housing the US Drug Enforcement Administration (DEA) Miami Field Division office in downtown Miami, Florida, United States, collapsed after the roof caved in, causing the deaths of seven DEA employees and injuries to 15 others.

Initial speculation centered on a theory that the cars parked on a six-inch-thick slab of concrete on the roof were too heavy, causing the collapse. Investigations later concluded that resurfacing of the parking lot combined with salt in the sand had eroded the supporting steel structure of the building, weakening it catastrophically.

== Background ==
The building had been constructed in 1925, making it 49 years old at the time of the collapse. It had undergone a full engineering inspection in 1968 before the DEA office was cleared to move into the building. The structure underwent some renovations in 1971, the same year that the DEA moved into the building. It was located near the current site of the Adrienne Arsht Center for the Performing Arts at 1201 NE 2nd Avenue, Miami.

In 1974, between 125 and 150 people worked in the building, although not all were on site when the building collapsed.

== Collapse ==
The collapse occurred at 10:24 a.m. EDT on Monday, August 5, 1974 when the roof caved in, triggering a partial collapse. People in the building thought an explosion or earthquake had occurred. Employees working in the part of the building that did not collapse were quickly told to evacuate the building. Seven people were confirmed dead due to the collapse, and 15 were injured and treated at Jackson Memorial Hospital.

== Aftermath ==
Firemen worked through the night to rescue survivors and to recover bodies from the wreckage. Evidence and records related to pending cases were locked in vaults beneath the rubble, keeping them safe. Rescue operations had to proceed slowly because of the danger of a partially-destroyed wall that threatened collapse, potentially burying rescuers and survivors.

Initial speculation centered on the cars parked on the roof of the structure overloading the concrete slab they were parked on and causing the collapse, with the number of cars at first being reported as 80 and then 57. Former Miami Herald reporter Edna Buchanan wrote in her book The Corpse Had a Familiar Face that the Miami DEA had recently started parking cars seized from drug dealers in the rooftop garage. However, later investigations found that the supporting steel structure of the building had been eroded and weakened by resurfacing of the parking lot combined with salt in the sand. The concrete slab poured on the roof of the building in 1971 may also have partially contributed to the collapse.

Examining the six tons of rubble left by the collapse, Miami-Dade County engineer John Pistorino concluded that concrete buildings in South Florida have particular risks, as salt in the aggregate rock used when making concrete can corrode reinforcing steel due to the area's humid climate and salty air. This corrosion can expand and crack the concrete, causing it to lose structural capacity. The collapse led to Miami-Dade County's mandatory 40-year recertification program for buildings with the hope of avoiding another such collapse. The 40 Year Structural Inspections are a part of these recertification programs.

== See also ==
- List of structural failures and collapses
- Surfside condominium collapse
- Structural integrity and failure
