= List of television stations in North Dakota =

This is a list of broadcast television stations that are licensed in the U.S. state of North Dakota.

== Full-power ==
- Stations are arranged by media market served and channel position.

Full-power television stations in North Dakota
Media market	Station	Channel	Primary affiliation(s)	Notes	Refs
Bismarck	KBME-TV	3	PBS	(Note: Satellite of KFME.)	
Bismarck	KFYR-TV	5	NBC, Fox on 5.2		
Bismarck	KXMB-TV	12	The CW		
Bismarck	KBMY	17	ABC, CBS on 17.2, MyNetworkTV on 17.3		
Bismarck	KNDB	26	Heroes & Icons		
Dickinson	KXMA-TV	2	The CW	(Note: Satellite of KXMB-TV.)	
Dickinson	KQCD-TV	7	NBC, Fox on 7.2	(Note: Satellite of KFYR-TV.)	
Dickinson	KDSE	9	PBS		
Fargo	KRDK-TV	4	Cozi TV and MyNetworkTV	(Note: Licensed to Valley City, North Dakota.)	
Fargo	WDAY-TV	6	ABC, Independent on 6.3, Ion Television on 6.4		
Fargo	KJRR	7	Fox	(Note: Licensed to Jamestown, North Dakota.) (Note: Satellite of KVRR.)	
Fargo	KVLY-TV	11	NBC, CBS on 11.2		
Fargo	KFME	13	PBS		
Fargo	KVRR	15	Fox		
Fargo	KJRE	19	PBS	(Note: Licensed to Ellendale, North Dakota.)	
Grand Forks	KGFE	2	PBS		
Grand Forks	WDAZ-TV	8	ABC, Independent on 8.3, Ion Television on 8.4	(Note: Licensed to Devils Lake, North Dakota.) (Note: Semi-satellite of WDAY-TV.)	
Grand Forks	KMDE	25	PBS		
Grand Forks	KNGF	27	BEK Sports		
Minot	KSRE	6	PBS		
Minot	KMOT	10	NBC, Fox on 10.2	(Note: Semi-satellite of KFYR-TV.)	
Minot	KXMC-TV	13	The CW	(Note: Semi-satellite of KXMB-TV.)	
Minot	KMCY	14	ABC, CBS on 14.2, MyNetworkTV on 14.3	(Note: Semi-satellite of KBMY.)	
Minot	KNDM	24	Heroes & Icons	(Note: Semi-satellite of KNDB.)	
Williston	KWSE	4	PBS		
Williston	KUMV-TV	8	NBC, Fox on 8.2	(Note: Satellite of KMOT.)	
Williston	KXMD-TV	11	The CW	(Note: Satellite of KXMC-TV.)	
~Winnipeg, MB	KNRR	12	Fox	(Note: Licensed to Pembina, North Dakota.) (Note: Satellite of KBRR.)	

== Low-power ==
Low-power television stations in North Dakota
Media market	Station	Channel	Primary affiliation(s)	Notes	Refs
Bismarck	KXBK-LD	15	Various		
Bismarck	KRDN-LD	43	IBN Television		
Bismarck	K28MS-D	46	[Blank]		
Dickinson	K28QT-D	28	[Blank]		
Fargo	K22OG-D	22	Cozi TV		
Fargo	K25LY-D	25	Cozi TV		
Fargo	KXJB-LD	30	CBS, The CW on 30.2	(Note: Licensed to Horace, North Dakota.)	
Fargo	KFGX-LD	35	[Blank]		
Fargo	K15MR-D	51	Various		
Grand Forks	K18NT-D	17	3ABN		
Grand Forks	K31MP-D	31	Silent		
Minot	K18NW-D	18	[Blank]		
Minot	K21GQ-D	21	[Blank]		
Minot	K35MM-D	42	IBN Television		
Williston	K20PB-D	20	[Blank]		
Williston	K28QQ-D	40	[Blank]		

== Translators ==
Television station translators in North Dakota
Media market	Station	Channel	Translating	Notes	Refs
Bismarck	K35PO-D	35	KFYR-TV		
Fargo	K28MA-D	28	KXJB-LD	(Note: Licensed to Argusville, North Dakota.)	
Grand Forks	K30LR-D	30	KXJB-LD	(Note: Translating K28MA-D.)	

== Defunct ==
- KCND-TV Pembina (1960–1975)
- KCPM Grand Forks (2003–2014)
- KNOX-TV Grand Forks (1955–1964)
