= NBC North Dakota =

Network of NBC affiliates in North Dakota

NBC North Dakota is a network of four television stations that serve most of central and western North Dakota, along with parts of South Dakota and Montana. All four stations are dual NBC/Fox affiliates, and the flagship station is KFYR-TV in Bismarck. All four are owned by Gray Media. Sister station KVLY-TV in Fargo/Grand Forks is also considered a member of the network covering eastern North Dakota and northwestern Minnesota, but originates its own programming and newscasts. Fox programming is also not shown on KVLY-TV. KVLY's sister station CBS affiliate KXJB-LD is not available outside of the KVLY viewing area. In 2023 as part of a rebranding, all four stations rebranded under their respective call letters.

== Stations ==
The network consists of four stations in the Bismarck/Minot market and one in the Fargo/Grand Forks market:

Call sign	PSIP Channel	Digital Channel	Location	Status
KFYR-TV	5	31	Bismarck, ND	Flagship station of NBC North Dakota
KMOT	10	10	Minot, ND	Operate as semi-satellites of KFYR-TV
KQCD-TV	7	7	Dickinson, ND	Operate as semi-satellites of KFYR-TV
KUMV-TV	8	8	Williston, ND	Operates as a semi-satellite of KMOT
KVLY-TV	11	36	Fargo, ND	Considered part of NBC North Dakota, but airs its own programming and newscasts. Co-owned with sister CBS affiliate KXJB-LD.

The four Bismarck/Minot/Dickinson/Williston market stations all identify as separate stations in their own right, but KMOT and KQCD are reckoned as semi-satellites of KFYR, and KUMV is a semi-satellite of KMOT. They all air the same syndicated programming, but also air separate commercials for their respective cities. KVLY-TV originates its own programming and newscasts, as it is located in the separate Fargo/Grand Forks media market.

KMOT and KUMV air separate weeknight newscasts, and simulcast KFYR's other newscasts. The first 10 minutes of KUMV's newscasts simulcast KMOT, while KUMV fills the remaining 20 minutes. KQCD airs a time-shifted feed of KFYR in Mountain Time for most of the day, apart from station identifications and commercials.

The network was founded by the Meyer family of Bismarck, which signed on KFYR radio in 1925. KFYR-TV, North Dakota's second television station, signed on in 1953. Two years later, the Federal Communications Commission collapsed central and western North Dakota into one giant television market. The Meyers then signed on Williston's KUMV in 1957, having bought it from the local owners who had won the license. The two stations formed the "Meyer Television Network," with KFYR-TV as the flagship station. KMOT followed in 1958. KQCD was brought online in 1980, replacing a low-powered translator of KFYR-TV that had served Dickinson since the late 1960s.

The stations have always been NBC affiliates, though they all carried some ABC programming in off-hours until KBMY/KMCY signed on in 1986. Additionally, KUMV broke off to air occasional CBS programming until KXMD-TV signed on in 1969.

The Meyers owned the stations until 1997, when they sold their stations to Sunrise Television. Wicks Group bought the stations in 2002, and in turn sold its entire television group to Hoak Media in 2007. In turn, Hoak sold the majority of its stations, including the NBC North Dakota chain, to Gray Television in 2014.

Gray also owns KVLY-TV in Fargo; KVLY has been co-owned with the NBC North Dakota stations since 1995, when it was purchased by Meyer Broadcasting. KVLY shares news stories and sports programming with NBC North Dakota. KVLY's sister station, CBS affiliate KXJB-LD, simulcasts KVLY's newscasts and is housed in the same studio as KVLY, while the other NBC North Dakota stations air Fox on their second digital subchannels after purchasing the intellectual property of KNDX/KXND (now KNDB/KNDM) in 2013.
