= KCPM (TV) =

Television station in Grand Forks, North Dakota (2003–2020)

- Grand Forks, North Dakota; United States
- Channels: Digital: 27 (UHF)
- Branding: KCPM (localized); Central Plains Media (regional)

Programming
- Affiliations: UPN (2003–2006); MyNetworkTV (2006–2014, 2018)

Ownership
- Owner: Central Plains Media; (G.I.G. of North Dakota, LLC)
- Sister stations: KCPO-LD

History
- First air date: 2003
- Last air date: December 15, 2014 (loss of transmitter site); March 9, 2020 (license cancellation)
- Former channel numbers: Analog: 27 (UHF, 2003–2009)
- Call sign meaning: Central Plains Media

Technical information
- Licensing authority: FCC
- Facility ID: 86208
- ERP: 11.1 kW
- HAAT: 55.8 m (183 ft)
- Transmitter coordinates: 47°57′45.2″N 97°3′13.1″W

Links
- Public license information: Public file; LMS

KCPM (channel 27) was a television station licensed to Grand Forks, North Dakota, United States, which served eastern North Dakota and northwestern Minnesota. Owned by Chuck Poppen's Central Plains Media of Sioux Falls, South Dakota, it was last affiliated with MyNetworkTV. KCPM's transmitter was located on the Midco cable headend tower northwest of East Grand Forks, Minnesota.

The station's broadcast signal had only been on the air intermittently since 2014, with a local cable provider effectively acting as the station's engineer to retain a quality signal for its system.

KCPM operated as a semi-satellite of independent station KCPO-LP in Sioux Falls, although it aired separate commercials, station identifications and sometimes different syndicated programming due to Federal Communications Commission (FCC) market regulations and KCPM's MyNetworkTV affiliation. KCPM also claimed to carry Retro TV on their third digital subchannel since the summer of 2015.

On March 9, 2020, the FCC canceled KCPM's license and deleted its call sign for failure to transmit from authorized facilities for the past 12 months, along with allegations it had never properly acquired or reported a new transmitter site after December 2014, nor logged their programming and operations.

== History ==
KCPM was a UPN affiliate launched to fill the void when Minneapolis–Saint Paul's KMSP-TV was being dropped by area cable television systems due to its affiliation switch from UPN to Fox. Originally, KCPM was to go on air in 2000, but the station construction permit was sold to Catamount Broadcasting of Fargo and became KXJC-LP. KCPM eventually launched in 2003, at full power on channel 27.

KCPM was the first full-time UPN affiliate in North Dakota. At the time, UPN programming was being carried after primetime by former Fox affiliates KNDX and KXND. KVRR had not done the same since 1998, as UPN affiliate KMSP-TV was commonly available on cable in the Fargo–Grand Forks market.

The call sign KCPM was previously used in California by current NBC affiliate KNVN from 1985 to 1998.

=== MyNetworkTV ===
On January 24, 2006, the UPN and WB networks announced they would merge. The newly combined network would be called The CW, the letters representing the first initial of its corporate parents CBS (the parent company of UPN) and the Warner Bros. unit of Time Warner. The merger would take effect on-the-air on September 18, 2006. In response to the merger, News Corporation (the owner of Fox) launched another network called MyNetworkTV on September 5, 2006.

KCPM rejected The CW and affiliated with MyNetworkTV. In September 2005, KCPM replaced the UPN logo with the logo of Central Plains Media. The new KCPM MyNetworkTV logo was introduced in August 2006, and KCPM dropped UPN entirely on the day MyNetworkTV launched. WDAY-TV launched a digital subchannel to carry The CW (later also carried on WDAZ-TV), which replaced cable-only station WBFG on September 18, 2006.

=== Scrutiny and license deletion ===
The station filed a notice to the FCC to cease terrestrial operations on February 15, 2008, and filed notice on May 22, 2008, to suspend operations. According to FCC records, the station's owners suspended operations on financial grounds, due to the economy. According to reports from viewers, KCPM remained available on cable, although not over the air. By November 2008, the station resumed over-the-air broadcasting after the FCC rejected the notice to cease terrestrial operations. On June 12, 2009, the station turned off its analog signal because of financial hardship. On May 10, 2010, the station filed a new application to operate at 11.1 kW and resumed broadcasting over-the-air in June 2010.

On December 15, 2014, KCPM lost access to its licensed transmitter site; it also had inadvertently failed to file a timely application for renewal of its license that same year. While the station claimed to have resumed operations from January 27 to February 3, 2018, the FCC later found it had done so with a "temporary transmitter" that it had not authorized.

On February 11, 2018, it was announced that KCPM would be sold to Gray Television. The purchase price was not disclosed. This would have made KCPM a sister station to NBC affiliate KVLY-TV (channel 11) and low-power CBS affiliate KXJB-LD (channel 30). Gray pledged to rebuild and upgrade KCPM's transmitter to provide full-market coverage and reserved the call letters KXQK for use upon taking control.

However, the sale application attracted scrutiny as to whether KCPM had broadcast a signal since losing its transmitter site in 2014. The Telecommunications Act of 1996 requires the FCC to delete the license of any station that does not broadcast for a year, either from its licensed transmitter or an interim one authorized by special temporary authority. Richard Sjoberg, owner of a cable system in Thief River Falls, Minnesota, stated in an affidavit that station management contacted him to arrange carriage early in its existence, but he often found the off-air signal to be unusable even in Grand Forks proper. Upon approaching G.I.G. about installing a direct fiber feed, they agreed and, unusually, asked if he would also help perform maintenance on the station; he conducted basic facilities maintenance but felt unqualified to work on the transmitter, and was unconcerned with its state due to the fiber feed. He also claimed that G.I.G. personally asked him to disconnect the transmitter in October 2015, and he sent a crew that removed the antenna and feedline. They discovered that the transmitter had already been shut off by a tripped circuit breaker, leading Sjoberg to conclude the station's over-the-air signal had been inactive since then and for some time beforehand. Local broadcast engineer Jacob Bechtold and KRDK-TV owner Ravi Kapur also claimed that they had never received KCPM's signal, despite each conducting regular monitoring of the television band for years prior to their 2018 affidavits. Kapur additionally stated that Poppen told him in 2017 the KCPM transmitter had "burned up" in the past. The matter of its temporary transmitter thus rendered moot, on March 9, 2020, the FCC determined that KCPM had not made a licensed broadcast in one year, canceled its license, and dismissed all pending applications.

On April 17, 2020, Gray filed a petition with the FCC to restore the station's license, arguing by re-tuning KVLY's backup transmitter and relaunching KCPM using that equipment at a minimum price without further tower work, the station could provide extended coverage of the local impact of the COVID-19 pandemic, local telecourses from the area's school districts, and extended public affairs programming; the petition also mentions a possibility of affiliating KCPM-DT1 as a primary affiliate of Gray's subchannel network Circle (as of late, Gray has pushed their MyNetworkTV affiliates to carry the service's programming in the graveyard slot in a number of markets, reducing it to a secondary affiliation), along with providing expanded news coverage specific to Grand Forks after WDAZ-TV discontinued their Grand Forks newscasts in 2018 to only carry those of Fargo's WDAY-TV.

The FCC denied the request on May 22, saying it did not agree that the pandemic "would justify us either acting out of accordance with longstanding precedent or allowing G.I.G. to benefit from its longstanding failure to serve its community. This is especially so in light of the fact that the effects of this transaction will extend well beyond this crisis, as the acquisition by Gray would require a permanent, as opposed to temporary, waiver of the Local Television Ownership Rule," which restricts the number of stations one entity may own in a market. Ravi Kapur's KRDK-TV began airing MyNetworkTV programming in May 2021.

On June 7, 2022, the FCC auctioned dozens of unused television channel allotments, including channel 27 at Grand Forks; BEK Sports Network, Inc. won the bidding with a $6.4 million offer. KNGF signed on the air in February 2023.

== Technical information ==
Subchannel of KCPM
Channel	Res.	Short name	Programming
27.1	480i	KCPM-DT	MyNetworkTV (4:3)

=== Analog-to-digital conversion ===
KCPM shut down its analog signal, over UHF channel 27, on February 17, 2009, and "flash-cut" its digital signal into operation on UHF channel 27. Because its original construction permit was granted after the FCC finalized the digital television allotment plan on April 21, 1997, the station did not receive a companion channel for a digital television station.

=== Translators ===
KCPM was rebroadcast on the following translators (low-power rebroadcasters):

- KCPM-LP (channel 2) Fargo (construction permit for digital on channel 33, never built; license canceled on July 9, 2024)
- K35HT (channel 35) Jamestown (construction permit, never built)

KCPM-LP was previously KVNJ-LP.
