= Quest (American TV network) =

American digital multicast television network

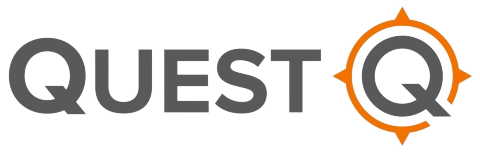
- Type: Digital multicast television network
- Country: United States
- Broadcast area: Nationwide via OTA digital television
- Affiliates: List of affiliates
- Headquarters: Atlanta, Georgia

Programming
- Picture format: 480i (SDTV)

Ownership
- Owner: Tegna Inc., a subsidiary of Nexstar Media Group
- Key people: Brian Weiss (president / general manager); John Ford (Head of Programming); Ned Simon (Head of Production and Network Operations)
- Sister channels: True Crime Network; Nexstar: Antenna TV; NewsNation; Rewind TV; The CW; Food Network (31%); Cooking Channel (31%)

History
- Founded: November 7, 2017; 9 years ago
- Launched: January 29, 2018; 8 years ago
- Founder: Lonnie Cooper

Links
- Website: www.questtv.com

Quest is an American digital multicast television network owned by the Tegna subsidiary of Nexstar Media Group. It specializes in travel, historical, science, and adventure-focused documentary and reality series aimed at adults between the ages of 25 and 54.

The network, which broadcasts in 480i standard definition, is available in several large and mid-sized markets via digital subchannel affiliations with broadcast television stations. Stations have the option of placing their Quest-affiliated subchannels on cable television providers serving their market (via existing carriage agreements for local broadcast stations) to provide additional local coverage.

== History ==
The formation of Quest was announced on November 7, 2017, as a partnership between Cooper Media (a company formed at that same time to serve as the owner of Quest and its sister network, Justice Network) and Tegna Inc. The network was given an expected launch date of January 2018. Tegna tapped several of its 46 owned or operated television stations to serve as the network's charter affiliates, in exchange for maintaining a minority ownership stake in the network.

The network was officially launched on January 29, 2018, at 6:00 p.m. Eastern Time with an episode ("Air Ambush") of the 2006–08 History series Dogfights as the network's inaugural program.

In May 2019, it was announced that Tegna would be acquiring both the Justice Network and Quest.

== Programming ==
Quest's program schedule consists of a mix of programs that originally aired on A&E, Discovery, History, Smithsonian, and truTV cable networks, as well as those which premiered in 3D (aired on Quest in traditional 2D) from the now-defunct DirecTV channel 3net:

- Bering Sea Gold
- Brojects
- Canadian Pickers
- Combat Dealers
- DragonflyTV Sports (E/I)
- Fast N' Loud
- Food Factory USA
- Full Throttle Saloon
- Hardcore Pawn
- Hardcore Pawn: Chicago
- Lizard Lick Towing
- The Liquidator
- Most Daring
- South Beach Tow
- Speeders
- Storage Hunters
- Storage Wars: Northern Treasures
- Survivorman
- Swords: Life on the Line

=== Former programming ===
- Auction Kings
- Aussie Gold Hunters
- Black Gold
- Chasing Monsters
- Classic Cartoons
- Doomsday Preppers
- Dual Survival
- Factory Made
- Fish Tank Kings
- Giant Lobster Hunters
- Hunting Hitler
- Machines: How They Work
- Made by Destruction
- Mayday: Air Disaster
- Mega Builders
- Mega Shippers
- Modern Marvels
- MonsterQuest
- My Floating Home
- Seconds from Disaster
- Shipping Wars
- Storm Chasers
- The Ride That Got Away
- What Could Possibly Go Wrong?
- Yukon Gold

== Affiliates ==
As of December 2018, Quest has affiliation agreements with television stations in 67 media markets (including 24 of the top 30) encompassing 35 states, covering 60.81% of all households with at least one television set in the United States.

When its launch was announced, the network reached a charter affiliation agreement with network co-partner Tegna, which initially planned to debut the network on 22 of its television stations. On December 20, 2017, the network signed a multi-station agreement with Spanish-language broadcaster TelevisaUnivision USA to carry its programming on five of its Univision and UniMás owned-and-operated television stations as well as one station affiliated with Justice Network.

List of Quest affiliates
Media market	State/District	Station	Channel
Huntsville	Alabama	WZDX-DT5	54.5
Mobile	Alabama	WPMI-DT2	15.2
Montgomery	Alabama	WDSF-LD	19.1
Phoenix	Arizona	KPNX-DT4	12.4
Tucson	Arizona	KMSB-DT4	11.4
Little Rock	Arkansas	KTHV-DT4	11.4
Bakersfield	California	KUVI-DT	45.1
Los Angeles	California	KFTR-DT5	46.5
Sacramento	California	KXTV-DT3	10.3
San Diego	California	KFMB-DT5	8.5
San Francisco	California	KTLN-DT5	68.5
Denver	Colorado	KUSA-DT5	9.5
Hartford–New Haven	Connecticut	WCCT-DT4	20.4
Washington	District of Columbia	WUSA-DT3	9.3
Jacksonville	Florida	WTLV-DT4/WJXX-DT3	12.4/25.3
Miami–Fort Lauderdale	Florida	WAMI-DT5	69.5
Orlando	Florida	WVEN-DT5	43.5
Tampa	Florida	WTSP-DT4	10.4
West Palm Beach	Florida	WFLX-DT6	29.6
Atlanta	Georgia	WXIA-DT4	11.4
Boise	Idaho	KTVB-DT4	7.4
Chicago	Illinois	WXFT-DT3	60.3
Moline	Illinois	WQAD-DT5	8.5
Rockford	Illinois	WREX-DT6	13.6
Fort Wayne	Indiana	WFWC-CD8	45.8
Indianapolis	Indiana	WTHR-DT2	13.2
South Bend	Indiana	WSJV-DT8	28.8
Cedar Rapids	Iowa	KGAN-DT3	2.3
Des Moines	Iowa	KCWI-DT4	23.4
Louisville	Kentucky	WHAS-DT3	11.3
Lexington	Kentucky	WTVQ-DT6	36.6
Lafayette	Louisiana	KXKW-LD5	32.5
Monroe	Louisiana	KMCT-DT6	39.6
New Orleans	Louisiana	WUPL-DT2	54.2
Shreveport	Louisiana	KSHV-DT4	45.4
Bangor	Maine	WLBZ-DT3	2.3
Portland	Maine	WCSH-DT4	6.4
Detroit	Michigan	WADL-DT3	38.3
Flint–Saginaw–Bay City	Michigan	WEYI-DT4	25.4
Grand Rapids	Michigan	WZZM-DT4	13.4
Duluth	Minnesota	KDLH-DT6	3.6
Minneapolis–Saint Paul	Minnesota	KARE-DT2	11.2
Rochester	Minnesota	KXLT-DT5	47.5
Kansas City	Missouri	KCTV-DT4	5.4
St. Louis	Missouri	KYTV-DT6	3.6
Springfield	Missouri	KSDK-DT4	5.4
Las Vegas	Nevada	KINC-DT5	15.5
Reno	Nevada	KOLO-DT5	8.5
Albuquerque	New Mexico	KLUZ-DT2	14.2
Buffalo	New York	WGRZ-DT4	2.4
New York City	New York	WMBC-DT2	63.2
Charlotte	North Carolina	WCNC-DT4	36.4
Fayetteville	North Carolina	WUVC-DT6	40.6
Greensboro–Winston-Salem	North Carolina	WFMY-DT4	2.4
Willmington	North Carolina	WWAY-DT4	3.4
Bismarck	North Dakota	KFYR-DT5	5.5
Dickinson	North Dakota	KQCD-DT5	7.5
Fargo	North Dakota	KRDK-DT9	4.9
Minot	North Dakota	KMOT-DT5	10.5
Cincinnati	Ohio	WBQC-LD12	25.12
Cleveland	Ohio	WKYC-DT4	3.4
Columbus	Ohio	WBNS-DT5	10.5
Toledo	Ohio	WTOL-DT4	11.4
Oklahoma City	Oklahoma	KOCO-DT7	5.7
Tulsa	Oklahoma	KGEB-DT5	53.5
Klamath Falls	Oregon	KOTI-DT3	2.3
Medford	Oregon	KOBI-DT3	5.3
Portland	Oregon	KGW-DT4	8.4
Philadelphia	Pennsylvania	WFPA-CD3	28.3
Pittsburgh	Pennsylvania	WPCB-DT4	40.4
Columbia	South Carolina	WLTX-DT4	19.4
Greenville	South Carolina	WDKT-LD2	31.2
Myrtle Beach	South Carolina	WMBF-DT6	32.6
Chattanooga	Tennessee	WDEF-DT5	12.5
Knoxville	Tennessee	WBIR-DT4	10.4
Memphis	Tennessee	WATN-DT4	24.4
Nashville	Tennessee	WUXP-DT2	30.2
Amarillo	Texas	KAUO-LD7	15.7
Austin	Texas	KVUE-DT4	24.4
Bryan–College Station	Texas	KAGS-LD3	23.3
Dallas–Fort Worth	Texas	KFAA (Part-time)	29.1
Dallas–Fort Worth	Texas	WFAA-DT4	8.4
El Paso	Texas	KTFN-DT3	65.3
Houston	Texas	KTBU	55.1
Lubbock	Texas	KLCW-DT4	22.4
Odessa–Midland	Texas	KWES-DT4	9.4
San Angelo	Texas	KIDY-DT6	6.6
San Antonio	Texas	KENS-DT4	5.4
Temple–Waco	Texas	KCEN-DT3	6.3
Burlington	Vermont	WVNY-DT4	22.4
Hampton–Norfolk	Virginia	WVEC-DT4	13.4
Seattle–Tacoma	Washington	KING-DT3	5.3
Spokane	Washington	KSKN-DT3	22.3
Green Bay	Wisconsin	WCWF-DT5	14.5
Milwaukee	Wisconsin	WIWN-DT3	68.3
Wausau	Wisconsin	WSAW-DT5	7.5
