= KUMV-TV =

Television station in Williston, North Dakota

Semi-satellite of KMOT, Minot, North Dakota

- Williston, North Dakota; United States
- Channels: Digital: 8 (VHF); Virtual: 8
- Branding: KUMV-TV; NBC North Dakota; West Dakota Fox (8.2); MeTV North Dakota (8.3)

Programming
- Network: NBC North Dakota
- Affiliations: 8.1: NBC; 8.2: Fox; 8.3: MeTV

Ownership
- Owner: Gray Media; (Gray Television Licensee, LLC)
- Sister stations: KFYR-TV, KMOT, KQCD-TV

History
- First air date: February 6, 1957
- Former channel numbers: Analog: 8 (VHF, 1957–2009); Digital: 52 (UHF, until 2009)
- Former affiliations: Both secondary: CBS (1957–1969); ABC (1957–1986)
- Call sign meaning: Upper Missouri Valley

Technical information
- Licensing authority: FCC
- Facility ID: 41429
- ERP: 6 kW
- HAAT: 320 m (1,050 ft)
- Transmitter coordinates: 48°8′2″N 103°51′38″W
- Translator(s): see § Translators

Links
- Public license information: Public file; LMS
- Website: www.kfyrtv.com

KUMV-TV (channel 8) is a television station in Williston, North Dakota, United States, affiliated with NBC and Fox. Owned by Gray Media, the station maintains a news studio and advertising sales office at the intersection of Main Street (US 2 BUS) and 6th Street East in Williston, and its transmitter is located west of the city near the North Dakota–Montana border.

KUMV is part of the four-station NBC North Dakota regional network of NBC affiliates in central and western North Dakota, originating from flagship station KFYR-TV (channel 5) in Bismarck. The NBC North Dakota network relays NBC network and other programming from KFYR across central and western North Dakota, as well as bordering counties in Montana and South Dakota. The four stations along with fellow NBC affiliate KVLY-TV in Fargo often share news stories. Master control and some internal operations of KUMV are based at KFYR's facilities on North 4th Street and East Broadway Avenue in downtown Bismarck. The four stations are counted as a single unit for ratings purposes.

KUMV operates as a semi-satellite of KMOT (channel 10) in Minot. KMOT is itself a semi-satellite of KFYR-TV in Bismarck, which also has semi-satellite KQCD-TV (channel 7) in Dickinson. KUMV identifies itself as a separate station in its own right, but clears all network and syndicated programming as provided through KMOT. However, KUMV airs local news inserts into KMOT's weeknight newscasts, as well as separate commercial inserts and legal identifications. The Montana viewing portion of KUMV's coverage area is within the Mountain Time Zone, and the station's prime time schedule starts at 6 p.m. rather than the usual 7 p.m. for the time zone.

The over-the-air signal of KUMV reaches portions of the Canadian province of Saskatchewan, but is no longer available on any cable systems there. KUMV is also carried in the Glendive, Montana market through cable television; until 2013, it operated a translator, K13PL in that city. CBS affiliate KXGN-TV in Glendive also had a digital subchannel carrying NBC programming, but it was not associated with KUMV and aired separate programming that included newscasts from Billings NBC affiliate KULR-TV. That affiliation ended in 2024.

== History ==
KUMV-TV signed on February 6, 1957, after Meyer obtained the construction permit on July 18, 1956. It was a semi-satellite of KFYR-TV for a year. KMOT signed on January 23, 1958, as the third station in the Meyer group, and KUMV became a semi-satellite of KMOT.

Until KBMY/KMCY signed on in 1986, the Meyer stations carried a secondary affiliation with ABC. Until KXMD-TV signed on in 1969, KUMV carried CBS on a per-program basis.

In the late 1970s, KUMV became one of the first stations to be transmitted via terrestrial cable television into most of Saskatchewan; it even maintained a sales office in Saskatoon, as did KXMD and KFBB-TV, the ABC affiliate in Great Falls, Montana. This arrangement continued until early 1985, when the three North Dakota network affiliates were replaced by CANCOM feeds of the Detroit stations by Saskatchewan cable providers who felt the switch would improve signal quality.

The Meyers sold off their broadcast holdings in 1997, with the television stations going to Sunrise Television Corporation. Sunrise sold them to The Wicks Group of Companies of New York City in 2002.

Hoak Media bought KFYR-TV, KMOT, KUMV, and KQCD in July 2006, as well as KVLY-TV in Fargo and KSFY-TV in Sioux Falls, South Dakota and its satellite stations. On November 17, 2006, the sale was approved by the Federal Communications Commission (FCC).

KUMV began broadcasting digital-only on February 16, 2009.

KUMV picked up MeTV in April 2013, with an official launch date of May 1, 2013.

On November 20, 2013, Hoak announced the sale of most of its stations, including KUMV-TV, to Gray Television. Gray initially planned, through Excalibur Broadcasting, to also acquire Fox affiliate KXND and its Williston translator from Prime Cities Broadcasting and operate it under a shared services agreement, which would have made it a sister station to KUMV. On March 25, 2014, Prime Cities Broadcasting requested that the FCC dismiss the sale of KXND to Excalibur; Gray would instead acquire the non-license assets of KXND, as well as the license of Williston repeater KXND-LP. The sale of the Hoak stations was completed on June 13; at that time, Gray shut down KXND's full-power signal and moved Fox programming to the second digital subchannel of KUMV.

== Newscasts ==
KUMV airs its own newscasts from Monday through Friday at 6 and 10 p.m. The first 10 minutes (which includes regional news and weather) originate at KMOT. KUMV has its own news and sports anchor who fill the remaining 20 minutes. Weekend newscasts are simulcast from KFYR.

From 2002 to 2007, KMOT was forced to cut its newscasts to 20 minutes while simulcasting the first 10 minutes of KFYR-TV's 6 and 10 p.m. newscasts, much as KUMV does now. In January 2007, KMOT began airing full 30-minute newscasts at 6 and 10 p.m. once again. It also added a weatherman and photographer/reporter to the staff.

The stations occasionally share stories with co-owned KVLY-TV. The five stations simulcast major North Dakota sporting events and statewide political debates under the NBC North Dakota brand name and share certain equipment, such as remote broadcasting vehicles. On April 30, 2012, NBC North Dakota began broadcasting its local newscasts in high definition.

NBC North Dakota has long dominated the ratings in western North Dakota as a whole; the main stations and their semi-satellites count as one station for ratings and regulatory purposes. However, KMOT has spent most of its history as a distant runner-up to KXMC-TV in the northern half of the market.

The Fox-affiliated subchannel debuted West Dakota Fox News at Nine during October 2014, originating from KFYR's studios in Bismarck.

== Technical information ==
=== Subchannels ===
The station's signal is multiplexed:

Subchannels of KUMV-TV
Subchannel	Res.	Short name	Programming
8.1	1080i	KUMV-DT	NBC
8.2	720p	WD FOX	Fox
8.3	480i	MeTV ND	MeTV

=== Analog-to-digital conversion ===
KUMV-TV shut down its analog signal, over VHF channel 8, on February 16, 2009, the day prior to the original date on which full-power television stations in the United States were set to transition from analog to digital broadcasts under federal mandate (which was later rescheduled for June 12, 2009). The station's digital signal relocated from its pre-transition UHF channel 52, which was among the high band UHF channels (52-69) that were removed from broadcasting use as a result of the transition, to its analog-era VHF channel 8 for post-transition operations.

=== Translators ===
- K26NS-D Fort Peck, MT
- K11IA-D Glasgow, MT
- K07DI-D Hinsdale, MT
- K15KR-D Poplar, MT
- K03DP-D Scobey, MT
- K29FS-D Wolf Point, MT

== See also ==
- KFYR-TV
- KMOT
- KQCD-TV
- KVLY-TV
