= KMOT =

Television station in Minot, North Dakota

Semi-satellite of KFYR-TV, Bismarck, North Dakota

- Minot, North Dakota; United States
- Channels: Digital: 10 (VHF); Virtual: 10
- Branding: KMOT-TV; NBC North Dakota; West Dakota Fox (10.2); MeTV North Dakota (10.3)

Programming
- Network: NBC North Dakota
- Affiliations: 10.1: NBC; 10.2: Fox; 10.3: MeTV

Ownership
- Owner: Gray Media; (Gray Television Licensee, LLC)
- Sister stations: KFYR-TV, KQCD-TV, KUMV-TV

History
- First air date: January 23, 1958
- Former channel numbers: Analog: 10 (VHF, 1958–2009); Digital: 58 (UHF, until 2009)
- Former affiliations: ABC (secondary, 1958–1986)
- Call sign meaning: Minot

Technical information
- Licensing authority: FCC
- Facility ID: 41425
- ERP: 7.69 kW
- HAAT: 207 m (679 ft)
- Transmitter coordinates: 48°12′56″N 101°19′7″W

Links
- Public license information: Public file; LMS
- Website: www.kfyrtv.com

KMOT (channel 10) is a television station in Minot, North Dakota, United States, affiliated with NBC and Fox. The station is owned by Gray Media, and maintains studios and transmitter facilities at the intersection of 16th Street and 18th Avenue SW in Minot.

KMOT is one of two full-fledged NBC stations in the NBC North Dakota regional network of NBC affiliates in central and western North Dakota, along with flagship station KFYR-TV (channel 5) in Bismarck. The NBC North Dakota network relays NBC network and other programming across central and western North Dakota, as well as bordering counties in Montana and South Dakota. The four stations along with fellow NBC affiliate KVLY-TV in Fargo often share news stories. Master control and some internal operations of KMOT are based at KFYR's facilities on North 4th Street and East Broadway Avenue in downtown Bismarck. The four stations are counted as a single unit for ratings purposes.

KMOT also operates a semi-satellite in Williston, North Dakota, KUMV-TV (channel 8), which airs local advertising and weekday newscast inserts focusing on the northwestern portion of the Minot–Bismarck market, but otherwise airs the same programming as KMOT. Although operated as a separate station in its own right, KMOT is actually considered a semi-satellite of KFYR-TV in Bismarck, which also has semi-satellite KQCD-TV (channel 7) in Dickinson. It clears all network and syndicated programming as provided through its parent but airs separate local newscasts, legal identifications, and commercial inserts. KFYR and KQCD serve the southern portion of the Bismarck–Minot/Dickinson–Williston market while KMOT and KUMV serve the northern portion.

The over-the-air signal of KMOT reaches portions of the Canadian province of Saskatchewan, but is no longer available on any cable systems there.

Dish Network and DirecTV only provide only KFYR as central and western North Dakota's NBC affiliate.

== History ==
KMOT began test programs on January 7, 1958, and officially went on the air on January 23, 1958, as the third station in the Meyer group, after KFYR-TV and KUMV-TV. KUMV, which signed on a year earlier as a semi-satellite of KFYR, became a semi-satellite of KMOT. Until KBMY/KMCY signed on in 1986, the Meyer stations carried a secondary affiliation with ABC. Until KXMD-TV signed on in 1969, KUMV would break away from KMOT to carry select CBS programs.

The Meyers sold off their broadcast holdings in 1997, with the television stations going to Sunrise Television Corporation. Sunrise sold them to The Wicks Group of Companies of New York City in 2002.

Hoak Media bought KFYR-TV, KMOT, KUMV, and KQCD in July 2006, as well as KVLY-TV in Fargo and KSFY in Sioux Falls, South Dakota and its satellite stations. On November 17, 2006, the sale was approved by the FCC.

On January 19, 2009, KMOT began operation as a digital-only station on its existing channel frequency.

KMOT picked up MeTV in April 2013, with an official launch date of May 1, 2013.

On November 20, 2013, Hoak announced the sale of most of its stations, including KMOT, to Gray Television. Gray initially planned, through Excalibur Broadcasting, to also acquire Fox affiliate KXND from Prime Cities Broadcasting and operate it under a shared services agreement, which would have made it a sister station to KMOT. On March 25, 2014, Prime Cities Broadcasting requested that the FCC dismiss the sale of KXND to Excalibur; Gray would instead acquire the non-license assets of KXND, as well as the license of Williston repeater KXND-LP. The sale of the Hoak stations was completed on June 13; at that time, Gray shut down KXND's full-power signal and moved Fox programming to the second digital subchannel of KMOT.

== Newscasts ==
KMOT produces its own newscasts from Monday through Friday weekdays at 6 and 10 p.m., and rebroadcasts KFYR-TV's other newscasts.

KUMV airs its own newscasts from Monday through Friday at 6 and 10 p.m. The first 10 minutes (which includes regional news and weather) originate at KMOT. KUMV has its own news and sports anchor who fill the remaining 20 minutes. It simulcasts KMOT/KFYR's other newscasts.

From 2002 to 2007, KMOT was forced to cut its newscasts to 20 minutes while simulcasting the first 10 minutes of KFYR-TV's 6 and 10 p.m. newscasts, much as KUMV does now. In January 2007, KMOT began airing full 30-minute newscasts at 6 and 10 p.m. once again. It also added a weatherman and photographer/reporter to the staff.

The stations occasionally share stories with co-owned KVLY-TV. The five stations simulcast major North Dakota sporting events and statewide political debates under the NBC North Dakota brand name and share certain equipment, such as remote broadcasting vehicles. On April 30, 2012, NBC North Dakota began broadcasting its local newscasts in high definition.

NBC North Dakota has long dominated the ratings in western North Dakota as a whole; the main stations and their semi-satellites count as one station for ratings and regulatory purposes. However, KMOT has spent most of its history as a distant runner-up to KXMC-TV in the northern half of the market.

The Fox-affiliated subchannel debuted West Dakota Fox News at Nine during October 2014, originating from KFYR's studios in Bismarck.

== Technical information ==
=== Subchannels ===
The station's signal is multiplexed:

Subchannels of KMOT
Channel	Res.	Short name	Programming
10.1	1080i	KMOT-DT	NBC
10.2	720p	WD FOX	Fox
10.3	480i	MeTV ND	MeTV

=== Analog-to-digital conversion ===
KMOT shut down its analog signal, over VHF channel 10, on January 19, 2009. The station's digital signal relocated from its pre-transition UHF channel 58, which was among the high band UHF channels (52-69) that were removed from broadcasting use as a result of the transition, to its analog-era VHF channel 10 for post-transition operations.

== See also ==
- KFYR-TV
- KQCD-TV
- KUMV-TV
- KVLY-TV
