= KCND-TV =

Television station in Pembina, North Dakota (1960–1975)

- Pembina, North Dakota; Winnipeg, Manitoba; United States–Canada
- City: Pembina, North Dakota
- Channels: Analog: 12 (VHF)

Programming
- Affiliations: ABC (secondary, 1960–1975); NBC (secondary, 1960–1967)

Ownership
- Owner: Community Radio Corp. (1960–1962); Pembina Broadcasting Co., a division of Polaris Corp. (1962–1966); McLendon Corporation (1966–1975)

History
- Founded: November 7, 1960
- Last air date: September 1, 1975
- Call sign meaning: Canada and North Dakota

Technical information
- ERP: Video: 288 kW; Audio: 43.6 kW
- HAAT: 426.7 m (1,400 ft)
- Transmitter coordinates: 48°59′44″N 97°24′28″W

KCND-TV (channel 12) was a television station in Pembina, North Dakota, United States, which broadcast from 1960 to 1975. The station targeted the Winnipeg, Manitoba, Canada, market some 60 miles (97 km) to the north. It was the forerunner of current Global Television Network station CKND-DT (channel 9) in Winnipeg, which remains in operation.

KCND was established by the Community Radio Corporation, the parent company of KNOX-TV and KNOX AM in Grand Forks, North Dakota, after being granted a construction permit by the U.S. Federal Communications Commission in July 1958. The station's plans were publicly announced on March 13, 1959, and KCND signed on November 7, 1960 on channel 12. The station's studios and master control system were located in Pembina, with Canadian sales and production facilities being located at 2031 Portage Avenue in St. James, a suburb of Winnipeg.

== History ==
Startup preparations for the station began in March 1959, at an estimated cost of $150,000 according to Community Radio Corporation partner Robert Lukkason. The station was initially expected to be a semi-satellite of KNOX-TV in Grand Forks (now defunct), but would have its own studios.

KCND's original construction permit was based on plans to operate from a 310-foot (94 m) tower with a power of 21,000 watts. However, this plan changed and one of the tallest broadcast towers in North America was constructed—1,450 feet (440 m)—100 feet (30 m) short of the height of the Empire State Building in New York City. The tower was located 7 miles (11 km) west of Pembina and less than a half-mile south of the Canada/U.S. border. The station initially operated at a power of 220,000 watts, later increasing power to 288,000 watts.

According to the 1960 U.S. Census, the population of Pembina the year KCND went on the air was a mere 625 people, making Pembina one of the smallest non-suburban municipalities in the U.S. to have its own TV station.

KCND operated as a semi-independent station. It was affiliated with both NBC and ABC for periods, but was not compensated by the networks due to the station's insignificant U.S. audience and thus never showed all of either network's schedule. It carried NBC's The Tonight Show Starring Johnny Carson until September 2, 1966, replacing it with the broadcast syndication version of "The Merv Griffin Show" the following Monday.

In 1962, KCND was acquired along with KNOX-TV in Grand Forks and KXGO-TV in Fargo for $675,200 by the Pembina Broadcasting Company, a group led by Ferris Traylor, the part-owner of an Indiana TV station. In 1963, citing the three stations' weak financial condition, the FCC approved a plan that resulted in Pembina Broadcasting moving KXGO to a taller tower to serve both Fargo and Grand Forks under the new call letters KTHI-TV, closing down KNOX-TV, and effectively making KCND into a KTHI semi-satellite.

In November 1963, KCND added an additional microwave relay path to Minneapolis via Fargo, to improve signal quality when the primary link was experiencing "network trouble". In addition to problems with the microwave relay system that forwarded network programming to the Pembina studio, KCND also suffered from spotty reception in Winnipeg, causing the station to struggle financially in its early years. At one point, prior to the establishment of a citywide cable TV system in Winnipeg in 1968, KCND resorted to giving away free rooftop aerials to Winnipeg residents.

In 1966, the McLendon Corporation of Dallas, Tex. purchased KCND from the Pembina Broadcasting Company. McLendon would remain the station's owner until its assets were sold to Canwest Broadcasting in 1975.

Around the time that WDAZ-TV went on air in February 1967, KCND lost its NBC affiliation. Thereafter, it carried about half of the ABC prime time lineup (which was in those days a distant third among the U.S. networks in the ratings) and showed low-budget syndicated programming (e.g., series like Felony Squad that had run for one or two seasons years earlier) and movies the rest of the time. The station produced a modest amount of local programming out of its U.S. and Canadian studios, including a breakfast program called Good Morning, a midday current affairs show called Around the Country, and a weekly hunting and fishing series called Fin and Feather.

== Relocation and rebranding as CKND Winnipeg ==
By 1972, Winnipeg residents watched KCND for about one fifth of their television. In July 1972, the Canadian Radio-television and Telecommunications Commission (CRTC) announced it would consider applications for a third English-language TV station in Winnipeg. Western Manitoba Broadcasters Ltd., the parent company of CKX-TV in Brandon, Manitoba, was the first to announce that it had applied for a licence in early 1973. In mid-February, Communications Winnipeg Co-Op, a group of "lawyers, university professors and students, [and] freelance broadcasters", announced their own application to create a not-for-profit, member-supported station.

At about the same time, the Government of Manitoba was preparing an economic analysis which concluded that, with about 90 percent of KCND's estimated 1972 revenues of $1.25 million coming from Canadian advertising accounts, "it is difficult to ascertain how rapidly a new station can become viable" and that "it is likely that a new private television station in Winnipeg would not realize a profit for at least three years."

The CRTC held public hearings in Winnipeg in May 1974 to determine which of the three competing applicants should be granted a licence. By this time, Western Manitoba Broadcasters and Communications Winnipeg Co-Op had been joined in the competition for the licence by Canwest Broadcasting, which had made an agreement with the McLendon Corporation to purchase KCND's assets and relocate the station to Winnipeg if granted the licence.

The Canadian government was displeased with the existence of border stations which, while nominally American, existed primarily to broadcast U.S. content into major Canadian markets in competition with local broadcasters (and without the Canadian content that Canadian TV stations were and are required by law to provide). Accordingly, the government amended the Income Tax Act to curtail the tax deductibility of advertising expenditures incurred by Canadian businesses in the U.S. media, while the CRTC prepared to implement a simultaneous substitution policy which would require cable TV systems to carry the Canadian signal on both channels whenever the same program was being shown on both a Canadian and American station at the same time. In the case of KCND, this measure threatened to eliminate the significant portion of its advertising revenue that originated in Winnipeg and bring about the demise of the station.

KCND-TV full-page "farewell" in the Winnipeg Free Press, August 29, 1975

Canwest also argued in its presentation to the CRTC that relocating KCND to Winnipeg would be preferable to starting a new station, as this would provide their station with a $2 million advertising base and would save $1.5 million in capital and start-up costs.

Canwest was awarded the licence in September 1974 and took over possession and day-to-day management of KCND on March 31, 1975. Under the sale agreement, McLendon agreed to sell Canwest the station's equipment and assets, and to act as a consultant until the relocation had been completed, for US$774,000. As KCND's U.S. broadcasting licence remained under McLendon's control until after the station left the air, no FCC approval was required. In the meantime, at the suggestion of KCND general manager and Canwest vice-president Jerry Johnson, Canwest had obtained approval to use the Canadian call letters CKND to emphasize continuity and prevent audience loss.

Consolidation of KCND's Pembina, North Dakota and Winnipeg, Manitoba operations at a new, larger facility at 603 St. Mary's Road in Winnipeg began in the spring of 1975. Arrangements had been made by the end of May 1975 for KCND's seventeen Winnipeg-based employees to continue their employment with CKND. Few, if any, of the 22 U.S.-based employees were retained, though all had been offered employment in Canada.

A CKND mobile production van functioned as KCND's master control system during August 1975, allowing the main master control system to be dismantled in Pembina and then re-assembled in Winnipeg without putting the station off the air. CKND's decision to broadcast from an antenna mounted on the CBC-owned CBWT tower near Starbuck, Manitoba, instead of moving the KCND tower to a site near Sanford, Manitoba, as originally planned, also allowed for continuity during the transition.

KCND-TV's signal on Winnipeg's cable systems went off for the final time on August 31, 1975, at 8:30 p.m., following the 7 p.m. movie, The Thrill of It All. The transmitter remained on the air, simulcasting CKND, until 5:30 p.m. the following afternoon. CKND-TV signed on for the first time at 9 p.m. on over-the-air channel 9 and cable channel 12 with the program Introducing CKND, followed by the Jerry Lewis MDA Telethon, which began at 9:30 p.m. and was shown until Monday September 1 at 5:30 p.m.

This was the beginning of Israel Asper's career as a media mogul of the Canwest empire, which culminated in his owning most of the large daily newspapers in Canada and TV stations in nearly every province.

== Subsequent Pembina station ==
In May 1974, John Boler, the founder and then-owner of Valley City–Fargo CBS affiliate KXJB-TV informed both the FCC and the Winnipeg newspapers that he intended to apply for a new channel 12 license if KCND-TV went off the air, or make his own offer to purchase the station if the McLendon-Canwest agreement fell through. Boler's North American Communications Corp. initially applied for a license in April 1978, intending to operate the new station as a KXJB satellite. As this complicated Boler's negotiations to sell his majority shareholding in KXJB to the Central Minnesota Television Co., the application was withdrawn that June.

A second application, filed in November 1979, resulted in Boler and fellow investors Jack Wood and Robert Alphson being awarded a license in 1981 to start a new channel 12 station at Pembina. In issuing the license, the FCC dismissed objections filed by Canwest and by KTHI-TV owner Spokane Television, Inc., both opposing the establishment of a new Pembina station on competitive grounds. After receiving the license, Wood unsuccessfully approached Canwest with an offer to purchase the KCND tower, then still standing near Pembina but awaiting the move to a site near Minnedosa, Manitoba that would extend CKND coverage into western Manitoba beginning in September 1982.

The new station, using the call letters KWBA, was originally expected to begin broadcasting in the summer of 1982, operating as a conventional television station during the day and as a pay-TV station offering commercial-free full-length movies after 7 p.m. The introduction of pay-TV in Canada at about the same time, and poor consumer uptake for early Canadian pay-TV outlets such as the short-lived C Channel, convinced the investors that a pay-TV station broadcasting into Canada from Pembina, North Dakota, would not be viable. Consequently, the construction permit was transferred to the Boler-owned Fargo Broadcasting Corporation, operators of Fargo, North Dakota independent station KVRR, in mid-1985, and the proposed call letters were changed from KWBA to KNRR that September.

KNRR signed on January 1, 1986, using a tower built at the same location and to approximately the same height as the by-then dismantled KCND-TV tower. It was and remains a satellite of KVRR in Fargo, which was an independent station when KNRR began broadcasting, but became a charter affiliate of the Fox television network later in 1986.

Canadian broadcast regulators, concerned that KNRR planned to compete directly with Canadian TV stations for audience share and local advertising dollars as KCND had done, refused to authorize either KNRR or its sister stations for distribution on Canadian cable systems, limiting KNRR's reach to a very small Canadian audience.

== Surviving recordings ==
Since October 2011, several brief audio recordings, including a station identification, promotional announcements and at least one commercial, have been available on YouTube.

As home videotape recorders were not yet commonplace when KCND-TV left the air in 1975 and as stations often reuse or discard their own videotape stock, no video recordings of the station's programming are known to survive.

== Logos ==
KCND logo early 1970s

== KCND-TV personalities ==
- Dick Vincent – on-air host during the whole history of the station. He would later move to CKND along with the station. Previously worked as an announcer on CJOB.
- Sharon McRae – on-air hostess and weather announcer during the Johnny Carson Show, hostess with Dick Vincent, on Around The Country show. Previously worked at CKRC Radio in Winnipeg, Manitoba, early 1960s.
- Boyd Jerome (Boyd Christenson) – Pembina-based announcer, program host and manager, 1960–64. Known by his first and middle names while at KCND, as it was thought that "Christenson" might be too difficult for Canadian viewers to pronounce. Later known by his full name during his years at WDAY-TV Fargo, Prairie Public Television and KFGO Fargo.
- Terry Stouffer – Around the Country co-host and Farm Service Director, late 1960s.
- Joe Cooke – Around the Country co-host, late 1960s.
