= KNOX-TV =

Television station in Grand Forks, North Dakota (1955–1964)

- Grand Forks, North Dakota; United States
- Channels: Analog: 10 (VHF)

Programming
- Affiliations: ABC (primary); NBC (secondary)

Ownership
- Owner: Community Radio Corporation
- Sister stations: KCND-TV, KNOX

History
- First air date: December 11, 1955
- Last air date: January 31, 1964
- Call sign meaning: From radio station KNOX (AM)

KNOX-TV (channel 10) was a television station in Grand Forks, North Dakota, United States, owned by Community Radio Corporation. The station operated from December 11, 1955, to January 31, 1964.

== History ==
KNOX broadcast on channel 10 as an ABC affiliate. The station later signed on Winnipeg-targeted border blaster KCND-TV, which was a semi-satellite of KNOX, on November 7, 1960. While KNOX was a primary ABC affiliate, the station also carried programming from NBC.

In 1962, KNOX and KCND, along with KEND-TV (now KVLY-TV) in Fargo, North Dakota, were purchased for $675,200 by the Pembina Broadcasting Company, a group led by Ferris Traylor, the part-owner of an Indiana TV station. KNOX merged with KEND, and KNOX broadcast its last program and shut down on January 31, 1964, after KEND (renamed KTHI-TV) began transmitting from a tower in Blanchard, between Fargo and Grand Forks. After KNOX-TV's shutdown, the Grand Forks area did not have a local television station until NBC affiliate WDAZ-TV signed on in 1967.

Channel 10 is now used by Fox affiliate KBRR serving Grand Forks (a satellite of KVRR), which signed on in 1985 licensed to Thief River Falls, Minnesota.
