= Smith Media =

American media company

- Founded: 1985; 41 years ago (as Smith Television)
- Founder: Bob Smith
- Defunct: March 20, 2014; 12 years ago
- Fate: Dissolved; television stations sold to various companies
- Successor: LIN Media; Heartland Media

Smith Media, LLC, successor to Smith Television aka Sunrise Television, was a broadcasting group co-based in Los Angeles, California and St. Petersburg, Florida, that formerly owned and operated several television stations across the United States. In 1986, Smith bought three smaller television stations from publishing company Times Mirror Company. In 2002, Sunrise sold six of the stations to LIN Television.

Smith Television became Smith Media, LLC in 2004 at the death of Bob Smith, head of the family run organization. The family decided to re-capitalize their stations and sold the stations to Boston Ventures, which created Smith Media. The similarities in names have created much confusion.

During the early 2010s, Smith Media sold off its stations; on October 1, 2013, Smith Media reached a deal to sell its last remaining station, WKTV in Utica, New York, to Heartland Media, a company owned by former Gray Television executive Bob Prather, pending FCC approval. The sale was completed on March 20, 2014.

== Former stations ==
Stations are arranged alphabetically by state and by city of license.

- With the exception of KATN, KEYT, KJUD, KYUR, WFFF, & WKTV, the second incarnation of Smith Media never owned these stations. Smith Media, LLC was successor to Smith Television, Inc. who owned the following:

| Media market | State | Station | Acquired | Sold | Notes |
|---|---|---|---|---|---|
| Anchorage | Alaska | KIMO | 1995 | 2010 | |
| Fairbanks | Alaska | KATN | 2001 | 2010 | (Note: Semi-satellite of KIMO.) |
| Juneau | Alaska | KJUD | 2001 | 2010 | |
| Santa Barbara | California | KEYT-TV | 1987 | 2012 | |
| Santa Barbara | California | KSBY | 1995 | 1996 | (Note: Acquired along with KSBW but divested almost immediately due to Smith's ownership of KEYT.) |
| Monterey–Santa Cruz | California | KSBW | 1995 | 1998 | |
| Dodge City | Kansas | KBSD-TV | 1989 | 1992 | (Note: Satellite of KWCH-TV.) |
| Goodland | Kansas | KBSL-TV | 1989 | 1992 | |
| Hays | Kansas | KBSH-TV | 1989 | 1992 | |
| Wichita | Kansas | KWCH-TV | 1989 | 1992 | |
| Flint | Michigan | WEYI-TV | 1997 | 2002 | |
| Reno | Nevada | KOLO-TV | 2000 | 2002 | |
| Binghamton | New York | WBGH-LP | 1997 | 2000 | (Note: Operated on channel 8 under Smith's ownership.) |
| Buffalo | New York | WGRZ-TV | 1986 | 1988 | |
| Elmira | New York | WETM-TV | 1986 | 2004 | (Note: From 2000-2004, The Ackerley Group, and later Clear Channel Communications would operate this station through a LMA.) |
| Rochester | New York | WROC-TV | 1996 | 1999 | |
| Utica | New York | WKTV | 1993 | 2014 | |
| Watertown | New York | WWTI-TV | 1990 | 2000 | |
| Watertown | New York | WNYF-LP | 1995 | 2002 | (Note: Operated by United Communications under a LMA from 2001 to 2002.) |
| Bismarck | North Dakota | KFYR-TV | 1997 | 2002 | |
| Dickinson | North Dakota | KQCD-TV | 1997 | 2002 | (Note: Satellite of KFYR-TV.) |
| Minot | North Dakota | KMOT | 1997 | 2002 | |
| Williston | North Dakota | KUMV-TV | 1997 | 2002 | |
| Fargo | North Dakota | KVLY-TV | 1997 | 2002 | |
| Dayton | Ohio | WDTN | 1998 | 2002 | |
| Steubenville | Ohio | WTOV-TV | 1996 | 2000 | |
| Toledo | Ohio | WUPW | 1999 | 2002 | |
| Harrisburg | Pennsylvania | WHTM-TV | 1986 | 1994 | |
| Johnstown | Pennsylvania | WJAC-TV | 1996 | 2000 | |
| Providence | Rhode Island | WPRI-TV | 2001 | 2002 | |
| Providence | Rhode Island | WNAC-TV | 1997 | 2001 | |
| Abilene | Texas | KRBC-TV | 1998 | 2002 | |
| San Angelo | Texas | KACB-TV | 1998 | 2002 | |
| Burlington | Vermont | WPTZ | 1998 | 1998 | |
| Burlington | Vermont | WFFF-TV | 1999 | 2013 | (Note: From 1998 to 1999, Smith operated WFFF through an LMA until purchasing it outright in 1999.) |
| Burlington | Vermont | WVNY | 2005 | 2013 | (Note: Owned by Lambert Broadcasting, operated by Smith through an LMA.) |
| Hartford | Vermont | WNNE | 1998 | 1998 | (Note: Semi-satellite of WPTZ.) |
