= KFYR-TV =

Television station in Bismarck, North Dakota

- Bismarck–Mandan, North Dakota; United States
- City: Bismarck, North Dakota
- Channels: Digital: 31 (UHF); Virtual: 5
- Branding: KFYR-TV; NBC North Dakota; West Dakota Fox (5.2); MeTV North Dakota (5.3)

Programming
- Network: NBC North Dakota
- Affiliations: 5.1: NBC; 5.2: Fox; for others, see § Subchannels

Ownership
- Owner: Gray Media; (Gray Television Licensee, LLC)
- Sister stations: KMOT, KQCD-TV, KUMV-TV, KVLY-TV, KXJB-LD

History
- First air date: December 19, 1953
- Former channel numbers: Analog: 5 (VHF, 1953–2009)
- Former affiliations: All secondary: CBS (1953−1955); DuMont (1953−1956); ABC (1953–1985)
- Call sign meaning: P(F)hilip Meyer, founder of KFYR radio

Technical information
- Licensing authority: FCC
- Facility ID: 41427
- ERP: 500 kW
- HAAT: 389 m (1,276 ft)
- Transmitter coordinates: 46°36′20.3″N 100°48′26.4″W

Links
- Public license information: Public file; LMS
- Website: www.kfyrtv.com

KFYR-TV (channel 5) is a television station in Bismarck, North Dakota, United States, affiliated with NBC and Fox. Owned by Gray Media, the station has studios on North 4th Street and East Broadway Avenue in downtown Bismarck, and its transmitter is located near St. Anthony, North Dakota.

KFYR-TV serves as the flagship station of NBC North Dakota, a regional network of four stations relaying NBC network and other programming provided by KFYR across central and western North Dakota, as well as bordering counties in Montana and South Dakota. The three satellite stations clear all network and syndicated programming as provided through KFYR but air separate legal identifications and commercial inserts. KQCD-TV (channel 7) in Dickinson simulcasts all of KFYR's programming, while KMOT (channel 10) in Minot also produces its own weekday local newscasts at 6 p.m. and 10 p.m., and KUMV-TV (channel 8) in Williston simulcasts KMOT's newscasts with local inserts. The four stations are counted as a single unit for ratings purposes.

KFYR also serves as the only available NBC affiliate for central and western North Dakota for subscribers of Dish Network and DirecTV.

KFYR-TV was established in 1953 by the Meyer family as the first television station in Bismarck and third in the state. The Williston and Minot stations were set up in 1957 and 1958, with Dickinson being added in 1980. As with KFYR radio, "Meyer Television" became the market leader. The Meyer family owned KFYR-TV until it opted to exit broadcasting in the late 1990s; the stations have been sold four times since.

== History ==
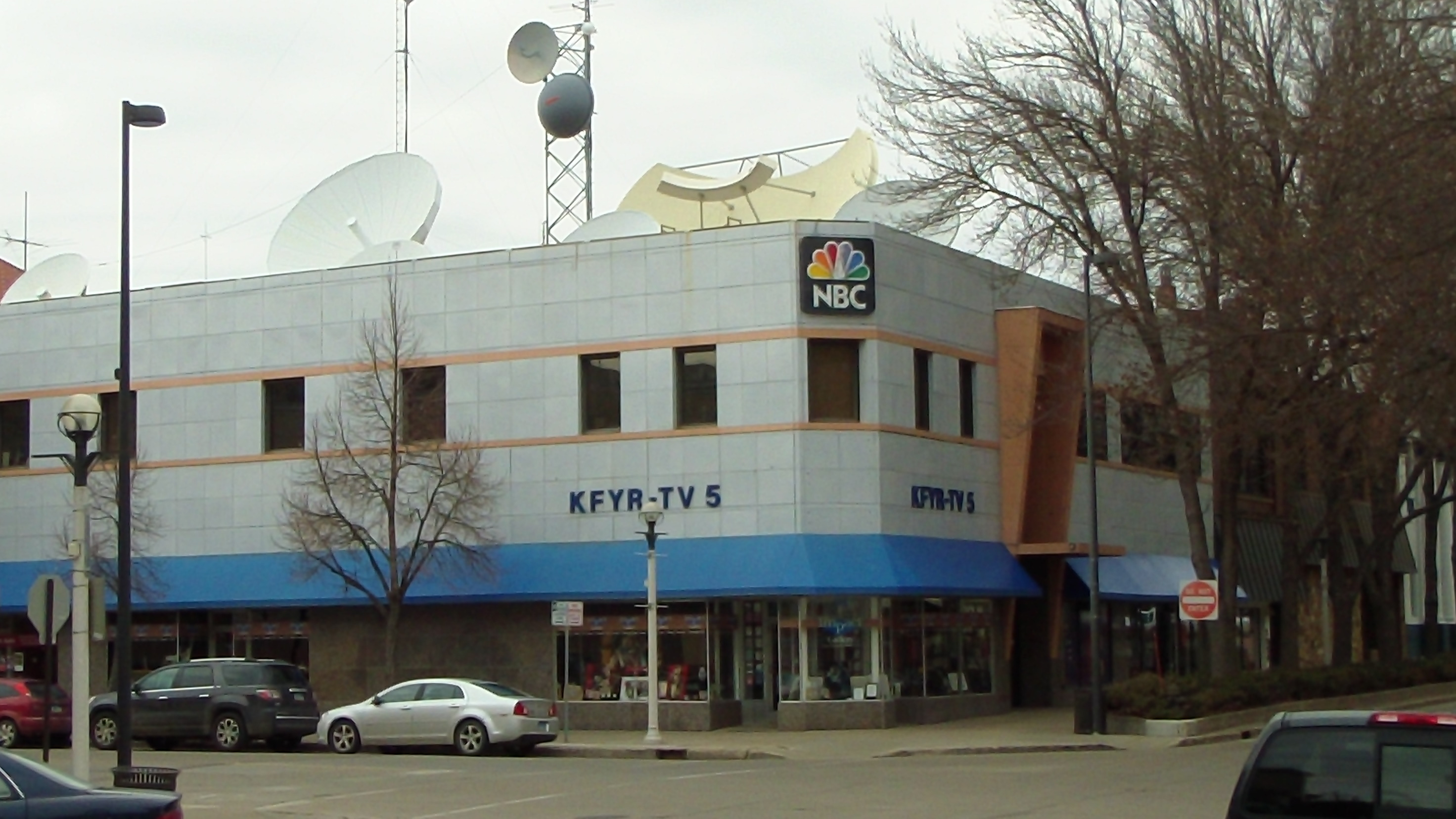
The KFYR-TV studio at 4th Street and Broadway Avenue in Bismarck

After the Federal Communications Commission (FCC) lifted its freeze on television station grants in 1952, Meyer Broadcasting Company filed for channel 5 in Bismarck on November 28, 1952. Also filing for channel 5 was M. B. Rudman, an oilman from Minot. In February 1953, Rudman changed his application to specify the other VHF channel in the city, channel 12, clearing the way for both groups to be granted construction permits on March 4. (Note: Rudman never followed through with a series of construction permits he had obtained for TV stations; finding that neither Bismarck nor Minot could not support more than one station and because of his expanding business activities, he opted to retain a permit for a station in Billings, Montana, and surrendered the others.)

From a temporary transmission facility atop the North Dakota State Capitol, KFYR-TV began broadcasting on December 19, 1953. It held affiliations with NBC and CBS; KFYR's relationship with NBC in radio dated to 1931. The State Capitol transmitter, said to be the only one of its kind in the country, was replaced in 1954 by the permanent facility, a more typical 503-foot (153 m) mast 11 miles (18 km) east of Bismarck. A second television station came to Bismarck in 1955, KBMB-TV (channel 12, later changed to KXMB-TV), which was a CBS affiliate and served as an extension of KXJB-TV in Valley City and KCJB-TV in Minot. Earlier that year, KFYR-TV began broadcasting live network programming to Bismarck. KFYR-TV would continue to air some ABC programming until a full-time ABC service, KBMY, began broadcasting in 1985.

Meyer Broadcasting expanded its reach with the construction of two new stations in 1957 and 1958. The first application to be granted was that for channel 10 in Minot (KMOT-TV), in October 1955, and Meyer was unopposed in its bid for channel 8 at Williston (KUMV-TV), which was approved in 1956. Dickinson would have to wait much longer for its full-power station, KQCD, to begin in 1980. Local news inserts from Dickinson ended on December 31, 1991, with the station turning to rebroadcasting KFYR's Bismarck news. In 1995, Meyer acquired KTHI-TV in Fargo, which it renamed KVLY-TV.

When Meyer opted to exit broadcasting in 1998, KFYR-TV and its associated stations were sold to Sunrise Television Corporation for $63.75 million; at that time, KFYR-TV accounted for 57 percent of all broadcast TV viewing in Bismarck. The sale separated KFYR radio and television, which at the time shared several on-air personalities and a news director. It was the first of several sales for KFYR-TV. In 2002, North Dakota Television LLC, a consortium of private equity firms The Wicks Group of Companies, JP Morgan Partners, and Halyard Capital acquired the KFYR system as well as KVLY-TV in Fargo. Hoak Media of Dallas acquired these stations, as well as KSFY-TV in Sioux Falls, South Dakota, and its satellites in 2006.

The NBC North Dakota network picked up MeTV in April 2013, with an official launch date of May 1, 2013.

On November 20, 2013, Gray Television announced it would purchase Hoak Media in a $335 million deal. Gray initially planned, through Excalibur Broadcasting, to also acquire Fox affiliate KNDX/KXND for $7.5 million and operate them under a local marketing agreement. On March 25, 2014, Prime Cities Broadcasting, owner of KNDX/KXND, requested that the FCC dismiss the sale of that station to Excalibur. Gray would instead acquire the stations' non-license assets; upon the closure of the Hoak purchases on June 13, 2014, KNDX/KXND were shuttered and their Fox programs moved to subchannels of KFYR and its satellites.

== News operation ==
KFYR's newscasts have led the ratings in western North Dakota for as long as records have been kept. Early on, the Meyers devoted significant resources to KFYR's news department, resulting in a higher-quality product than conventional wisdom would suggest for such a small market. This tradition has continued today. The station broadcasts local newscasts at 5 a.m., noon, 4 p.m., 5 p.m., 6 p.m. and 10 p.m. Central Time Monday through Friday; 6 and 10 p.m. on Saturday, and 5 and 10 p.m. on Sunday. KFYR-TV anchors include Monica Hannan and Alan Miller. Country Morning Today, Noon Report, and First News at 5:00 are simulcast across the entire four-station network, along with all weekend newscasts.

KMOT produces its own newscasts from Monday through Friday weekdays at 6 and 10 p.m., and rebroadcasts KFYR-TV's other newscasts. KUMV airs its own newscasts from Monday through Friday at 6 and 10 p.m. The first 10 minutes (which includes regional news and weather) originate at KFYR in Bismarck. KUMV has its own news and sports anchor who fill the remaining 20 minutes. It simulcasts KFYR's other newscasts. From 2002 to 2007, KMOT was forced to cut its newscasts to 20 minutes while simulcasting the first 10 minutes of KFYR-TV's 6 and 10 p.m. newscasts, much as KUMV does now. In January 2007, KMOT began airing full 30-minute newscasts at 6 and 10 p.m. once again. It also added a weatherman and photographer/reporter to the staff.

KQCD once had its own news department consisting of bureau chief Brian Howell and reporter Cebe Schneider, whose stories aired on KFYR-TV's newscasts. They were the only reporters based in southwestern North Dakota. However, they were let go in 2012 due to budget cutbacks. KQCD currently has a reporter that contributes to KFYR-produced newscasts.

The stations occasionally share stories with co-owned KVLY-TV. The five stations simulcast major North Dakota sporting events and statewide political debates under the NBC North Dakota brand name and share certain equipment, such as remote broadcasting vehicles. On April 30, 2012, NBC North Dakota began broadcasting its local newscasts in high definition.

KFYR-TV received international attention when newly hired weekend co-anchor A. J. Clemente uttered several obscenities during his first broadcast on April 21, 2013, after mispronouncing the name of London Marathon winner Tsegaye Kebede. Even though he was unaware he was on air, Clemente was immediately suspended from KFYR following that evening's 5 p.m. newscast, according to a statement released by news director/anchor Monica Hannan. That night, co-anchor Van Tieu apologized on-air on behalf of the station. Hannan fired Clemente the following day, according to a post from his Twitter account. Clemente was mocked by David Letterman on the Late Show's Top 10 List on April 23, 2013 (then appeared as a guest the following day). On April 24, 2013, Clemente appeared on Today to discuss the incident (seeking to redeem himself and hopeful for a second chance somewhere in addition to acknowledging he had no 'animosity' about being fired by KFYR). The same day, he sought that "second chance" with an opportunity to speak on Inside Edition.

The Fox-affiliated subchannel debuted West Dakota Fox News at Nine during October 2014, originating from KFYR's studios in Bismarck.

== Technical information ==
=== Subchannels ===
The station's signal is multiplexed:

Subchannels of KFYR-TV
Subchannel	Res.	Short name	Programming
5.1	1080i	KFYR-DT	NBC
5.2	720p	WD FOX	Fox
5.3	480i	MeTV ND	MeTV
5.4	480i	Outlaw	Outlaw
5.5	480i	Quest	Quest
5.6	480i	Grit	Grit

=== Analog-to-digital conversion ===
KFYR-TV shut down its analog signal, over VHF channel 5, on February 16, 2009, the day prior to the original date on which full-power television stations in the United States were set to transition from analog to digital broadcasts under federal mandate (which was later rescheduled for June 12, 2009). The station's digital signal remained on its pre-transition UHF channel 31, using virtual channel 5.

=== Satellite stations ===
KFYR-TV serves one of the largest markets in the country. It extends its over-the-air coverage area through a network of three full-power stations encompassing much of the western and central two-thirds of North Dakota and parts of eastern Montana and northwestern South Dakota, branded as NBC North Dakota.

These stations mostly rebroadcast KFYR. However, they all identify as separate stations in their own right, and air separate station identifications and local commercials, as well as different programming if desired. KMOT produces its own local 6 p.m. and 10 p.m. newscasts on weekdays, while KUMV airs 20-minute local inserts into KMOT's newscasts. KQCD airs a time-shifted feed of KFYR in Mountain Time for most of the day, except for identifications and commercials.

Station	City of license	Channels TV (RF)	First air date	Call sign meaning	ERP	HAAT	Facility ID	Transmitter coordinates
KMOT	Minot	10; 10 (VHF)	January 23, 1958	Minot	7.69 kW	207 m	41425	48°12′55.3″N 101°19′7.8″W
KQCD-TV	Dickinson	7; 7 (VHF)	July 28, 1980	Queen City Dickinson	11.3 kW	205 m	41430	46°56′53″N 102°59′25″W
KUMV-TV	Williston	8; 8 (VHF)	February 6, 1957	Upper Missouri Valley	6 kW	323 m	41429	48°8′2.3″N 103°51′37.9″W

== See also ==
- KMOT
- KQCD-TV
- KUMV-TV
- KVLY-TV
