= KQCD-TV =

Television station in Dickinson, North Dakota

Semi-satellite of KFYR-TV, Bismarck, North Dakota

- Dickinson, North Dakota; United States
- Channels: Digital: 7 (VHF); Virtual: 7
- Branding: KQCD-TV; NBC North Dakota; West Dakota Fox (7.2); MeTV North Dakota (7.3)

Programming
- Network: NBC North Dakota
- Affiliations: 7.1: NBC; 7.2: Fox; 7.3: MeTV

Ownership
- Owner: Gray Media; (Gray Television Licensee, LLC)
- Sister stations: KFYR-TV, KMOT, KUMV-TV

History
- First air date: June 1, 1967 (current full-power license dates from July 28, 1980)
- Former call signs: K07HN (1967–1980)
- Former channel numbers: Analog: 7 (VHF, 1967–2009); Digital: 18 (UHF, until 2009)
- Former affiliations: ABC (secondary, 1967–1986)
- Call sign meaning: Queen City Dickinson

Technical information
- Licensing authority: FCC
- Facility ID: 41430
- ERP: 11.3 kW
- HAAT: 205 m (673 ft)
- Transmitter coordinates: 46°56′53″N 102°59′27″W

Links
- Public license information: Public file; LMS
- Website: www.kfyrtv.com

KQCD-TV (channel 7) is a television station in Dickinson, North Dakota, United States, affiliated with NBC and Fox. The station is owned by Gray Media, and maintains a news bureau and advertising sales office on 21st Street East in Dickinson; its transmitter is located near South Heart, North Dakota.

KQCD-TV is part of the four-station NBC North Dakota regional network of NBC affiliates in central and western North Dakota, originating from flagship station KFYR-TV (channel 5) in Bismarck. The NBC North Dakota network relays NBC network and other programming from KFYR-TV across central and western North Dakota, as well as bordering counties in Montana and South Dakota. The four stations along with fellow NBC affiliate KVLY-TV in Fargo often share news stories. Master control and some internal operations of KQCD are based at KFYR-TV's facilities on North 4th Street and East Broadway Avenue in downtown Bismarck. The four stations are counted as a single unit for ratings purposes.

Though identifying as a separate station in its own right, KQCD-TV is a semi-satellite of KFYR-TV in Bismarck. While it airs separate commercials and legal identifications, for most of the day it airs a time-shifted feed of KFYR-TV in Mountain Time. Most of the station's coverage area, including Dickinson itself, is in the Mountain Time Zone, and its prime time schedule starts at 6 p.m. rather than the usual 7 p.m. for its sister stations.

== History ==
KQCD-TV debuted on July 28, 1980. It was the last station in what was then known as the Meyer Television Network to sign on, and has always been a semi-satellite of KFYR-TV. It replaced K07HN, a low-powered translator of KFYR-TV that had served the area since June 1, 1967. Until KQCD's sign-on, KDIX-TV (channel 2, now KXMA-TV) aired a few NBC programs in off-hours.

Longtime owner Marietta Meyer Ekberg sold her broadcast holdings in 1997, with the television stations going to Sunrise Television Corporation. Sunrise sold them to The Wicks Group of Companies of New York City.

Hoak Media bought KFYR-TV, KMOT, KUMV, and KQCD in July 2006, as well as KVLY-TV in Fargo and KSFY in Sioux Falls, South Dakota and its satellite stations. On November 17, 2006, the sale was approved by the Federal Communications Commission (FCC).

KQCD picked up MeTV in April 2013, with an official launch date of May 1, 2013.

On November 20, 2013, Gray Television announced it would purchase Hoak Media in a $335 million deal. Gray initially planned, through Excalibur Broadcasting, to also acquire Fox affiliate KNDX/KXND for $7.5 million and operate them under a local marketing agreement. On March 25, 2014, Prime Cities Broadcasting, owner of KNDX/KXND, requested that the FCC dismiss the sale of that station to Excalibur. This came as a result of increased scrutiny of LMAs by the FCC. Gray would instead acquire the stations' non-license assets, and, upon the closure of the Hoak purchases on June 13, 2014, shut down KNDX/KXND and moved Fox programming to subchannels of KFYR and its satellites.

== News operation ==
KQCD once aired partially separate weekday newscasts from KFYR-TV at 6 p.m. and 10 p.m., much like KUMV does today. The first 10 minutes (which included regional news and weather) originated at KFYR, while the remaining 20 minutes were filled by KQCD's own news and sports anchors. All other newscasts originated from KFYR. In 2002, severe cutbacks resulted in KQCD ending its locally focused newscasts. Since then, the only visual evidence that KQCD is a separate station has been its separate commercials and idents.

KQCD's news department was reduced to a single reporter, Cebe Schneider. In 2009, she was joined by Adam Powell as bureau chief. Powell and Schneider's stories aired on KFYR's regional newscasts. They were the only reporters based in southwestern North Dakota. However, they were fired in 2012 due to further cutbacks. KQCD still has a single reporter whose stories air on KFYR.

The stations occasionally share stories with co-owned KVLY-TV. The five stations simulcast major North Dakota sporting events and statewide political debates under the NBC North Dakota brand name and share certain equipment, such as remote broadcasting vehicles. On April 30, 2012, NBC North Dakota began broadcasting its local newscasts in high definition.

The Fox-affiliated subchannel debuted West Dakota Fox News at Nine during October 2014, originating from KFYR's studios in Bismarck.

== Technical information ==
=== Subchannels ===
The station's signal is multiplexed:

Subchannels of KQCD-TV
Channel	Res.	Short name	Programming
7.1	1080i	KQCD-DT	NBC
7.2	720p	WD FOX	Fox
7.3	480i	MeTV ND	MeTV

=== Analog-to-digital conversion ===
KQCD-TV shut down its analog signal, over VHF channel 7, on February 16, 2009, the day prior to the original date on which full-power television stations in the United States were set to transition from analog to digital broadcasts under federal mandate (which was later rescheduled for June 12, 2009). The station's digital signal relocated from its pre-transition UHF channel 18 to VHF channel 7 for post-transition operations.

=== Translators ===
- K13OW-D Baker, MT
- K13WT-D Plevna, MT

==== Former translator ====
Gray also owned KNDX-LD (channel 38) in Dickinson; this station was acquired alongside the purchase of the non-license assets of KNDX and KXND and thus simulcasts KQCD's Fox-affiliated second subchannel. As of February 4, 2018, KNDX-LD was off the air due to being displaced by T-Mobile. KNDX-LD had been granted a move to channel 28, but Gray Television surrendered KNDX-LD's license to the FCC on October 20, 2020. The FCC canceled the license the same day.

== See also ==
- KFYR-TV
- KMOT
- KUMV-TV
- KVLY-TV
- Circle 7 logo
