= KNDB =

Television station in Bismarck, North Dakota

KNDB and KNDM
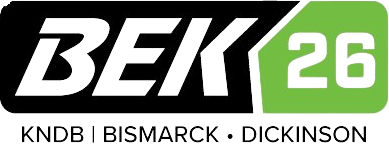

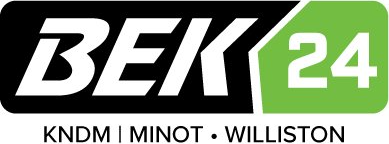

KNDB: Bismarck–Mandan, North Dakota; KNDM: Minot, North Dakota; United States
- Channels for KNDB: Digital: 26 (UHF); Virtual: 26
- Channels for KNDM: Digital: 24 (UHF); Virtual: 24
- Branding: KNDB: BEK TV/BEK 26; KNDM: BEK TV/BEK 24

Programming
- Affiliations: 26.1/24.1: BEK Sports; for others, see § Subchannels

Ownership
- Owner: BEK Communications Cooperative; (BEK Sports Network, Inc.)

History
- First air date: KNDB: November 7, 1999; KNDM: November 15, 1999
- Former call signs: KNDB: KNDX (1999–2014); KNDM: KXND (1999–2014)
- Former channel number: KNDB: Analog: 26 (UHF, 1999–2009); KNDM: Analog: 24 (UHF, 1999–2009)
- Former affiliations: Fox (1999–2014); UPN (secondary, 1999–2006); Dark (2014–2015)
- Call sign meaning: KNDB: North Dakota Bismarck; KNDM: North Dakota Minot

Technical information
- Licensing authority: FCC
- Facility ID: KNDB: 82611; KNDM: 82615
- ERP: 50 kW
- HAAT: KNDB: 300 m (984 ft); KNDM: 238.9 m (784 ft)
- Transmitter coordinates: KNDB: 46°35′23″N 100°47′40″W; KNDM: 48°3′14″N 101°26′5″W

Links
- Public license information: KNDB: Public file; LMS; KNDM: Public file; LMS
- Website: www.bek.tv

KNDB (channel 26) is a television station in Bismarck, North Dakota, United States. Owned by BEK Sports Network, Inc., a subsidiary of BEK Communications Cooperative, it is affiliated with multiple networks on various digital subchannels, with Heroes & Icons and BEK Prime on its main channel. KNDB's studios are located on East Interstate Avenue in Bismarck, and its transmitter is located near St. Anthony, North Dakota.

KNDM (channel 24) in Minot, North Dakota operates as a semi-satellite of KNDB extending its signal into the northern portion of the Bismarck–Minot market; this station's transmitter is located near South Prairie. KNDM simulcasts all programming as provided through its parent, but airs separate commercial inserts and station identifications. Although KNDM maintains an advertising sales office on 32nd Avenue SW in Minot, master control and most internal operations are based at KNDB's facilities.

From 1999 until 2014, KNDB was known as KNDX, and KNDM was known as KXND. Collectively, the stations were affiliates of Fox and were founded and previously owned by Prime Cities Broadcasting; in 2014, as part of Gray Television's acquisition of the NBC North Dakota chain from Hoak Media, Excalibur Broadcasting—a shell company affiliated with Gray, attempted to acquire KNDX/KXND from Prime Cities, and have Gray operate them under shared services agreements (SSAs). However, due to growing scrutiny surrounding such agreements and virtual duopoly operations, Gray instead acquired the stations' non-license assets and moved Fox programming to sub-channels of its statewide network of NBC affiliates on June 13, 2014, at which point KNDX and KXND went dark pending their sale to a minority owned broadcaster. The subchannels inherited KNDX/KXND's slots on area cable systems.

The stations' translators—KNDX-LD (channel 38) in Dickinson (previously K38HS) and KXND-LD (channel 38) in Williston (previously K38HA)—were sold outright to Gray and continued to carry Fox programming as a simulcast of the subchannels of NBC affiliates KQCD-TV (channel 7) and KUMV-TV (channel 8), respectively. The licenses for both translators were returned to the Federal Communications Commission (FCC) in October 2020.

== History ==
The stations signed on in November 1999 as KNDX and KXND, bringing Fox network programming to Western North Dakota for the first time. Prior to KNDX/KXND's inception, cable television subscribers in Bismarck, Minot and Dickinson received now-defunct Foxnet on cable for Fox programming, while areas east of Bismarck received Fox from KJRR in Jamestown. Prior to K38HA's inception, cable television subscribers in the Williston area received Denver's KDVR on cable for Fox programming. Rural cable companies south of Dickinson began to carry KEVN-TV from Rapid City, South Dakota for Fox programming in 1996 (replacing Foxnet), and continue to receive Fox from KEVN-LD. At the outset, KNDX and KXND also carried UPN programming during late nights; this ended when UPN shut down in 2006.

Until 2005, KNDX and KXND were known collectively as "West Dakota Fox". That year, the stations changed their monikers in favor of the station identities for their area. The "West Dakota Fox" moniker is now currently being used on the second digital subchannels of the NBC North Dakota network (KFYR-TV/KMOT).

=== LMA with KBMY/KMCY ===
From 2002 until 2008, KNDX/KXND was in a local marketing agreement (LMA), with KBMY and KMCY, the ABC affiliates of Bismarck and Minot respectively. The LMA between both stations allowed KBMY/KMCY to share the facilities, staff, and some equipment of KNDX/KXND.

The LMA with Forum Communications Company (the owners of KBMY/KMCY) ended in 2008, when Forum decided to originate programming for KBMY/KMCY remotely from their television facilities of WDAY-TV, Forum's flagship ABC station in Fargo.

=== Aborted sale to Excalibur Broadcasting; sale to Legacy Broadcasting ===
On November 20, 2013, Excalibur Broadcasting announced it would purchase KNDX/KXND for $7.5 million. Gray Television also announced its purchase of Hoak Media, owners of the NBC North Dakota chain; Gray Television was to have operated KNDX/KXND under an LMA following the sale, making them sister stations to KFYR-TV. On March 25, 2014, Prime Cities requested that the FCC dismiss the sale to Excalibur; this occurred the next day. On May 1, 2014, Gray purchased KNDX/KXND's non-license assets and assumed control of the stations through a local marketing agreement. The LMA was designed to end for the full-power KNDX and KXND licenses if Gray purchases another television station in the market, but remained in place for repeaters KNDX-LD and KXND-LP, which Gray chose to acquire outright.

At midnight on June 13, 2014, the full power signals of KNDX and KXND went off the air, and Fox programming were moved to a DT2 subchannel of KFYR-TV and its NBC North Dakota satellite stations. KNDX and KXND were then put up for sale on the stipulation that they be acquired by minority interests, which would allow the stations to continue operating on the conditions that they be operated independently of other stations (under minority, female and/or non-profit ownership) and not make any partnerships or sharing arrangements with other broadcasters.

On August 27, 2014, Gray announced that it would sell KNDX and KXND to Legacy Broadcasting, a new broadcasting company controlled by Sherry Nelson and daughter Sara Jane Ingram. In preparation for the sale, on December 2, 2014, KXND changed its call letters to KNDM; two weeks later, on December 15, KNDX became KNDB. The sale was completed on December 15.

The stations added BEK Sports in 2015, carrying area high school sports, in collaboration with KRDK-TV in Fargo/Grand Forks.

=== Sale to BEK Sports Network ===
On April 6, 2018, it was announced that BEK Sports Network, a unit of fiber-optic internet/IPTV provider BEK Communications Cooperative, would acquire KNDB and KNDM for $950,000; the sale was completed on July 31.

In August 2021, the station picked up rights to preseason games of the Green Bay Packers.

== Technical information ==
=== Subchannels ===
The stations' signals are multiplexed:

Subchannels of KNDB and KNDM
Channel		Res.	Short name		Programming
KNDB	KNDM	Res.	KNDB	KNDM	Programming
26.1	24.1	720p	BEK-TV		BEK Sports
26.2	24.2	720p	BEKSP2		BEK Sports
26.3	24.3	720p	BEKSP3		BEK Sports
26.4	24.4	720p	BEKNews		BEKNews
26.5	24.5	720p	NewsMX2		Newsmax2
26.6	24.6	480i	BEK-WX		BEK Weather

=== Analog-to-digital conversion ===
Both stations shut down their analog signals on June 12, 2009, the official date on which full-power television stations in the United States transitioned from analog to digital broadcasts under federal mandate. The station's digital channel allocations post-transition are as follows:

- KNDB shut down its analog signal, over UHF channel 26; the station "flash-cut" its digital signal into operation on UHF channel 26.
- KNDM shut down its analog signal, over UHF channel 24; the station "flash-cut" its digital signal into operation on UHF channel 24.

== Retransmission controversies ==
Prime Cities was involved in retransmission consent negotiations with Midcontinent Communications and Dish Network, along with DirecTV which were described by those providers as contentious, and resulted in removals of the channels from each of the services, including DirecTV, which discontinued their carriage. The stations were removed from Midcontinent on April 8, 2012, and were kept off that system for a month until a new carriage agreement was signed on May 16.
