= Hoak Media =

American broadcast media company

Hoak Media Corporation
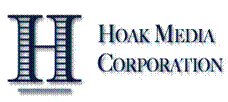
- Industry: Media
- Founded: August 2003
- Founder: James M. Hoak Jr.; Eric D. Van den Branden
- Defunct: June 13, 2014; (most stations); December 1, 2015; (officially)
- Fate: Acquired by Gray Television
- Successor: Gray Media
- Headquarters: Dallas, Texas
- Services: Broadcast television

Hoak Media Corporation was a broadcast media company based in Dallas, Texas. Hoak once owned eighteen television stations (including satellites), all in medium and small-markets, mostly in the Great Plains states and Colorado.

== History ==
Hoak Media was established in August 2003.

On November 20, 2013, Gray Television announced that it would purchase Hoak Media and Parker Broadcasting, excluding KREX (and its satellites), KFQX and WMBB (which could not be sold to Gray as it already owned stations in the markets affected), and as well as KAUZ-TV. Some of Hoak's stations were originally going to be sold to Excalibur Broadcasting and they would have been operated by Gray under local marketing agreements. On December 19, it was announced that KREX and WMBB would be sold to Nexstar Broadcasting Group, while KFQX would be sold to Mission Broadcasting.

The sale was completed on June 13, 2014. However, some stations were forced to go off the air and their programming was moved to subchannels of Gray-owned stations (and in Hastings, Nebraska, from KHAS-TV to KSNB-TV with KSNB-TV's existing programming moving to a subchannel), due to some stations unable to receive regulatory approval after the FCC's then-recent ruling on joint sales agreements. Those silent stations were later sold off to minority interests.

On August 10, 2015, Hoak announced it would sell its last remaining station, KAUZ-TV (which was not included in the sale of most of Hoak's other stations to Gray Television, and of which was originally going to be sold to KAUZ Media, Inc.), to American Spirit Media (a Charlotte, North Carolina–based company headed by Thomas B. Henson) and would be operated under a shared services agreement by Raycom Media as a result of that company's acquisition of Drewry Communications (which had operated KAUZ-TV under a joint sales agreement since 2009). The sale was completed on December 1, completing the disestablishment of Hoak.

== Former stations ==
- Stations are arranged in alphabetical order by state and city of license.

Stations owned by Hoak Media
Media market	State	Station	Purchased	Sold	Notes
Glenwood Springs	Colorado	KREG-TV	2003	2014	(Note: Satellite of KREX-TV.)
Grand Junction	Colorado	KFQX	2003	2014	(Note: Owned by Parker Broadcasting.)
Grand Junction	Colorado	KREX-TV	2003	2014	
Grand Junction	Colorado	KGJT-CD	2003	2014	
Montrose	Colorado	KREY	2003	2014	
Panama City	Florida	WMBB	2008	2014	
Alexandria	Louisiana	KALB-TV	2008	2014	
Alexandria	Louisiana	KAQY	2008	2014	
Monroe	Louisiana	KNOE-TV	2007	2014	
Hastings	Nebraska	KHAS-TV	2005	2014	
North Platte	Nebraska	KNOP-TV	2005	2014	
North Platte	Nebraska	K11TW	2005	2014	
Bismarck	North Dakota	KFYR-TV	2007	2014	
Dickinson	North Dakota	KQCD-TV	2007	2014	(Note: Satellite of KFYR-TV.)
Fargo	North Dakota	KVLY-TV	2007	2014	
Fargo	North Dakota	KXJB-TV	2007	2014	
Minot	North Dakota	KMOT	2007	2014	
Williston	North Dakota	KUMV-TV	2007	2014	
Aberdeen	South Dakota	KABY-TV	2007	2014	(Note: Satellite of KSFY-TV.)
Pierre	South Dakota	KPRY-TV	2007	2014	
Sioux Falls	South Dakota	KSFY-TV	2007	2014	
Wichita Falls	Texas	KAUZ-TV	2003	2015	(Note: Operated by Drewry Communications from 2009 to 2015.)

== Carriage with Dish Network ==
On June 5, 2012, all of Hoak's stations were pulled from Dish Network after they failed to renew a carriage agreement. The refusal to renew reportedly surrounds Dish Network's "Hopper" digital video recorder and its controversial commercial-skipping feature AutoHop—which has also led to complaints from the major U.S. television networks. Dish Network's senior vice president of programming scolded the company for its decision to pull its channels from the service, believing that their decision disrespects "customer control" over programming.
