= KVRR =

Television station in Fargo, North Dakota

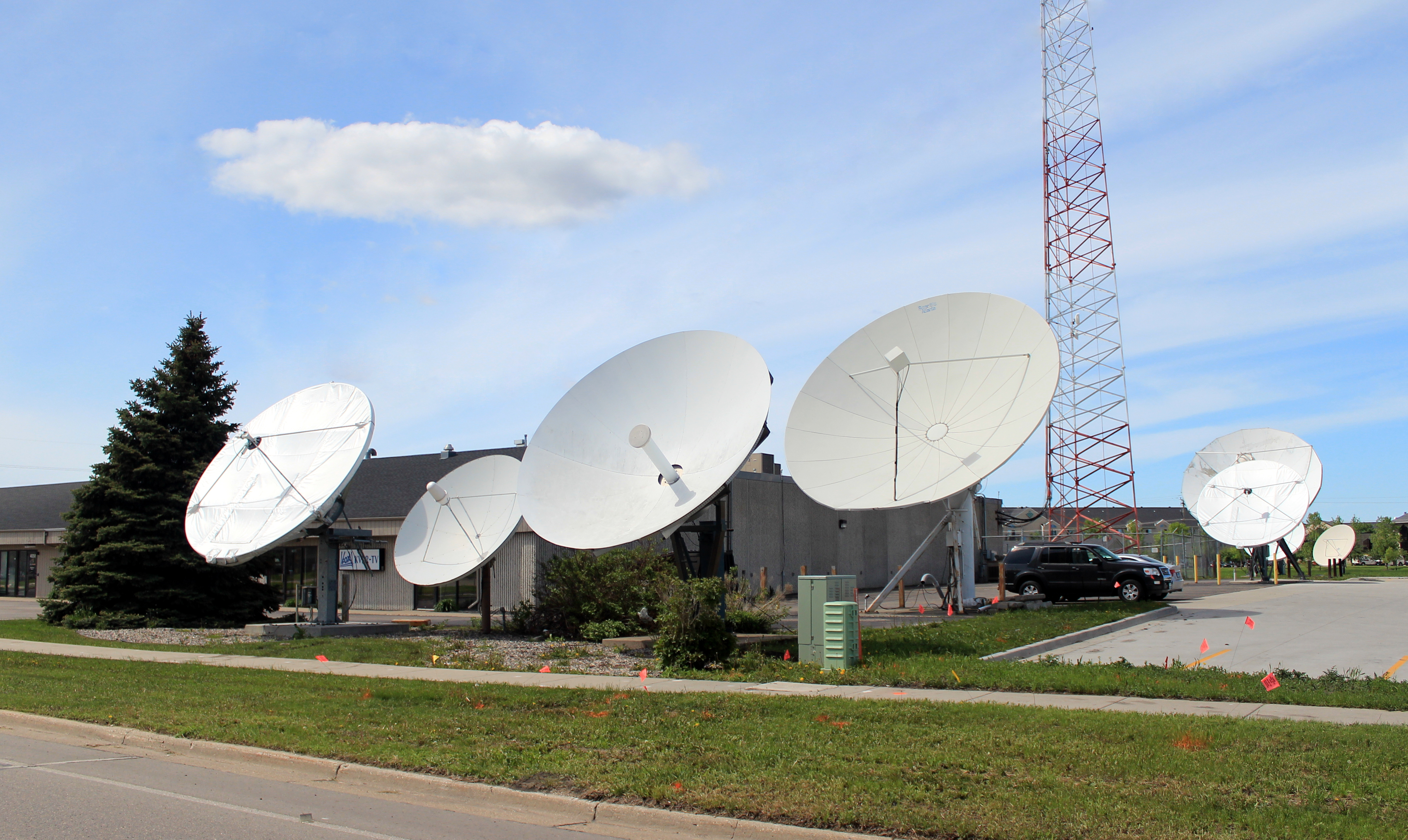
- KVRR studio in Fargo, North Dakota.
- Fargo, North Dakota; Moorhead, Minnesota; United States
- City: Fargo, North Dakota
- Channels: Digital: 19 (UHF); Virtual: 15
- Branding: KVRR; KVRR Local News

Programming
- Affiliations: 15.1: Fox; 15.2: Antenna TV

Ownership
- Owner: Coastal Television Broadcasting Company LLC; (CTND License LLC)

History
- First air date: February 14, 1983
- Former call signs: KVNJ-TV (1983–1985)
- Former channel numbers: Analog: 15 (UHF, 1983–2009)
- Former affiliations: Independent (1983–1986)
- Call sign meaning: Valley of the Red River (coverage area)

Technical information
- Licensing authority: FCC
- Facility ID: 55372
- ERP: 1,000 kW
- HAAT: 379 m (1,243 ft)
- Transmitter coordinates: 46°40′29″N 96°13′40″W
- Translator(s): see § Satellite stations and § Translators

Links
- Public license information: Public file; LMS
- Website: www.kvrr.com

KVRR (channel 15) is a television station in Fargo, North Dakota, United States, affiliated with the Fox network. Owned by Coastal Television Broadcasting Company, the station maintains studios on South 40th Street and South 9th Avenue in Fargo, and its transmitter is located near Tansem, Minnesota. KVRR also handles master control and some internal operations for sister station and fellow Fox affiliate KQDS-TV in Duluth, Minnesota.

KVRR's programming is simulcast on three full-power satellite stations: KJRR (channel 7) in Jamestown, North Dakota, KBRR (channel 10) in Thief River Falls, Minnesota (serving the Grand Forks area), and KNRR (channel 12) in Pembina, North Dakota (which also covers parts of southern Manitoba, Canada, including Winnipeg).

KVRR was the flagship television property of previous owner Red River Broadcasting, which owned the station from its inception until its sale to Coastal in 2024.

== History ==
The station first signed on the air on February 14, 1983, under the callsign KVNJ-TV, which was inspired by an FM station that launched in 1947. It was the first independent station in the Dakotas, as well as the first new standalone full-power commercial station to sign on in the Fargo–Grand Forks market in 29 years. WDAZ-TV (channel 8) in Grand Forks had signed on in 1967, but is co-owned with Fargo's WDAY-TV (channel 6).

The station changed its call letters to KVRR in 1985; that year, KBRR signed on from Thief River Falls as a satellite station serving Grand Forks. Satellite station KNRR signed on from Pembina in 1986, with intentions to target Winnipeg and southern Manitoba. Shortly afterward, on October 6, 1986, the three-station network became a charter affiliate of the upstart Fox network. However, like most early Fox affiliates, the stations still programmed themselves as independents, since Fox carried only one program at the time (The Late Show Starring Joan Rivers). KJRR in Jamestown joined KVRR's regional network in October 1988. KJRR served as the network's affiliate for the eastern portion of the Bismarck television market (excluding the city of Bismarck itself) until November 1999, when KNDX signed on as Fox's first affiliate in central North Dakota.

In December 1988, KVRR partnered with three other independent stations serving Minnesota—KTMA (now CW affiliate WUCW) in Minneapolis–Saint Paul, KXLI (now Ion Television owned-and-operated station KPXM) in St. Cloud and KXLT-TV (now a Fox affiliate) in Rochester—to create a new regional television network called the Minnesota Independent Network (MIN). Despite good intentions, the network never got off the ground.

The stations also carried programming from the United Paramount Network (UPN) on a tape delay from the network's debut on January 16, 1995, until its programming was dropped in 1998, due to the presence of Minneapolis UPN affiliate KMSP-TV on cable providers in most of KVRR's viewing area (when KMSP became a Fox owned-and-operated station in September 2002, KCPM in Grand Forks signed on as a full-time UPN station in 2003).

KVRR's last logo while branded simply "Fox", used from March 2014 through early 2015.

From the mid-1990s until March 2015, KVRR did not include any regional, channel, or call letter branding on-air outside of Federal Communications Commission (FCC)-required station identifications, a rarity among American television stations. The four stations were collectively branded as "Your Fox Station" or simply "Fox". When the station began a news department in 2000, it was branded as Fox News. The station began phasing out the "Fox" branding in favor of simply branding by the KVRR call letters in March 2015. Station management stated that the rebrand was done to bring its branding in line with the Fargo market's other major network stations, all but one of which (CBS affiliate KXJB-LD, which brands by its former channel number as "KX4", now occupied by KRDK-TV) has long branded with their call letters. The move was also intended to distinguish the station from Fox News Channel; KVRR is one of only a handful of Fox affiliates that omits network references in their branding. KVRR launched a website on September 15, 2011.

In the summer of 2015, Red River Broadcasting announced that Antenna TV would be carried on the digital subchannels of all of its owned TV stations and satellite stations on January 1, 2016, including KVRR (relayed on KBRR, KJRR, and KNRR), KQDS-TV in Duluth, and KDLT-TV in Sioux Falls, South Dakota (relayed on KDLV in Mitchell); KDLT/KDLV would soon be sold to Gray Television in 2018, though continuing to broadcast Antenna TV on its own.

On November 30, 2021, Forum Communications (owner of WDAY/WDAZ) announced its intent to purchase KVRR and its satellites, as well as KQDS, from Red River Broadcasting for $24 million. Forum had sought a waiver from the FCC allowing it to own a second top–four ranked full-power station in the Fargo–Grand Forks market, though it would not consolidate the newsrooms of WDAY and KVRR. In the absence of FCC action, the deal was terminated in June 2023. On December 1, 2023, it was announced that Red River would sell the stations to the Coastal Television Broadcasting Group; the sale was completed on April 5, 2024.

=== KNRR and the old KCND ===
KNRR (channel 12) operates on a channel frequency previously occupied by KCND-TV, a station formerly owned by Gordon McLendon. In September 1975, Izzy Asper acquired the station and relocated it to Winnipeg, relaunching as CKND-TV on VHF channel 9 (now an owned-and-operated station of the Global Television Network). Ten years later, in 1986, channel 12 returned to the air as a semi-satellite of KVRR.

The coverage area of KNRR's analog signal included Winnipeg, which has almost double the population of KVRR's entire primary service area in North Dakota and western Minnesota. However, the Canadian Radio-television and Telecommunications Commission (CRTC) barred Winnipeg-area cable systems from carrying KNRR due to concerns that local advertisers would purchase time on KNRR rather than on television stations in the Winnipeg market. As a result, Rogers Cable systems in the Winnipeg area carry WUHF in Rochester, New York, as the Fox station available in the market, while MTS TV carries Fox's owned-and-operated station in Minneapolis–Saint Paul, KMSP-TV.

Even during the analog television era, when the northern fringe of KNRR's grade B signal contour encompassed Winnipeg, KNRR was all but impossible to receive in the River Heights and North End neighborhoods of the city, and was also subject to interference from hydro lines and telephone relay stations. Over time, KNRR's transmitter degraded and was not replaced, further reducing the signal quality.

KNRR shut down its signal on June 12, 2009, when the digital television transition took place. KNRR had not installed a digital transmitter, and its post-transition digital allotment on UHF channel 15 had already been reassigned to PBS member station KGFE as that station's post-transition allocation. Although it easily could have ceased operations permanently, the station's digital signal resumed operation in late October 2009, albeit operating at a very low power.

Although it can be received in several rural counties in North Dakota and Minnesota, the station's largest potential audience lies in the urban centers of southern Manitoba, including Altona, Morden and Winkler, and fringe coverage of Winnipeg.

== News operation ==
Previous KVRR FOX News logo until 2014.

KVRR presently broadcasts 18 1/2 hours of locally produced newscasts each week (with 3 1/2 hours each weekday and one hour on Sundays; the station does not air newscasts on Saturdays). As with most programming, KVRR's newscasts are simulcast on satellite stations KJRR, KBRR and KNRR, with separate Grand Forks area commercials occasionally inserted on KBRR/KNRR.

KVRR launched its news department in July 2000, when it debuted a half-hour nightly newscast at 9 p.m., becoming the first prime time newscast in the Fargo market. In 2009, the station debuted a half-hour weeknight-only newscast at 6 p.m. On September 19, 2011, the 9 p.m. newscast was expanded from 35 minutes to one hour. On February 5, 2014, KVRR became the third and last television news operation in the Fargo–Grand Forks market (after KXJB-TV 4/KVLY 11 and WDAY 6/WDAZ 8) to begin broadcasting its local newscasts in high definition.

== Technical information ==
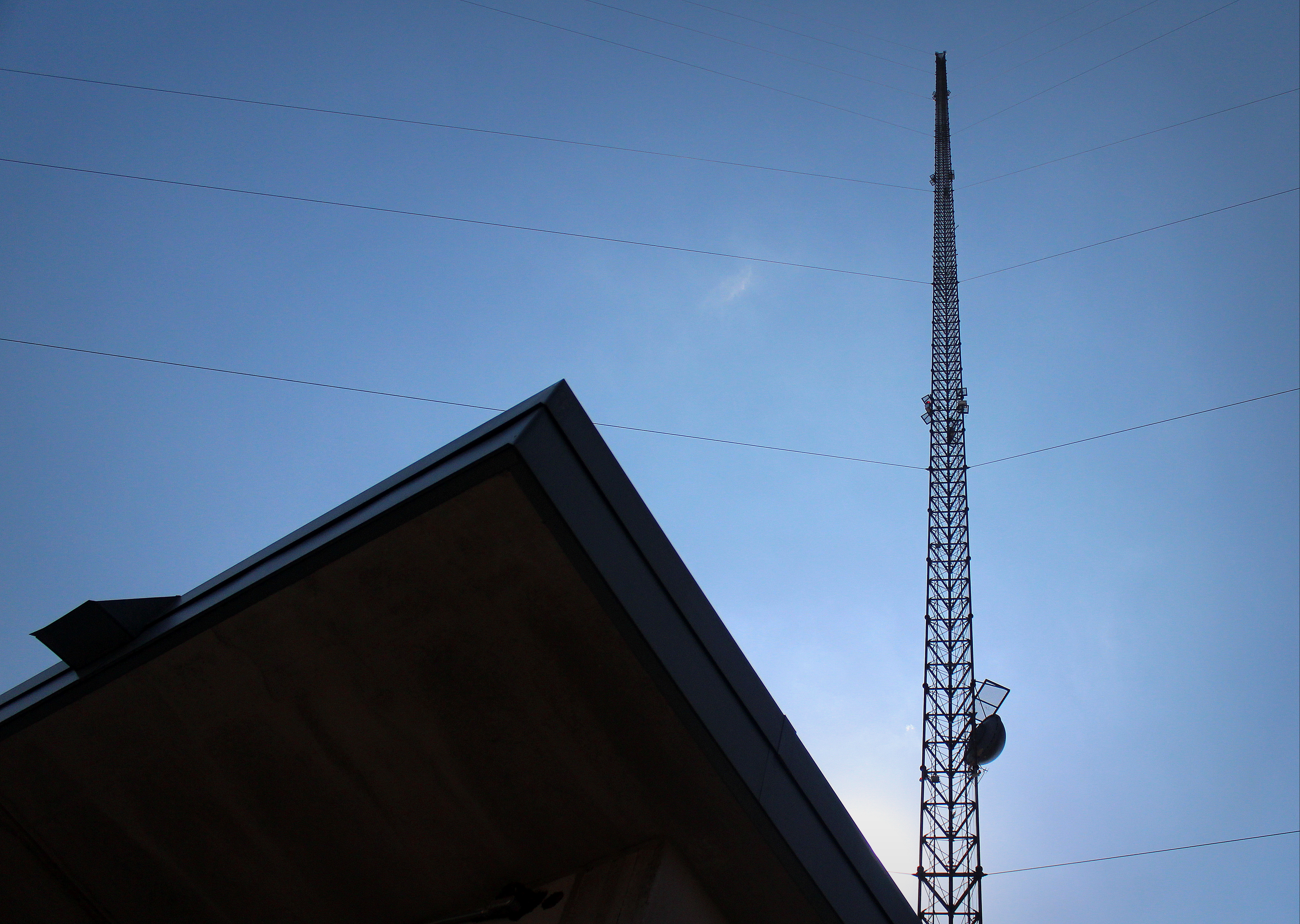
KVRR tower in Tansem, Minnesota.

=== Subchannels ===
The station's signal is multiplexed:

Subchannels of KVRR
Channel	Res.	Short name	Programming
15.1	720p	KVRR-DT	Fox
15.2	480i	ANTENNA	Antenna TV

=== Analog-to-digital conversion ===
In the early 2000s, KVRR became the first commercial television station (the first being Prairie Public Television member stations KFME (channel 13), KGFE in Grand Forks and KCGE-DT in Crookston, Minnesota) in eastern North Dakota to transmit a digital signal.

KVRR shut down its analog signal, over UHF channel 15, on February 1, 2009. The station's digital signal remained on its pre-transition UHF channel 19, using virtual channel 15.

KVRR and KJRR were the only stations in KVRR's regional network to broadcast programming in high definition until March 2011, when KBRR and KNRR upgraded their digital signals to transmit programming in HD. On March 18, 2011, Midcontinent Communications added KBRR's HD feed on its systems in Grand Forks and Devils Lake as it became available.

=== Satellite stations ===
KVRR operates three full-power satellite stations: KJRR, KBRR, and KNRR. These stations fully simulcast KVRR, but KBRR and KNRR occasionally air separate commercials for Grand Forks and the northern portion of the viewing area. Aside from their transmitters, the satellite stations do not maintain any physical presence in their cities of license.

Station	City of license (other locations served)	Channel	First air date	Second letter of callsign meaning	ERP	HAAT	Facility ID	Transmitter coordinates	Public license information
KJRR	Jamestown (Valley City)	Digital: 7 (VHF); Virtual: 7	October 1988	Jamestown, North Dakota	21.3 kW	135 m (443 ft)	55364	46°55′25.5″N 98°46′20.2″W	Public file; LMS
KBRR	Thief River Falls, MN (Grand Forks)	Digital: 10 (VHF); Virtual: 10	September 22, 1985	Red River Broadcasting Company	9.3 kW	198.1 m (650 ft)	55370	47°58′38″N 96°36′18″W	Public file; LMS
KNRR	Pembina (Southern Manitoba/Winnipeg)	Digital: 12 (VHF); Virtual: 12	January 1, 1986	Northern North Dakota	4.4 kW	427 m (1,401 ft)	55362	48°59′44″N 97°24′28″W	Public file; LMS

=== Translators ===
KVRR serves its large coverage area with three translators. All are owned by local municipalities and relay satellite station KBRR.

- K16KE-D Baudette, MN
- K26OH-D Roseau, MN
- K36LW-D Williams, MN

KVRR and its satellite stations originally relayed its programming on a large network of translators throughout eastern North Dakota and west-central Minnesota. However, only one remains relaying KBRR and two more relaying KBRR in Lake of the Woods County were added as multiplexed digital subchannels after their transition to digital broadcasts in 2011. K26OH-D/Roseau is owned by Roseau County and K16KE/Baudette and K36LW/Williams are owned by Lake of the Woods County.

K61BJ in Donnelly, Minnesota, K54AT in Brainerd, Minnesota, K33HB in Devils Lake, North Dakota (relaying KNRR), and K05IV in Park Rapids, Minnesota, are no longer actively used as translators of KVRR. K61BJ was thought to be in operation by KVRR, but due to lack of communication it was found that the translator was damaged beyond repair by a lightning strike in 2005. K54AT was taken off the air in mid-April 2008, never to return. This was due to several reasons, the most significant being that the Brainerd was already served by a translator of Twin Cities Fox O&O KMSP-TV. K33HB, which relayed KNRR, was knocked off-the-air due to a tower collapse. K05IV's license was surrendered to the FCC on June 12, 2013.

KVRR originally maintained translators in north-central Alexandria, Bemidji, Grand Rapids, Red Lake (relaying KBRR), and Walker, Minnesota. However, the Bemidji translator was forced off the air by the sign on of WFTC satellite station KFTC, which was affiliated with Fox at the time, and is now also a satellite station of current Fox affiliate KMSP-TV. The Grand Rapids translator now carries sister station KQDS-TV in Duluth, whose master control and non-news programming originates from Fargo. The Alexandria, Red Lake and Walker translators, owned by private groups, now carry stations from the Twin Cities.
