= KSFY-TV =

Television station in Sioux Falls, South Dakota

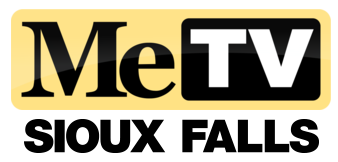
- Sioux Falls, South Dakota; United States
- Channels: Digital: 13 (VHF); Virtual: 13
- Branding: KSFY; Dakota News Now; MeTV Sioux Falls (13.3)

Programming
- Affiliations: 13.1: ABC; for others, see § Subchannels

Ownership
- Owner: Gray Media; (Gray Television Licensee, LLC)
- Sister stations: KDLT, KDLV

History
- First air date: July 31, 1960
- Former call signs: KSOO-TV (1960–1974)
- Former channel numbers: Analog: 13 (VHF, 1960–2009); Digital: 29 (UHF, until 2009)
- Former affiliations: NBC (1960–1983); ABC (secondary 1960–1969)
- Call sign meaning: Sioux Falls, disambiguation of last call letter for former owner Forum's flagship station WDAY

Technical information
- Licensing authority: FCC
- Facility ID: 48658
- ERP: 22.7 kW
- HAAT: 610 m (2,001 ft)
- Transmitter coordinates: 43°31′7″N 96°32′5.7″W

Links
- Public license information: Public file; LMS
- Website: www.dakotanewsnow.com

KSFY-TV (channel 13) is a television station in Sioux Falls, South Dakota, United States, affiliated with ABC. It is owned by Gray Media alongside dual NBC/Fox affiliate KDLT-TV (channel 46). The two stations share studios in Courthouse Square on 1st Avenue South in Sioux Falls; KSFY-TV's transmitter is located near Rowena, South Dakota.

== History ==
The station debuted on July 31, 1960, as KSOO-TV, the second station in Sioux Falls. It was owned by the South Dakota Broadcasting Company along with KSOO radio and was an NBC affiliate with a secondary ABC affiliation. From 1960 to 1969, it operated as the flagship of a regional network with separately-owned KORN-TV in Mitchell (channel 5, now KDLT-TV on channel 46). KSOO-TV served the eastern portion of the market, while KORN-TV served the western portion. In 1969, the Federal Communications Commission (FCC) forced the breakup of this network, and KSOO-TV became the sole NBC affiliate. In 1970, it bought KXAB-TV in Aberdeen to boost its coverage in northeastern South Dakota. As part of the sale, KXAB's calls changed to KCOO-TV.

South Dakota Broadcasting was liquidated in 1973; the television stations had not shown a profit since 1968. The television stations were bought by Forum Publishing Company of Fargo, North Dakota in 1974 and switched their call letters respectively to the current KSFY and KABY. KPRY-TV in Pierre was added a year later in 1976. In September 1983, KSFY swapped affiliations with channel 5, then recently renamed KDLT and became an ABC affiliate. ABC was the top-rated network at the time and wanted to be on a stronger station. Additionally, KSFY had three full-power transmitters to KDLT's one, and Forum's flagship stations WDAY and WDAZ in the eastern part of North Dakota were also converting to ABC affiliations at the same time.

Forum sold the KSFY stations to AFLAC in 1985. In 1996, AFLAC sold its broadcasting division to Retirement Systems of Alabama, who merged it with Ellis Communications to form Raycom Media. In 2004, Raycom sold the KSFY stations to The Wicks Group of Companies.

Hoak Media bought KSFY and its satellite stations in July 2006, as well as KVLY-TV and KXJB-TV (LMA with Catamount Broadcasting) of Fargo and KFYR-TV of Bismarck, North Dakota and its satellite stations. The sale was approved by the FCC on November 17, 2006. On November 20, 2013, Hoak announced the sale of most of its stations, including KSFY and its satellites to Gray Television. The sale was completed on June 13, 2014.

On May 1, 2018; Gray announced it had agreed to buy KDLT from owner Red River Broadcasting for $32.5 million. The combined operation would be based at KSFY's studios; in its announcement of the KDLT purchase, Gray noted that the KSFY studio has enough space to house a second station's news and sales department. Gray needed to obtain a waiver in order to complete the deal, since the FCC normally does not allow one person to own two of the four highest-rated stations in a market. However, in its filing requesting such a waiver, Gray argued that KDLT would be in a stronger position to compete in the market if its resources were combined with those of KSFY. Gray contended that a KSFY/KDLT duopoly would fulfill "a dire need for an effective competitor" in the Sioux Falls market, where KELO-TV has been the far-and-away leader for as long as records have been kept. The sale was approved by the FCC on September 24, 2019, and was completed the following day. Soon afterward, on January 13, 2020, KDLT moved its studios from South Westport Avenue to KSFY's studios on Courthouse Square.

In 2020, Gray acquired the non-license assets of area Fox affiliate KTTW and placed Fox programming on KDLT's second subchannel. This resulted in all of the network affiliations in eastern South Dakota being controlled by just two companies, Gray and KELO-TV owner Nexstar Media Group.

== News operation ==
KSFY logo, used from 2008 to 2011.

Logo of Dakota News Now.

Currently, KSFY broadcasts a total of 19 1/2 hours of local newscasts each week with 3 1/2 hours on weekdays and one hour each on Saturdays and Sundays. KSFY has been nominated for numerous Midwest Emmy Awards.

On August 1, 2011, KSFY became the first television station in the Sioux Falls market and in the state of South Dakota to begin producing its local newscasts in high definition from their studio only and not from the field; the station unveiled a new HD-ready set, dropped Action News from its newscast and station branding, and renamed its newscasts as KSFY News (which the station used from 2004 to 2008).

With the purchase of KDLT, KSFY and KDLT merged their news operations on January 13, 2020, rebranding as Dakota News Now.

== Technical information ==
The stations' signals are multiplexed, but not with the same programming. This is because KPRY-TV carries NBC and Fox programming on its second and third subchannels.

=== KSFY-TV subchannels ===
Subchannels of KSFY-TV
Subchannel	Res.	Short name	Programming
13.1	720p	KSFY-TV	ABC
13.2	720p	Outlaw	Outlaw
13.3	480i	MeTV	MeTV
13.4	480i	T-Crime	True Crime Network
13.5	480i	StartTV	Start TV
13.6	480i	MeToons	MeTV Toons

=== KPRY-TV subchannels ===
Subchannels of KPRY-TV
Subchannel	Res.	Short name	Programming
4.1	720p	KPRY-TV	ABC
46.1	720p	KDLT-TV	NBC (KDLT-TV)
46.2	720p	Fox	Fox (KDLT-TV)

Simulcast of subchannels of another station

On September 10, 2012, KSFY-TV added programming from The CW on a new second digital subchannel. It was part of The CW Plus, and replaced KWSD as Sioux Falls' CW affiliate. As of September 2015, MeTV moved to 13.3, which also moved from KWSD.

=== Analog-to-digital conversion ===
KSFY-TV shut down its analog signal, over VHF channel 13, on February 17, 2009, the original target date on which full-power television stations in the United States were to transition from analog to digital broadcasts under federal mandate (which was later pushed back to June 12, 2009). The station's digital signal relocated from its pre-transition UHF channel 29 to VHF channel 13 for post-transition operations.

== Translators ==
=== Satellite stations ===
KSFY is rebroadcast on a satellite station in central South Dakota:

Station	City of license	Channels TV (RF)	First air date	Call letters' meaning	ERP	HAAT	Facility ID	Transmitter coordinates	Public license information
KPRY-TV	Pierre	4; 19 (UHF)	January 30, 1976	Pierre	311 kW	347 m (1,138 ft)	48660	44°3′7.2″N 100°5′4.2″W	Public file LMS

KSFY was previously rebroadcast on a satellite station in northeastern South Dakota:

Station	City of license (other cities served)	Channels TV (RF)	First air date	Last air date	Call letters' meaning	ERP	HAAT	Facility ID	Transmitter coordinates
KABY-TV ^{1}	Aberdeen (Watertown)	9; 9 (VHF)	November 27, 1958	January 12, 2017 (License canceled on April 6, 2018)	Aberdeen	19.4 kW	427 m (1,401 ft)	48659	45°6′22.9″N 97°53′58″W

Notes:

- ^{1} KABY-TV used the callsign KXAB-TV from its 1958 sign-on to 1970 and then KCOO-TV from 1970 to 1975. The station went silent on January 5, 2016, when its tower was taken down after failing an inspection, and again on January 12, 2017, after briefly broadcasting from a low-power facility. KABY's license was returned to the FCC for cancellation on April 6, 2018; its call sign was transferred to a Gray-owned low-power station in Sioux Falls.

=== Translators ===
KSFY is rebroadcast on the following translator stations:

- K36NW-D Aberdeen
- K25OU-D Brookings
- K14IO-D Pierre
- K20PH-D Sioux Falls
- K32DK-D Watertown
- K18MO-D Worthington, MN

Until 2013, programming from KSFY was also rebroadcast on translator K07QL in Mitchell.

== Out-of-market cable coverage ==
Some cable systems like CSI Cable in Jamestown, North Dakota, discontinued carrying KSFY-TV after January 1, 2009, due to duplication of networks already carried.
