= KRDK-TV =

Television station in Valley City, North Dakota

- Valley City–Fargo–; Grand Forks, North Dakota; United States
- City: Valley City, North Dakota
- Channels: Digital: 24 (UHF); Virtual: 4
- Branding: KRDK 4

Programming
- Affiliations: 4.1: Cozi TV/MyNetworkTV; for others, see § Subchannels

Ownership
- Owner: Major Market Broadcasting; (Parker Broadcasting of Dakota License, LLC)

History
- First air date: August 1, 1954
- Former call signs: KXJB-TV (1954–2014); KNDF-TV (2014–2015)
- Former channel numbers: Analog: 4 (VHF, 1954–2009); Digital: 38 (UHF, until 2019)
- Former affiliations: CBS (1954–2014); ABC (secondary, 1954–1959); United (secondary, 1967); Dark (2014–2015); Heroes & Icons (April−September 2015); NewsNet (2019–2024)
- Call sign meaning: Ravi D. Kapur, Major Market Broadcasting president; or "Regional Dakota"

Technical information
- Licensing authority: FCC
- Facility ID: 49134
- ERP: 285 kW
- HAAT: 573 m (1,880 ft)
- Transmitter coordinates: 47°16′45″N 97°20′26″W

Links
- Public license information: Public file; LMS

KRDK-TV (channel 4) is a television station licensed to Valley City, North Dakota, United States, serving the Fargo–Grand Forks market. Owned by Major Market Broadcasting, it is affiliated with multiple networks on various digital subchannels, with Cozi TV and MyNetworkTV on its main channel. KRDK-TV's offices are located on Winter Show Road in Valley City.

KRDK-TV's transmitter tower, located near Galesburg, North Dakota, stands at 2,060 feet (628 m). It was the second tallest man-made structure on Earth when it was built in 1966. It is currently the seventh tallest structure in the world. In the United States, it is second only to the Petronius oil platform in the Gulf of Mexico and is still the tallest broadcasting tower in the Western Hemisphere.

The station launched in December 1954 as KXJB-TV, the CBS affiliate for the market. KXJB consolidated with NBC affiliate KVLY-TV in 2003 under a local marketing agreement. In 2014, the station's non-license assets were acquired by KVLY's new owner Gray Television; due to increasing scrutiny by the Federal Communications Commission (FCC) surrounding local marketing agreements and similar arrangements, Gray decided against having the station acquired by an affiliated third party to maintain the LMA. Its CBS programming was moved to KVLY's second digital subchannel in December 2014 and KXJB-LD in 2016, and KXJB's license was sold to the minority-owned Major Market Broadcasting, who re-christened the station KRDK-TV. The station returned to the air during January 2015 carrying several digital television networks.

== History ==
=== As KXJB-TV ===
KXJB-TV broadcasting from the West Acres Shopping Center with Sally Hilleboe and Jim Adelson.

KXJB-TV logo for part of the 1970s and 1980s.

Channel 4 signed on August 1, 1954, as KXJB-TV, owned by John Boler, with studios in Valley City and a 1,085-foot (331 m) tall transmitter tower near Pillsbury (15 miles (24 km) northeast of Valley City). KXJB was co-owned with the KX Television network in western North Dakota until 1971. KXJB moved its main studios to Fargo in 1963, and completed construction of its current 2,060-foot (630 m) tall tower site near Galesburg in 1966. The station was a CBS affiliate, and up until its sale in 2014 was the only major station in Fargo that had never changed its primary affiliation, although it shared ABC programming with WDAY-TV (channel 6) until KXGO-TV (channel 11, later KTHI-TV and now KVLY-TV) signed on in 1959. It was also an affiliate of the NTA Film Network. When West Acres Shopping Center opened in 1972, KXJB-TV had a studio in the mall, located roughly where the food court is today. The station broadcast its daytime local-origination programs from the mall and also its early evening newscast. The West Acres studio was closed in less than two years. The station was the first to broadcast live color programs in the state on June 11, 1968.

KXJB was one of only four CBS stations not to carry the Late Show with David Letterman when it premiered; the program aired instead on Fox affiliate KVRR (channel 15). Sioux City, Iowa, affiliate KMEG also declined to alter its syndicated lineup, along with lame duck CBS affiliates WITI in Milwaukee (which would switch to Fox a year after) and WBAL-TV in Baltimore (which switched to NBC 1½ years later due to the deal between CBS and Group W). This led Sioux City to become known as the "home office" on Late Show; both KXJB and KMEG began airing the show in 1994.

KXJC-LP
Defunct semi-satellite of KXJB-TV
- Grand Forks, North Dakota; United States
- Channels: Analog: 35 (UHF)
- Branding: CBS 35

Programming
- Affiliations: CBS (2000–2003)

Ownership
- Owner: Catamount Broadcasting; (Catamount Broadcasting of Fargo, LLC)
- Sister stations: KXJB-TV

History
- First air date: December 11, 2000
- Last air date: April 30, 2003
- Call sign meaning: disambiguation of KXJB

Technical information
- Class: LPTV

=== KXJC (CBS 35) Grand Forks ===
KXJB-TV's tower location (along with KVLY) was intended to provide a strong over-the-air signal to both the Fargo–Moorhead and Grand Forks metro areas. All of eastern North Dakota and northwestern Minnesota is considered one giant television market. The other three network affiliates (WDAY, KFME, and KVRR) do not have the reach of KVLY or KXJB/KRDK, and use full-power satellite stations to provide both their signal to the market and advertising specific to Grand Forks.

In July 2000, Catamount Broadcasting purchased the construction permit for KXJC-LP, channel 35, from Central Plains Media. KXJC signed on for the first time on December 11, 2000, as a locally focused CBS affiliate for Grand Forks. The station was known as "CBS 35" and was carried on Midcontinent cable channel 21 in Grand Forks. KXJB was still carried on Midcontinent cable channel 4 in Grand Forks while KXJC was on the air. Although the main KXJB signal covered Grand Forks very well (city-grade), KXJC was launched to compete against Grand Forks ABC affiliate WDAZ-TV (channel 8), a semi-satellite of WDAY-TV (channel 6) in Fargo. WDAZ had long been the only station airing a full schedule of local news for the Grand Forks area. The combination of WDAY-TV and WDAZ had long been the market's ratings leader.

Although KXJC was considered a separate station in its own right, it was a semi-satellite of KXJB. It simulcast most of KXJB's network and syndicated programming (although it had some shows not seen on KXJB such as Jerry Springer and Jenny Jones), but produced separate weeknight newscasts and aired its own commercials and station identifications. KXJC also had an FCC construction permit to increase power from 10,000 watts to 60,000 watts, which would have expanded the coverage area for its over-the-air signal to reach Grafton, North Dakota and Thief River Falls, Minnesota.

On April 30, 2003, KXJC went silent; its license was canceled that July. The move came several months after an agreement for NBC affiliate KVLY-TV to manage KXJB was announced.

=== KXJB's LMA with KVLY ===
Former KXJB logo from 2004 until 2014.

In April 2003, Catamount entered into a local marketing agreement with KVLY-TV's then owner, Wicks Group. In 2004, the station was consolidated into KVLY's facilities. In November 2005, KXJB became the second major network affiliate in Fargo (after KVLY-TV) to broadcast in high definition. In 2006, KXJB and KVLY were each sold to different owners: KXJB to Parker Broadcasting and KVLY-TV to Hoak Media. Hoak's acquisition of KVLY was approved by the FCC on November 17, 2006, while the sale of KXJB was approved in January 2007. In April 2007, KVLY-TV and KXJB-TV began simulcasting weekend newscasts, and in November, the stations began simulcasting news during weekdays under the name Valley News Live.

=== Sale to Major Market Broadcasting and relaunch as KRDK ===
On November 20, 2013, Parker Broadcasting announced the sale of its stations, including KXJB-TV, to Excalibur Broadcasting. The deal was concurrent with the sale of most Hoak Media stations (including KVLY-TV) to Gray Television; Excalibur's other stations are operated by Gray under local marketing agreements. However, in response to heightened scrutiny by the FCC over LMAs and similar agreements, Gray announced that it would acquire the non-license assets of six stations from the Hoak and Parker deal, including KXJB, move their programming to digital subchannels of existing Gray stations in the affected markets (in this case, KVLY) and divest their licenses to minority-owned broadcasters who would operate them independently and not enter into any LMAs or similar agreements with Gray.

The station was eventually sold to Major Market Broadcasting (MMB), a minority-owned company whose operations include San Francisco Bay Area station KAXT-CD and the South Asian television network Diya TV. On November 12, 2014, a simulcast of KXJB's programming was added to KVLY-DT2; on November 30, 2014, at 11:05 p.m. CT during its 10 p.m. newscast (which was delayed along with CBS' prime time schedule due to a long-running NFL game), KXJB went dark, with its CBS programming continuing on the KVLY subchannel. The purchase by Major Market Broadcasting was completed on December 18, 2014.

On December 24, MMB changed the station's call letters to KNDF-TV; a few weeks later, on January 13, 2015, the call letters became KRDK-TV. The station began carrying Cozi TV, Grit and Escape networks upon returning to the air in January 2015. The main channel carried paid programming and required public affairs and E/I programming in the interim. KRDK rearranged its channel lineup and added Movies! and Decades networks to new subchannels in March 2015. In April 2015, KRDK-TV added Heroes & Icons to subchannel 4.1 and the comedy-oriented Laff to subchannel 4.8. The station officially launched on September 25, 2015, rearranged its channel lineup, and added Bek Sports (area high school sports in collaboration with KNDB channel 26 in Bismarck and KNDM channel 24 in Minot), Comet, and Buzzr to its channel lineup. H&I, Decades, and Movies! were removed in August 2016, and replaced by Bounce TV.

KRDK took the MyNetworkTV schedule as a late-night 11 p.m. to 1 a.m. offering in May 2021. In August of that year, the station picked up rights to preseason games of the Green Bay Packers.

== Technical information ==
=== Subchannels ===
The station's signal is multiplexed:

Subchannels of KRDK-TV
Subchannel	Res.	Short name	Programming
4.1	720p	KRDK-TV	Cozi TV (1 a.m.–11 p.m. weekdays, 24 hours weekends); MyNetworkTV (11 p.m.–1 a.m. weeknights)
4.4	480i	Mystery	Ion Mystery
4.5	480i	Bounce	Bounce TV
4.6	480i	Laff	Laff
4.7	480i	OANPlus	One America Plus
4.8	480i	AWEPlus	AWE Plus
4.9	480i	Quest	Quest
4.10	480i	GetTV	Great
4.11	480i	DiyaTV	Diya TV
4.12	480i	JTV	Jewelry TV

=== Analog-to-digital conversion ===
KRDK-TV (as KXJB-TV) shut down its analog signal, over VHF channel 4, on February 16, 2009, the day prior to the original date on which full-power television stations in the United States were set to transition from analog to digital broadcasts under federal mandate (which was later rescheduled for June 12, 2009). The station's digital signal remained on its pre-transition UHF channel 38. On August 15, 2020, the FCC licensed and approved the completion of the spectrum repack putting the station on digital channel 24, using virtual channel 4.

== Cable carriage ==
From 1968 until the mid-1980s, KXJB was carried by cable systems across neighboring Manitoba and northwest Ontario. This included Winnipeg, which is several times larger than the station's entire American coverage area. These arrangements ended in 1986, when the Canadian cable companies were granted permission to replace most of the North Dakota stations with network affiliates from Detroit due to complaints about poor reception.

After an ice storm on April 6, 1997, caused the KXJB-TV mast to collapse, some cable systems replaced KXJB with KXMB from Bismarck, KXMC from Minot, KDLO from Watertown, South Dakota, KCNC from Denver, KCCO from Alexandria, Minnesota, KCCW from Walker, Minnesota, or KDLH from Duluth (depending on location) either temporarily or permanently, to maintain CBS service.

KRDK's 4.1 channel began being carried on most cable television systems starting in October 2016 due to must-carry. This resulted in moving KXJB (the previous occupant of the channel 4 license) to channel 9 on Midco and Sparklight to make room for KRDK on channel 4.

== See also ==
- Channel 4 virtual TV stations in the United States
- Channel 24 digital TV stations in the United States
- KRDK-TV mast
- Valley News Live
