= KVLY-TV =

Television station in Fargo, North Dakota

- Fargo–Grand Forks, North Dakota; Moorhead, Minnesota; United States
- City: Fargo, North Dakota
- Channels: Digital: 36 (UHF); Virtual: 11
- Branding: KVLY 11; Valley News Live; KX4 (11.2)

Programming
- Affiliations: 11.1: NBC; 11.2: CBS; for others, see § Subchannels

Ownership
- Owner: Gray Media; (Gray Television Licensee, LLC)
- Sister stations: KXJB-LD

History
- First air date: October 11, 1959
- Former call signs: KXGO-TV (1959–1963); KEND-TV (1963–1964); KTHI-TV (1964–1995)
- Former channel numbers: Analog: 11 (VHF, 1959–2009); Digital: 44 (UHF, until 2019)
- Former affiliations: ABC (1959–1983)
- Call sign meaning: Red River Valley

Technical information
- Licensing authority: FCC
- Facility ID: 61961
- ERP: 330 kW
- HAAT: 593.9 m (1,948 ft)
- Transmitter coordinates: 47°20′32″N 97°17′21″W
- Translator(s): see § Translators

Links
- Public license information: Public file; LMS
- Website: www.valleynewslive.com

KVLY-TV (channel 11) is a television station in Fargo, North Dakota, United States, affiliated with NBC. It is owned by Gray Media alongside KXJB-LD (channel 30), a low-power CBS and CW affiliate. The two stations share studios on 21st Avenue South in Fargo; KVLY-TV's transmitter is located near Blanchard. In addition to its main studio in Fargo, KVLY-TV operates a news bureau and sales office in the US Bank building in downtown Grand Forks.

Channel 11 began broadcasting on October 11, 1959. It was built by John Boler, the owner of KXJB-TV, and served as little more than a passthrough for ABC programming in the immediate Fargo–Moorhead area. After being sold to the Polaris Corporation in 1962, the station was overhauled and turned into a full-service station with local programming. In February 1964, it began broadcasting from its current tower—which at one time was the tallest structure in the world—and changed its call sign to KTHI-TV. The expanded-coverage station supplanted the co-owned KNOX-TV in Grand Forks, but it was a distant third-place in local news ratings under Morgan Murphy Stations, which owned KTHI-TV from 1969 to 1995. In 1983, KTHI-TV became an NBC affiliate after ABC moved to the market-leading WDAY-TV and WDAZ-TV.

In 1995, Meyer Television acquired KTHI-TV, bringing it under the same umbrella as KFYR-TV in Bismarck. The station changed its call sign to KVLY-TV. Under Meyer and a procession of owners in the 1990s and early 2000s, KVLY moved from third to second place in local news. In 2003, most operations of KXJB-TV were consolidated with KVLY-TV under a local marketing agreement, culminating in the 2007 establishment of full simulcast news under the name Valley News Live. When Gray Television acquired KVLY-TV in 2014, it could not inherit the agreement to operate KXJB-TV, resulting in the CBS affiliation moving to a subchannel of KVLY and, eventually, new low-power stations.

== History ==
=== Early years (1959–1968) ===
Channel 13, not 11, was originally assigned to Fargo. This changed in December 1953 after the Federal Communications Commission (FCC) received a petition from a civic group in Bemidji, Minnesota, seeking the assignment of channel 13 there. This prompted a consortium of two local radio stations, KFGO in Fargo and KVOX in Moorhead, Minnesota, to abandon their plans for the station.

Interest was rekindled in January 1957 when the Fargo Telecasting Company, controlled by Marvin Kratter of New York, applied for channel 11. That application was followed five months later by one from the North Dakota Broadcasting Company (NDBC), controlled by John Boler. Among Boler's holdings was KXJB-TV (channel 4) in Valley City. Kratter dropped out in January 1958. Turning down an intervention from Fargo TV station WDAY-TV (channel 6), which feared the loss of some network programs to the new station and believed that channels 4 and 11 would constitute a then-illegal duopoly, an FCC hearing examiner approved the North Dakota Broadcasting Company application on May 27, 1958; the commission approved the station in 1959. NDBC announced that, although the studios would be shared with KXJB-TV's Fargo site and the recently purchased KFGO (renamed KXGO), the new station would transmit from Sabin, Minnesota, and be named KXGO-TV.

KXGO-TV began broadcasting on October 11, 1959. Its arrival triggered a minor realignment of network programming in North Dakota as its first exclusive ABC affiliate. Previously, North Dakota's three NBC affiliates—WDAY-TV, KFYR-TV in Bismarck, and KNOX-TV in Grand Forks—had aired some ABC shows. With the advent of channel 11, ABC shows were now seen from the new KXGO-TV and Boler's Bismarck station, KBMB-TV. However, some viewers lost ABC programming because the NBC affiliates reached more viewers than the new channel 11.

In 1962, Ferris Traylor of Evansville, Indiana, acquired KXGO-TV as well as KNOX-TV in Grand Forks and KCND-TV (channel 12) in Pembina. The new ownership announced major plans to shuffle the first two stations by relocating channel 11 to a new, tall tower near Hillsboro, North Dakota, and moving channel 10 completely from Grand Forks to Thief River Falls, Minnesota. The station set up new local offices in the Manchester Building in Fargo and began planning the construction of a new, 2,000-foot (610 m) television tower. At the time, the tallest tower—located in Cusseta, Georgia—was 1,749 feet (533 m) high. On May 15, 1963, to dissociate itself from KXGO radio, the station changed its call sign to KEND-TV (for "Eastern North Dakota"); that month, the new tall tower received FCC approval. This facility would make KNOX-TV redundant by including Grand Forks in the enlarged channel 11 service area. Though delayed by the discovery that Bethlehem Steel had produced defective steel for the tower and two others across the country, the structure was completed on November 8, 1963, when a 113-foot (34 m) antenna for channel 11 was affixed to the top of the 1,950-foot (590 m) mast.

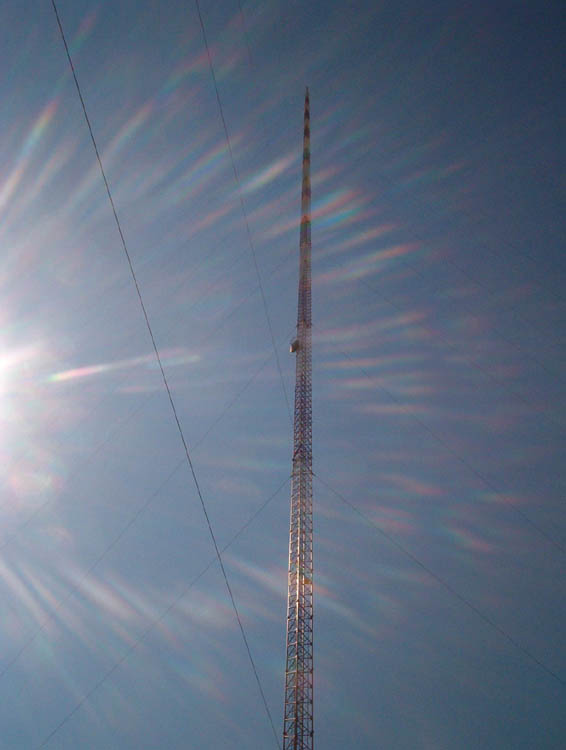
Built in 1964, the KVLY-TV mast was the world's tallest structure at completion.

When the tower was due to be activated on February 1, 1964, KEND-TV changed its call sign again to KTHI-TV (for "Tower High"); technical questions pushed back the site switch to February 8. Coinciding with the change, the station moved into new studios south of Fargo. KNOX-TV was shut down, and its studio and office in Grand Forks was absorbed into the enlarged KTHI operation.

Traylor's broadcasting interests were undergoing ownership changes even as channel 11 was acquired, as Milwaukee-based Polaris Industries acquired half of Traylor-owned Producers, Inc. in 1962 and the remainder in 1963. In 1966, Polaris merged with the Natco Corporation. It put KTHI-TV and KCND-TV on the market; despite an offer for the former by Don Burden of the Star Stations radio group, channel 11 was never sold and remained in the Natco fold post-merger. Natco's primary owner, J. B. Fuqua, renamed the firm Fuqua Industries in February 1967. During this time, in 1967, KTHI-TV moved its Grand Forks studio to larger quarters on 9th Avenue North. This came after the company considered originating half of KTHI's broadcast day from Grand Forks and the other half from Fargo.

=== Morgan Murphy ownership (1969–1995) ===
In 1969, Fuqua Industries sold KTHI-TV for $1.491 million to Spokane Television, a subsidiary of the Morgan Murphy Stations group. The FCC waived a rule requiring new owners to hold stations at least three years except in cases of financial difficulty, noting that Pembina had not been able to find a buyer in 1966 even though the sale of KTHI-TV was provided for in the merger agreement. After the sale, the station remained unprofitable for at least its first four years. Into the late 1970s, most of the station's local morning programming continued to originate from Grand Forks.

On August 22, 1983, KTHI became an NBC affiliate, swapping affiliations with WDAY-TV and its satellite for the Devils Lake and Grand Forks area, WDAZ-TV (channel 8). The switch was initiated by ABC, which at the time was number-one in the ratings seeking affiliation upgrades nationally and had courted WDAY for several years. KTHI management found out in a curt, 90-second phone call from ABC; most station employees learned their station was losing its network by way of an announcement on WDAY-TV's newscast.

Until 1986, channel 11 was carried by cable systems across Manitoba, including the Winnipeg area. It and KXJB-TV were removed when Canadian cable companies were granted permission to replace most of the North Dakota stations with network affiliates from Detroit provided via the CANCOM service, which were believed to have better picture quality.

=== Meyer and Sunrise ownership ===
Meyer Broadcasting of Bismarck, North Dakota, owner of KFYR-TV in Bismarck and its network of satellites in western North Dakota, bought the station in a deal announced in November 1994 and completed in March 1995. On June 5, the station changed its call sign to KVLY-TV, reflecting the Red River Valley region; recently relaxed FCC rules allowed an FM station in Texas to share the call sign. In 1998, Meyer opted to exit the television business. It sold all its TV stations—KVLY-TV and KFYR-TV and satellites—to Sunrise Television, a division of the private equity firm Hicks, Muse, Tate & Furst, for $63.75 million.

=== Consolidation with KXJB ===
In 2002, North Dakota Television LLC—a consortium of private equity firms The Wicks Group of Companies, JP Morgan Partners, and Halyard Capital—acquired KVLY-TV and KFYR-TV. The next year, the station acquired the non-license assets of KXJB from Catamount Broadcasting. Under a local marketing agreement (LMA), KVLY began to provide most operating functions beyond programming for KXJB. The KVLY studios on 21st Avenue South were expanded to house an additional studio for KXJB. Hoak Media of Dallas acquired KVLY-TV and KFYR-TV, as well as KSFY-TV in Sioux Falls, South Dakota, and its satellites in 2006.

On November 20, 2013, Hoak announced the sale of most of its stations, including KVLY-TV, to Gray Television. Simultaneously, KXJB-TV was to be sold by Parker Broadcasting to Excalibur Broadcasting and would have continued to be operated by KVLY under an LMA. The sale was completed on June 13, but upon the closing of the sale, and in the wake of the new FCC rules restricting LMAs, Excalibur abandoned its plans to acquire the station. Instead, Gray began seeking an independent, minority-owned buyer for the KXJB facility and made plans to move KXJB's CBS programming to a subchannel of KVLY-TV. This took place on November 12, 2014, as KXJB was sold to Major Market Broadcasting. The KXJB facility was turned off on December 1, 2014. To supplement the main transmitter for CBS service, Gray acquired three low-power stations, at Horace, Argusville, and Grand Forks, in 2015. The Horace transmitter became KXJB-LD, bringing the call sign back to use after Gray temporarily parked it on a facility in Wyoming.

== Local programming ==
=== News operation ===
Valley News Live logo

The original KXGO-TV had no local programming or studios, relying nearly exclusively on network material from ABC. This changed in February 1964, when the station became KTHI-TV and began airing local newscasts. One of the first on-air personalities was former professional football player Steve Myhra as a sportscaster. When Morgan Murphy bought channel 11 in 1969, the news department was reorganized with the main early evening newscast at 5 p.m. After canceling it, the station reinstated an early newscast at 5:30 in 1977, which moved back to 5 p.m. by 1981. While KTHI attracted a reasonable audience uncontested at 5 p.m., when fewer households watched TV, its 10 p.m. news—head-to-head with WDAY–WDAZ and KXJB—was a distant third at that time, watched by just 7 percent of viewers. Such advancements as a co-anchor format as well as Grand Forks stories introduced live by an anchor in Grand Forks were later discontinued to simplify the newscast. The station returned to a co-anchor format in 1987 and later that year introduced its first morning newscast.

In 1989, KTHI hired Charley Johnson, the 14-year news director and anchor at KXJB, to anchor its newscasts, including a 6 p.m. edition to go head-to-head with the other local stations. The new newscast was added in part, per general manager John Hrubesky, to beat a misconception national advertisers had about the Midwest, that few people were watching TV at 5 p.m. because they were on the farm. It was the first time a local station had produced three full evening newscasts; in 1979, KXJB had briefly shared a 5 p.m. newscast with the KX Network stations in western North Dakota. The ratings did not immediately improve; at 10 p.m., KTHI had an audience share of 7 percent, roughly half that of KXJB and a quarter that of WDAY–WDAZ. The morning newscast, 15 minutes in length since its 1987 debut, was lengthened to a full half-hour in 1993.

Upon the Meyer acquisition of KTHI, the company dismissed lead news anchor Doug Hamilton. By 1996, the station was narrowly behind KXJB at 6 p.m. and ahead of it at 10 p.m., and it was ahead of KXJB in both time periods by 2000. KXJB's condition worsened over the ensuing years. When KVLY took over most of KXJB's operations in 2003, the latter station's early evening newscast times and format were changed to not conflict with KVLY. Except for a noon newscast, which KVLY did not offer, there was initially little overlap in on-air presenters. That changed in November 2007, when the stations' previously separate weeknight 10 p.m. newscasts and news brands were combined under the name Valley News Live. The stations had already been airing a combined weekend newscast.

Over the course of the 2010s, Valley News Live became increasingly competitive with WDAY. In May 2013, while WDAY maintained a lead on total households, Valley News Live accounted for more viewership in key demographics favored by advertisers. In 2014, KVLY surpassed WDAY as the ratings leader in Fargo–Moorhead proper, though the combination of WDAY and WDAZ remained number-one in the full designated market area.

As of September 2024, Valley News Live produced a combined 39 hours a week of local news programming across the NBC, CBS, and CW subchannels.

=== Sports programming ===
KVLY has at times been home to North Dakota State Bison football games. The station broadcast regular-season games and produced a pregame show. In the 2019–2020 season, the pregame show featured former NFL player and Bison alum Kyle Emanuel as one of the hosts. NDSU games moved to WDAY-TV in 2021 after Forum Communications won the rights.

== Former on-air staff ==
- Dennis Bounds – news anchor, 1976–1978
- Bob Ivers – news anchor and talk-show host, 1970–1972
- Jim Lounsbury – news director and anchor, 1980
- Ed Schultz – sports director, 1980–1983

== Technical information ==
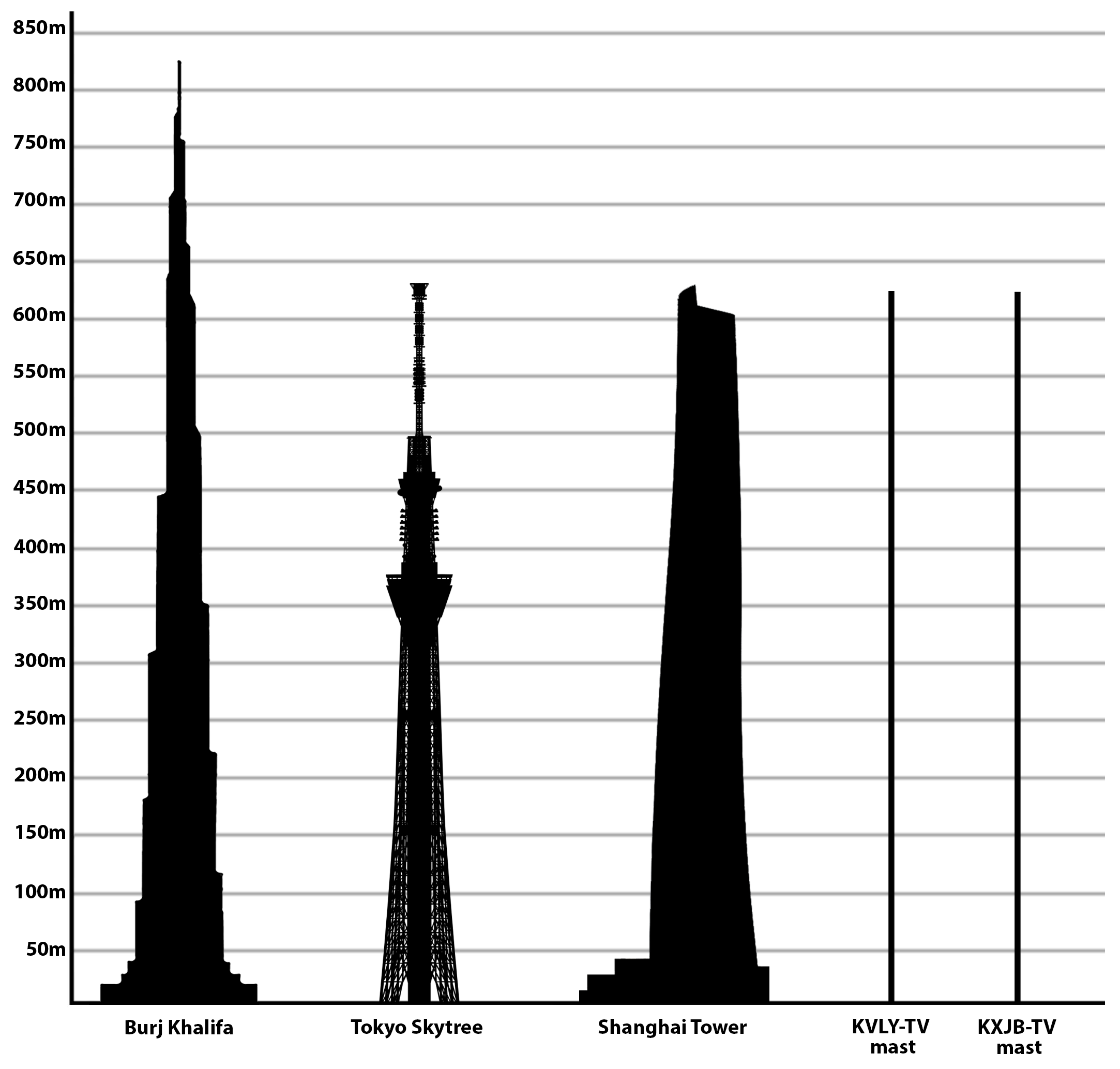
Comparison of the KVLY-TV mast to the tallest structures in the world

=== Subchannels ===
The station's signal is multiplexed:

Subchannels of KVLY-TV
Subchannel	Res.	Short name	Programming
11.1	1080i	KVLYNBC	NBC
11.2	720p	KX4CBS	CBS (KXJB-LD)
11.3	480i	MeTV	MeTV
11.4	480i	The365	365BLK

Simulcast of subchannels of another station

=== Analog-to-digital conversion ===
KVLY-TV shut down its analog signal, over VHF channel 11, on February 16, 2009, the day prior to the original digital television transition date. The station's digital signal remained on its pre-transition UHF channel 44 where it remained until being repacked to channel 36 on May 28, 2019.

=== Tower ===
Since February 8, 1964, channel 11 has been broadcast from a tall tower near Blanchard. The tower—erected in 1963 by the Kline Iron and Steel Company of Columbia, South Carolina—made the former KNOX-TV in Grand Forks redundant and vastly increased the station's coverage area. It was the tallest man-made structure at its completion, surpassed by the Warsaw radio mast in Poland from 1974 to its 1991 collapse and then again by the Burj Khalifa in Dubai in 2008. In 2019, the VHF antenna at the top of the mast was removed, reducing its height to 1,987 feet (606 m).

=== Translators ===
KVLY-TV serves portions of its large coverage area with three translators. All are in Minnesota and owned by local municipalities.

- Baudette: K14PH-D
- Roseau: K21NF-D
- Baudette: K34MC-D

== See also ==
- KVLY-TV mast
