= List of Laff affiliates =

The following is a list of affiliates for Laff, a digital subchannel network owned by the Scripps Networks division of the E. W. Scripps Company.

== Affiliates ==
List of Laff affiliates
Media market	State/District	Station	Channel
Birmingham	Alabama	WBRC	6.4
Dothan	Alabama	WDHN	18.3
Huntsville	Alabama	WAFF	48.4
Mobile	Alabama	WALA-TV	10.3
Montgomery	Alabama	WALE-LD	17.2
Anchorage	Alaska	KDMD	33.5
Phoenix	Arizona	KNXV-TV	15.3
Tucson	Arizona	KGUN-TV	9.2
Yuma	Arizona	KBFY-LD	41.3
Fayetteville	Arkansas	KNWA-TV	51.3
Little Rock	Arkansas	KARK-TV	4.2
Bakersfield	California	KGET-TV	17.4
Fresno	California	KGMC	43.9
Los Angeles	California	KPXN-TV	30.4
Monterey–Salinas	California	KMMD-CD	39.6
Palm Springs	California	KVER-CD	41.4
Sacramento	California	KXTV	10.4
San Francisco	California	KKPX-TV	65.5
San Diego	California	KFMB	8.3
Santa Barbara	California	KSBY	6.3
Colorado Springs	Colorado	KOAA-TV	5.8
Denver	Colorado	KMGH-TV	7.3
Grand Junction	Colorado	KREX-TV	5.2
Hartford	Connecticut	WFSB	3.3
Washington	District of Columbia	WPXW-TV	66.4
Fort Myers	Florida	WGPS-LD	22.5
Jacksonville	Florida	WKBJ-LD	20.3
Jacksonville	Florida	WPXC-TV	21.6
Orlando	Florida	WFTV	9.2
Panama City	Florida	WMBB	13.3
Sarasota	Florida	WSNN-LD	39.3
Tampa	Florida	WFTS-TV	28.2
West Palm Beach	Florida	WPTV-TV	5.3
Albany	Georgia	WSST-TV	55.6
Atlanta	Georgia	WPXA-TV	14.3
Augusta	Georgia	WGAT-LD	28.1
Columbus	Georgia	WRBL	3.4
Macon	Georgia	WMGT-TV	41.5
Rome	Georgia	WKSY-LD	21.3
Savannah	Georgia	WSAV-TV	3.4
Honolulu	Hawaii	KIKU	20.3
Boise	Idaho	KIVI-TV	6.2
Twin Falls	Idaho	KSAW-LD	6.2
Chicago	Illinois	WCPX-DT	38.4
Peoria	Illinois	WMBD-TV	31.3
Rockford	Illinois	WTVO	17.3
Springfield–Champaign	Illinois	WCIX	49.4
Evansville	Indiana	WEHT	25.2
Fort Wayne	Indiana	WANE-TV	15.3
Indianapolis	Indiana	WRTV	6.3
South Bend	Indiana	WHME-TV	46.4
Terre Haute	Indiana	WTWO	2.3
Cedar Rapids	Iowa	KPXR-TV	48.4
Davenport	Iowa	KGCW	26.3
Des Moines	Iowa	WOI-DT	5.2
Sioux City	Iowa	KCAU-TV	9.4
Topeka	Kansas	KTMJ-CD	43.4
Wichita	Kansas	KDCU-DT	31.4
Bowling Green	Kentucky	WNKY-LD	35.3
Lexington	Kentucky	WUPX-TV	67.4
Louisville	Kentucky	WMYO-CD	24.1
Paducah	Kentucky	W29CI-D	29.3
Alexandria	Louisiana	WNTZ-TV	48.4
Baton Rouge	Louisiana	WVLA-TV	33.2
Lafayette	Louisiana	KLFY-TV	10.4
Lake Charles	Louisiana	KSWL-LD	17.4
Monroe	Louisiana	KTVE	10.3
New Orleans	Louisiana	KGLA-DT	42.2
Shreveport	Louisiana	KTAL-TV	6.2
Portland	Maine	WMTW	8.3
Baltimore	Maryland	WMJF-CD	39.4
Hagerstown	Maryland	WDVM-TV	25.4
Salisbury	Maryland	WGDV-LD	32.6
Boston	Massachusetts	WFXT	25.3
Detroit	Michigan	WXYZ-TV	7.3
Grand Rapids	Michigan	WZPX-TV	43.4
Marquette	Michigan	WJMN-TV	3.3
Saginaw	Michigan	WAQP	49.4
Traverse City–Cadillac	Michigan	WWTV	9.4
Traverse City–Cadillac	Michigan	WFUP	45.4
Alexandria	Minnesota	K21GN-D	21.5
Duluth	Minnesota	KDLH	3.3
Frost	Minnesota	K35IU-D	18.1
Granite Falls	Minnesota	K31PG-D	18.1
Jackson	Minnesota	K35IZ-D	18.1
Mankato	Minnesota	K19LI-D	19.1
Minneapolis–St. Paul	Minnesota	KWJM-LD	15.2
Redwood Falls	Minnesota	K16MV-D	16.5
Rochester	Minnesota	KXLT-TV	47.7
Biloxi–Gulfport	Mississippi	WXVO-LD	7.4
Greenwood	Mississippi	WHCQ-LD	8.6
Jackson	Mississippi	WLBT	3.4
Columbia–Jefferson City	Missouri	KQFX-LD	22.2
Joplin	Missouri	KSNF	16.2
Kansas City	Missouri	KSHB-TV	41.3
St. Joseph	Missouri	KNPN-LD	26.5
St. Louis	Missouri	KMOV	4.4
St. Louis	Missouri	WRBU	46.4
Springfield	Missouri	KOLR	10.2
Billings	Montana	KHMT	4.3
Glasgow	Montana	K16AZ-D	16.4
Lincoln	Nebraska	KLKN	8.4
Omaha	Nebraska	KMTV-TV	3.2
Las Vegas	Nevada	KTNV-TV	13.2
Reno	Nevada	KREN-TV	27.4
Albuquerque–Santa Fe	New Mexico	KWBQ	19.3
Albany	New York	WYPX-TV	55.4
Binghamton	New York	WIVT	34.3
Buffalo	New York	WPXJ-TV	51.4
Elmira	New York	WETM-TV	18.3
New York City	New York	WJLP	33.2
New York City	New York	WPXN-TV	31.5
Rochester	New York	WROC-TV	8.3
Syracuse	New York	WSYR-TV	9.4
Utica	New York	WFXV	33.3
Watertown	New York	WWTI	50.3
Charlotte	North Carolina	WAXN-TV	64.4
Greensboro–Winston-Salem	North Carolina	WGPX-TV	16.4
Greenville–New Bern	North Carolina	WEPX-TV	38.4
Greenville–New Bern	North Carolina	WPXU-TV	35.4
Raleigh–Durham	North Carolina	WUVC-DT	40.5
Wilmington	North Carolina	WECT	6.4
Bismarck	North Dakota	KXMB-TV	12.3
Dickinson	North Dakota	KXMA-TV	2.3
Fargo–Valley City	North Dakota	KRDK-TV	4.6
Minot	North Dakota	KXMC-TV	13.3
Williston	North Dakota	KXMD-TV	12.3
Cincinnati	Ohio	WCPO-TV	9.5
Cleveland	Ohio	WEWS-TV	5.3
Columbus	Ohio	WCMH-TV	4.4
Dayton	Ohio	WHIO-TV	7.3
Youngstown	Ohio	WYFX-LD	62.5
Oklahoma City	Oklahoma	KSBI	52.3
Tulsa	Oklahoma	KJRH-TV	2.3
Bend	Oregon	KFXO-CD	39.5
Portland	Oregon	KPTV	12.3
Altoona-Johnstown	Pennsylvania	WTAJ-TV	10.3
Erie	Pennsylvania	WJET-TV	24.2
Harrisburg	Pennsylvania	WHTM-TV	27.4
Philadelphia	Pennsylvania	WPPX-TV	61.3
Pittsburgh	Pennsylvania	WPXI	11.3
Wilkes-Barre	Pennsylvania	WBRE-TV	28.2
Providence	Rhode Island	WPXQ-TV	69.2
Charleston	South Carolina	WCBD-TV	2.4
Columbia	South Carolina	WKTC	63.4
Greenville-Spartanburg	South Carolina	WDKT-LD	31.2
Myrtle Beach	South Carolina	WMBF-TV	32.4
Chattanooga	Tennessee	WYHB-CD	39.2
Jackson	Tennessee	WJKT	16.3
Johnson City–Kingsport	Tennessee	WKPT-TV	19.3
Knoxville	Tennessee	WATE-TV	6.3
Memphis	Tennessee	WATN-TV	24.2
Nashville	Tennessee	WNPX-TV	5.3
Abilene	Texas	KRBC-TV	9.3
Amarillo	Texas	KAMR-TV	4.3
Austin	Texas	KNVA	54.3
Corpus Christi	Texas	KORO	28.3
Dallas	Texas	KPXD-TV	68.4
El Paso	Texas	KTSM-TV	9.4
Harlingen	Texas	KCWT-CD	21.3
Houston	Texas	KPXB-TV	49.5
Laredo	Texas	KXOF-CD	31.3
Lubbock	Texas	KCBD	11.5
Midland–Odessa	Texas	KMID	2.2
San Angelo	Texas	KSAN-TV	3.3
San Antonio	Texas	KNIC-DT	17.4
Tyler	Texas	KFXK-TV	51.4
Waco	Texas	KYLE-TV	28.4
Wichita Falls	Texas	KFDX-TV	3.3
Salt Lake City	Utah	KTVX	4.3
Burlington	Vermont	WVNY	22.2
Charlottesville	Virginia	WUDJ-LD	31.5
Norfolk	Virginia	WPXV-TV	49.2
Richmond	Virginia	WRIC-TV	8.4
Richmond	Virginia	WUPV	65.4
Roanoke–Lynchburg	Virginia	WWCW	21.3
Seattle	Washington	KIRO-TV	7.3
Spokane	Washington	KSKN	22.2
Bluefield	West Virginia	WLFB	40.6
Clarksburg	West Virginia	WBOY-TV	12.4
Huntington–Charleston	West Virginia	WLPX-TV	13.3
Eau Claire–La Crosse	Wisconsin	WLAX	25.3
Green Bay	Wisconsin	WACY-TV	32.2
Madison	Wisconsin	WIFS	57.5
Milwaukee	Wisconsin	WTMJ-TV	4.6
Wausau–Rhinelander	Wisconsin	WTPX-TV	46.4
