= CBS 12 =

CBS 12 may refer to one of the following television stations in the United States:

== Current affiliates ==
- KCCW-TV in Walker, Minnesota, owned and operated by the CBS network
  - Satellite of WCCO-TV in Minneapolis/Saint Paul, Minnesota
- KEYC-TV in Mankato, Minnesota
- KEYT-DT2, a digital channel of KEYT-TV in Santa Barbara, California (cable channel, branded as NewsChannel 12 and broadcasts on 3.2)
- KFVS-TV in Cape Girardeau, Missouri
- KHSL-TV in Chico–Redding, California
- KSLA in Shreveport, Louisiana
- KWCH-DT in Wichita, Kansas
- KXII in Sherman, Texas
- WBNG-TV in Binghamton, New York
- WDEF-TV in Chattanooga, Tennessee
- WKRC-TV in Cincinnati, Ohio
- WPEC in West Palm Beach, Florida, which operates the cbs12.com website
- WPRI-TV in Providence, Rhode Island
- WRDW-TV in Augusta, Georgia

== Formerly affiliated ==
- KCOY-TV in Santa Maria–Santa Barbara–San Luis Obispo, California (1969–2021)
- KFSN-TV in Fresno, California (1956–1961)
- KTXS-TV in Sweetwater–Abilene, Texas (1956–1979)
- KUSG-TV in St. George, Utah (1999–2008)
  - Was a satellite of KUTV in Salt Lake City, Utah
- KVIH-TV in Clovis, New Mexico (1956–1979)
  - Was a satellite of KFDA-TV in Amarillo, Texas
- KXMB-TV in Bismarck, North Dakota (1953–2026)
  - Part of the KX Television Network
- WISN-TV in Milwaukee, Wisconsin (1961–1977)
- WJTV in Jackson, Mississippi (1955–2026)
- WRVA-TV (now WWBT) in Richmond, Virginia (1956–1960)
