= CW11 =

CW11 may refer to:

== U.S. television stations affiliated with The CW ==
=== Current ===
- KPLR-TV in St. Louis, Missouri (O&O)
- KTVL-DT2 in Medford, Oregon
- KXMD-TV in Williston, North Dakota
  - Part of the KX Television Network
- WBNG-TV-DT2 in Binghamton, New York
- WPIX in New York, New York (now known on air as "PIX 11")

=== Former ===
- KSTW in Seattle–Tacoma, Washington (2006–2023)

== Other Use ==
- CW11, a postcode district in the CW postcode area
