= CBS 11 =

CBS 11 may refer to one of the following television stations in the United States:

== Currently affiliated ==
- KCBY-TV in Coos Bay, Oregon
  - Re-broadcast of KVAL-TV in Eugene, Oregon
- KELO-TV in Sioux Falls, South Dakota
- KGIN in Grand Island, Nebraska
  - Re-broadcast of KOLN in Lincoln, Nebraska
- KHOU in Houston, Texas
- KKTV in Colorado Springs, Colorado
- KMVT in Twin Falls, Idaho
- KTVT in Dallas–Fort Worth, Texas (O&O)
- KTHV in Little Rock, Arkansas
- KUAM-DT2 in Hagåtña, Guam (cable channel; broadcasts on channel 8.2)
- KVLY-DT2 in Fargo, North Dakota
- WBKB-TV in Alpena, Michigan
- WINK-TV in Fort Myers, Florida
- WJHL-TV in Johnson City, Tennessee
- WTOC-TV in Savannah, Georgia
- WTOL in Toledo, Ohio

== Formerly affiliated ==
- KSTW in Seattle/Tacoma, Washington (1953–1958, 1960–1962 and 1995–1997)
- KTTV in Los Angeles, California (1949–1951)
- KTVA in Anchorage, Alaska (1953–2020)
- KTVF in Fairbanks, Alaska (1955–1996)
- KXMD-TV in Williston, North Dakota (1969–2026)
  - Part of the KX Television Network
- KUAM-LP in Hagåtña, Guam (cable channel; was on channel 20 from 1995– 2013)
- WBAL-TV in Baltimore, Maryland (1981–1995)
- WHAS-TV in Louisville, Kentucky (1950–1990)
- WTVD in Raleigh/Durham, North Carolina (1957–1985)
