= CBS 14 =

CBS 14 may refer to one of the following television stations in the United States:

== Current ==
- KGWC-TV in Casper, Wyoming
- KMCY-DT2 in Minot, North Dakota
- KVIQ-LD in Eureka, California

== Former ==
- KMEG in Sioux City, Iowa (1967–2021)
