= KXMA-TV =

Television station in Dickinson, North Dakota

Semi-satellite of KXMB-TV, Bismarck, North Dakota
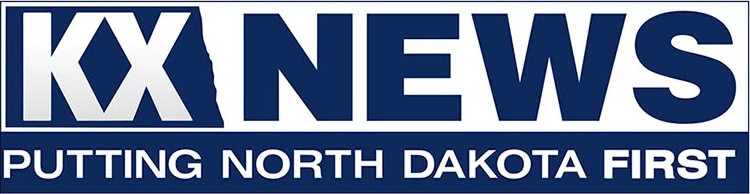

- Dickinson, North Dakota; United States
- Channels: Digital: 19 (UHF); Virtual: 2
- Branding: KX Television; Dakota's CW; KX News

Programming
- Network: KX Television
- Affiliations: 2.1: The CW; for others, see § Subchannels

Ownership
- Owner: Nexstar Media Group; (Nexstar Media Inc.)
- Sister stations: KXMB-TV, KXMC-TV, KXMD-TV

History
- First air date: October 15, 1956
- Former call signs: KDIX-TV (1956–1983); KNDX (1983–1985)
- Former channel numbers: Analog: 2 (VHF, 1956–2009)
- Former affiliations: CBS (1956–2016, 2.2 2016–2026); NBC (secondary, 1956–1980); ABC (secondary, 1956–1986)
- Call sign meaning: KX Television

Technical information
- Licensing authority: FCC
- Facility ID: 55684
- ERP: 150 kW
- HAAT: 217 m (712 ft)
- Transmitter coordinates: 46°43′35″N 102°54′57″W

Links
- Public license information: Public file; LMS
- Website: www.kxnet.com

KXMA-TV (channel 2) is a television station in Dickinson, North Dakota, United States, airing programming from The CW. The station is owned by Nexstar Media Group, and maintains a news bureau and advertising sales office at the intersection of West Villard Street and State Avenue North in Dickinson; its transmitter is located southwest of the city. As Dickinson is located in the Mountain Time Zone, the station's prime time schedule starts at 6 p.m. rather than the usual 7 p.m. start for the rest of Mountain Time, or in Central Time, where most of North Dakota is located.

KXMA-TV is considered a semi-satellite of KXMB-TV in Bismarck, which is the flagship station of the four-station KX Television regional network. KXMC-TV in Minot is the oldest station and former flagship of the KX group, while KXMB provides master control and some internal operations for the entire network. KXMA airs a time-shifted simulcast of KXMB in Mountain Time for most of the day, clearing all network and syndicated programming as provided through its parent. However, KXMA airs separate legal identifications and commercial inserts. The KX network relays CW network programming and other programs across central and western North Dakota, as well as bordering counties in Montana and South Dakota. KXMA serves the southwestern portion of the Bismarck–Minot market. The four stations are counted as a single unit for ratings purposes.

== History ==
Logo used by KXMA as a main CBS affiliate.

KXMA signed on in 1956 as KDIX-TV, and was owned by the Dickinson Radio and TV Corporation along with KDIX radio. Although the Federal Communications Commission (FCC) had combined all of western and central North Dakota into a single market in the mid-1950s, this would not be fully realized for another three decades, mainly because Dickinson is in the Mountain Time Zone. KDIX-TV carried programming from all three networks—CBS, NBC and ABC—but was a primary CBS affiliate.

The station was unable to get a direct network feed for its first three decades on the air. Until 1966, the station picked up what CBS programs it could under CBS' Extended Market Plan, which served as a go-between for non-interconnected stations in very small markets. It also aired a few ABC and NBC shows out of pattern.

Then, in 1966, KOTA-TV in Rapid City planned to sign on KHSD-TV (channel 11), a satellite station in Lead, South Dakota, to extend its coverage into northeastern Wyoming and southeastern Montana. At the time, KOTA-TV held a joint affiliation with CBS and ABC, but slightly favored CBS. Stanley Deck, KDIX's general manager at the time, discovered that Dickinson was close enough to Lead that his engineers could easily get an acceptable signal from KHSD whenever CBS and ABC programming aired. He arranged with the Duhamel family, owners of KOTA, to provide network programming for KDIX-TV. In addition, Deck purchased virtually all the stock in the Dickinson Radio and TV Corporation. The deal took effect when KHSD opened on November 2, 1966; for the next several years, KDIX was practically a separately-owned satellite of KOTA. It continued airing NBC programming even after KFYR-TV opened a low-powered translator in Dickinson around 1967.

Then, in 1970, KOTA swapped affiliations with KRSD-TV (a precursor of the present KOTA-TV) and joined NBC. KDIX-TV still picked up ABC programming from KOTA, and was also able to pick up NBC as well. However, its engineers now had to switch to KXMB's signal for CBS shows. A decade later, in 1980, KFYR-TV owner Meyer Television upgraded its Dickinson translator to a full-power station, KQCD-TV. Channel 2 then dropped all NBC programming and severed its remaining ties with KOTA-TV; afterward, KDIX-TV and the Reiten stations — KXMC-TV, KXMB-TV, and KXMD-TV — were jointly branded as the "4X Network".

In 1983, Deck sold KDIX-TV to Big Horn Communications, which owned KOUS-TV in Billings, and the calls were changed to KNDX. Big Horn paid so little attention to KNDX that the station's signal quickly deteriorated to the point of unacceptability. With the station on the verge of closing down, the Reitens came to KNDX's rescue, agreeing to buy the station in late 1984. The station adopted its current calls, KXMA-TV, when the deal closed on January 2, 1985. (It would have been KXME, but Prairie Public Television objected.) With wealthier ownership, KXMA was finally able to get a direct network feed from CBS. Since then, KXMA has been a semi-satellite of KXMB, airing a time-shifted feed of KXMB in Mountain Time. It continued to air a few ABC shows until 1986, when newly signed-on Bismarck ABC affiliate KBMY opened a translator in Dickinson.

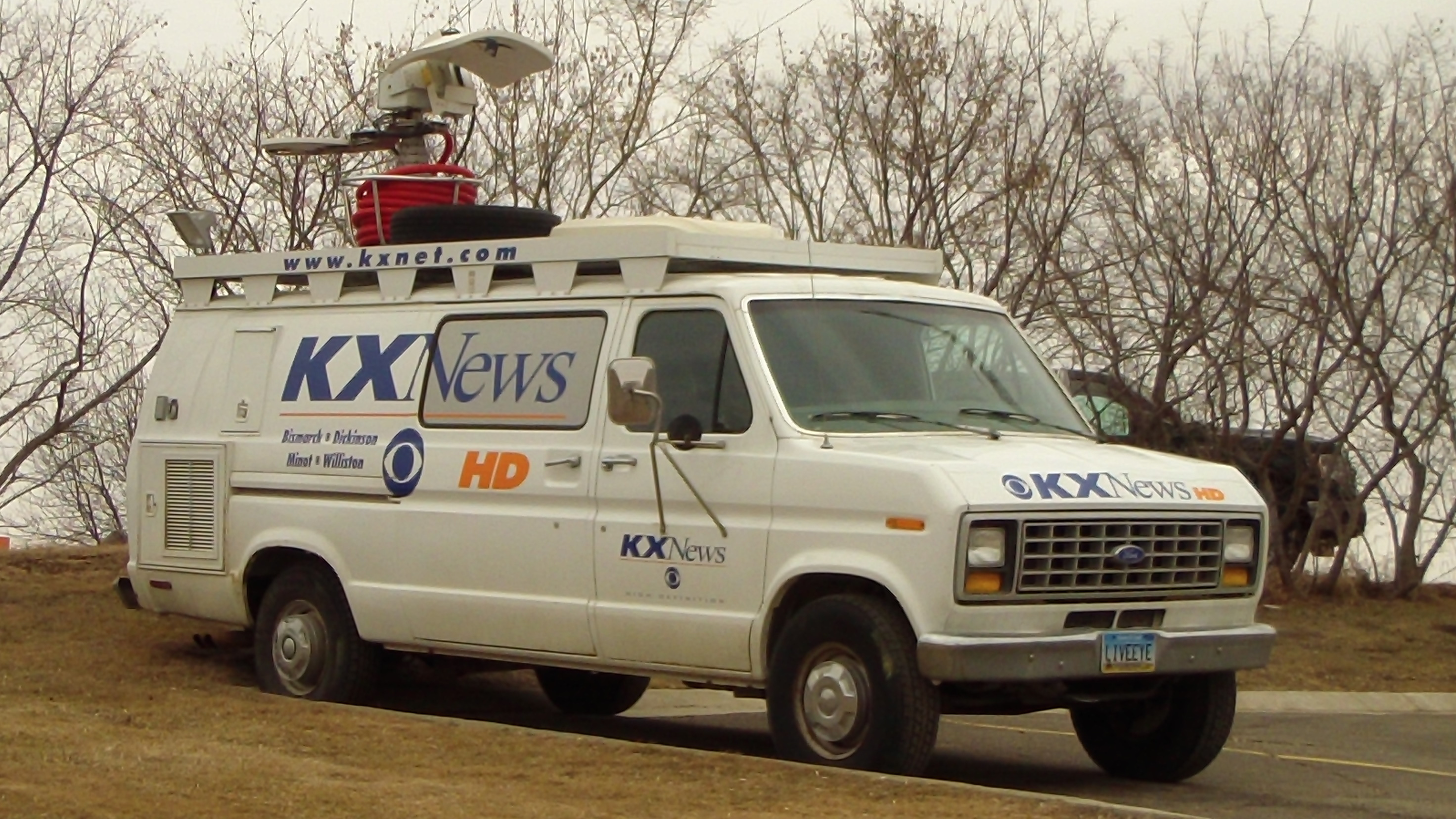
Electronic news-gathering unit supporting KXMB and sister stations

In 2006, the stations began a web portal-like website called KX Net, with each station's website displaying a localized front page. The stations continue to be branded as "KX Television" and as "KX News" on the air, but also began using the "KX Net" moniker on the air. KXNet.com combined the previous domains kxma.com, kxmb.com, kxmc.com and kxmd.com under one umbrella. The original domains are still active. KXNet.com won the 2007 Teddy Award for Best Website and the 2007 Eric Sevareid Award for best website small market television in a six state region.

In July 2008, Reiten Television began a joint agreement to sell television commercial slots on both its existing stations and KBMY, Bismarck's ABC affiliate owned by Forum Communications Company. A consequence of this agreement was that KBMY's programming began to be simulcast in Dickinson on a full-power signal on KXMA's second digital subchannel in 2009.

In October 2007, KXNet.com along with Midkota Solutions launched DakotaPolitics.com, a web site focusing on North Dakota political news coverage. DakotaPolitics featured profile information, voting records and some analysis. DakotaPolitics also launched weekly tracking polls for the 2008 elections. In 2008, KXNet.com became the first web site in North Dakota to deliver a live news broadcast over the Internet when they streamed a 1-hour special coverage of the 2008 Presidential Caucuses from Bismarck.

Nexstar Broadcasting Group announced its $44 million purchase of the Reiten Television stations, including KXMA-TV, on September 17, 2015. The sale was completed on February 2, 2016. As result of the acquisition, Nexstar decided to terminate the joint sales agreement with KBMY.

KX Television lost the CBS affiliation to KBMY and KMCY on August 1, 2026. KBMY–KMCY was one of two Forum-owned stations receiving CBS from Nexstar-owned stations in their markets.

== News operation ==
KXMB produces local newscasts on weekdays at noon, 6 and 10 p.m. Weekend newscasts are produced at 6 and 10 p.m. on Saturdays, and 10 p.m. on Sundays. KXMC produces a morning show at 5 a.m. and co-produces a 5 p.m. newscast with KXMB, broadcast on all four stations. All of the local newscasts are broadcast in high definition.

For many years, KXMA placed inserts into KXMB's newscasts. However, recent cutbacks have resulted in KXMA's operations being largely merged with those of KXMB, and local inserts have been eliminated.

On November 30, 2013, actor Will Ferrell, as a promotion for his film Anchorman 2, co-anchored the KX network's evening news as his character Ron Burgundy.

== Technical information ==
=== Subchannels ===
The station's signal is multiplexed:

Subchannels of KXMA-TV
Subchannel	Res.	Short name	Programming
2.1	1080i	KXMA-CW	The CW
2.2	720p		Antenna TV
2.3	480i	Laff	Laff
2.4	480i	MYSTERY	Ion Mystery

=== Analog-to-digital conversion ===
KXMA-TV shut down its analog signal, over VHF channel 2, on June 12, 2009, the official date on which full-power television stations in the United States transitioned from analog to digital broadcasts under federal mandate. The station's digital signal remained on its pre-transition UHF channel 19, using virtual channel 2.

== See also ==
- KXMB-TV
- KXMC-TV
- KXMD-TV
