= KBMY =

Television station in Bismarck, North Dakota

KBMY and KMCY
Semi-satellites of WDAY-TV, Fargo, North Dakota

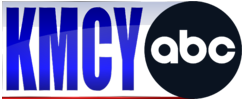

KBMY: Bismarck–Mandan, North Dakota; KMCY: Minot, North Dakota; United States
- Channels for KBMY: Digital: 17 (UHF); Virtual: 17
- Channels for KMCY: Digital: 14 (UHF); Virtual: 14
- Branding: KBMY: KBMY; WDAY News; WDAY Xtra (17.3); KMCY: KMCY; WDAY News; WDAY Xtra (14.3)

Programming
- Affiliations: 17.1/14.1: ABC; 17.2/14.2: CBS; 17.3/14.3: Independent with MyNetworkTV; for others, see § Subchannels

Ownership
- Owner: Forum Communications Company; (KBMY-KMCY, LLC)

History
- First air date: KBMY: March 31, 1985; KMCY: June 19, 1985
- Former channel number: KBMY: Analog: 17 (UHF, 1985–2009); KMCY: Analog: 14 (UHF, 1985–2009)
- Call sign meaning: KBMY: Bismarck–Mandan, disambiguation of last call letter for owner Forum's flagship station WDAY; KMCY: Magic City (nickname of Minot)

Technical information
- Licensing authority: FCC
- Facility ID: KBMY: 22121; KMCY: 22127
- ERP: KBMY: 75 kW; KMCY: 40 kW
- HAAT: KBMY: 290 m (951 ft); KMCY: 217 m (712 ft)
- Transmitter coordinates: KBMY: 46°35′15″N 100°48′21″W; KMCY: 48°3′11″N 101°23′7″W

Links
- Public license information: KBMY: Public file; LMS; KMCY: Public file; LMS

KBMY (channel 17) in Bismarck, North Dakota, and KMCY (channel 14) in Minot, North Dakota, are television stations affiliated with ABC and CBS. The two stations are owned by Forum Communications Company and serve as semi-satellites of WDAY-TV in Fargo. KBMY has a news bureau and advertising sales office on North 15th Street in Bismarck and is broadcast from a transmitter located near St. Anthony, North Dakota. KMCY has a local office on 2nd St SE in Minot and is broadcast from a transmitter near South Prairie.

KBMY and KMCY went on the air in March and June 1985, respectively, as westward extensions of WDAY-TV. Previously, there was no full-time over-the-air outlet for ABC programs in western North Dakota, making it one of the few areas of the country that still lacked full service from the Big Three networks. From 1986 to 1989, KBMY–KMCY had its own news department, producing local newscasts that were combined with content from WDAY-TV. From 2002 to 2016, other regional broadcasters—first KNDX–KXND and later KX Television—provided advertising sales services and transmission capacity in Dickinson and Williston to KBMY–KMCY. Starting in 2014, WDAY gradually rolled out its Fargo-based newscasts to KBMY-KMCY, with a statewide focus. In 2026, subchannels of KBMY and KMCY assumed the CBS affiliation for western and central North Dakota from KX Television.

== History ==
=== Early years ===
In mid-1983, the Federal Communications Commission (FCC) approved the allocation of UHF channel 17 to Bismarck, North Dakota, at the request of WDAY Inc., the owner of WDAY-TV in Fargo. WDAY-TV then filed for new stations on channel 17 at Bismarck and channel 14 at Minot. The Fargo station had only recently switched its network affiliation from NBC to ABC and wished to operate satellite stations for the Bismarck and Minot area. Potential competitors in eastern and western North Dakota objected to WDAY's proposals. Fargo competitor KTHI-TV presented petitions against WDAY-TV's broadcast license renewal and its new station applications, claiming that the co-owned The Forum of Fargo–Moorhead newspaper gave preferential placement to WDAY in its television listings. KTHI claimed that allowing Forum to build the additional stations in Bismarck and Minot would increase Forum's hold on the mass media in the Dakotas. This complaint was supported by Reiten Television, owner of KXMB-TV in Bismarck and KXMC-TV in Minot. In October 1984, FCC administrative law judge James C. McKinney rejected nearly all of their objections, except for the one pertaining to newspaper listings, and granted Forum's pending applications. This cleared the way for the Bismarck and Minot stations to be constructed. By that time, WDAY already had land options for both stations: in Bismarck near St. Anthony and in Minot on a parcel near KXMC-TV and Prairie Public Television.

KBMY signed on for the first time on March 31, 1985, and KMCY signed on for the first time on June 19, 1985. Previously, the full ABC schedule had only been available to households with cable television in these areas; KXMB-TV and KXMC-TV held secondary ABC affiliations but carried little ABC programming apart from Monday Night Football. The call signs for KBMY and KMCY were in keeping with other Forum stations, such as KSFY-TV and satellites, in containing two letters for the city and a Y at the end.

Initially, KBMY offered limited news service. A reporter in Bismarck contributed stories to WDAY-TV's newscasts. In August 1986, KBMY began producing a 10 p.m. local news program, presented from Bismarck by former KFYR-TV anchor Dewey Heggen, which was combined with the weather and sports segments presented from Fargo. With limited resources, KBMY news concentrated on fewer, more in-depth stories. The news department was discontinued on March 9, 1989, due to concerns about costs; a new reporter was to have moved from California before the shutdown. The nationally syndicated USA Today: The Television Show took over the newscast's former timeslot in KBMY/KMCY's schedule.

=== Operation under LMA ===
Former logo as "ABC West"

In the 2000s and 2010s, KBMY–KMCY (known as ABC West) were operated by other local broadcasters under two different local marketing agreements. In 2002, Prime Cities Broadcasting, owner of Fox affiliate KNDX–KXND, took over sales and master control services for the ABC stations, and ABC West began to be broadcast in Dickinson and Williston. In 2008, advertising sales duties for KBMY–KMCY were taken over by Reiten Television, owner of KXMB–KXMC, in a new joint sales agreement. Reiten and Forum already had an agreement to share news stories. Reiten sold the KX stations to Nexstar Broadcasting Group in 2015, and the agreement was ended, including the broadcast of KBMY–KMCY over digital subchannels of the KX stations in Dickinson (KXMA-TV) and Williston (KXMD-TV).

=== News expansion from Fargo and CBS affiliation ===
Starting in 2014, WDAY-TV began reorienting its newscasts to a statewide focus and gradually began simulcasting them on KBMY/KMCY. The Sunday 5:30 p.m. (Central Time) newscast was the first rolled out to Bismarck, in February 2014. A Saturday morning newscast debuted in 2015. By 2020, KBMY–KMCY was simulcasting all newscasts from WDAY.

Subchannels of KBMY and KMCY assumed the CBS affiliation for western and central North Dakota from longtime affiliate KX Television on August 1, 2026. KBMY–KMCY was one of two Forum-owned stations that received CBS from Nexstar Media Group–owned stations in their markets, along with sister station KNBN in Rapid City, South Dakota. The content-sharing alliance between WDAY-TV and KX Television was dissolved at the same time.

== Technical information ==
=== Subchannels ===
KBMY is broadcast from a transmitter located near St. Anthony, North Dakota. KMCY is broadcast from a transmitter near South Prairie. The stations' signals are multiplexed:

Subchannels of KBMY and KMCY
Subchannel		Res.	Short name		Programming
KBMY	KMCY	Res.	KBMY	KMCY	Programming
17.1	14.1	720p	KBMYABC	KMCYABC	ABC
17.2	14.2	1080i	KBMYCBS	KMCYCBS	CBS
17.3	14.3	720p	XTRA		WDAY Xtra (Independent) with MyNetworkTV
17.4	14.4	480i	Crime		True Crime Network

=== Analog-to-digital conversion ===
KBMY shut down its analog signal, over UHF channel 17, on June 12, 2009, the official digital television transition date. It followed the lead of KXMB in maintaining analog service to the end. While KBMY had received channel 16 for digital operations, in 2008 it requested to use channel 17 so it could use its existing analog antenna at St. Anthony and a transmitter provided by another station. KMCY shut down its analog signal by February 17, 2009.
