= KXMC-TV =

Television station in Minot, North Dakota

Semi-satellite of KXMB-TV, Bismarck, North Dakota
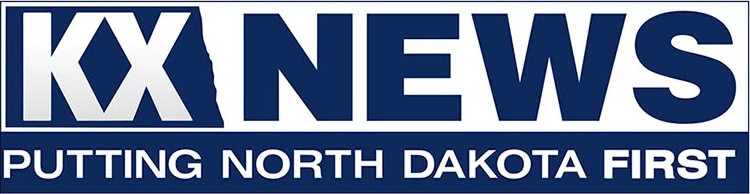

- Minot, North Dakota; United States
- Channels: Digital: 13 (VHF); Virtual: 13
- Branding: KX Television; Dakota's CW; KX News

Programming
- Network: KX Television
- Affiliations: 13.1: The CW; for others, see § Subchannels

Ownership
- Owner: Nexstar Media Group; (Nexstar Media Inc.)
- Sister stations: KXMB-TV, KXMA-TV, KXMD-TV

History
- First air date: April 4, 1953
- Former call signs: KCJB-TV (1953–1958)
- Former channel numbers: Analog: 13 (VHF, 1953–2009); Digital: 45 (UHF, 2003–2009)
- Former affiliations: CBS (1953–2026); ABC (secondary, 1953–1986)
- Call sign meaning: KX Television Magic City

Technical information
- Licensing authority: FCC
- Facility ID: 55685
- ERP: 16.1 kW
- HAAT: 334 m (1,096 ft)
- Transmitter coordinates: 48°3′0″N 101°23′32″W

Links
- Public license information: Public file; LMS
- Website: www.kxnet.com

KXMC-TV (channel 13) is a television station in Minot, North Dakota, United States, airing programming from The CW. The station is owned by Nexstar Media Group, and maintains studios on 2nd Street and 18th Avenue SE in Minot; its transmitter is located near South Prairie.

KXMC-TV is the oldest station and served as the flagship of the KX Television regional network until the 2000s, when master control and internal operations were moved to the studios of KXMB-TV (channel 12) on North 15th Street in Bismarck. While being one of two full-fledged stations of the KX network, KXMC is actually considered a semi-satellite of KXMB. It clears all network and syndicated programming as provided through its parent but airs separate local newscasts, local identifications, and commercial inserts. KXMD-TV (channel 11) in Williston simulcasts KXMC while KXMA-TV (channel 2) in Dickinson simulcasts KXMB. The four stations are counted as a single unit for ratings purposes. Dish Network only provides KXMC, while DirecTV only provides KXMB, as central and western North Dakota's CW station.

The over-the-air signal of KXMC reaches portions of the Canadian provinces of Saskatchewan and Manitoba.

== History ==
KXMC was the first television station in North Dakota, going on the air in April 1953 as KCJB-TV, sister station to KCJB (910 AM). Minot businessman Chester Reiten and Fargo businessman John Boler, owners of KBMB-TV in Bismarck (now KXMB-TV), bought the station in 1958 and changed KCJB's call letters to the current KXMC-TV.

Boler sold his interest in the KX stations to Reiten in 1971. Reiten retired in the 1990s and turned over his interest to his five children: Steve Reiten, Dave Reiten, Kathleen Reiten Hruby, Tim Reiten, and Melanie Reiten Shonkwiler. Tim served as company president.

The KX stations formerly had a secondary affiliation with ABC before full-time ABC affiliate KMCY signed on in 1986. During the late 1950s, the stations were also briefly affiliated with the NTA Film Network.

Until 1986, KXMD was carried by cable systems across neighboring Saskatchewan, even operating a sales office in Saskatoon, as did KUMV and Great Falls ABC station KFBB-TV. These arrangements ended in 1986 when the Canadian cable companies were granted permission to replace the North Dakota signals with network affiliates from Detroit and Toledo, Ohio.

KXJB-TV in Fargo was co-owned with the KX stations (though programmed separately) until Boler sold his interest in 1971. The stations still occasionally share stories. After an ice storm on April 6, 1997, caused the KXJB-TV mast to collapse, some cable systems replaced KXJB with KXMC, either temporarily or permanently, to maintain CBS service.

In 2006, the stations began a web portal-like website called KX Net, with each station's website displaying a localized front page. The stations continue to be branded as "KX Television" and as "KX News" on the air, but also use the "KX Net" moniker on the air. KXNet.com combined the previous domains kxma.com, kxmb.com, kxmc.com and kxmd.com under one umbrella. The original domains are still active. KXNet.com won the 2007 Teddy Award for Best Website and the 2007 Eric Severaid Award for best website small market television in a six-state region.

In October 2007, KXNet.com along with Midkota Solutions launched DakotaPolitics.com, a web site focusing on North Dakota political news coverage. DakotaPolitics featured profile information, voting records and some analysis. DakotaPolitics also launched weekly tracking polls for the 2008 elections. In 2008 KXNet.com became the first web site in North Dakota to deliver a live news broadcast over the Internet when they streamed a 1-hour special coverage of the 2008 Presidential Caucuses from Bismarck.

In July 2008, Reiten Television began a joint agreement to sell television commercial slots on both KXMC and KMCY, Minot's ABC affiliate owned by Forum Communications Company. KXMC houses sales and engineering personnel solely for KMCY's operations.

On June 23, 2011, then anchorman/reporter Shaun Sipma received a phone call from Minot native Josh Duhamel who was in Moscow, Russia, at the time to pledge his support when his hometown got flooded during KXMC's 24-hour flood coverage.

Nexstar Broadcasting Group announced its $44 million purchase of the Reiten Television stations, including KXMC-TV, on September 17, 2015. The sale was completed on February 2, 2016. As a result of the acquisition, Nexstar terminated the joint sales agreement with KMCY.

KX Television lost the CBS affiliation to KBMY and KMCY on August 1, 2026. KBMY–KMCY was one of two Forum-owned stations taking over CBS affiliation from Nexstar-owned stations in their markets.

== News operation ==
For many years, KXMC and KXMB produced separate daily local newscasts at noon, 6 p.m. and 10 p.m. on weekdays, 6 and 10 p.m. on Saturdays, and 10 p.m. on Sundays. However, after Nexstar bought the KX stations, KXMC's noon and weeknight newscasts, as well as all weekend newscasts, were dropped. It now places sports and weather inserts into KXMB's newscasts in those timeslots.

KXMC co-produces two newscasts with KXMB—a morning show at 6 a.m., Good Day Dakota (formerly KX News Morning) and a 5 p.m. newscast. Both are simulcast on all four stations.

KXMD simulcasts KXMC, while KXMA simulcasts KXMB. All of the local newscasts are broadcast in high definition.

For many years, KXMD placed inserts into KXMC's newscasts. However, recent cutbacks have resulted in KXMD's operations being largely merged with those of KXMC, and local inserts have been eliminated.

== Technical information ==
=== Subchannels ===
The station's signal is multiplexed:

Subchannels of KXMC-TV
| Subchannel | Res. | Short name | Programming |
|---|---|---|---|
| 13.1 | 1080i | KXMC-DT | The CW |
| 13.2 | 720p | | Antenna TV |
| 13.3 | 480i | Laff | Laff |
| 13.4 | 480i | MYSTERY | Ion Mystery |

=== Analog-to-digital conversion ===
KXMC-TV shut down its analog signal, over VHF channel 13, on June 12, 2009, the official date on which full-power stations in the United States transitioned from analog to digital broadcasts under federal mandate. The station's digital signal relocated from its pre-transition UHF channel 45 to VHF channel 13 for post-transition operations.

== See also ==
- KXMA-TV
- KXMB-TV
- KXMD-TV
