= KXMB-TV =

Television station in Bismarck, North Dakota

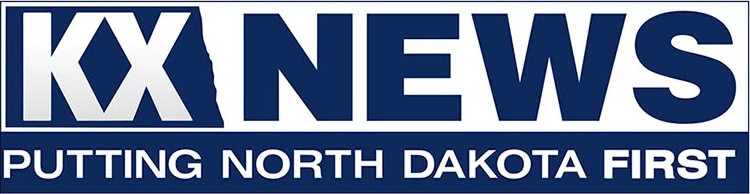

- Bismarck–Mandan, North Dakota; United States
- City: Bismarck, North Dakota
- Channels: Digital: 12 (VHF); Virtual: 12
- Branding: KX Television; Dakota's CW; KX News

Programming
- Network: KX Television
- Affiliations: 12.1: The CW; for others, see § Subchannels

Ownership
- Owner: Nexstar Media Group; (Nexstar Media Inc.)
- Sister stations: KXMA-TV, KXMC-TV, KXMD-TV

History
- First air date: November 19, 1955
- Former call signs: KBMB-TV (1955–1961)
- Former channel numbers: Analog: 12 (VHF, 1955–2009); Digital: 23 (UHF, 2002–2009)
- Former affiliations: CBS (1955–2026); ABC (secondary, 1955–1986)
- Call sign meaning: KX Television Mandan Bismarck

Technical information
- Licensing authority: FCC
- Facility ID: 55686
- ERP: 19.1 kW
- HAAT: 444.3 m (1,458 ft)
- Transmitter coordinates: 46°35′23″N 100°48′22″W

Links
- Public license information: Public file; LMS
- Website: www.kxnet.com

KXMB-TV (channel 12) is a television station in Bismarck, North Dakota, United States, airing programming from The CW. The station is owned by Nexstar Media Group, and maintains studios on North 15th Street in Bismarck; its transmitter is located near St. Anthony, North Dakota.

KXMB-TV serves as the flagship station of KX Television, a regional network of four stations relaying CW network and other programming provided by KXMB across central and western North Dakota, as well as bordering counties in Montana and South Dakota. The three satellite stations clear all network and syndicated programming as provided through KXMB but air separate legal identifications and commercial inserts. KXMC-TV (channel 13) in Minot also produces local weather and sports inserts, KXMD-TV (channel 11) in Williston simulcasts KXMC's programming, and KXMA-TV (channel 2) in Dickinson simulcasts KXMB's programming. The four stations are counted as a single unit for ratings purposes.

KXMC is the oldest station of the KX group, and was the flagship station originating programming until master control and internal operations were moved to KXMB in the 2000s. Dish Network only provides KXMC, while DirecTV only provides KXMB, as central and western North Dakota's CW station.

== History ==
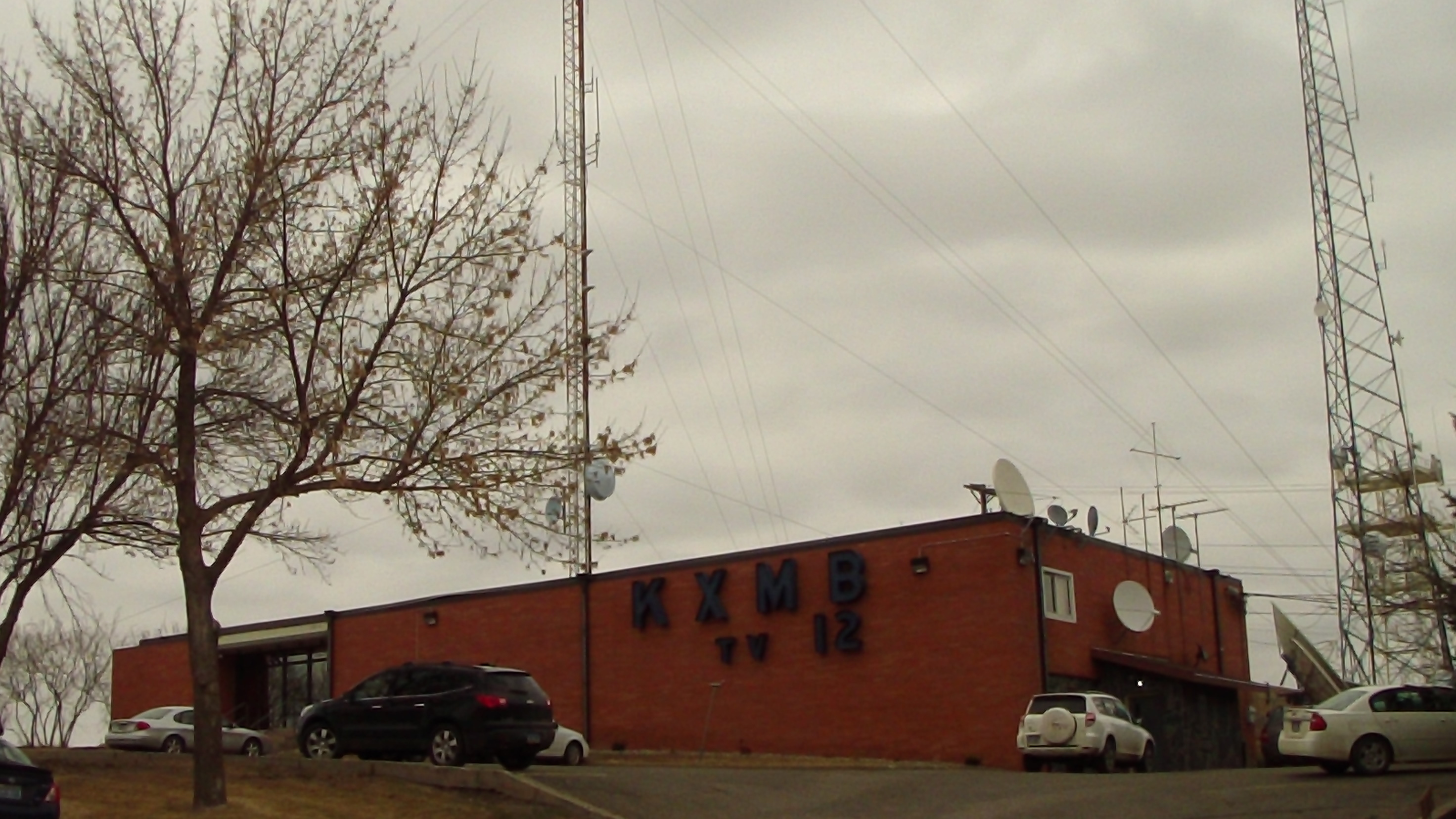
KXMB-TV studio (1958–present)

KXMB first went on the air on November 19, 1955, as KBMB-TV, owned by Fargo businessman John Boler and his North Dakota Broadcasting Company. The station had a primary affiliation with CBS, but carried other networks as well. During the late 1950s, the station was briefly affiliated with the NTA Film Network. In 1958, it moved to its current location.

In 1961, Boler sold a part-interest in the North Dakota Broadcasting Company to Chester Reiten of Minot. The two men teamed up to buy that city's CBS station, KCJB-TV, and changed the calls to KXMC-TV. The two stations merged their operations, with KXMC as the flagship station. That same year, KBMB changed its calls to the current KXMB. They would put KXMD-TV in Williston on in 1969.

This ad from TV Guide in 1973 shows the KXMB-TV news team, logo, and set as they existed at the time.

KXJB-TV in Fargo was co-owned with the KX stations (though programmed separately) until Boler sold his interest in the partnership to Reiten in 1971. Reiten retained the western North Dakota stations. The KX stations formerly had a secondary affiliation with ABC shared with KFYR-TV before full-time ABC affiliate KBMY signed on.

Reiten Broadcasting purchased KNDX (previously KDIX-TV) in Dickinson in 1985 and converted it into a full-time semi-satellite of KXMB and changed the call letters to KXMA-TV. (It would have been KXME, but Prairie Public Television objected.) Before being sister stations, KNDX/KDIX would often pick up CBS programming from KXMB since 1970, when KHSD-TV (KOTA-TV Rapid City, South Dakota satellite) dropped CBS programming.

After an ice storm on April 6, 1997, caused the KXJB-TV mast to collapse, some cable systems replaced KXJB with KXMB, either temporarily or permanently, to maintain CBS service.

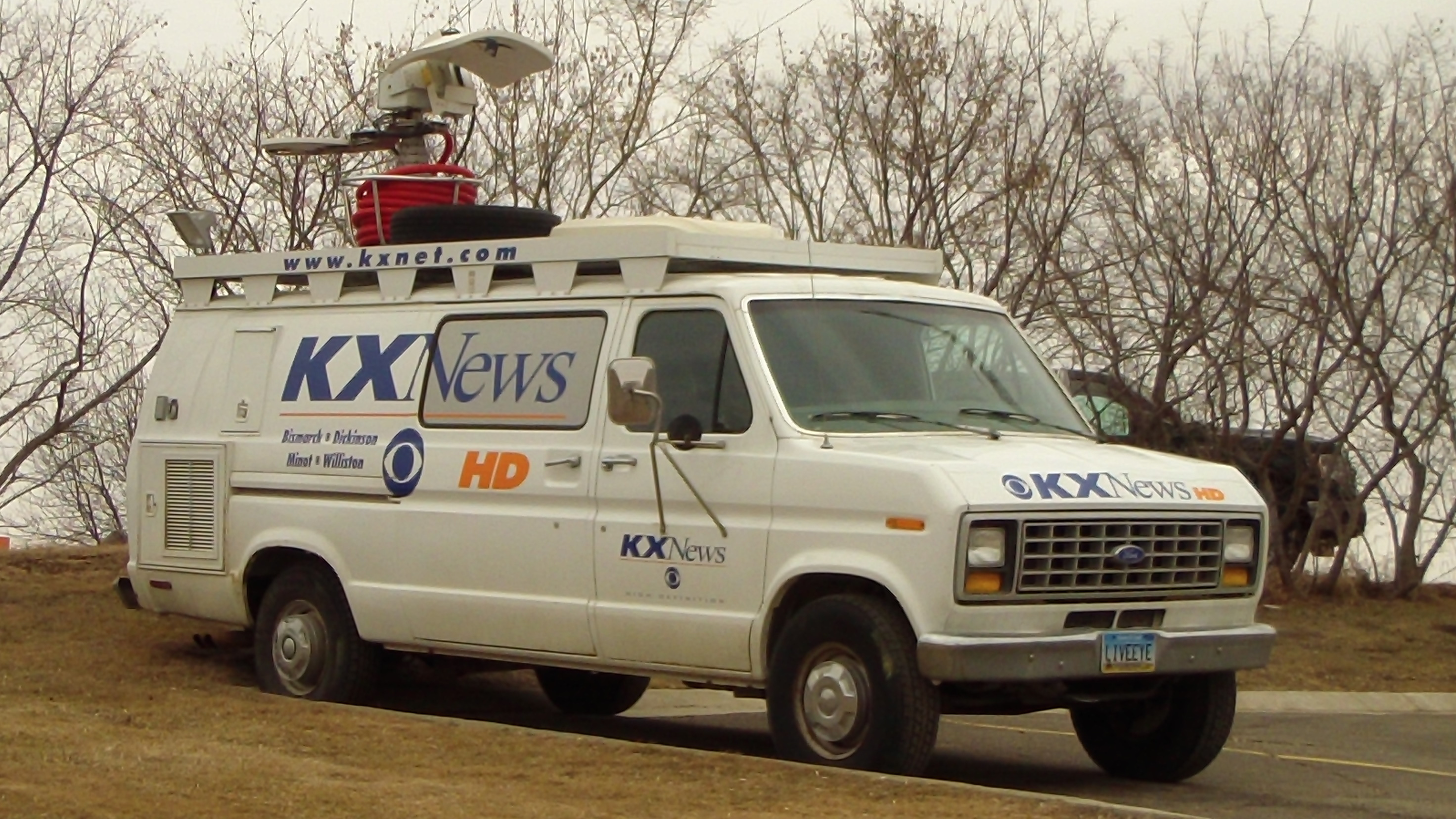
Electronic news-gathering unit supporting KXMB and sister stations

In 2006, the stations began a web portal-like website called KX Net, with each station's website displaying a localized front page. The stations continue to be branded as "KX Television" and as "KX News" on the air, but also use the "KX Net" moniker on the air. KXNet.com combined the previous domains kxma.com, kxmb.com, kxmc.com and kxmd.com under one umbrella. The original domains are still active. KXNet.com won the 2007 Teddy Award for Best Website and the 2007 Eric Sevareid Award for best website small market television in a six state region.

In July 2008, Reiten Television began a joint agreement to sell television commercial slots on both KXMB and KBMY, Bismarck's ABC affiliate owned by Forum Communications Company. KXMB houses sales and engineering personnel solely for KBMY's operations. A consequence of this agreement has enabled KBMY-DT to begin broadcasting in July 2008 directly from KXMB's station, bringing a digital ABC television signal to Bismarck.

In October 2007, KXNet.com along with Midkota Solutions launched DakotaPolitics.com, a web site focusing on North Dakota political news coverage. DakotaPolitics featured profile information, voting records and some analysis. DakotaPolitics also launched weekly tracking polls for the 2008 elections. In 2008, KXNet.com became the first web site in North Dakota to deliver a live news broadcast over the Internet when they streamed a 1-hour special coverage of the 2008 Presidential Caucuses from Bismarck.

Nexstar Broadcasting Group announced its $44 million purchase of the Reiten Television stations, including KXMB-TV, on September 17, 2015. The deal gave the Reitens a handsome return on Chester Reiten's investment of 57 years earlier. The sale was completed on February 2, 2016. As a result of the acquisition, Nexstar decided to terminate the joint sales agreement with KBMY.

KX Television lost the CBS affiliation to KBMY and KMCY on August 1, 2026. KBMY–KMCY was one of two Forum-owned stations receiving CBS from Nexstar-owned stations in their markets.

== News operation ==
KXMB produces daily local newscasts at 6 a.m., noon, 6 p.m. and 10 p.m. on weekdays, 6 and 10 p.m. on Saturdays, and 10 p.m. on Sundays. KXMC long aired separate newscasts in these timeslots as well. However, since the Nexstar purchase, its separate newscasts have been replaced with weather and sports inserts during the 6 p.m. and 10 p.m. weekday newscasts. KXMC co-produces a morning show, Good Day Dakota (formerly KX News Morning) and a 5 p.m. newscast with KXMB, broadcast on all four stations. All of the local newscasts are broadcast in high definition.

For many years, KXMA placed inserts into KXMB's newscasts. However, recent cutbacks have resulted in KXMA's operations being largely merged with those of KXMB, and local inserts have been eliminated.

On November 30, 2013, actor Will Ferrell, as a promotion for his film Anchorman 2, co-anchored the station's evening news as his character Ron Burgundy.

== Technical information ==
=== Subchannels ===
The station's signal is multiplexed:

Subchannels of KXMB-TV
Subchannel	Res.	Short name	Programming
12.1	1080i	KXMB-HD	The CW
12.2	720p		Antenna TV
12.3	480i	Laff	Laff
12.4	480i	MYSTERY	Ion Mystery

=== Analog-to-digital conversion ===
KXMB-TV was the first commercial digital television station in North Dakota as when it went on the air in 2002. The station shut down its analog signal, over VHF channel 12, at 10 a.m. on May 28, 2009. The station's digital signal relocated from its pre-transition UHF channel 23 to VHF channel 12 for post-transition operations.

=== Satellite stations ===
To reach viewers throughout the vast Minot–Bismarck–Dickinson–Williston television market, KXMB extends its over-the-air coverage area through a network of three full-power stations encompassing much of the western and central two-thirds of North Dakota and parts of eastern Montana and northwestern South Dakota, branded as KX Television.

These stations mostly rebroadcast KXMB, although they rebroadcast KXMC before the 2000s. However, their full-power licenses allow them to broadcast separate station identifications and local commercial inserts, as well as different programming if desired. KXMC maintains a separate studio facility, which houses its Minot newsroom and sales office, and produces separate local newscasts that air nightly on KXMC and simulcast on KXMD. KXMA simulcasts KXMB's newscasts.

Station	City of license	RF channel	Virtual channel	First air date	Notes	ERP (Digital)	HAAT (Digital)	Facility ID	Transmitter coordinates
KXMA-TV	Dickinson	19 (UHF)	2	October 15, 1956	simulcasts KXMB-TV	150 kW	217 m (712 ft)	55684	46°43′35″N 102°54′57″W
KXMC-TV	Minot	13 (VHF)	13	April 3, 1953	produces separate local newscasts, but simulcasts KXMB-TV	16.1 kW	334 m (1,096 ft)	55685	48°3′0″N 101°23′32″W
KXMD-TV	Williston	14 (UHF)	11	October 25, 1969	simulcasts KXMC-TV	100 kW	257 m (843 ft)	55683	48°8′30″N 103°53′34″W
