= The CW =

American broadcast television network

The CW Network, LLC
- Logo used since January 14, 2024
- Type: Broadcast television network
- Country: United States
- Affiliates: State; Market
- Headquarters: Burbank, California, U.S.

Programming
- Language: English
- Picture format: 1080i (HDTV); Downscaled to 720p or 480i or upscaled to 1080p via ATSC 3.0 in some markets

Ownership
- Owner: Nexstar Media Group (81.1%); Skydance (18.9%)
- Key people: Brad Schwartz (president); Ryan Sharkey (SVP, Programming and Content Strategy); Heather Olander (Head, Scripted and Unscripted Programming); Michael Perman (Head, CW Sports)
- Sister channels: Antenna TV; NewsNation; Rewind TV; Quest; True Crime Network

History
- Founded: January 24, 2006; 20 years ago
- Launched: September 18, 2006; 20 years ago
- Replaced: The WB; UPN

Links
- Website: www.cwtv.com

Availability

Streaming media
- Service(s): DirecTV Stream, Hulu + Live TV, YouTube TV, Sling TV

The CW Network, LLC, commonly referred to as the CW, is an American commercial broadcast television network that is controlled by Nexstar Media Group, which holds a 81.1% ownership interest in the network, with Skydance holding an 18.9% stake. The network's name is derived from the first letters of the names of its two founding co-owners, CBS Corporation and Warner Bros. Entertainment, which were acquired by Paramount Global and Warner Bros. Discovery respectively. Nexstar acquired a 75% controlling stake in the network on October 3, 2022, with Paramount Global and Warner Bros. Discovery (now both merged into Skydance), each retaining a 12.5% ownership stake, for a combined 25% controlling stake. By June 2026, Nexstar had upped its controlling stake in the network to 81.1%, with Skydance controlling 18.9%.

The CW debuted on September 18, 2006, as the successor to UPN and the WB, which had both shut down that month. Its first two nights of programming—on September 18, 2006, and September 19, 2006—consisted of reruns and launch-related specials. The CW marked its formal launch date on September 20, 2006, with the two-hour premiere of the seventh cycle of America's Next Top Model. The network's programming lineup is intended to appeal mainly to viewers between the ages of 18 and 34, although from 2008 to 2011 the network shifted its programming to appeal to women in that demographic. As of August 2017, the network's audience was evenly split between men and women. Skydance became an owner of a 19% stake in The CW following the 2026 merger of Paramount Skydance and Warner Bros. Discovery.

The CW runs programming seven days a week: airing nightly in prime time along with a Saturday morning live-action educational programming block produced by Hearst Media Production Group called One Magnificent Morning.

The CW is also available in Canada on pay television providers through stations owned-and-operated by Nexstar and on affiliates owned by others that are located within proximity to the Canada–United States border (whose broadcasts of CW shows are subject to simultaneous substitution laws imposed by the Canadian Radio-television and Telecommunications Commission, if a Canadian network holds the broadcast rights); it is also available through two Nexstar-controlled stations that are classified in the U.S. as superstations—New York City–based de facto flagship (Note: Nexstar operates this station on behalf of Mission Broadcasting) WPIX and Los Angeles–based de jure flagship (Note: This station is directly owned-and-operated by Nexstar) KTLA.

Additionally, the network is available in northern Mexico through affiliates located near the Mexico–U.S. border (such as KUSI-TV—San Diego/Tijuana, KECY-DT3 in El Centro, California, KVIA-DT2 in El Paso, and KGBT-TV in (McAllen/Brownsville, Texas) on pay television providers. In both Canada and Mexico, some free-to-air CW affiliate signals originating from the U.S. are receivable over-the-air in border areas depending on the station's signal coverage.

In Central America, the Dominican Republic, the Caribbean, Ecuador, Peru, Argentina, Chile, Colombia, Venezuela, Brazil and Europe, many subscription providers carry either select U.S.-based CW-affiliated stations or the main network feed from The CW O&Os WPIX in New York City, WNLO in Buffalo, KTLA in Los Angeles, KRON-TV in San Francisco, WGN-TV in Chicago, KWGN-TV in Denver, WDCW in Washington, D.C., WPHL-TV in Philadelphia or KIAH in Houston.

== History ==
=== 1993–2006: Predecessors and formation ===
In April 1993, the Federal Communications Commission (FCC) ended the fin-syn rules that prohibited television networks from owning the rerun rights to programs they broadcast. Fearing that the networks would stop buying programs from independent studios, Warner Bros. Television and Paramount Television each decided to start their own networks.

The WB and UPN both launched within one week of each other in January 1995, just as the Fox Broadcasting Company had started to secure a foothold with American television audiences. The two networks launched to limited fanfare and generally mediocre to poor results. However, over the subsequent 11 1/2 seasons, both were able to air several series that became quite popular, such as The Wayans Bros., The Steve Harvey Show, Buffy the Vampire Slayer, The Jamie Foxx Show, Angel, Star Trek: Voyager, The Sentinel, 7th Heaven, Dawson's Creek, Charmed, Smallville, Everwood, Gilmore Girls, Reba and America's Next Top Model.

Although their simultaneous starts and competition for affiliate stations initially caused the two networks to appear as rivals, by 1999, they had adopted differing strategies: The WB targeted young women, while UPN targeted young men. Towards the end of their first decade on the air, the WB and UPN were in decline, unable to reach the audience share or have the effect that Fox had gained within its first decade, much less than that of the Big Three networks (ABC, CBS, and NBC). In the eleven years that UPN and the WB were in operation, the two networks lost a combined $2 billion. Chris-Craft Industries, Viacom, and Time Warner officials had discussed a possible merger of UPN and the WB as early as September 1995, only eight months after their respective launches; however, discussions ultimately broke down over issues on how to combine Chris-Craft and Tribune Broadcasting's station interests in the proposal to merge the networks, since the two companies' station portfolios overlapped with one another in several major markets. By 2003, however, Time Warner became mired in several debt problems. The company had already been responsible for shutting down Warner Bros.' in-house animation department and for selling off major portions of the conglomerate, such as the 2004 sale of Warner Bros. Records and the rest of Warner Music Group to an investor group led by Edgar Bronfman Jr. and Thomas H. Lee Partners.

The network's original pre-launch logo

Executives from CBS and Warner Bros. announced on January 24, 2006 that they would respectively shut down UPN and the WB; they would combine resources to form a new broadcast network, to be called the CW. They confirmed that the network would—at the outset—feature programming from both of its predecessors-to-be as well as new content developed specifically for the new network. Warner Bros. and CBS expected to produce inexpensive shows for the network, which they could sell outside the U.S. Then CBS chairman Les Moonves explained that the name of the new network was formed from the first letters of CBS and Warner Bros., joking, "We couldn't call it the WC for obvious reasons." Although some executives reportedly disliked the new name, Moonves stated in March 2006 that there was "zero chance" the name would change, citing research claiming 48% of the target demographic were already aware of the "CW" name.

In May 2006, the CW announced that it would pick up a combined thirteen programs from its two predecessors to air as part of the network's inaugural fall schedule: seven series held over from the WB (7th Heaven, Beauty and the Geek, Gilmore Girls, One Tree Hill, Reba, Smallville and Supernatural) and six held over from UPN (America's Next Top Model, Veronica Mars, Everybody Hates Chris, Girlfriends, All of Us and WWE SmackDown!). Upon the network's launch, the CW chose to use the scheduling model utilized by the WB due in part to the fact that it had a more extensive base programming schedule than UPN, allowing for a larger total of weekly programming time for the new network to fill. (The WB carried 30 hours of programming each week because it had a children's program block and a daytime lineup that UPN did not offer; UPN was primarily a prime time-only network with 10 weekly hours of network programming at the time of the network's shutdown.) Also, according to at least one news report, prior to launch, the network's "formal" name was set to be "The CW Television Network". It is believed that, by the time of the network's launch in 2006, the decision had been made, in the style of merging its predecessor networks to form the CW, to also merge the brandings of its predecessor networks as well (using the "The" from The WB & "Network" from UPN alongside utilizing "CW" in reference to CBS Corporation & Warner Bros.) for the CW's legal entity, while retaining The CW Television Network as the network's formal branding (while just "CW" would eventually come to be its public-facing branding).

=== 2006–2011: Launch and early struggles ===
Logo used from September 18, 2006 to January 13, 2024

Like UPN and the WB, the CW targets its programming towards younger audiences. CBS and Time Warner hoped that combining their networks' schedules and affiliate lineups would strengthen the CW into a fifth "major" broadcast network; however, research years later would indicate that, despite the combined efforts of the two companies in the creation of the CW resulting in the establishment of a persistent fifth network, the attempt at forming a fifth "major" network would end up falling short on account of significantly lower ratings and smaller viewership than the four majors, especially since, rather than appealing to a broad, mass-market demographic, the network focused primarily on younger demographics (adults 18–34 and teens), which limited its overall household reach compared to the majors. One week before the network's official launch, on September 11, 2006, a new, full version of the network website was launched, the website began to feature more in-depth information about the CW's shows.

The CW launched with a premiere special/launch party from the CBS Paramount-produced Entertainment Tonight at Warner Bros. Studios in Burbank, California on September 18, 2006, after a repeat of the tenth-season finale of 7th Heaven; the same schedule was repeated on September 19, 2006, with the sixth-season finale of Gilmore Girls. The network continued to air season finales from the previous season through the remainder of the first week, except for America's Next Top Model and WWE SmackDown!, which respectively began their new seasons on September 20, 2006, and September 22, 2006, with two-hour premieres. When Top Model made its network premiere on September 20, 2006, the CW scored a 3.4 rating/5 share (with hourly ratings of 3.1/5 and 3.6/6, the CW placed fifth overall) in the Nielsen household ratings. It scored a 2.6 rating among adults 18–49, finishing fourth in that age demographic and beating the 2.2 rating earned by Fox on that night. The network's second week consisted of season and series premieres for all of its other series from September 25, 2006, to October 1, 2006, with the exception of Veronica Mars, which debuted its third season on October 3, 2006.

Despite having several of the most popular programs carried over from UPN and the WB as part of its schedule, the CW—even though it experienced some success with newer programs that launched in subsequent seasons which became modest hits—largely struggled to gain an audience foothold throughout its first five years on the air. Because of declining viewership for the network during the 2007–08 season and effects from the Writers Guild of America strike, the network announced on March 4, 2008, that it would eliminate its comedy department (dismissing executive vice president of comedy Kim Fleary and senior vice president of comedy Steve Veisel), while also combining its drama and current programming departments into a single scripted programming unit. The corporate restructuring resulted in the layoffs of approximately 25 to 30 employees. It also included the elimination of certain positions, other newly opened positions being left unfilled, and layoffs from the Kids' WB unit, as the block was set to be replaced by the CW4Kids.

On May 9, 2008, the CW announced that it would lease its Sunday lineup (then running from 5 p.m. to 10 p.m. Eastern and Pacific Time) to production company Media Rights Capital (MRC). As Sundays have historically been a low-rated night for the network during its first two seasons on the air (due to stiff competition from CBS, ABC, and Fox's strong Sunday lineups, and complicated further by NBC's acquisition of Sunday Night Football in September 2006, shortly before the CW debuted), the move allowed the CW to concentrate on its Monday through Friday prime time schedule, while giving MRC the right to develop and schedule programs of its own choosing and reap advertising revenue generated by the lineup. The Sunday series that were scheduled—two reality series (4Real and In Harm's Way) and two scripted series (romantic dramedy Valentine and drama Easy Money)—performed poorly in the ratings (averaging only 1.04 million viewers), prompting the CW to scrap its agreement with MRC and program Sunday nights on its own starting on November 30, 2008. With no first-run programming available to run on Sundays as a backup, the network added reruns of The Drew Carey Show and Jericho, and movies to replace the MRC-produced programs.

One of the shows carried over to the network from UPN, WWE SmackDown, ended its run on the CW after the September 26, 2008 episode due to negotiations ending between the WWE and the CW on renewing the program. Representatives for the CW later confirmed that it had chosen not to continue carrying SmackDown because the network had redefined its target audience as exclusively females 18 to 34 years old, whereas SmackDown targeted a predominantly male audience. Following SmackDown's move to MyNetworkTV that same season, the Fox-owned network (which launched the same month as the CW's debut, albeit two weeks earlier, on September 5, 2006) started beating the CW in the Friday ratings every week from that program's debut on the network, though the CW continued to beat MyNetworkTV overall.

The CW generally struggled in the Nielsen ratings from its inception, primarily placing fifth in all statistics tabulated by Nielsen (total audience viewership and demographic ratings). On several occasions, the CW was even outrated by the Spanish-language network Univision. This led to speculation within the industry (including a May 16, 2008 article in The Wall Street Journal) that CBS, Time Warner or both companies might abandon the venture if ratings did not improve. However, the CW's fortunes were buoyed in the 2008–09 and 2009–10 television seasons thanks to increased ratings among females in the 18–34 demographic and the buzz that some of its newer series (such as Gossip Girl, 90210 and The Vampire Diaries) had generated with audiences. Executives with CBS Corporation and Time Warner also emphasized their commitment to the network.

On May 5, 2009, the CW announced that it would give the five hours of network time on Sundays back to its affiliated stations that fall, effectively becoming a weeknight-only network in prime time, in addition to the CW Daytime and the CW4Kids blocks (the latter block, airing on Saturday mornings, would remain the only weekend programming supplied by the network). This change meant the Sunday late afternoon repeat block that the CW inherited from the WB (formerly branded by that network as "EasyView") was discontinued. Subsequently, in mid-May, 65% of the CW's affiliates, including those carrying the CW Plus, signed agreements to air the replacement MGM Showcase movie package on Sundays.

=== 2011–2016: New leadership and content shift ===
On April 28, 2011, Mark Pedowitz was appointed by the network to succeed original president of entertainment Dawn Ostroff; Pedowitz was made the network's first president and assumed broader responsibilities in the CW's business operations than Ostroff had. As president of entertainment, Ostroff oversaw entertainment operations while John Maatta, the network's chief operating officer, handled business affairs; both reported to a board consisted of CBS and Warner Bros. executives. Maatta began reporting to Pedowitz as a result of the latter's appointment as network president. Pedowitz revealed that the core target demographic of the network would not change, though the CW would attempt to lure new viewers. Pedowitz began looking to bring comedies back to the CW after Ostroff had publicly declared that the difficulty of developing comedies for its target demographic was the reason for their removal from the network following the 2008–09 season (with Everybody Hates Chris, and The Game—a spin-off of Girlfriends—becoming the last comedies to be cancelled). The network also ordered more episodes of its original series and ran them consecutively starting on September 12 through the first week of December without repeats. In July 2012, Pedowitz no longer referred to the target demographic of the CW as women 18–34, but rather that it would now be an "18–34 adult network".

Although the network was still not profitable, CBS and Warner Bros. were very successful in selling their CW shows overseas. In 2011, a $1 billion deal with streaming service Netflix became another way to sell CW shows. The introduction of action-superhero series Arrow, based on DC Comics' Green Arrow, received favorable reviews from critics and became a hit with audiences when it premiered. As evidence of the network's refocusing toward a broader audience, Arrow not only premiered to some of the highest viewership totals in the network's history (the third-highest overall as of 2015, behind the series premieres of The Vampire Diaries and The Flash), but it also gave the network its strongest performance in the demographic of males 18–34 since Smallville ended its run in May 2011. The network also found success with its summer programming in 2013 with the revival of the U.S. version of the improv comedy series Whose Line Is It Anyway?, which later became a year-round staple on the network's schedule. Arrow continued to perform strongly, leading to a spin-off with The Flash, which surpassed The Vampire Diaries as the highest-rated premiere in the network's history and became the most-watched show on the network. Jane the Virgin earned some of the highest critical praise of any series during the 2014–15 television season, and became the first CW series ever to be nominated for, and win, a Golden Globe Award, with lead actress Gina Rodriguez winning the Golden Globe for Best Actress - Television Series Musical or Comedy. Other CW shows like The Flash, The 100, and Nikita would also go on to be nominated for Primetime Emmy Awards categories, and several shows from 2011 to 2019 being nominated for categories in the Teen Choice Awards, Saturn Awards, and others.

Overall, the network ended the 2014–15 season posting its highest average total viewership in a single television season since 2007–08 with 2.15 million viewers, a 12% increase in total viewership year-to-year; the CW also posted its highest seasonal demographic ratings among males ages 18–49 with a 0.8 share.

Expanding on the success of the network's Arrowverse franchise, DC's Legends of Tomorrow premiered to high ratings for the network and became the most-watched show on the network's Thursday night block in two years. The 2015–16 season also saw Crazy Ex-Girlfriend become one of the most critically acclaimed shows of the season and the second show on the network to be nominated for, and win, a Golden Globe Award, with actress Rachel Bloom winning a Golden Globe Award for Best Actress - Television Series Musical or Comedy.

=== 2016–2021: Streaming era deals ===
The network's Arrowverse expanded again with Supergirl being moved to the network from CBS for its second season. The debut of Archie Comics-based Riverdale signaled the network's foray into mining their parent studio's library of IP to create new television series based on recognizable properties. This led to another new DC Comics series, Black Lightning, and a rebooted Dynasty. While it met with poor ratings, Dynasty proved lucrative thanks to the Netflix output deal and international syndication, which earned CBS Studios millions of dollars per episode.

Selling CW series like Dynasty to Netflix and overseas markets was so profitable for Warner Bros. and CBS that the network almost stopped cancelling shows, and expanded its broadcast schedule. On February 14, 2018, the CW announced that it would add a 2-hour primetime block on Sunday nights beginning in the fourth quarter of 2018 (it later added a third hour in October 2023), returning the network to Sundays for the first time since the lease to Media Rights Capital ended in 2009, as well as expanding the CW's primetime slate from 10 hours a week to 12. Discussions with CBS and Warner Bros. about the expansion began as early as July 2017; both gave their approval to the move that December, with the network reaching clearance deals with key affiliate partners in early 2018.

On June 12, 2018, AT&T received antitrust approval to acquire Warner Bros. parent Time Warner, with the acquisition closing two days later. Time Warner was renamed WarnerMedia and AT&T became a co-owner of the CW with CBS.

The CW debuted reboots of Charmed, Roswell, and Originals spin-off Legacies during the 2018–19 season. Despite modest ratings, their renewals—along with the renewal of the entire 2018–19 lineup (absent those series already previously announced as ending)—reflected their value to the network's founding co-owners CBS and Warner Bros., which received the windfall of selling them to Netflix and international buyers. This strategy continued with the 2019–20 season debuts of the new Arrowverse series Batwoman, Riverdale spin-off Katy Keene, and Nancy Drew.

On August 13, 2019, CBS and Viacom officially announced their intention to re-merge, with the combined company to be named ViacomCBS. The merger was completed on December 4, 2019, making them officially with AT&T's WarnerMedia co-owners of the CW.

WarnerMedia and ViacomCBS did not renew CW's Netflix deal in 2019, intending to use their shows on the network for their own streaming services. International sales also mostly ended, because both companies wanted to retain rights to their own shows to compete with Netflix outside the U.S. WarnerMedia's HBO Max streaming service subsequently acquired exclusive streaming rights to Warner Bros.-produced CW shows. This began with the 2019–20 season, with the Warner Bros.-produced Batwoman and Katy Keene debuting on HBO Max after their current seasons finished airing on the CW. The CBS Studios-produced Nancy Drew was originally announced to be heading to corporate-sibling owned CBS All Access, but appeared on HBO Max instead. The reason for this was amid the rebranding of CBS All Access to Paramount+ and the changes surrounding the ViacomCBS merger, CBS and Warner Bros. made the collective decision to have all CW shows have a singular streaming home on HBO Max.

Beyond being the streaming home of CW programming, HBO Max shares a co-ownership connection with the network, which allows for programming partnerships. This began with DC Comics series Stargirl, which the CW shared with DC Universe. DC Universe and the CW co-financed the series, with episodes premiering on DC Universe and airing the next day on the CW. After DC Universe was folded into HBO Max, Stargirl was renewed with a new co-finance deal in which the CW receives first-run airings followed by its launch on HBO Max. Going forward, the CW and HBO Max will continue to collaborate on potentially co-financing new projects, with the model of premiering first on HBO Max and a second run on the CW. "They creatively have to want the show too and believe that the show should go on their platform first for them to work," CW CEO Pedowitz said. "For us its a great model because it's a way to get excellent summer scripted programming and maximize programming across platforms."

On May 13, 2021, the CW announced that it would begin programming Saturday nights on a regular basis beginning in the 2021–22 television season, following approval of the expansion by the network's key affiliate groups. As part of the deal, the CW ceased programming the CW Daytime block and returned the time to its stations. With the addition of Saturday nights, the CW has programming on every night of the week for the first time in the network's history, becoming only the sixth US English-language commercial broadcast network ever and the first since Fox to have offered prime time content on a nightly basis.

=== 2022: Acquisition by Nexstar ===
On January 5, 2022, The Wall Street Journal reported that WarnerMedia and ViacomCBS were exploring a possible sale of either a majority stake or all of the CW, and that Nexstar Media Group, which became the CW's largest affiliate group when it acquired former WB-era network co-owner Tribune Broadcasting in 2019, was considered a leading bidder. Network president and CEO Mark Pedowitz confirmed talks of a potential sale but added that it was "too early to speculate what might happen". Nexstar CEO Perry Sook in Spring 2022 did not confirm the rumored buyout but stated that he would not be surprised if Nexstar owned a broadcast network.

In May 2022, three months before Nexstar made their purchase official, the CW cancelled ten shows, three times the average number per year that the CW had canceled over the previous decade, including one-season shows 4400 and Naomi, and longtime fixtures including Dynasty, Legends of Tomorrow, Roswell, New Mexico, and Legacies. More shows were cancelled or given final season orders in the following months including Nancy Drew, Stargirl, The Flash, and Riverdale.

In late June 2022, The Wall Street Journal indicated a purchase of the CW by Nexstar was close, and on August 15 Nexstar confirmed it had "entered into a definitive agreement" to acquire a 75% majority share in the network; the remaining 25% would be shared equally by Paramount Global (the former ViacomCBS) and Warner Bros. Discovery (the company formed by Discovery, Inc.'s acquisition of WarnerMedia from AT&T). Additionally, Nexstar stated that Mark Pedowitz would remain the chairman and CEO of the CW. Though no monetary terms were announced, Nexstar reportedly would not pay any cash or stock up front, and would absorb approximately $100 million of network debt. The Hollywood Reporter stated that Nexstar retained $54 million based on its cash on hand, accounts receivable, accounts payable and other liabilities. As the sale did not entail the transfer of any FCC broadcast licenses, Nexstar immediately took operational control of the network.

Nexstar, in a conference call that took place the day its purchase was announced, indicated a desire to run the CW cost-consciously. Citing research that indicated the network spends "almost twice" the amount other broadcast networks spend on programming, a partial reason for the May 2022 cancellations, Nexstar stated that it planned to seek shows with smaller production budgets or a reasonably-priced acquisition fee, including unscripted fare, syndicated content, and other content that can create profits through broadcast airings. Nexstar also stated that it aimed for the CW to turn a profit by 2025.

In the conference call, Nexstar indicated that it wanted to convert the CW into a network with broad appeal. It cited data indicating that the young audience which the CW focused upon preferred watching its shows through streaming platforms instead of during live broadcasts, while the average audience of a broadcast CW affiliate was approximately 58 years old. Nexstar indicated that it would focus on the older audiences as well and not just the younger demographic. In particular, Nexstar was reported to have been seeking older-skewing dramas, police procedurals, and sitcoms.

Paramount Global and Warner Bros. Discovery would still produce content for the CW as primary content suppliers, though Nexstar noted that the arrangement would be primarily for the 2022–23 broadcast season. It indicated that it "will have the option to extend the partnership" with Paramount and WBD beyond that season. Nexstar stated in September 2022 that it would seek to supplement the CW's content by acquiring projects from studios beyond solely Paramount and WBD. while any the CW content not licensed to other streaming services would continue to appear on its own streaming platform CW Seed.

On October 3, Nexstar officially announced that it had closed the deal to acquire the majority ownership of the CW. Longtime chairman and CEO Mark Pedowitz resigned from his role, with Dennis Miller taking over as the president of the CW. Rick Haskins, the CW's chief branding officer and president of the network's streaming division, as well as chief financial officer Mitch Nedick were let go on the same day. Thirty to forty employees were laid off on November 1, including several executives. Longtime executive Paul Hewitt was replaced with Beth Feldman as the senior vice president of the network's communications unit. On the following day, Brad Schwartz was appointed as the president for the entertainment division, overseeing programming strategy, creative and brand development, and day-to-day operations.

On November 8, Nexstar announced that the carryover programming from the former majority parent companies of the CW, Paramount and WBD, would be minimal by the 2023–24 season.

=== 2023–present: Focus on sports and unscripted ===
On February 1, 2023, the CW appointed Heather Olander as the head of unscripted programming, a position under which she reports to Schwartz. In a shift away from scripted programming, it also let go of Executive VP for Current Programming Michael Roberts, and Executive VP for Development Gaye Hirsch, among other layoffs on the following day. The CW appointed Chris Spadaccini as the chief marketing officer on February 6, 2023, and Tom Martin as the head of business affairs and general counsel on February 9, 2023. It later appointed Betzy Slenzak as the vice president of unscripted programming on March 30, 2023, and Ashley Hovey as the network's first chief digital officer on April 11, 2023.

On May 18, 2023, the CW unveiled its schedule for the 2023–24 broadcast season, consisting mostly of acquired shows from outside the U.S., and unscripted series. Schwartz criticized the previous co-owners of the network, stating that it would no longer exist for benefiting them, and that the shows left over from the previous regimes did not perform well on linear broadcast. He added that in order to achieve profitability, the CW was focusing on acquired shows and co-productions while expanding its audience. He also revealed that the network was in production or negotiations for a total of 72 shows. On February 25, 2023, CW Sports was launched by acquiring the rights to LIV Golf and soon expanded by acquiring ACC college football and basketball games, Inside the NFL, the NASCAR Xfinity Series, (Note: The CW's deal to broadcast the NASCAR Xfinity Series was supposed to start with the 2025 season-opener, but was pushed up to the 26th race of the 2024 season, which was the Food City 300.) and WWE NXT. In August 2023, Schwartz stated that the network was involved in many upcoming US-produced scripted shows and will focus on getting monetization rights on any scripted content it broadcasts, while producing shows at a profitable price point. He also stated that they were using sports programming for bringing in new and older audiences. Nexstar CEO Perry Sook later stated that, beyond causing the delay of four scripted shows, the 2023 Writers Guild of America and SAG-AFTRA strikes did not have much impact on the CW's fall schedule, adding that they would not affect the network's future progress.

In January 2024, during the 29th Critics' Choice Awards, The CW launched a new brand identity by DixonBaxi—which updated the logo with a bolder appearance, changed the network's main color from green to red-orange, and introduced a new "stage" device used in promos (formed by extending the C lettering from the logo), as well as a new sound trademark of a struck match. Spadaccini explained that the rebranding was intended to help make the network's brand more consistent and optimized for digital platforms, the word "The" was removed from the logo to streamline its appearance (especially in use cases such as "CW Original" or "CW Sports"). Spadaccini said that the network's name and verbal branding would remain the CW.

The CW unveiled its Fall schedule for the 2024–25 broadcast season in May 2024, with programming consisting of co-produced scripted series, game shows, unscripted series, and an expansion of CW Sports. Three of its four remaining pre-Nexstar scripted series, Superman & Lois, All American: Homecoming, and Walker, would conclude that year. Miller and Schwartz revealed that the network planned to air its own television films later in 2024, with Miller adding that they planned to do more deals for sports programming. The CW's losses meanwhile declined by $50 million for the first quarter of 2024, compared to the $100 million loss during the quarter when Nexstar acquired it. In June 2024, Schwartz stated that he hoped to have more scripted series on air, but their new financial model necessitated finding production partners. CW Studios was launched in August 2024 after the CW pulled The Librarians: The Next Chapter from their Fall schedule and sold the series to TNT. The CW retained a stake in the series through the newly formed studio, providing the network with an in-house production arm.

Miller departed as president of the CW in October 2024, with Brad Schwartz being promoted to fill the role. In November 2024, Nexstar reported that the CW had reduced its operating losses by $119 million year-to-date, exceeding the goal of $100 million for the year. Nexstar executives attributed this to lower cost programming and credited the growing CW Sports portfolio for increasing the network's viewership. The CW underwent a round of layoffs later in the same month to streamline the network's focus on sports and unscripted programming, with Liz Wise Lyall, head of the scripted programming department, and Betsy Slenzak, vice president of the unscripted programming department, exiting. In December 2024, Nexstar acquired additional ownership of The CW, raising its stake from 75% to 77.1%.

Michael Perman was appointed as the Senior Vice President of CW Sports in February 2025, overseeing programming and media rights for the division. Nexstar President and COO Mike Biard stated later in the same month that the network would become profitable by 2026. By the end of the fiscal year 2024-25, the CW had reduced its year-over-year losses by $126 million. During the first quarter of the fiscal year 2025–26, the CW recorded its strongest primetime performance in the past eight quarters, despite increasing its loss compared to the same quarter in the previous year. In June 2025, the CW ordered six television movies inspired by the Harlequin romance novels which would be broadcast on the network during fall 2025, starting with Montana Mavericks which received a theatrical release before airing.

Nexstar CFO Lee Ann Gliha stated in December 2025 that the programming costs of the CW had been more than halved, with programming hours increasing by 40% and the sports portfolio accounting for 40% of its programming. Gliha noted that the CW's owned-and-operated stations were profitable for Nexstar, and that the CW itself was on track to turn a profit in 2026. The CW's viewership increased by 13% in 2025, largely accredited towards the airing of sports.

In April 2026, the CW announced a pair of streaming partnerships with the Disney-owned ESPN and Fox-owned Roku. Under the deals, the CW's entertainment programming would stream next-day on The Roku Channel while CW Sports programming would be simulcast on the ESPN app for subscribers of the "Unlimited" tier. The CW's own app would continue to offer next-day streams of its programming. All American, the final pre-Nexstar scripted series on the CW, concluded on September 28, 2026, with the network having shifted its strategy from attracting young adults into becoming a mainstream platform attracting a large audience of all ages.

== Programming ==
=== Network programming and scheduling ===
As of October 1, 2023, the CW provides 18 hours of regularly scheduled network programming each week, over the course of seven days. The network offers 15 hours of prime time programming to its owned-and-operated and affiliated stations, airing from 8 p.m. to 10 p.m. Eastern and Pacific Time on Monday through Saturday nights and 7 p.m. to 10 p.m. (Eastern and Pacific) on Sunday nights. Outside of prime time, a three-hour educational programming block called "One Magnificent Morning" (which airs as part of the CW schedule through a time-lease agreement with Hearst Media Production Group) airs on Saturday mornings from 8 a.m. to 11 a.m. in all time zones, subject to re-schedulings due to local or CW sports broadcasts.

Similar to Fox, along with network forerunners the WB and UPN, the CW uses the "common prime" scheduling practice, avoiding the 10 p.m. (Eastern and Pacific) hour broadcast by the "Big Three" networks (NBC, CBS, and ABC). The network, unlike the Big Three, does not air any national newscasts, late-night programming, and, since 2021, daytime programming (outside of sports). It also did not run prime-time programming on Saturday nights and during the primetime access hour on Sundays until the 2021–22 and 2023–24 broadcast seasons respectively. Because of these factors, the CW's affiliates handle the responsibility of programming non-network time periods, with the majority of its stations filling those slots mainly with syndicated programming. However, some of the network's affiliates broadcast their own local news or sports programs (either produced by the station itself or through outsourcing agreements with an affiliate of another network), preempting network prime time programming to a specific time period (New York City affiliate WPIX, for instance, preempts CW prime time to the afternoon).

The Hearst-produced Saturday morning block, One Magnificent Morning (which is subject to scheduling variances similar to the weekday hour in some markets, such as in Atlanta and San Diego), is designed to be tape delayed and therefore recommended to air in the same time slot in all time zones. However, it is broadcast one hour earlier on affiliates of the CW Plus in the Central, Mountain and Alaska Time Zones. In Guam, CW Plus affiliate KTKB-LD in Hagåtña airs the CW lineup on a one-day tape delay from its initial broadcast because of the time difference between Guam and the continental United States as the island is on the west side of the International Date Line.

Supernatural (which initially aired on the WB) was the final CW series carried over from either of the network's respective predecessors that continued to be broadcast, airing its final episode in November 2020.

The CW formerly aired short segments during commercial breaks within certain episodes of its programs known as "Content Wraps"—a play on the network's name—to advertise one company's product during part or the entirety of a commercial break, a concept since classified under the term of native advertising. The entertainment magazine series CW Now was inspired in part by the success of the Content Wraps as it was intended to be a series with product placement; the program was canceled in 2008, after a single 23-episode season. For the 2006–07 season, the CW reached an agreement with American Eagle Outfitters to incorporate tie-ins with the company's aerie clothing line as part of the Content Wrap concept within the network's Tuesday night schedule, which included subjects in the commercials commenting on plot points in each of the shows. The agreement was cut down to regular advertising in February 2007, after a fan backlash by viewers of both shows and general criticism of the campaign.

=== News programming ===
The CW began to introduce national news programming under Nexstar ownership, in partnerships with sister properties NewsNation and The Hill. It aired its first national news special on December 6, 2023, simulcasting the fourth Republican presidential primary debate with NewsNation. In February 2024, it was reported that the network was developing a Sunday morning talk show with The Hill. The new program was later announced as The Hill Sunday with Chris Stirewalt, which premiered March 3, 2024 on NewsNation, and made its CW premiere on April 7, 2024. The CW would simulcast NewsNation's Decision Desk 2024 coverage of the 2024 United States presidential election on November 5, 2024, and Chris Cuomo-hosted town halls with president Donald Trump on April 30, and on the federal government shutdown on October 15 (headlined by guest Tom Homan).

Local news programming on CW affiliates—if any—is often outsourced to another major network affiliate in the market, usually a sister station via co-ownership or local marketing agreements, or as part of an outsourcing agreement with a third-party. Scheduling of local news often mirrors that of Fox affiliates, with local morning shows intended to compete with the national morning shows on the Big Three networks (and often being an extension of a morning show on a Big Three affiliate), and prime time newscasts within the 10 p.m.–11 p.m. Eastern/Pacific (9 p.m.–10 p.m. Central/Mountain) time slot following network programming.

Only six CW stations have autonomous local news operations, most of which carried over from previous affiliations: WPIX in New York City, WGN in Chicago, and KTLA in Los Angeles started their news departments as independent stations or during early affiliations with other networks including DuMont (KTLA) and CBS (WGN); WISH-TV in Indianapolis (formerly CBS) has been airing local news since 1956, KRON-TV in San Francisco (formerly NBC and MyNetworkTV) has produced local news since 1957, while KUSI-TV in San Diego has aired local news since 1990. KTLA has the largest number of weekly hours devoted to local news programming of any CW affiliate, and any broadcast television station in the U.S., with 94 3/4 hours of scheduled news each week.

=== Sports programming ===
The CW agreed to a three-year broadcast deal in January 2023 with LIV Golf, a professional golf tour financed by Saudi Arabia's Public Investment Fund, marking the first-ever national sports broadcasting contract for both the network and the tour. On February 14, 2023, the network said their LIV Golf coverage would be available in 100% of media markets in the U.S., but encountered numerous affiliates that declined carriage of the tour, including all eight owned by Paramount Global. Consequently, LIV coverage in those affected markets aired on Nexstar-owned stations or subchannels, or on other stations via secondary affiliation agreements. Both the network and Nexstar were criticized by the National Press Club for participating in alleged sportswashing by the Saudi government following the assassination of journalist Jamal Khashoggi in 2018.

The CW announced in July 2023 that it had acquired the exclusive broadcast rights to 50 Atlantic Coast Conference (ACC) college football and basketball games each season through 2026–27, with Raycom Sports producing the broadcasts. In May 2026, the CW and ESPN reached a sublicensing agreement for the CW to broadcast 54 ACC football and basketball games annually through 2030–31, with the games also being broadcast live on the ESPN app.

On July 28, the CW announced it had picked up the media rights to the NASCAR Xfinity Series in a seven-year deal starting in 2025 and going through the 2031 season. The CW will broadcast 33 races annually, along with practice and qualifying events. NASCAR Productions will produce the broadcasts. On April 11, 2024, it was announced that the deal's start was pushed up to September 2024, beginning with the 26th race of the season and regular season finale, the Food City 300.

On November 7, 2023, it was announced that WWE NXT would be moving to the CW from USA Network in a five-year deal that began in October 2024. This marked the first time that WWE programming aired on the CW since 2013, when Saturday Morning Slam aired on the defunct Vortexx children's programming block; the CW aired SmackDown! from the network's launch to 2008. On April 28, 2026, this deal was expanded to include WWE's NXT-branded Premium Live Events, with a total of 20 events over multiple years starting that June.

The CW and Range Sports announced an agreement in January 2024 under which Range Sports would develop content in conjunction with Nexstar and CW Sports, in addition to assisting the CW with talent representation, brand consulting, data and analytics and provide production capabilities for scripted and unscripted programs by using the resources of its parent company Range Media Partners.

The CW in May 2024 gained rights for broadcasting eleven Pac-12 football games featuring Oregon State University and Washington State University football teams for the 2024 season. In April 2025, it gained the rights for broadcasting nine Pac-12 games in the 2025 season. Pac-12 and the CW extended their partnership in August 2025 to 2030-31, with The CW gaining rights to air 13 regular season football games, 35 men's basketball games and 15 women's basketball games annually, beginning in 2026.

In August 2024, the CW acquired rights to air the 2024 Chicago Open Men's and Women's finals from the Association of Volleyball Professionals (AVP). In March 2025, the AVP renewed its agreement with the CW for multi-year rights to broadcast its volleyball matches from across the U.S. on Saturday nights, from Memorial Day till Labor Day.

In March 2025, the CW gained rights to broadcast the 4th Annual Men's HBCU All-Star Basketball Game. In April 2025, the CW and the Professional Bowlers Association (PBA) reached a two-year media rights agreement, which was negotiated in cooperation with the IMG, to broadcast ten PBA events. In July 2025, The CW and Professional Bull Riders reached a multi-year agreement for broadcasting PBR Camping World Team Series events on Saturday and Sunday. The deal was extended till 2029 in November 2026, with The CW gaining rights to exclusively broadcast PBR Team Series events on Sunday beginning with the 2027 season.

In February 2026, The CW and Mountain West Conference reached an agreement for rights to broadcasting 13 regular-season football games, 20 regular-season men's basketball games, and 15 regular-season women's basketball games for six years. In September 2026, the CW gained the rights to air the final seven races of the NHRA Mission Foods Drag Racing Series from 2027 onwards.

Outside of network programming, several CW affiliates have carried telecasts of basketball, football and in some cases, other collegiate sporting events (such as baseball or hockey) that are produced by syndicators, while a few carry games from local teams of major professional sports leagues such as Major League Baseball (the New York Mets on WPIX) and the NBA (the Los Angeles Clippers on KTLA).

=== Children's programming ===
On September 23, 2006, the Kids' WB children's programming block—which originated on The WB in September 1995 and continued to be produced by Warner Bros.—was carried over to the CW as part of its inaugural programming lineup; although the network on which it originated ceased operations, the "Kids' WB" branding was retained for the block.

On October 2, 2007, through a joint decision between corporate parents Warner Bros. and CBS Corporation, the CW announced that it would shut down Kids' WB and lease the programming rights of the Saturday morning timeslots to 4Kids Entertainment (which was producing a competing children's programming block, 4Kids TV, for Fox at the time of the announcement). The CW cited competition from children's cable networks and a challenging advertising marketplace as factors in the decision. Kids' WB ended its nearly thirteen-year run on May 17, 2008 (though some CW affiliates that delayed the block to Sundays, such as Atlanta affiliate WUPA, aired the block for the last time on May 18).

The following week on May 24, 4Kids Entertainment took over programming of the CW's Saturday morning timeslots, with the debut of a new block, The CW4Kids. Its lineup initially consisted mostly of programs carried over from Kids' WB and 4Kids TV, before eventually adding first-run 4Kids-produced shows such as Chaotic as well as new seasons of Yu-Gi-Oh! and Teenage Mutant Ninja Turtles. The block was rebranded to Toonzai on August 14, 2010 (though The CW4Kids name was retained as a sub-brand to fulfill branding obligations with the network). Toonzai ended its run on August 18, 2012, after 4Kids Entertainment auctioned off their assets in bankruptcy court.

On July 3, 2012, Saban Brands announced that they had acquired the rights to program the CW's Saturday morning timeslots from 4Kids Entertainment in bankruptcy proceedings. The block was relaunched as Vortexx on August 25, featuring programs produced by Saban Brands such as Power Rangers Lost Galaxy and Digimon Fusion. Vortexx also aired notable third-party programming such as WWE Saturday Morning Slam, which marked the return of WWE programming to the network since WWE Smackdown departed in 2008.

On June 5, 2014, the CW announced an agreement with Litton Entertainment (now Hearst Media Production Group) to program a block of live-action series designed to comply with the FCC's educational programming guidelines. Vortexx (which was the last remaining non-educational children's block on the major U.S. broadcast networks) was replaced by One Magnificent Morning on October 4. The block features a mix of wildlife and lifestyle-themed programs, similar to those featured on the Litton-produced blocks aired by ABC and CBS. On January 7, 2016, the CW and Litton announced a five-year renewal for the block, extending it through the 2020–21 broadcast season. Starting with the 2017–18 broadcast season, the block's running time was reduced to three hours. On July 1, 2021, the CW and Litton announced another multi-year extension for the block.

== Stations ==
The CW has over 46 stations owned or operated by its majority owner Nexstar Media Group and current and pending affiliation agreements with 221 additional television stations encompassing 50 states, the District of Columbia and three U.S. possessions. Counting only conventional CW affiliates and over-the-air affiliates of the CW Plus, the network has an estimated combined national reach of 100% of all households in the U.S. (or 330,866,316 Americans with at least one television set); this makes the CW the largest U.S. broadcast network by population reach percentage. As of January 2023, three U.S. states (Delaware, New Hampshire, and New Jersey) and three U.S. territories (American Samoa, Puerto Rico and the United States Virgin Islands) do not have their own locally licensed CW affiliates, largely because those areas are either located within the broadcast ranges of stations in nearby states or served by out-of-market stations via cable or satellite. Delaware is served by Philadelphia's WPHL-TV and Salisbury, Maryland affiliate WMDT-DT2, while New Hampshire is served by four CW stations based in three neighboring states (including Boston affiliate WLVI). New Jersey is served by WPHL and New York City affiliate WPIX.

As a newer broadcast network, the CW maintains affiliations with low-power stations (broadcasting either in analog or digital) in a few markets, such as Boise, Idaho (KYUU-LD). In some markets, including both of those mentioned, these stations also maintain digital simulcasts on a subchannel of a co-owned/co-managed full-power television station. The CW also maintains a sizeable number of subchannel-only affiliations, the majority of which are with stations in cities located outside of the 50 largest Nielsen-designated markets and receive the network's programming via the CW Plus; the largest subchannel-only CW affiliate by market size, as of February 1, 2024, is WZTV-DT2 in Nashville, Tennessee.

Nexstar Media Group is the largest operator of CW stations by numerical total, owning or providing services to 41 CW-affiliated stations, and also is the largest in terms of overall market reach, owning or providing services to CW stations (including its largest affiliates in New York and Los Angeles), covering 32% of the U.S.

=== Digital multicasting and cable television ===
Unlike the other major networks, the CW distributes its programming in small and certain mid-sized markets throughout the U.S. (generally those ranked among the bottom 110 Nielsen media markets) through the CW Plus, a separate national feed and programming service that is carried on a mixture of full-power and low-power stations in some markets, and cable-only outlets and digital subchannel affiliations on major network stations in markets that do not have enough commercial stations to support a standalone CW affiliate (several of the CW Plus's digital subchannel outlets originally operated as cable-only affiliates at the network's launch). The programming service offers its own master schedule of syndicated and brokered programming acquired by the network (including some feature films and infomercials) during non-network programming time, although some CW Plus affiliates may also run local newscasts produced by a major network affiliate.

CW predecessor the WB previously had two cable-only affiliate outlets: WGN America, the national superstation feed of WGN-TV at the time, from January 1995 to October 1999 and network-operated the WB 100+ Station Group (the direct predecessor to the CW Plus), which was formed in September 1998 and had several of its cable-only outlets join the CW Plus at the CW network's launch. Not all of the network's cable-only affiliates were CW Plus outlets; WT05 in Toledo, Ohio offered its own schedule of syndicated programs during non-network time that was programmed by its then-owner Block Communications, which also operates that market's major cable provider Buckeye CableSystem (WT05 now exists as "CW13", having been converted into a digital subchannel of Gray Television-owned ABC affiliate WTVG in October 2014). Though the CW is the only network with a station group that includes cable-only outlets, it is actually one of only three networks that have had cable-only stations within its affiliate body (ABC formerly had a cable-only affiliate in Winchester, Virginia-based TV3 Winchester until Gray shut the channel down in December 2013).

=== Affiliate issues ===
==== Problems with Time Warner Cable ====
Some Time Warner Cable subscribers around the country were unable to watch CW programming when the network debuted, as stations in several markets were not able to reach carriage deals with the provider to distribute the local affiliates. In markets such as Charleston, South Carolina; El Paso, Texas; Honolulu, Hawaii; Palm Springs, California; Beaumont; Waco and Corpus Christi, Texas, where the CW is broadcast on a digital subchannel of one of the market's major network affiliates, there were unsuccessful attempts in getting Time Warner Cable to carry the subchannel affiliates (CW then-co-parent Time Warner had owned Time Warner Cable until it spun off the provider into a separate company in 2009; TWC was later acquired by Charter Communications in 2016).

Some affiliates eventually signed carriage deals with Time Warner Cable, but not all of the CW affiliates received carriage on the provider's basic cable tiers (for example, Syracuse, New York affiliate WSTQ-LP could only be viewed on digital cable channel 266 in the Ithaca market). The largest market without a known affiliate is the Johnstown–Altoona market, whose closest CW station was CBS-owned WPCW (now WPKD-TV, an independent station) in Pittsburgh, which is carried on Charter's Johnstown and Altoona area systems; WPKD-TV was originally targeted to serve that area before it refocused its programming toward the Pittsburgh market in the late 1990s.

On February 2, 2007, Beaumont, Texas CBS station KFDM made its CW-affiliated subchannel available to Time Warner Cable customers in the market on channel 10. On April 20, 2007, ABC affiliate KVIA-TV in El Paso, Texas began broadcasting its CW-affiliated subchannel on Time Warner Cable channel 13. On April 21, 2007, KCWQ-LP made its broadcast debut on channel 5 on Time Warner Cable in the Palm Springs area.

==== Pappas Telecasting bankruptcy ====
One of the network's major affiliate groups, Pappas Telecasting Companies, filed for Chapter 11 bankruptcy for thirteen of its television stations on May 10, 2008. Within the petition, Pappas specifically cited the network's low ratings and lackluster performance as one of many complications that had forced it to make the filing. Several of the stations have since been sold either in business transactions with representatives involved in Pappas's bankruptcy proceedings or via station auction processes as the company winds down operations.

Although Pappas had originally stated that none of its stations would be affected at all by the closing, two stations owned by the company that were formerly affiliated with the CW have ceased operations. On May 29, 2008, Yakima, Washington affiliate KCWK (which served the south-central portion of that state) shut down and the station's offices were closed, leaving that area without locally based CW programming and forcing pay television providers to carry Los Angeles affiliate KTLA in order to provide the network's programming to their subscribers. The situation was resolved in April 2009, when Fisher Communications announced that its CBS affiliates in the area, KIMA-TV and satellite station KEPR-TV, would carry the network through DTT subchannel affiliations.

Subsequently, WLGA in Columbus, Georgia lost its CW affiliation in April 2009 to a subchannel of NBC affiliate WLTZ because of the network's concerns about Pappas' financial state; WLGA ultimately ceased operations in June 2010 as it was unable to compete in the market as an independent station.

==== Tribune's relations with the CW ====
While Tribune Media had solid affiliation deals with the CW on several of its stations, it also maintained a strong affiliation alliance with Fox. But with new management and ownership taking over Tribune in 2008, it was apparent that the company would switch one of its CW-affiliated stations to Fox (at least those in markets without a Fox owned-and-operated station or a former O&O that was acquired by Local TV, which Tribune later acquired in 2013), adding to more questions surrounding the CW's future. In a March 2008 seminar by Tribune's then-chairman and CEO Sam Zell, it was revealed that the company's San Diego outlet KSWB-TV would switch its affiliation from the CW to Fox that August, with KSWB assuming the Fox affiliation from XETV-TV, which had been a Fox charter affiliate since that network's October 1986 inception. XETV (which is licensed to Tijuana, Baja California, Mexico under the ownership of Grupo Televisa but whose U.S. operations are programmed by Bay City Television) was not informed of Zell's deal until it was made public.

After the news broke, XETV planned on suing to prevent the switch because it would violate an affiliation contract that XETV had with Fox that was not set to expire until 2010. However, on July 2, 2008, XETV announced that it would join the CW on August 1 (the same day that KSWB became a Fox affiliate) and rebrand as "San Diego 6". Though twelve of Tribune's thirteen other CW-affiliated stations have remained with the network, all of them began to de-emphasize the network from their branding (e.g., "CW 11") in favor of one with a stronger local identity. On-air branding that excised the CW name began being implemented by the stations in July 2008, either on-air (in the case of KWGN-TV) or through their websites (as part of a redesign for all of the Tribune stations' websites). Some of these stations eventually began reincorporating the CW branding starting in 2011, such as KDAF/Dallas, KIAH/Houston and KRCW-TV/Portland, Oregon.

Tribune Company president and CEO Peter Liguori said in a May 2014 discussion at the MoffettNathanson Media & Communications Summit that he was "not pleased with where the CW is [in regards to its ratings performance]", stating that the network "should not program to [young] people who don't watch [conventional] television". Liguori also stated that he would consider collaborating with the network in regards to improving its programming slate, possibly by incorporating programs from the company's Tribune Studios unit (a production division which launched shortly after Liguori was appointed president of Tribune in November 2013) onto the network, as well as having Tribune play a larger role in the CW's management.

Speaking at Goldman Sachs' 23rd Annual Communacopia Conference in September 2014, Les Moonves acknowledged that Tribune had been looking for more input in how the network is programmed and noted that Liguori is a former programmer (having previously served in executive roles at Fox, FX and Discovery Communications), saying that "[Liguori] would like to participate. He has some good ideas. He's part of our team. Will there be some change in how the CW is structured going forward? I don't know." Moonves went on to reiterate that Tribune is "a very important part of [CBS'] future" (considering that Tribune had recently acquired the CBS affiliation for its Indianapolis station and then-CW affiliate WTTV, following disagreements between CBS and longtime affiliate WISH-TV, which would eventually take over the CW affiliation in January 2015, over reverse compensation demands by the network).

In an October 2014 interview with Broadcasting & Cable, Liguori appeared to reverse course on his previous statements and spoke of Tribune's support of the network. Liguori said in a statement, "We are very encouraged by the recent uptick in the CW['s] ratings and the positive critical response to the new primetime lineup. In particular, [CW CEO Mark Pedowitz] has put in place a programming strategy that will help the network appeal to a wider, more inclusive audience, which is important for our stations across the country. We were glad to support the launch of the new shows through editorial and promotional initiatives, and we look forward to more continued collaboration to build upon this momentum."

In January 2016, the CW and Tribune began negotiations on a new affiliation deal, as the original 10-year agreement signed at the network's inception was approaching its end. Complicating matters was the desire by the CW's then-parent companies, CBS and Warner Bros., to stream the network's programming as a standalone pay OTT service. The impasse in negotiations resulted in a months-long standoff between the two groups.

On May 23, 2016, the CW and Tribune announced they had come to a new affiliation agreement. As part of the deal, Tribune's Chicago flagship WGN-TV would leave the network and revert to being an independent station after nearly 21 years of being affiliated with the CW and its predecessor network, the WB. A major factor in this decision was WGN-TV's large use of local sports programming at the time, which led to many pre-emptions of the CW while WGN-TV had to move as many as 30 games a year to another local station in Chicago. The CW affiliation moved to WPWR-TV, a Fox Television Stations-owned MyNetworkTV station. On September 19, 2019, Tribune Media was acquired by Nexstar Media Group.

==== Roberts Broadcasting bankruptcy ====
Roberts Broadcasting filed for Chapter 11 bankruptcy protection on October 7, 2011; the company cited the loss of the UPN affiliations on its stations in St. Louis (WRBU), Columbia, South Carolina (WZRB) and Jackson, Mississippi (WRBJ-TV) when that network shut down in favor of the CW in 2006, as much of UPN's programming consisted of minority-targeted programs that Roberts felt were compatible with their stations' target audiences (though the stations have since recovered from this setback; additionally, its station in Evansville, Indiana, WAZE-TV, had instead affiliated with the WB prior to 2006, as it was owned by South Central Communications until February 2007). The company had also been hit with lawsuits from Warner Bros. Television, Twentieth Television and CBS Television Distribution over its failure to pay fees for syndicated programming; Roberts eventually settled with Twentieth but lost the Warner Bros. and CBS cases.

On March 24, 2011, the Federal Communications Commission (FCC) canceled WAZE's license for Roberts' failure to construct its digital transmitter facilities. However, the station continued to broadcast via its three-station analog translator network.

On February 20, 2012, Roberts Broadcasting announced that it was exploring the possibility of selling one or all four of its television stations in order to raise enough cash to pay off its creditors. On October 22, 2012, Roberts announced that it had sold WRBJ to the Trinity Broadcasting Network; the deal was approved by a bankruptcy court on January 17, 2013, with TBN officially taking over operational control of WRBJ five months later on May 24 The CW returned to the Jackson market on the second digital subchannel of CBS affiliate WJTV in September 2013. On January 3, 2013, the repeater network of WAZE ceased operations; later that month on January 28, independent station WTVW hurriedly joined the CW, in order to maintain the network in the Evansville area.

On December 2, 2013, Roberts filed to sell WZRB to Radiant Light Ministries, a subsidiary of Tri-State Christian Television, for $2 million. On December 4, Roberts also filed to sell WRBU to TCT for $5.5 million. However, on December 11, the United States bankruptcy court gave initial approval for a plan by Roberts's creditors to instead transfer WRBU, WZRB and the WAZE repeaters to a trust with Ion Media Networks (a creditor in Roberts's chapter 11 bankruptcy proceedings) as its beneficiary, with Roberts' attorney subsequently stating that Ion would purchase the stations for $7.75 million. Roberts had earlier proposed an alternate plan that would have had only the WAZE repeaters be transferred to the trust, which would have allowed the sale of WRBU and WZRB to TCT. The CW affiliation in Columbia moved to WKTC (with MyNetworkTV, which the station had already been affiliated with, being relegated to a secondary affiliation) in March 2014, after temporarily remaining on WZRB after its conversion into an Ion Television O&O the previous month. Ion Media later chose to wind down the ex-WAZE-TV translator network entirely and instead affiliate with Nexstar's WTVW-DT4 (itself a CW affiliate on its main channel) by 2017.

==== Carriage dispute with DirecTV ====
In July 2023, Nexstar implemented a blackout of the CW, along with its affiliates for other major broadcast networks, on DirecTV, DirecTV Stream, and U-verse TV, causing DirecTV to complain to the FCC. In return, Nexstar stated that their streaming agreement with DirecTV had expired in November 2022 and it was illegally streaming content on DirecTV Stream from the CW. In August 2023, Nexstar reached a renewal agreement with Sinclair Broadcast Group for 35 markets, including restoring broadcasting of the CW on DirecTV Stream in 21 markets. Nexstar and DirecTV signed a new multi-year agreement on September 17, 2023, allowing the latter to resume broadcasting and streaming the CW.

==== Paramount's withdrawal and affiliation realignment ====
As part of the sale to Nexstar, Paramount Global's CBS News and Stations subsidiary was granted the right to withdraw its eight affiliates from the network—in Atlanta, Detroit, Philadelphia, Pittsburgh, Sacramento, San Francisco, Seattle and the Tampa Bay area—which was exercised on May 5, 2023, effective September 1, 2023. In some of the affected markets, Nexstar-owned stations were announced as replacements. The remainder of the affected markets were addressed through new affiliation agreements with group owners Hearst Television, Gray Television, The E.W. Scripps Company and Sinclair Broadcast Group, each of which already owned multiple CW affiliates. Nexstar also began reclaiming the network affiliation in other markets where it operated, including Oklahoma City; Billings, Montana; Grand Rapids, Michigan; Panama City, Florida; and Sioux Falls, South Dakota.

The situation of the CW in the Detroit market after the CBS withdrawal was tenuous for several months. Mission Broadcasting, a company that contracts with Nexstar for the operational services of its stations, agreed to purchase WADL from Adell Broadcasting Corporation in a deal that provided for Nexstar to supply many of its operating functions. In addition, WADL became the new CW affiliate in Detroit while the deal was pending. The acquisition stalled at the FCC over objections concerning the relationship between Mission and Nexstar. As a result, Adell Broadcasting removed CW programming from the station on October 30, 2023; the network's programs reappeared on Scripps-owned WMYD on November 13, 2023. The acquisition of WADL by Mission was called off in May 2024, despite the purchase being approved by the FCC a month prior.

On April 19, 2024, Nexstar announced that the CW would not renew its affiliations with the seven E.W. Scripps Company-owned stations—in Norfolk, Lafayette, Detroit, Miami, Tucson, Corpus Christi, and San Luis Obispo—that still carried the network. Nexstar concurrently announced that the CW would move to its own stations in Norfolk and Lafayette effective September 1, 2024; the move would also end WMYD's brief affiliation with the network. On May 1, 2024, it was announced that the CW would move back to its original Chicago station affiliate, WGN-TV (Channel 9), beginning September 1, 2024.

==== Carriage dispute with Optimum ====
On January 10, 2025, Nexstar implemented a blackout of 63 of its local stations and NewsNation on Optimum, with the CW's flagship station WPIX being a major part of the dispute. Nexstar accused Optimum's owner Altice USA of making irrational demands for special terms during contract negotiations, while Altice in return accused it of demanding excessive rates for its programming and forcing it to carry unpopular channels like NewsNation. The two reached a carriage agreement on January 18, allowing Nexstar programming to be restored on Optimum.

=== Owned-and-operated stations ===
CW stations owned by Nexstar Media Group, Mission Broadcasting, or Vaughn Media are considered O&O stations, with nearly 80 stations in markets as high as New York City, Los Angeles, Chicago, and Philadelphia, to lower markets such as Terre Haute, Indiana, Wichita Falls, Texas, Utica, New York, and Evansville, Indiana.

==== Current owned-and-operated stations ====
| Market(s) | State | Station | Channel Number (VC) |
|---|---|---|---|
| Birmingham – Tuscaloosa | Alabama | WIAT | 42 |
| Florence – Huntsville – Decatur | Alabama | WHDF | 15 |
| Gulf Shores – Mobile | Alabama | WFNA | 55 |
| Prescott | Arizona | KAZT-TV | 7 |
| Phoenix | Arizona | KAZT-CD | 7 |
| Tucson | Arizona | KTTU-TV | 18 |
| Pine Bluff – Little Rock | Arkansas | KASN | 38 |
| Bakersfield | California | KGET-TV | 17.2 |
| Los Angeles | California | KTLA | 5 |
| San Diego | California | KUSI-TV | 51 |
| San Francisco – Oakland – San Jose | California | KRON-TV | 4 |
| Colorado Springs – Pueblo | Colorado | KXRM-TV | 21.2 |
| Colorado Springs – Pueblo | Colorado | KXTU-LD | 57 |
| Denver | Colorado | KWGN-TV | 2 |
| Waterbury – Hartford – New Haven | Connecticut | WCCT-TV | 20 |
| Washington | District of Columbia | WDCW | 50 |
| Panama City | Florida | WMBB | 13.2 |
| Tampa – St. Petersburg | Florida | WTTA | 38 |
| Augusta | Georgia | WJBF | 6.3 |
| Macon | Georgia | WMAZ-TV | 13.2 |
| Savannah | Georgia | WSAV-TV | 3.2 |
| Hilo | Hawaii | KHAW-TV | 11.2 |
| Honolulu | Hawaii | KHON-TV | 2.2 |
| Wailuku | Hawaii | KAII-TV | 7.2 |
| Chicago | Illinois | WGN-TV | 9 |
| Evansville | Indiana | WTVW | 7 |
| Terre Haute | Indiana | WTWO | 2.2 |
| Ames – Des Moines | Iowa | KCWI-TV | 23 |
| Burlington – Davenport – Bettendorf | Iowa | KGCW | 26 |
| Topeka | Kansas | KTKA-TV | 49.3 |
| Baton Rouge | Louisiana | WBRL-CD | 21 |
| Baton Rouge | Louisiana | WGMB-TV | 44.2 |
| Lafayette | Louisiana | KLFY-TV | 10.2 |
| New Orleans | Louisiana | WNOL-TV | 38 |
| West Monroe – Monroe | Louisiana | KARD | 14.2 |
| Springfield – Holyoke | Massachusetts | WWLP | 22.2 |
| Springfield – Holyoke | Massachusetts | WFXQ-CD | 28.2 |
| Battle Creek – Kalamazoo – Grand Rapids | Michigan | WOTV | 41.2 |
| Lansing – Jackson | Michigan | WLAJ | 53.2 |
| Hattiesburg – Laurel | Mississippi | WHLT | 22.2 |
| Jackson | Mississippi | WJTV | 12 |
| St. Louis | Missouri | KPLR-TV | 11 |
| Billings | Montana | KSVI | 6.2 |
| Albuquerque | New Mexico | KWBQ | 19 |
| Roswell | New Mexico | KRWB-TV | 21 |
| Buffalo | New York | WNLO | 23 |
| Elmira – Corning | New York | WETM-TV | 18.2 |
| New York City | New York | WPIX | 11 |
| Utica – Rome | New York | WFXV | 33.2 |
| Watertown | New York | WWTI | 50.2 |
| Charlotte | North Carolina | WMYT-TV | 55 |
| Greenville – Washington – New Bern – Jacksonville | North Carolina | WNCT-TV | 9.2 |
| Bismarck – Mandan | North Dakota | KXMB-TV | 12 |
| Dickinson | North Dakota | KXMA | 2 |
| Minot | North Dakota | KXMC-TV | 13 |
| Williston | North Dakota | KXMD-TV | 11 |
| Akron – Cleveland | Ohio | WBNX-TV | 55 |
| Springfield – Dayton | Ohio | WBDT | 26 |
| Oklahoma City | Oklahoma | KAUT-TV | 43 |
| Salem – Portland | Oregon | KRCW-TV | 32 |
| Erie | Pennsylvania | WJET-TV | 24.2 |
| Philadelphia | Pennsylvania | WPHL-TV | 17 |
| Providence | Rhode Island | WNAC-TV | 64.2 |
| Charleston | South Carolina | WCBD-TV | 2.2 |
| Greenville – Spartanburg – Anderson | South Carolina | WYCW | 62 |
| Greenville – Spartanburg – Anderson | South Carolina | WSPA-TV | 7 |
| Florence | South Dakota | KDLO-TV | 3.4 |
| Pierre | South Dakota | KPLO-TV | 6.4 |
| Rapid City | South Dakota | KCLO-TV | 15 |
| Sioux Falls | South Dakota | KELO-TV | 11.4 |
| Memphis | Tennessee | WLMT | 30 |
| Austin | Texas | KNVA | 54 |
| Dallas – Fort Worth | Texas | KDAF | 33 |
| Houston | Texas | KIAH | 39 |
| Nacogdoches – Lufkin – Tyler – Longview – Jacksonville | Texas | KYTX | 19.2 |
| Rio Grande Valley | Texas | KGBT-TV | 4 |
| Wichita Falls | Texas | KFDX-TV | 3.3 |
| Salt Lake City | Utah | KUCW | 30 |
| Roanoke – Lynchburg | Virginia | WWCW | 21 |
| Roanoke – Lynchburg | Virginia | WFXR | 27.2 |
| Virginia Beach – Norfolk – Hampton | Virginia | WVBT | 43.2 |
| Spokane | Washington | KSKN | 22 |

==== Former owned-and-operated stations ====
| City of license/Market | Station | Years owned | Current ownership status |
|---|---|---|---|
| Atlanta, Georgia | WUPA 69 | 2006–2022 | CBS O&O station owned by CBS News and Stations |
| Norfolk, Virginia - Hampton Roads | WGNT 27 | 2006–2010 | Independent station owned by E. W. Scripps Company |
| Philadelphia, Pennsylvania | WPSG 57 | 2006–2022 | Independent station owned by CBS News and Stations |
| Jeannette - Pittsburgh, Pennsylvania | WPCW 19 | 2006–2022 | Independent station, WPKD-TV owned by CBS News and Stations |
| Providence, Rhode Island | WLWC 28 | 2006–2007 | Court TV affiliate owned by Inyo Broadcast Holdings (CW programming rights transferred to WNAC-DT2 in 2016 spectrum auction) |
| Sacramento - Stockton - Modesto, California | KMAX-TV 31 | 2006–2022 | Independent station owned by CBS News and Stations |
| San Francisco - Oakland - San Jose, California | KBCW 44 | 2006–2022 | Independent station, KPYX owned by CBS News and Stations |
| Seattle - Tacoma, Washington | KSTW 11 | 2006–2022 | Independent station owned by CBS News and Stations |
| Tampa - St. Petersburg - Sarasota, Florida | WTOG 44 | 2006–2022 | Independent station owned by CBS News and Stations |
| West Palm Beach, Florida | WTVX 34 | 2006–2007 | CW affiliate owned by Sinclair Broadcast Group |

== Related services ==
=== Video-on-demand services ===
The CW provides video on demand access for delayed viewing of full episodes of the network's programming through various means, including via its website at CWTV.com and its mobile apps for iOS and Android devices (with programs streamable over Wi-Fi and cellular networks), a traditional VOD service—the CW on Demand—that is available on most traditional cable and IPTV providers, and through content deals with Hulu, iTunes and Netflix.

In January 2007, the CW began streaming full-length episodes of several of its programs on the CWTV.com website. The most recent episodes of the network's shows are usually made available on the CW app and the CW on Demand the day after their original broadcast. Due to restrictions imposed through its deal with the streaming service, streaming of the most recent episode of any CW program on Hulu is restricted until eight days after their initial broadcast, in order to encourage live or same-week (via both DVR and cable on-demand) viewing, with day-after-air streaming on either service limited to subscribers of Hulu's subscription service. The CW previously imposed a three-day delay after an episode's original airdate before making its programs available on its website and through the Hulu subscription service (originally called Hulu Plus). However, changes implemented by the network on March 15, 2012, to reduce copyright infringement of its programming content through illegal streaming and downloading internet platforms resulted in that delay being reduced to eight hours after a program's original airing through both services.

In October 2011, the network entered into digital distribution deals with streaming services Netflix and Hulu. The four-year Netflix agreement allowed its customers to instantly watch more than 700 hours of previous seasons of the CW's then-current scripted series, while Hulu signed a five-year deal, giving the streaming site access to next-day content from four of the five major networks (except for CW sister network CBS). The Netflix deal was estimated to be worth $1 billion, providing a much needed lifeline to the money-losing CW network and solidified its future as a valuable asset for then-co-owners CBS and Warner Bros. The Netflix deal was renewed in 2016, updated to allow the streaming service to provide entire seasons of CW shows a week after their airing. The Hulu deal was discontinued at this time. In 2019, the CW and Netflix opted not to renew the deal. The respective studios of CW shows would instead sell to streaming services individually. Beginning in 2020, WarnerMedia streaming service HBO Max (later rebranded to Max under Warner Bros. Discovery) would be the exclusive streaming home for Warners-produced CW shows.

On October 24, 2012, the CW entered into its first video-on-demand distribution deal with a pay television provider through an agreement with Comcast that allows customers to watch the four most-recent episodes of the network's primetime shows on the cable provider's Xfinity On Demand service, along with next-day episode content. The CW On Demand, which is accessible to subscribers at no additional charge, debuted on Comcast Xfinity systems nationwide on October 25, 2012.

Since 2024, the CW has operated a pair of free ad-supported streaming television channels, The CW Gold and The CW Forever, featuring archival content.

=== High-definition feed ===
The CW's master feed is transmitted in 1080i high definition with 5.1 surround sound. All transmission of the network's programming moved to the format in June 2012, with the network's prime time lineup being presented in HD since March 2012 (when America's Next Top Model became the final CW program to convert to the format), with the exception of certain specials produced prior to that point (such as Grandma Got Run Over by a Reindeer, a holiday special carried over to the network from the WB) and select movie presentations. The network's Saturday morning E/I block, One Magnificent Morning, is also broadcast in HD, with the final SD program, the two-season daytime talk show The Robert Irvine Show converting to the format for its second and final season in September 2017 (and in turn ending U.S. broadcast television's standard definition age).

The network is available in HD on most of its full-power affiliates, while availability of high definition content on subchannel-only or cable-exclusive affiliates varies by market; in some of these cases, the over-the-air signal is available only in standard definition (a 16:9 widescreen feed transmitted in 480i SD is presented on some over-the-air affiliates to meet minimum requirements for presentation), with the station offering an exclusive high definition feed to pay television providers. Some affiliates transmit CW programming in 720p HD due to technical considerations if the network is carried on a digital terrestrial subchannel of a station affiliated with another major network or if a primary feed CW affiliate carries more than one subchannel. Since June 2012, the CW Plus feed is also transmitted in HD, and the network has asked those affiliates to carry it in high definition wherever possible. With CBS beginning to use 16:9 framing for all of their graphics on September 24, 2018, the CW was the last major network that continued to use 4:3 framing for all graphics, before switching to the 16:9 framing for all of their graphics in August 2020.

=== CW Seed ===
CW Seed (originally called CWD or the CW Digital Studio) is a production arm that provided original content created exclusively for digital platforms focused in the areas of animation, game shows, comedy, and digital personalities. Previously existing as a section on the CW's main website, CW Seed was spun-off to a separate domain in 2013 as a streaming platform. The free media app became available on several devices, including Roku and Amazon Fire TV.

CW Seed produced various web series, including Vixen, Freedom Fighters: The Ray, and Constantine: City of Demons. On January 8, 2020, CW Seed acquired U.S. streaming rights to 14 series from BBC Studios. In September 2020, the platform added over 300 hours of programming with additional seasons for existing shows and new series, such as 90210, Lost Girl, Nikita, and XIII: The Conspiracy. The CW Seed app and website were reabsorbed into the CW's in April 2022.
