= Saint Anthony, North Dakota =

- Unincorporated town
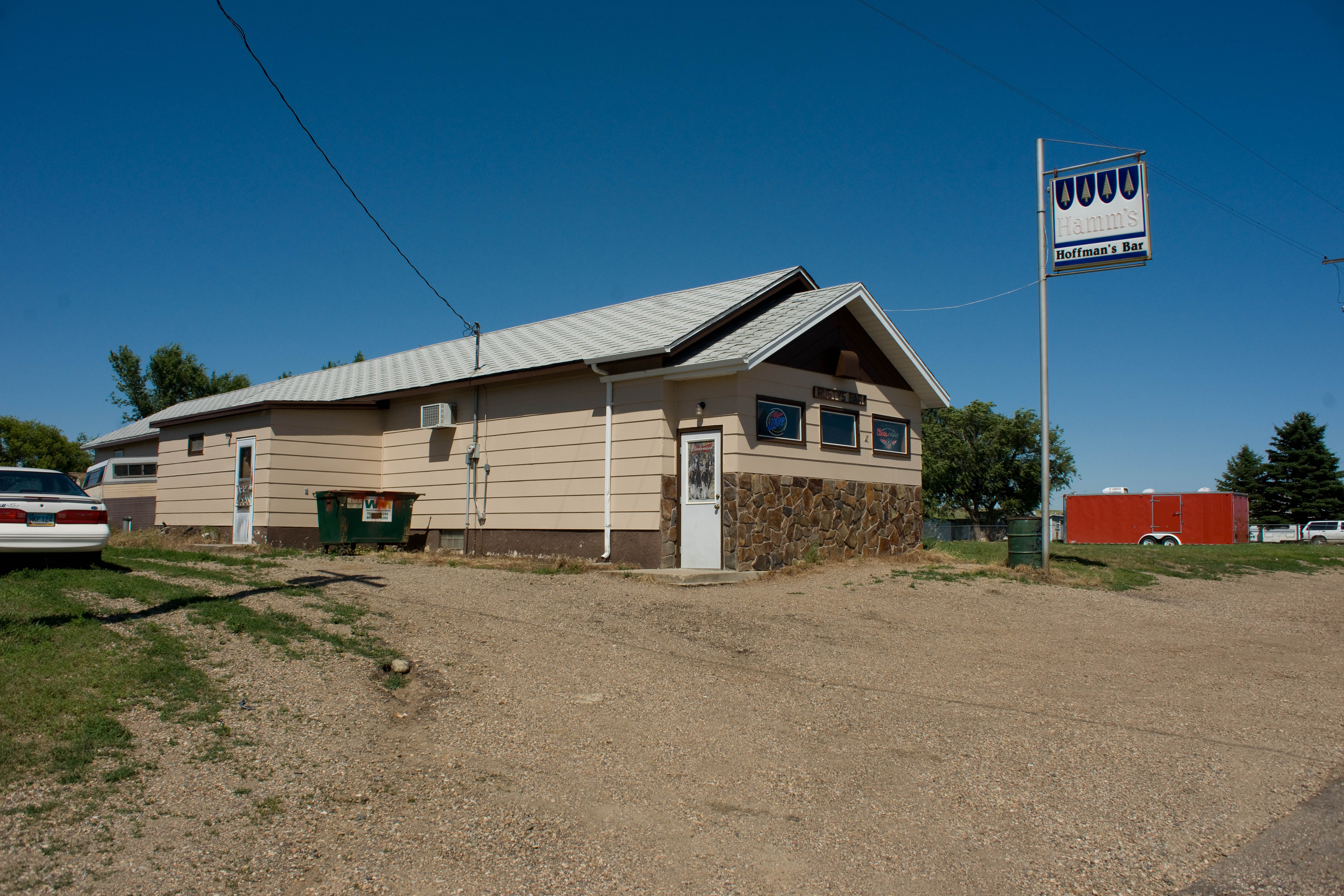

- Location within North Dakota Location within the United States
- Coordinates: 46°37′01″N 100°54′47″W
- Country: United States
- State: North Dakota
- County: Morton
- Elevation: 1,801 ft (549 m)
- Time zone: UTC-6 (Central (CST))
  - Summer (DST): UTC-5 (CDT)
- ZIP Code: 58566
- Area code: 701
- GNIS feature ID: 1031088

Saint Anthony is an unincorporated town in southeastern Morton County, North Dakota, United States. It lies a short distance to the west of North Dakota Highway 6, south of the city of Mandan, the county seat of Morton County. It has the ZIP code 58566. In 2018, the population was estimated to be less than 30.

The community is near the site of several transmitter towers of Bismarck broadcast television and radio stations.

== History ==
The first settlement at St. Anthony was made in 1887 by a colony of German Catholics. A post office called Saint Anthony was established in 1902, and remained in operation until 1991. As of 2018, a restored school and church still remain at the townsite, as well as a newly built restaurant, Rusty's Saloon and Grill, taking the place of the former Hoffman's Bar.

== Notable residents ==
- Steve Tomac, former professional rodeo clown and former North Dakota state senator and state representative.

== Climate ==
This climatic region is typified by large seasonal temperature differences, with warm to hot (and often humid) summers and cold (sometimes severely cold) winters. According to the Köppen Climate Classification system, Saint Anthony has a humid continental climate, abbreviated "Dfb" on climate maps.
