= KX Television =

Television station group in North Dakota

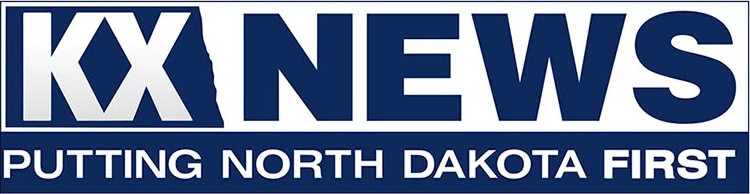
The current logo for Nexstar's "KX" network, as of 2026. The blue outline is an abstraction of North Dakota's map outline.

KX Television, sometimes branded as KX Net or simply KX, is a group of four television stations in western North Dakota owned by the Nexstar Media Group and airing programming from the Nexstar-owned CW and Antenna TV networks.

== Stations ==
The network consists of four stations:

Call sign	Virtual channel	Digital channel	Location
KXMA-TV	2	19	Dickinson, ND
KXMB-TV	12	12	Bismarck, ND
KXMC-TV	13	13	Minot, ND
KXMD-TV	11	14	Williston, ND

The group was formed in 1958 when John Boler, owner of primary CBS affiliate KBMB-TV in Bismarck (founded in 1955), sold a half-interest in his station to Minot businessman Chester Reiten. Boler and Reiten then teamed up to buy North Dakota's oldest station, KCJB-TV in Minot (founded in 1953), and changed its call letters to KXMC-TV. The two stations formed a mini-network, with KXMC as the flagship station even though KBMB was the larger station. A year later, KBMB changed its calls to KXMB.

KXMD in Williston signed on in 1969. Two years later, Boler sold his stake in the stations to Reiten.

The network was partially completed in 1970, when KDIX-TV in Dickinson began switching to and from KXMB's signal whenever CBS programming aired, as KDIX-TV could not afford a network feed. This arrangement continued after KDIX-TV was sold to new owners and changed its call letters to KNDX. When KNDX was on the verge of closure in late 1984, Reiten bought the station, changed its calls to KXMA, and merged it fully into the KX network.

The stations carried a secondary affiliation with ABC until KBMY signed on in 1985.

Chester Reiten retired in the 1990s and turned over his interest in the stations to his five children: Steve Reiten, David Reiten, Kathleen Reiten Hruby, Tim Reiten, and Melanie Reiten Shonkwiler. Master control and internal operations were moved to Bismarck sometime in the 2000s. David Reiten served as KXMC's general manager. Tim Reiten served as company president and KXMB's general manager.

KXMB and KXMC are the two full-fledged stations in the group. KXMB covers the southern portion of the market while KXMC covers the northern portion. For many years, KXMA placed local inserts into KXMB's newscasts, while KXMD placed inserts into KXMC's newscasts. However, recent cutbacks have resulted in all operations being merged in Bismarck and Minot, with KXMA and KXMD being reduced to local bureaus, and as a result, local inserts have been eliminated. However, all four stations continue to air separate identifications and commercials. Starting in 2009, KXMA and KXMD began simulcasting KBMY on their digital subcarriers as part of a sales agreement with KBMY's owner, Forum Communications.

Nexstar Broadcasting Group announced that it would merge with Reiten Television in a $44 million deal on September 17, 2015–a handsome return on Chester Reiten's original investment in KXMB-TV 57 years earlier. The sale was completed on February 2, 2016. As result of the acquisition, Nexstar terminated KX Television's agreements with KBMY.

Nexstar signed an affiliation deal with The CW on July 1, 2016, bringing the network to the KX stations.

For years, the stations used the slogan Your Eye on Dakota, an allusion to the CBS Eyemark logo. Around 2020, the branding changed to Putting North Dakota First.

KX Television lost the CBS affiliation to KBMY and KMCY on August 1, 2026. KBMY–KMCY was one of two Forum-owned stations receiving CBS from Nexstar-owned stations in their markets.

=== Former semi-satellites ===
KXJB formerly provided limited simulcasts of KXMB's programming from 1954 until 1971.

Station	Channels (Digital)	City of license/market	Information
KXJB	4 / 27	Fargo	KXJB only carried limited simulcasts of KXMB's programming from 1954 to 1971. During its first year as a KX Television semi-satellite, KXJB shared a secondary ABC affiliation with NBC affiliate WDAY-TV, ending when KVLY-TV signed on in 1959 (WDAY exclusively affiliated with NBC and KVLY exclusively affiliated with ABC at that point).
