= KXMD-TV =

Television station in Williston, North Dakota

Semi-satellite of KXMC-TV, Minot, North Dakota
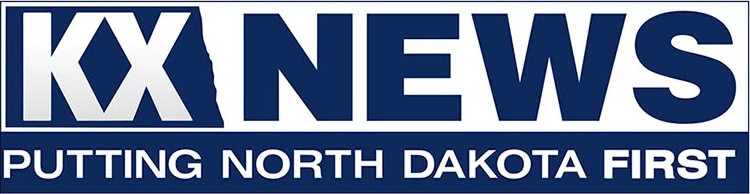

- Williston, North Dakota; United States
- Channels: Digital: 14 (UHF); Virtual: 11
- Branding: KX Television; Dakota's CW; KX News

Programming
- Network: KX Television
- Affiliations: 11.1: The CW; for others, see § Subchannels

Ownership
- Owner: Nexstar Media Group; (Nexstar Media Inc.)
- Sister stations: KXMC-TV, KXMB-TV, KXMA-TV

History
- First air date: October 25, 1969
- Former channel numbers: Analog: 11 (VHF, 1969–2009)
- Former affiliations: CBS (1969–2026); ABC (secondary, 1969–1986)
- Call sign meaning: KX Television Montana and North Dakota

Technical information
- Licensing authority: FCC
- Facility ID: 55683
- ERP: 100 kW
- HAAT: 257 m (843 ft)
- Transmitter coordinates: 48°8′30″N 103°53′36″W

Links
- Public license information: Public file; LMS
- Website: www.kxnet.com

KXMD-TV (channel 11) is a television station in Williston, North Dakota, United States, airing programming from The CW. Owned by Nexstar Media Group, KXMD-TV maintains a news bureau and advertising sales office at the intersection of 13th Avenue West and 18th Street West (near US 2/85) in Williston, and its transmitter is located west of the city near the North Dakota–Montana border.

KXMD is part of the KX Television regional network of CW stations in central and western North Dakota, originating from flagship station KXMB-TV (channel 12) in Bismarck. The KX network relays CW network and other programming across central and western North Dakota, as well as bordering counties in Montana and South Dakota. Master control and some internal operations of KXMD are based at KXMB's facilities on North 15th Street in Bismarck. The four stations are counted as a single unit for ratings purposes.

KXMD operates as a semi-satellite of KXMC-TV (channel 13) in Minot. KXMC is itself a semi-satellite of KXMB-TV in Bismarck, which also has semi-satellite KXMA-TV (channel 2) in Dickinson. KXMD identifies itself as a station in its own right, but clears all network and syndicated programming as provided through KXMC. However, KXMD airs separate local commercial inserts and legal identifications. The Montana viewing portion of KXMD's coverage area is within the Mountain Time Zone, and the station's prime time schedule starts at 6 p.m. rather than the usual 7 p.m. for the time zone.

== History ==
KXMD signed on October 25, 1969, as a semi-satellite of CBS affiliate KXMC-TV in Minot. Previously, Williston viewers had to pick up CBS programming on cable from KOOK-TV in Billings, Montana.

John Boler sold his interest in the KX stations to Chester Reiten in 1971. Steve Reiten, Dave Reiten, Kathleen Reiten Hruby, Tim Reiten, and Melanie Reiten Shonkwiler, Chester's children, still owned the stations until 2017 (including KXMA-TV in Dickinson, which he bought in 1985).

The KX stations previously had a secondary affiliation with ABC before full-time ABC affiliate KMCY signed on in 1986. During the late 1950s, the stations were also briefly affiliated with the NTA Film Network.

Until 1986, KXMD was carried by cable systems across neighboring Saskatchewan, even operating a sales office in Saskatoon, as did KUMV and Great Falls ABC station KFBB-TV. These arrangements ended in 1986 when the Canadian cable companies were granted permission to replace the North Dakota signals with network affiliates from Detroit and Toledo, Ohio.

In 2006, the stations began a web portal called KX Net, with each station's website displaying a localized front page. The stations continue to be branded as "KX Television" and as "KX News" on the air, but also use the "KX Net" moniker on the air. KXNet.com combined the previous domains kxma.com, kxmb.com, kxmc.com and kxmd.com under one umbrella. The original domains are still active. KXNet.com won the 2007 Teddy Award for Best Website and the 2007 Eric Severaid Award for best website small market television in a 6 state region.

In October 2007, KXNet.com along with Midkota Solutions launched DakotaPolitics.com, a web site focusing on North Dakota political news coverage. DakotaPolitics featured profile information, voting records and some analysis. DakotaPolitics also launched weekly tracking polls for the 2008 elections. In 2008 KXNet.com became the first web site in North Dakota to deliver a live news broadcast over the Internet when they streamed a 1-hour special coverage of the 2008 Presidential Caucuses from Bismarck.

In July 2008, Reiten Television began a joint agreement to sell television commercial slots on both its existing stations and KMCY, Minot's ABC affiliate owned by Forum Communications Company. KMCY became available in Williston on a full-power signal on KXMD's second digital subchannel in 2009.

Nexstar Broadcasting Group announced its $44 million purchase of the Reiten Television stations, including KXMD-TV, on September 17, 2015. The sale was completed on February 2, 2016. As result of the acquisition, Nexstar decided to terminate the joint sales agreement with KMCY.

KX Television lost the CBS affiliation to KBMY and KMCY on August 1, 2026. KBMY–KMCY was one of two Forum-owned stations receiving CBS from Nexstar-owned stations in their markets.

== News operation ==
KXMC produces local newscasts daily at 6 a.m., noon, 6 p.m. and 10 p.m. KXMC produces a morning show at 6 a.m., KX News Morning, and co-produces a 5 p.m. newscast with KXMB. Both are simulcast on all four stations. All of the local newscasts are broadcast in high definition.

For many years, KXMD placed inserts into KXMC's newscasts. However, recent cutbacks have resulted in KXMD's operations being largely merged with those of KXMC, and local inserts have been eliminated.

== Technical information ==
=== Subchannels ===
The station's signal is multiplexed:

Subchannels of KXMD-TV
Subchannel	Res.	Short name	Programming
11.1	1080i	KXMD-DT	The CW
11.2	720p		Antenna TV
11.3	480i	Laff	Laff
11.4	480i	MYSTERY	Ion Mystery

=== Analog-to-digital conversion ===
KXMD-TV shut down its analog signal, over VHF channel 11, on June 12, 2009, the official date on which full-power television stations in the United States transitioned from analog to digital broadcasts under federal mandate. The station's digital signal remained on its pre-transition UHF channel 14, using virtual channel 11.

=== Translator ===
- K22KY-D Poplar, MT

== See also ==
- KXMA-TV
- KXMB-TV
- KXMC-TV
