= Laff (TV network) =

American digital multicast television network

- Type: Digital multicast television network (Comedy)
- Country: United States
- Affiliates: see list
- Headquarters: Atlanta, Georgia

Programming
- Picture format: 480i (SDTV) 16:9 widescreen

Ownership
- Owner: E. W. Scripps Company
- Parent: Scripps Networks, LLC
- Key people: Jonathan Katz; (president/CEO, Katz Broadcasting)

History
- Founded: January 18, 2015; 11 years ago
- Launched: April 15, 2015; 11 years ago
- Founder: Jonathan Katz

Links
- Website: Laff.com

Laff (legal name: Laff Media, LLC) is an American digital multicast television network headquartered in Atlanta, Georgia and is owned by the Scripps Networks subsidiary of the E. W. Scripps Company. The network specializes in comedy programming, featuring mainly sitcoms from the 1990s through the 2020s.

== History ==
Laff's launch was announced by Katz Broadcasting in January 2015 as having a scheduled launch date of April 15, 2015, coinciding with Tax Day in the United States; the explanation by Katz is that people needed "something to laugh to" on what they deemed one of the most stressful days of the year. The network launched at noon that day; the first program was the film My Mom's New Boyfriend.

Katz announced that television stations owned by ABC Owned Television Stations and 13 E. W. Scripps Company would serve as the network's charter affiliates; the former serving as a replacement for the standard definition feed of the Live Well Network, which with Laff's announcement also began to roll-back to only being carried by ABCOTS stations. On March 13, 2015, Katz Broadcasting announced an affiliation deal with the Cox Media Group to carry Laff on the subchannels of seven of its stations expanding its initial reach to 47% of the country. The following week on March 20, as part of a multi-network affiliation agreement with Katz, the Meredith Corporation announced that it would carry the network on two of its stations. Additional affiliation deals were struck later in the year with Media General, Tribune Media, and Griffin Media.

On February 13, 2015, Laff acquired the syndication rights to five sitcoms. Laff soon signed film rights deals with Disney–ABC Domestic Television, Miramax, and Sony Pictures Television by March 17. Laff made a multi-year deal for five sitcoms with Carsey-Werner Productions in April 2016. Roseanne reruns were removed on May 29, 2018, after Roseanne Barr was fired from the show by ABC (which then continued on as The Conners); both decisions were based on a Roseanne Barr tweet considered racist.

A list of 2019 Nielsen ratings published by Variety indicated that Laff averaged 223,000 viewers in prime time, down 5% from the 2018 average.

The network moved off ABC Owned Television Stations at the beginning of 2021, in favor of new carriage on Scripps' newly-acquired Ion Media stations in place of the now-defunct Qubo, Ion Plus and Ion Shop networks.

In July 2023, the managing company of Laff announced an over-the-top streaming channel counterpart of Laff, called Laff More.

To honor the 10th anniversary of the network's launch, the network unveiled a temporary new digital on-screen graphic logo beginning in April 2025, with the Laff typeface enclosed inside a number 10. They would also air a specially-marked "Special Presentation" of the 2025 Scripps National Spelling Bee, an event run by network owner E.W. Scripps Company, on May 28 and 29, 2025.

== Programming ==
Laff provides comedy programming to owned-and-operated and affiliated stations every day from 6:00 a.m. to 3:00 a.m. Eastern Time, with paid programming filling the remaining vacated hours. Laff's schedule mainly consists of 1980s, 1990s, 2000s, 2010s and 2020s off-network sitcoms. On September 1, 2021, Nexstar launched a direct competitor to Laff, Rewind TV, and the latter network replaced Laff on Nexstar stations (or will in the upcoming months if not immediately possible due to contractual obligations).

=== Movies ===
Laff carries three comedic films throughout Saturday and Sunday evening schedule. Laff also carries one movie throughout during early Monday through Friday Mornings.

=== Current programming ===
- According to Jim
- Bob Hearts Abishola
- The Conners
- Family Feud Favorites
- Home Improvement
- Just for Laughs Gags
- Last Man Standing
- The Middle
- That '70s Show

=== Former programming ===
- 3rd Rock from the Sun
- ALF
- The Bernie Mac Show
- Cybill
- A Different World
- Drew Carey's Improv-A-Ganza
- The Drew Carey Show
- Ellen
- Empty Nest
- Everybody Hates Chris
- Funniest Pets & People
- Grace Under Fire
- Grounded for Life
- How I Met Your Mother
- Life's Funniest Moments
- Man with a Plan
- Men Behaving Badly
- The Millers
- Night Court
- The Odd Couple
- Roseanne
- Saturday Morning LaffBacks
- Spin City
- World's Funniest Videos: Top 10 Countdown

== Affiliates ==
As of 20 July 2022, Laff has 425 current or pending affiliation agreements with television stations in 48 states, plus the District of Columbia, covering 91.3% of the United States.
