= Aecon =

Canadian construction company

Aecon Group Inc.
- Type: Public
- Traded as: TSX: ARE
- Industry: Construction, Infrastructure Development,
- Founded: 1877; 149 years ago, in Hamilton, Ontario
- Headquarters: Toronto, Montreal, Calgary, Vancouver, Canada
- Key people: Jean-Louis Servranckx (President and CEO); John Beck (Founder and Chairman); Ernest Chan & Martina Doyle (General Counsel)
- Number of employees: 10,000+
- Divisions: Aecon Construction; Aecon Concessions
- Website: aecon.com

Aecon Group Inc. is a Canadian construction and infrastructure development company. Aecon delivers integrated solutions to private and public-sector clients through its Construction segment in the Civil, Urban Transportation, Nuclear, Utility and Industrial sectors, and provides project development, financing, investment, management, and operations and maintenance services through its Concessions segment.

Aecon has been involved in the building of some of Canada's landmarks, including the CN Tower, St. Lawrence Seaway, Ontario Highway 407, Vancouver Skytrain, and the Montreal-Trudeau International Airport.

== History ==
Aecon's history began in 1867, when Scottish immigrant Adam Clark started a plumbing and gas fitting business in Hamilton, Ontario. Aecon's predecessor companies include the Foundation Company of Canada, Jackson Lewis, Lockerbie and Hole, Banister Pipelines, Nicholls-Radtke, Pitts Engineering Construction, and Armbro Construction.

As a group, Aecon's origins go back to 1957 to Prefac Concrete of Montreal, a company started by John M. Beck and his parents.

In 2010, Aecon acquired over 500 physical pieces of mining equipment and assets previously owned by Cow Harbour Construction, a large mining and land reclamation contractor located in Alberta's oil sands.

=== Chinese SOE takeover attempt ===
In October 2017, Aecon and CCCC International Holding Limited (CCCCI), the investment arm of the state-owned China Communications Construction Company, announced that they entered into a definitive agreement under which CCCCI would acquire all of the issued and outstanding common shares of Aecon for $20.37 per share in cash, representing an enterprise value of $1.51 billion.

In May 2018, the federal government of Canada blocked the sale, citing national security concerns.

=== Divestment of mining business ===
In November 2018, Aecon announced the closing of a definitive asset purchase agreement to sell substantially all of the assets related to its Contract Mining business to North American Construction Group for $199.1 million in cash.

== Operations ==
In 2013, Aecon reorganized its operating structure into three core segments.

Aecon Infrastructure is responsible for the design and construction of large transportation projects, including airport terminals, highways, hydroelectric dams, subway tunnels and utility corridors. The Infrastructure segment represented 41% of 2012 Revenue.

Aecon Industrial covers a range of services to numerous projects, from new and existing mines to hydroelectric facilities, natural gas power plants, oil and gas facilities, cogeneration plants, and nuclear plants.

Aecon Concessions specializes in the development of domestic and international Public-Private Partnership (P3) projects as well as other infrastructure development projects requiring private finance. The Concessions segment represented 1% of 2012 Revenue.

In October 2024, Aecon Group buys United Engineers & Constructors for US$33 million in order to enhances North American nuclear capability.

== Legal issues ==
In 2017, Aecon Construction and Materials Ltd was found in violation of the Ontario Water Resources Act relating to a construction contract in northern Ontario in 2013. Prior to this, Aecon was fined $225,000 (CAD) in 2011 after being judged liable for a 2008 natural gas explosion that killed a homeowner in an Ontario town. In 2005, they faced a $300,000 (CAD) fine for an earlier gas explosion at a job site in Windsor, Ontario that killed two employees. The company has been accused of misrepresenting the severity of workplace injuries, although in this they were not alone among large Canadian employers, several of which were discovered engaging in similar practices.
