= Foundation Company of Canada =

Canadian construction company (1924–2001)

- Industry: Construction
- Founded: 22 September 1924
- Defunct: 1 January 2001
- Fate: Acquired by Aecon
- Headquarters: Montreal, Quebec

The Foundation Company of Canada Limited was a Canadian construction company that existed from 1924 to 2001. The company's origins lay in New York City, where the Foundation Company was founded in 1902. In 1909, Foundation was invited by the Canadian Pacific Railway to build caissons as part of the construction on Windsor Station in Montreal. Foundation operated in Canada from 1909 until 1924. That year, Richard E. C. Chadwick and a group of investors bought out the company's Canadian operations and incorporated the Foundation Company of Canada Limited. In 1963, a parent company, the Canadian Foundation Company Limited, was formed to hold the Foundation Company of Canada and its subsidiaries.

Foundation was one of Canada's largest construction firms and was responsible for many of the country's most famous structures built in the 20th century, including the CN Tower and Place Ville Marie.

In 1987, the Foundation Company was acquired by Banister Continental Inc. of Edmonton, which became the country's largest publicly traded construction company. Banister Continental – which changed its name to Banister Inc. in 1990, Banister Foundation Inc. in 1994, and BFC Construction in 1997 – continued to operate the Foundation Company as a subsidiary through 1999. In December 1999, BFC Construction was acquired by Armbro Enterprises Inc. On 1 January 2001, Armbro amalgamed Foundation and BFC into a single new company, which brought an end to the Foundation name. In June 2001, Armbro was renamed Aecon Group Inc.

== History ==
=== Origins in New York ===
In the spring of 1902, Edwin Seton Jarrett (1862–1938), Daniel Edward Moran (1864–1937), and Franklin Remington (1865–1955) formed the Foundation Company, incorporated in New York. Jarrett was a graduate of Rensselaer Polytechnic Institute (1889), Moran of Columbia University (1884), and Remington of Harvard University (1887). Soon, the Foundation Company became America's foremost builder of foundations. Among the buildings in New York City for which the Foundation Company built foundations were the Trinity Building, Woolworth Building, Whitehall Building, Singer Building, Bankers' Trust Building, and Municipal Building. The company worked also on bridges, dams, mines, and power plants throughout the country. In 1910, Moran left the company to found his own firm.

=== Early operations in Canada, 1909–1924 ===
In late 1909, the Canadian Pacific Railway hired the Foundation Company to build caissons as part of the construction of Windsor Station in Montreal. Foundation formed a new subsidiary, the Foundation Company Limited, to carry out its Canadian work. The company went on to win the contracts for pier work on the transcontinental Canadian Pacific Railway.

In 1906, Richard Ellard Carden Chadwick (1885–1966) graduated from the University of Toronto with a degree in mechanical engineering. From 1907 to 1909 he worked on staff at the university, and from 1909 to 1911 he worked for the city engineer in Toronto as engineer in charge of bridges and docks. On 1 January 1911, Chadwick joined the Foundation Company in Montreal as superintendent for the Montreal district. He would go on to serve as superintendent for the Winnipeg district, manager and acting chief engineer for the Montreal district, and for a time, acting chief engineer for the parent company in New York.

=== Independent Canadian company, 1924–1962 ===
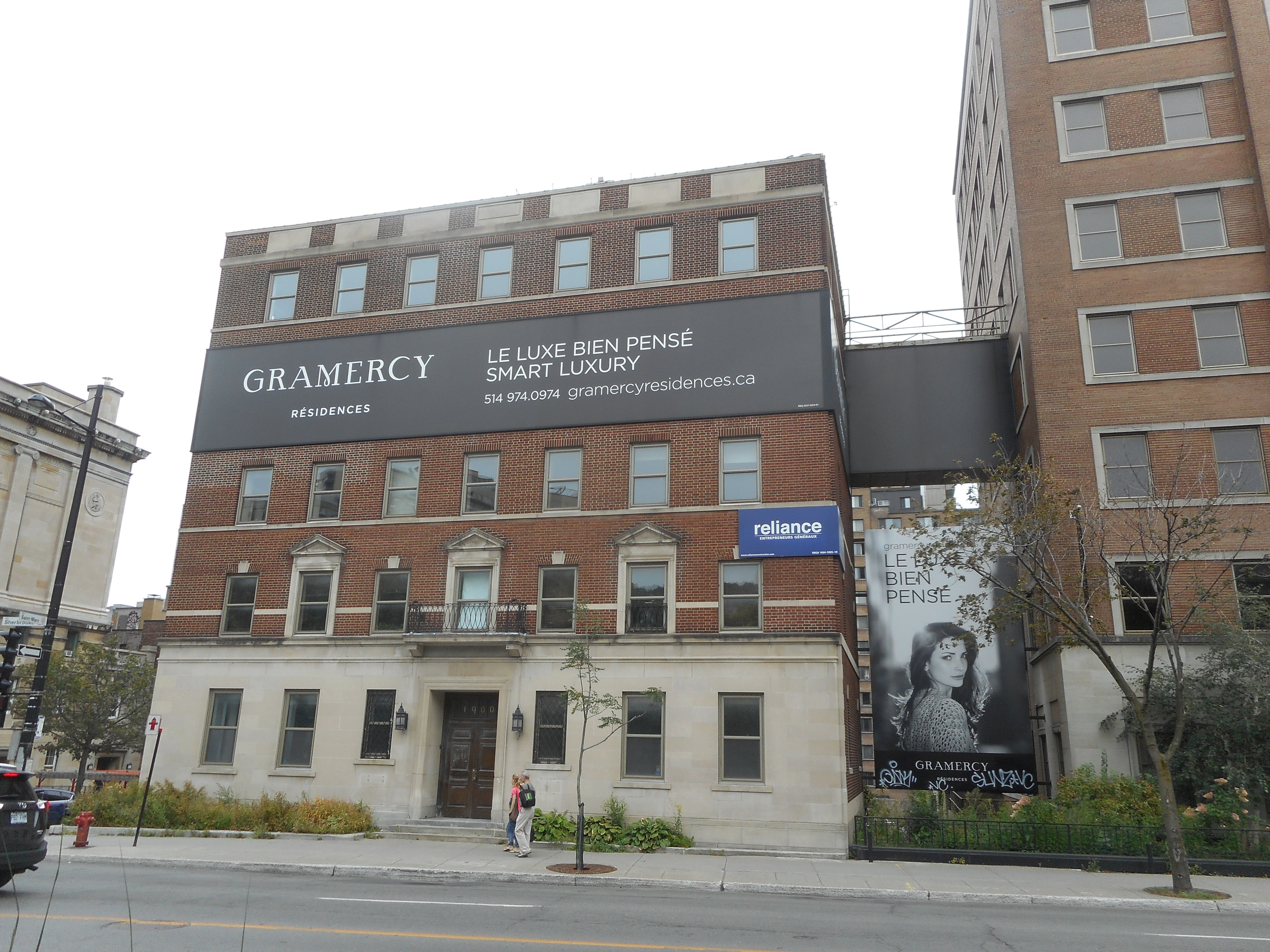
Foundation House, the company's headquarters in Montreal at 1900 rue Sherbrooke, was completed in 1946.

In 1924, Chadwick persuaded the directors of the Foundation Company to form a Canadian subsidiary. Chadwick worked with Montreal financier Victor Montague Drury (1884–1962), the son of Charles William Drury and brother-in-law of Lord Beaverbrook, to raise the capital. On 22 September 1924, the Foundation Company of Canada Limited received its articles of incorporation. The first president was John Williams Doty (1879–1961), an engineer originally from Toronto who was president of the Foundation Company in New York. Chadwick was vice-president and general manager, and Drury was vice-president. The company's directors were A. J. Brown, Franklin Remington, Noah A. Timmins, F. H. Phippen, Ernest-Rémi Décary, W. F. Angus, Frank Quilter, and C. B. McNaught. In 1929, Chadwick and Drury bought out the remaining Canadian assets of the Foundation Company, making the Foundation Company of Canada a wholly independent company. That year, Chadwick assumed the presidency.

Under Chadwick's leadership, Foundation formed several subsidiary companies. These included the Construction Equipment Company Limited (1922), Foundation Maritime Limited (1930), Foundation of Canada Engineering Corporation Limited (1953), and Geocon Limited (1954). In 1952, Chadwick stepped down from the presidency and became the first chairman of the board. The new president was Frederick George Rutley (1890–1981), who held the post until 1958. That year, Rutley succeeded Chadwick as chairman, remaining in office until 1962.

=== Middle years, 1962–1987 ===
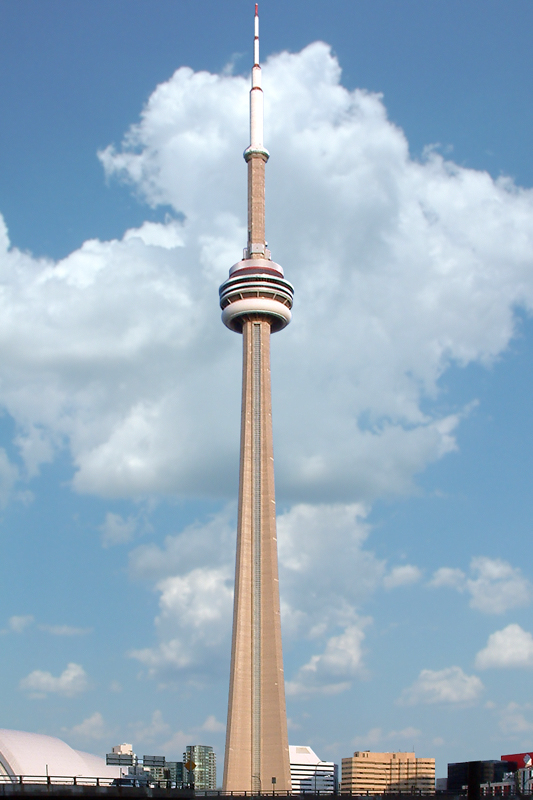
Foundation's crowning achievement was the construction of the CN Tower, which was completed in 1976.

In March 1962, Slater Steel Industries Limited of Hamilton acquired around 500,000 of Foundation's 1,188,816 shares. At Foundation's annual meeting on 26 April 1962, eight Slater nominees were elected to the board. Only five members of the 1961 board were reelected, while nine resigned. The resignations counted much of the company's old guard, including Chadwick, Drury, and Rutley. Robert Fletcher Shaw was appointed president, while Samuel Fingold (1911–1970), chairman and president of Slater, was elected chairman of the board. On 19 April 1963, the company incorporated the Canadian Foundation Company Limited. The new company acquired all shares of the FCC and its subsidiaries and became the parent of the Foundation group of companies. In February 1964, at the request of the federal government, the company released president Shaw to take on the role of deputy commissioner-general of Expo 67. His replacement was Robert Douglas Armstrong (1916–2015). Armstrong remained president only until 1966, when he left to become president of Rio Algom. Calvert Pomeroy Baker (1911–1976) succeeded as president that year.

In 1968, A. Janin & Company of Montreal began acquiring shares of the company, and by the mid-1970s held 96 per cent of Foundation's common shares. At the annual meeting in 1968, the company appointed Henri-François Gautrin president. Janin began selling its shares in 1978, and concluded the sale in early 1980. Half the shares were purchased by the public, while half were acquired by Skanska, a Swedish construction company. Following the sale by Janin, Andrew Gilmour McCaughey (1922–2014) replaced Gautrin temporarily as chairman during the transition period. At the time, McCaughey was chief financial officer of Molson. In 1981, Paul Gábor Opler (1923–1988) became chairman, while Rolf Kindbom was appointed president. Opler remained in the chair until 1984, when McCaughey replaced him. Kindbom, a Swede, had worked for Skanska since 1961.

=== Subsidiary of Banister, 1987–1999 ===
In the spring of 1987, Banister Continental of Edmonton reached an agreement to acquire the Foundation Company. Banister had been founded in Edmonton in 1948 by Ronald Kitchener Banister (1917–1993) as Banister Pipelines, along with a parent company, Banister Construction. In 1969, Banister Construction was acquired by Continental Computer Associates, which changed its name to the Banister Continental Corp. To finance the purchase of Foundation, Banister sold 15 per cent of its own shares to Skanska, and acquired the 52 per cent stake in Foundation. After the sale, Banister operated Foundation as a wholly owned subsidiary. In May 1990, Banister Continental changed its name to Banister Inc., in June 1994 changed its name to Banister Foundation, and in May 1997 changed its name to BFC Construction.

=== Takeover by Armbro (Aecon), 1999–2001 ===
In November 1999, Armbro Enterprises Inc. of Brampton, Ontario, made an all-cash offer to purchase BFC at $12.25 per share. Around $89 million of the $101.5 million used to make the offer came in the form of a loan from Hochtief, which was convertible into equity. Legally, Armbro had been incorporated on 14 January 1957 in Montreal as the Prefac Concrete Company Limited. Its founder was Etienne Beck, whose son John M. Beck later became head of the company. In 1988, Prefac acquired Armbro Construction, and changed its own name to Armbro Enterprises. Shortly after Armbro mailed the offer, the BFC board voted to reject it. In December, the offer was revised to include a ¢75 dividend, bringing the price to $13.00 per share. The BFC board voted to recommend approval of the deal. By late December, Armbro had acquired 95 per cent of BFC shares, and on 13 January 2000, the BFC stock was delisted.

On 1 January 2001, Armbro merged BFC Construction and the Foundation Company, which was still a subsidiary, into a new corporation (no. 385109-5) under the name of the BFC Construction Group Inc. The merger brought the end of the use of the Foundation name. On 18 June 2001, Armbro Enterprises Inc. was renamed Aecon Enterprises Inc., and concurrently, the BFC Construction Group Inc. was renamed the Aecon Construction Group Inc.

== Leadership ==
=== President ===
1. John Williams Doty, 1924–1929
2. Richard Ellard Carden Chadwick, 1929–1952
3. Frederick George Rutley, 1952–1958
4. Lionel James McGowan, 1958–1962
5. Robert Fletcher Shaw, 1962–1964
6. Robert Douglas Armstrong, 1964–1966
7. Calvert Pomeroy Baker, 1966–1968
8. Henri-François Gautrin, 1968–1979
9. Michael Blythe Harding, 1979–1981
10. Rolf Kindbom, 1981–1987

=== Chairman of the Board ===
1. Richard Ellard Carden Chadwick, 1951–1958
2. Frederick George Rutley, 1958–1962
3. Samuel Fingold, 1962–1970
4. Calvert Pomeroy Baker, 1971–1976
5. Henri-François Gautrin, 1979–1980
6. Andrew Gilmour McCaughey, 1980–1981
7. Paul Gábor Opler, 1981–1984
8. Andrew Gilmour McCaughey, 1984–1987
