= Robert Fletcher Shaw =

Canadian engineer (1910–2001)

- Born: 16 February 1910; Montreal, Quebec
- Died: 22 March 2001 (aged 91); Montreal, Quebec
- Education: McGill University (BEng 1933)
- Spouse: Johann Alexandra MacInnes (m. 1935)

Robert Fletcher Shaw CC (16 February 1910 – 22 March 2001) was a Canadian businessman, academic, civil servant and deputy commissioner general of the Universal and International Exhibition of 1967.

Born in Montreal, Quebec, he was raised in Revelstoke, British Columbia. He received a degree in engineering from McGill University in 1933. In 1937 he started as an engineer with the Foundation Company of Canada, rising to become its president.

After Expo, he was vice-principal of administration at McGill University until 1971. He then became Canada's first deputy minister of the environment. In 1975 he became president of the Engineering Institute of Canada. He retired in 1985.

In 1967 he was made a Companion of the Order of Canada.

In 1935 he married Johann MacInnes. Their only son, Robert Jr., a commercial airline pilot, was killed in a plane crash in 1966.
