= Puente de Luz =

Bridge in Toronto, Ontario, Canada

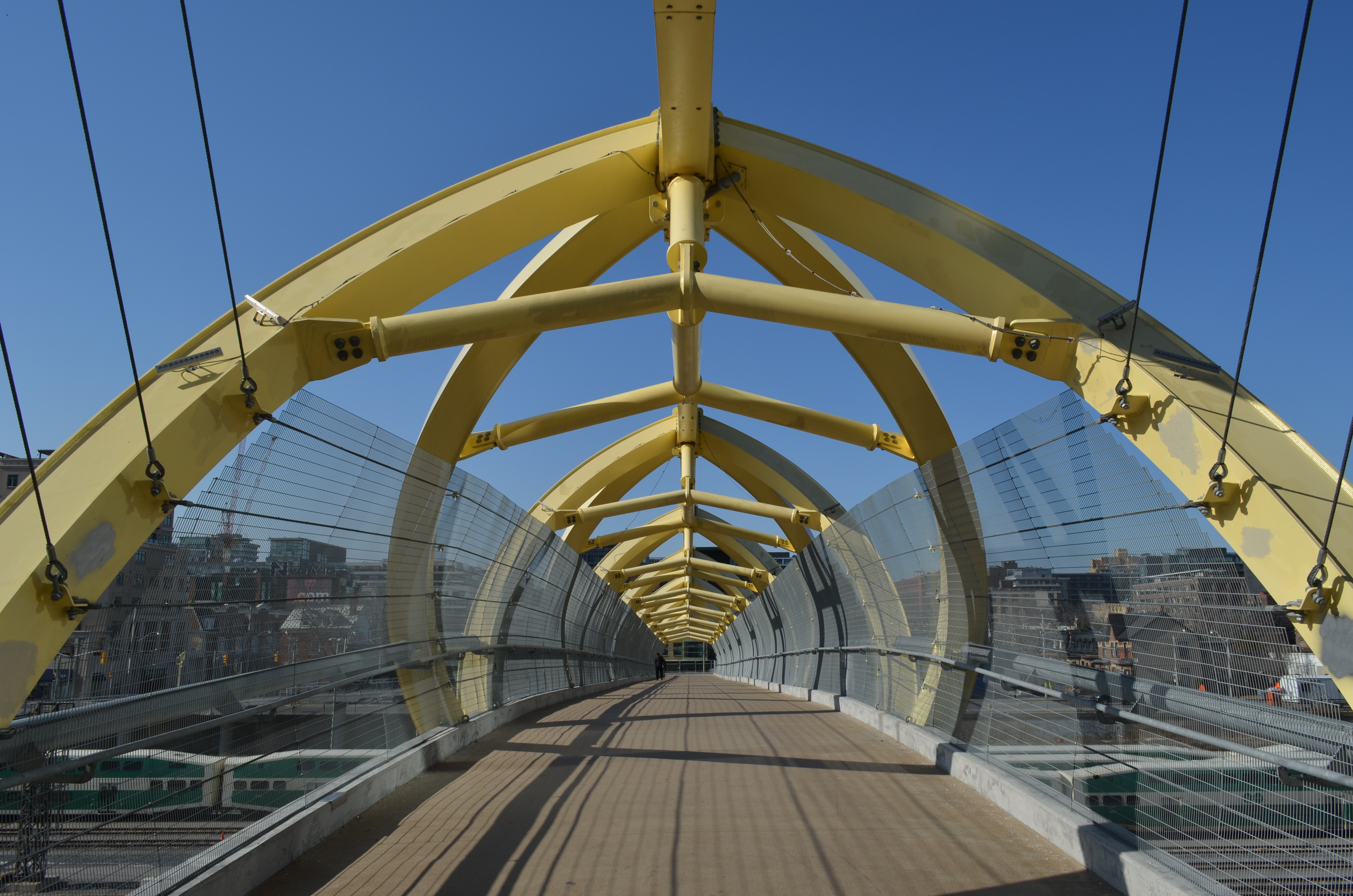
- The bridge in 2014
- Coordinates: 43°38′28″N 79°23′53″W
- Locale: Toronto, Ontario, Canada

History
- Architect: Francisco Gazitúa

Location
- Interactive map of Puente de Luz

Puente de Luz is a bridge in Toronto, Ontario, Canada. The bridge was designed by Chilean artist Francisco Gazitua.
