= History of the world's tallest structures =

Burj Khalifa, in Dubai, is currently the world's tallest building.

This is the history of the world's tallest structures.

== Overall ==
Below is a list of the tallest structures supported by land. For most of the period from around 2667 BC to 1221 AD, the Egyptian pyramids (culminating in the Great Pyramid of Giza) were the tallest structures in the world. From 1221 to 1884 the records were held by European churches, and from 1954 to 2008 they were held by guyed radio or TV masts.

Since 2008, the Burj Khalifa in Dubai has been the tallest structure supported by land, at 829.8 metres (2,722 ft). There are oil platforms supported by the sea which have been of greater length since about 1980, with some examples up to 2,934 metres (9,626 ft). In addition, some countries monitor their borders with tethered aerostats which can rise to 6,096 metres (20,000 ft).

Taller than all past structures (including destroyed structures)

Record from	Record held (years)	Name and location	Constructed	Height (m)	Height (ft)	Coordinates	Notes
c. 9500 BC	1,500	Göbekli Tepe, Turkey	c. 9500 BC	5–6	18	37°13′23″N 38°55′21″E	Possibly one of the earliest known temples.
c. 8000 BC	4,000	Tower of Jericho, West Bank, Palestine	c. 8000 BC	8.5	27.9	31.872041°N 35.443981°E	One of the earliest ever stone monuments.
c. 4000 BC	1,333	Anu ziggurat, Uruk, Iraq	c. 4000 BC	13	40	31°19′28″N 45°38′24.6″E	
c. 2667 BC	57	Pyramid of Djoser, Saqqara, Egypt	c. 2667 BC	62.5	205	29°52′16.53″N 31°12′59.59″E	First Egyptian pyramid, formed of six stacked mastabas.
c. 2610 BC	10	Meidum Pyramid, Egypt	c. 2610 BC	91.65	301	29°23′17″N 31°09′25″E	Shortly after completion Meidum Pyramid collapsed due to bad design/instability and is now 65 m (213 ft).
c. 2600 BC	10	Bent Pyramid, Dahshur, Egypt	c. 2600 BC	104.71	343.5	29°47′25″N 31°12′33″E	Angle of slope decreased during construction to avoid collapse.
c. 2590 BC	20	Red Pyramid of Sneferu, Egypt	c. 2590 BC	105	344.5	29°48′31.39″N 31°12′22.49″E	
c. 2570 BC	3,086 (first run)	Great Pyramid of Giza in Egypt	c. 2570 BC	146.6	481	29°58′44.93″N 31°08′3.09″E	See also 516–534 and 534–1221.
516	18	Yongning Pagoda in Luoyang, China	516	147	482		It was destroyed by a lightning strike in 534. Its exact height is unknown, and estimates range from 137 m (in which case the Great Pyramid of Giza would have kept the record) to 240 m.
534	3,773 (prior 3,086 + new 687)	Great Pyramid of Giza in Egypt	c. 2570 BC	146.6	481	29°58′44.93″N 31°08′3.09″E	See also 2570 BC – 516 and 516 – 534. By 1647, the Great Pyramid's height had decreased to 139 m (456 ft) after its top was removed.
1221	90	Old St Paul's Cathedral in London, England	1087–1666	149	489	51°30′49″N 0°5′54″W	The spire was destroyed by a lightning strike in 1561. Its height is disputed, for example by Christopher Wren (1632–1723), who suggested a height of 140 m (460 ft).
1311	237	Lincoln Cathedral in England	1092–1311	160	525	53°14′3.26″N 0°32′10.54″W	The central spire was destroyed in a storm in 1548. While the reputed height of 525 ft (160 m) is accepted by most sources, others consider it doubtful.
1548	21 (first run)	St. Mary's Church in Stralsund, Germany	1384–1478	151	495	54°18′36.01″N 13°5′14.81″E	See also resumption 1573–1647.
1569	4	Beauvais Cathedral in France	1272–1569	153	502	49.4326°N 2.0814°E	Spire collapsed in 1573; today, the church stands at a height of 67.2 metres (220.5 ft).
1573	95 (prior 21 + new 74)	St. Mary's Church in Stralsund, Germany	1384–1478	151	495	54°18′36.01″N 13°5′14.81″E	See also 1548–1569. The church tower's spire burnt down after a lightning strike in 1647. Today the tower has a dome and stands at a height of 104 m (341 ft).
1647	227	Strasbourg Cathedral in France	1439	142	466	48°34′54.22″N 7°45′1.48″E	By 1647, the Pyramid of Khafre's height had decreased from 143.5 m (471 ft) to 136.4 m (448 ft) after its top was removed.
1874	2	St. Nicholas Church in Hamburg, Germany	1846–1874	147	483	53°32′50.94″N 9°59′26.12″E	The nave was demolished by aerial bombing during World War II; only the spire remains.
1876	4	Cathédrale Notre Dame in Rouen, France	1202–1876	151	495	49°26′24.54″N 1°5′41.85″E	
1880	4	Cologne Cathedral in Germany	1248–1880	157.38	516	50°56′28.10″N 6°57′25.80″E	
1884	5	Washington Monument in Washington, D.C., United States	1848–1888	169.29	555	38°53′22.08″N 77°2′6.89″W	The world's tallest all-stone structure, as well as the tallest obelisk-form structure.
1889	41	Eiffel Tower in Paris, France	1887–1889	312	1,024	48°51′29.77″N 2°17′40.09″E	The addition of a new telecommunications tower in 2022 brought the overall height to 330 m (1,083 ft).
1930	1	Chrysler Building in New York City, United States	1928–1930	319	1,046	40°45′5.78″N 73°58′31.52″W	
1931	23	Empire State Building in New York City, United States	1930–1931	381	1,250	40°44′54.95″N 73°59′8.71″W	First building with 100+ stories. The addition of a pinnacle and antennas later increased its overall height to 448.7 m (1,472 ft). This was subsequently lowered to 443.1 m (1,454 ft).
1954	2	Griffin Television Tower Oklahoma (AKA KWTV Transmission Tower), Oklahoma City, Oklahoma, United States	1954	480.5	1,576	35°32′58.59″N 97°29′50.27″W	
1956	3	KOBR-TV Tower, Caprock, New Mexico, United States	1956	490.7	1,610	33°22′31.31″N 103°46′14.3″W	Collapsed in 1960; rebuilt
1959	1	WGME TV Tower, Raymond, Maine, United States	1959	495	1,624	43°55′28.43″N 70°29′26.72″W	
1960	2	KFVS TV Mast, Cape Girardeau County, Missouri, United States	1960	511.1	1,677	37°25′44.5″N 89°30′13.84″W	
1962	1	WTVM/WRBL-TV & WVRK-FM Tower, Cusseta, Georgia, United States	1962	533	1,749	32°19′25.09″N 84°46′45.07″W	
1963	0	WIMZ-FM-Tower, Knoxville, Tennessee, United States	1963	534.01	1,752	36°08′05.49″N 83°43′28.01″W	
1963	11 (first run)	KVLY-TV mast, Blanchard, North Dakota, United States	1963	628.8	2,063	47°20′31.85″N 97°17′21.13″W	See also resumption 1991–1998 and 1998–2008.
1974	17	Warsaw Radio Mast, Gąbin, Poland	1974	646.4	2,121	52°22′3.74″N 19°48′8.73″E	Mast radiator insulated against ground, collapsed in 1991
1991	18 (prior 11 + new 7 for second run)	KVLY-TV mast, Blanchard, North Dakota, United States	1963	628.8	2,063	47°20′31.85″N 97°17′21.13″W	See also 1963–1974 and 1998–2008.
1998	0	KRDK-TV mast, Galesburg, North Dakota, United States	1966	629	2,064	47°16′45.06″N 97°20′25.68″W	Height includes the 1998 addition of a short flagpole, which was later removed.
1998	28 (prior 18 + new 10)	KVLY-TV mast, Blanchard, North Dakota, United States	1963	628.8	2,063	47°20′31.85″N 97°17′21.13″W	See also 1963–1974 and 1991–1998. 75-foot analog antenna was removed from the top of the structure in 2018 in digital repack construction
2008	18	Burj Khalifa in Dubai, United Arab Emirates	2004–2009	829.8	2,722	25°11′50.0″N 55°16′26.6″E	

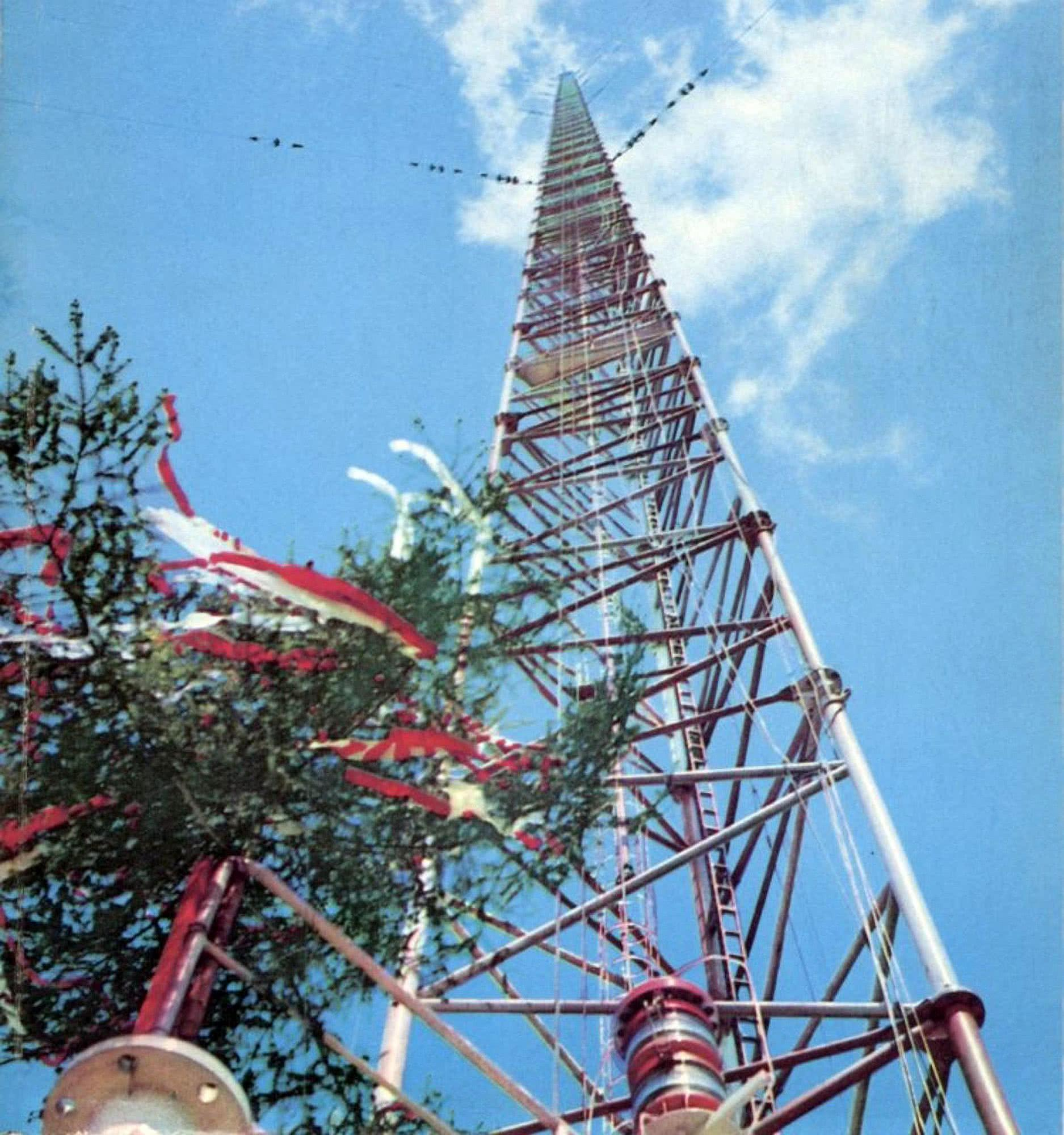
Warsaw radio mast, the height record holder from 1974 to 1991

The Kanishka Stupa near Peshawar, Pakistan was built c. 151 and rebuilt in the 4th century. Ancient travelers claimed it was up to 171 metres (560 feet) tall, which would have been a record at the time. Modern estimates suggest a height of 122 metres (400 feet), which would not have been a record. It was destroyed by lightning.

== Guyed structures ==
Many large guyed masts were destroyed at the end of World War II, so the dates for the years between 1945 and 1950 may be incorrect. If Wusung Radio Tower in China survived World War II, it would have been the tallest guyed structure shortly after World War II.

Record from	Record held (years)	Name and location	Constructed	Height		Coordinates	Notes
Record from	Record held (years)	Name and location	Constructed	m	ft	Coordinates	Notes
1913	7	Central mast of Eilvese transmitter, Eilvese, Germany	1913	250	820	52°31′40″N 9°24′24″E	Mast was divided in 145 m by an insulator, demolished in 1931
1920	3	Central masts of Nauen Transmitter Station, Nauen, Germany	1920	260	853	52°38′56″N 12°54′30″E	2 masts, demolished in 1946
1923	10	Masts of Ruiselede transmitter, Ruiselede, Belgium	1923	287	942	51°4′44″N 3°20′6.9″E?	8 masts, destroyed in 1940
1933	6	Lakihegy Tower, Lakihegy, Hungary	1933	314	1,031	47°22′23.45″N 19°0′17.21″E	Blaw-Knox Tower, insulated against ground, destroyed in 1945; rebuilt
1939	7	Deutschlandsender Herzberg/Elster, Herzberg (Elster), Germany	1939	335	1,099	51°42′59.76″N 13°15′51.5″E	Insulated against ground, dismantled 1946/1947
1946	2	Lakihegy Tower, Lakihegy, Hungary	1946	314	1,031	47°22′23.45″N 19°0′17.21″E	Blaw-Knox Tower, Insulated against ground, rebuilt after destruction in 1945
1948	1	WIVB-TV Tower, Colden, New York, United States	1948	321.9	1,056	42°39′33.19″N 78°37′33.91″W	
1949	1	Longwave transmitter Raszyn, Raszyn, Poland	1949	335	1,099	52°4′21.72″N 20°53′2.15″E	Insulated against ground
1950	4	Forestport Tower, Forestport, New York, United States	1950	371.25	1,218	43°26′41.9″N 75°5′9.55″W	Insulated against ground, demolished
1954	From 1954–2008 guyed masts held the record for tallest structure overall, as seen in the Overall table above.						
1963	11 (first run)	KVLY-TV mast, Blanchard, North Dakota, United States	1963	628.8	2,063	47°20′31.85″N 97°17′21.13″W	See also resumption 1991–1998 and 1998–2008.
1974	17	Warsaw Radio Mast, Gąbin, Poland	1974	646.4	2,121	52°22′3.74″N 19°48′8.73″E	Mast radiator insulated against ground, collapsed in 1991
1991	18 (prior 11 + new 7 for second run)	KVLY-TV mast, Blanchard, North Dakota, United States	1963	628.8	2,063	47°20′31.85″N 97°17′21.13″W	See also 1963–1974 and 1998–2008.
1998	0 (first run)	KRDK-TV mast, Galesburg, North Dakota, United States	1966	629	2,064	47°16′45.06″N 97°20′25.68″W	See also 2018–present. Height includes the 1998 addition of a short flagpole, which was later removed.
1998	38 (prior 18 + new 20)	KVLY-TV mast, Blanchard, North Dakota, United States.	1963	628.8	2,063	47°20′31.85″N 97°17′21.13″W	See also 1963–1974 and 1991–1998. 75-foot analog antenna was removed from the top of the structure in 2018 in digital repack construction
2018	8	KRDK-TV mast, Galesburg, North Dakota, United States	1966	627.8	2,060	47°16′45.06″N 97°20′25.68″W	See also 1998.

== Freestanding structures ==
Freestanding structures must not be supported by guy wires (like guyed masts or partially guyed towers), or built underground or on the seabed and supported by the sea (such as the Petronius Platform). They include towers, chimneys, and skyscrapers (listed based on their pinnacle height). Until 1954, freestanding structures held the record for tallest structures overall, as seen in the Overall table above. Here are the records for freestanding structures after that point:

Record from	Record held (years)	Name and location	Constructed	Height (metres)	Height (feet)	Coordinates	Notes
1931	36	Empire State Building in New York City, United States	1930–1931	381	1,250	40°44′54.95″N 73°59′8.71″W	First building with 100+ stories. The addition of a pinnacle and antennas later increased its overall height to 448.7 m (1,472 ft). This was subsequently lowered to 443.1 m (1,454 ft).
1967	8	Ostankino Tower in Moscow, Soviet Union	1963–1967	540	1,762	55°49′10.94″N 37°36′41.79″E	Remains the tallest in Europe. Fire in 2000 led to extensive renovation.
1975	32	CN Tower in Toronto, Canada	1973–1976	553.33	1,815.39	43°38′33.22″N 79°23′13.41″W	The tallest in the Western Hemisphere.
2007	19	Burj Khalifa in Dubai, United Arab Emirates	2004–2009	829.8	2,722	25°11′50.0″N 55°16′26.6″E	Holder of world's tallest freestanding structure. Topped out at 829.8 m (2,722 ft) in 2009.

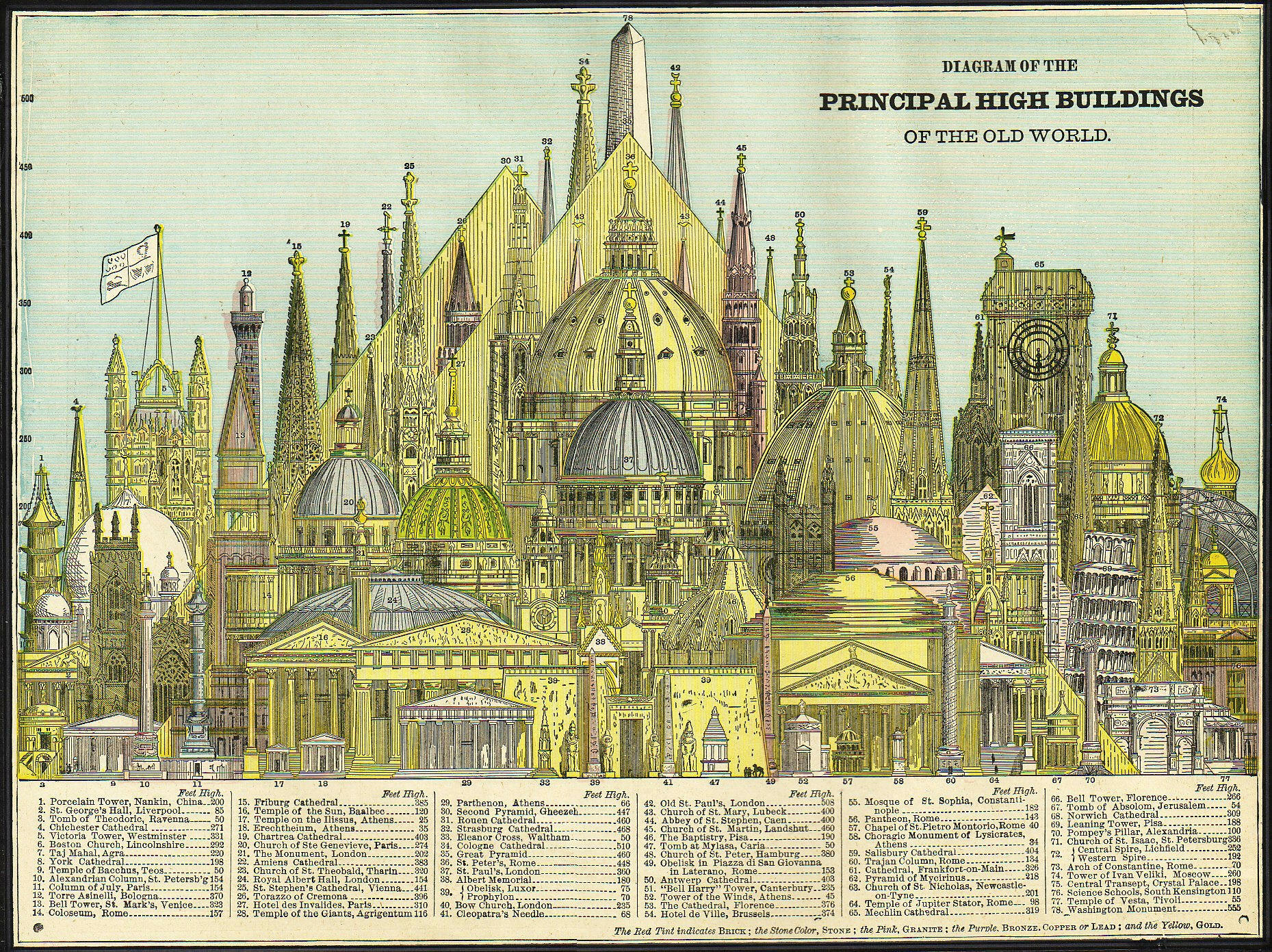
Diagram of the principal high buildings of the Old World, 1884

Notable mentions include the Pharos (lighthouse) of Alexandria, built in the third century BC and estimated between 115–135 m (377–443 ft). It was the world's tallest non-pyramidal structure for many centuries. Another notable mention includes the Jetavanaramaya stupa in Anuradhapura, Sri Lanka, which was built in the third century, and was similarly tall at 122 m (400 ft). These were both the world's tallest or second-tallest non-pyramidal structure for over a thousand years.

The tallest secular building between the collapse of the Pharos and the erection of the Washington Monument may have been the Torre del Mangia in Siena, Italy, which is 102 m (335 ft) tall, and was constructed in the first half of the fourteenth century; and the 97-metre-tall (318 ft) Torre degli Asinelli in Bologna, Italy, built between 1109 and 1119.

== Freestanding towers ==
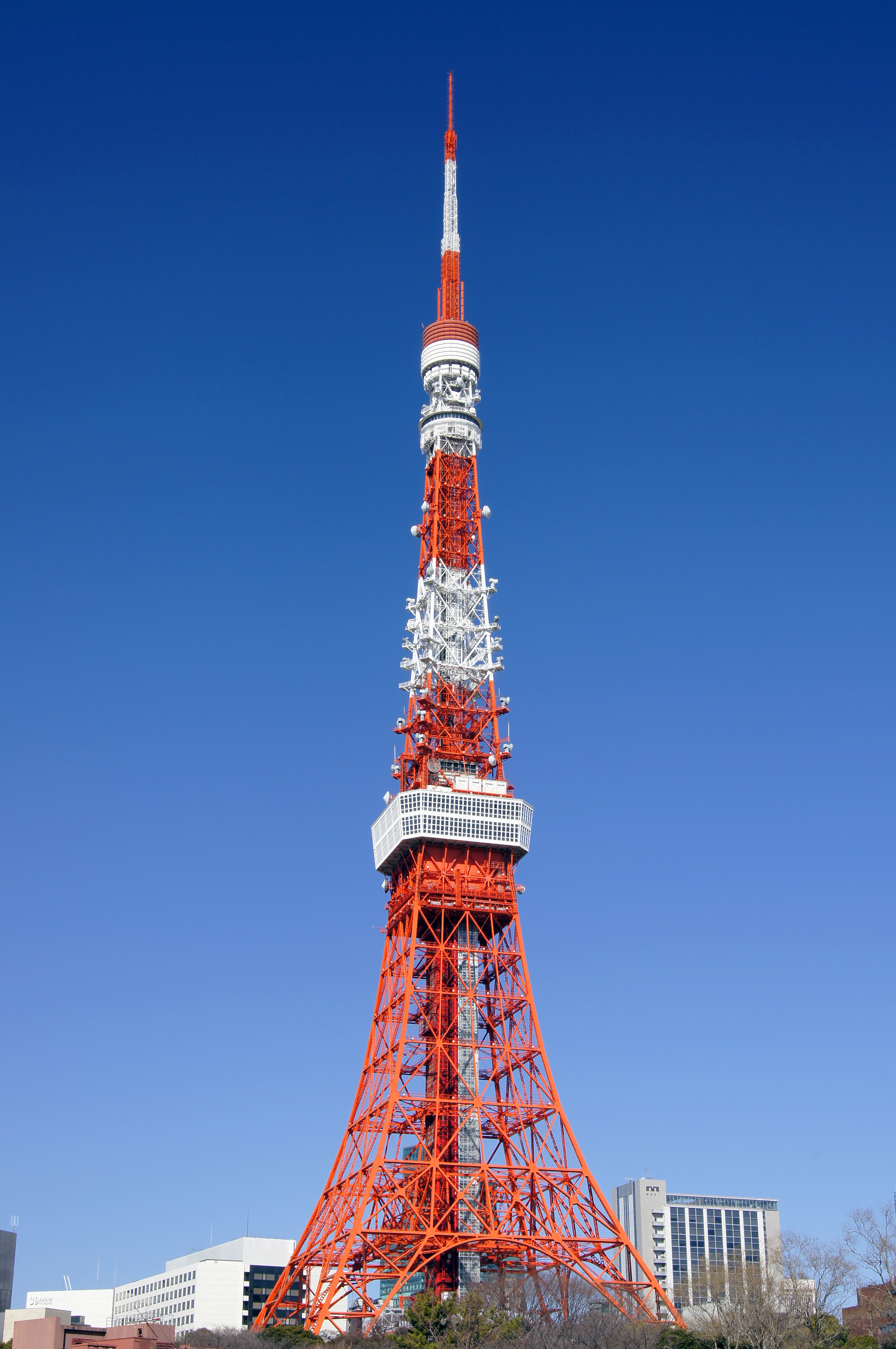
Tokyo Tower held the record of being the tallest tower in the world from 1958 to 1967. In addition, it held the record of being the tallest structure in Japan from 1958 to 2011, when the Tokyo Skytree, as of 2026 the tallest tower (and third tallest structure) in the world, surpassed it.

Towers include observation towers, monuments and other structures not generally considered to be "habitable buildings", they are meant for "regular access by humans, but not for living in or office work", meaning it excludes from this list of continuously habitable buildings and skyscrapers. Radio and TV masts with guy-wires for support are also excluded, since they aren't freestanding.

Bridge towers or pylons, chimneys, transmission towers, and most large statues allow human access for maintenance, but not as part of their normal operation, and are therefore not considered to be towers.

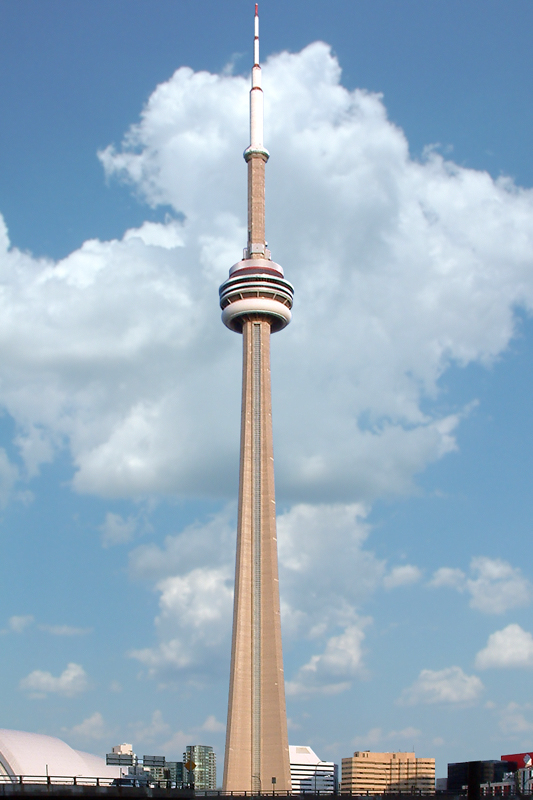
The CN Tower in Toronto was the world's tallest freestanding structure from 1975 to 2007.

The following is a list of structures that have historically held the title as the tallest towers in the world.

Record from	Tower	Location	Pinnacle height
280 BC	Pharos Lighthouse	Alexandria, Egypt	122 m
1180	Malmesbury Abbey Tower	Malmesbury, UK	131.3 m
1221	From 1221–1930 towers held the record for tallest structure overall, as seen in the Overall table above.		
1889	Eiffel Tower	Paris, France	312.3 m
1956	KCTV Broadcast Tower	Kansas City, Missouri, United States	317.6 m
1957	Eiffel Tower (with addition)	Paris, France	320.75 m
1958	Tokyo Tower	Tokyo, Japan	332.6 m
1967	Ostankino Tower	Moscow, Russia	540.1 m
1975	CN Tower	Toronto, Canada	553.33 m
2009	Canton Tower	Guangzhou, China	600 m
2011	Tokyo Skytree	Tokyo, Japan	634 m

== Buildings ==
The Council on Tall Buildings and Urban Habitat, an organization that certifies buildings as the "World's Tallest", recognizes a building only if at least 50% of its height is made up of floor plates containing habitable floor area. Structures that do not meet this criterion, such as the CN Tower, are defined as "towers".

Up until the late 1990s, the definition of "tallest building" was not altogether clear. It was generally understood to be the height of the building to the top of its architectural elements including spires, but not including "temporary" structures (such as antennas or flagpoles), which could be added or changed relatively easily without requiring major changes to the building's design. Varying standards have been used by different organizations, so the accepted height of these structures or buildings depends on which standards are accepted. The Council on Tall Buildings and Urban Habitat has changed its definitions over time. Some of the controversy regarding the definitions and assessment of tall structures and buildings has included the following:

- the definition of a structure, a building and a tower.
- whether a structure, building or tower under construction should be included in any assessment.
- whether a structure, building or tower has to be officially opened before it is assessed.
- whether structures built in and rising above water should have their below-water height included in any assessment.
- whether a structure, building or tower that is guyed is assessed in the same category as self-supporting structures.

Within an accepted definition of a building further controversy has included the following factors:

- whether only habitable height of the building is considered
- whether communication towers with observation galleries should be considered "habitable" in this sense
- whether rooftop antennas, viewing platforms or any other architecture that does not form a habitable floor should be included in the assessment
- whether a floor built at a high level of a telecommunications or viewing tower should change the tower's definition to that of a "building"

One historic case involved the building now famous for the Times Square Ball. Known as One Times Square (at 1475 Broadway in Midtown Manhattan), it was the headquarters for The New York Times, which gave Times Square its name. Completed in 1905, it reached a height of 364 feet (111 meters) to its roof, or 420 feet (130 meters) including its rooftop flagpole, which the Times hoped would give it a record high status but because a flagpole is not an integral architectural part of a building, One Times Square was not generally considered to be taller than the 390-foot-high (120 m) Park Row Building in Lower Manhattan, which was therefore still New York's tallest.

A bigger controversy was the rivalry between two New York City skyscrapers built in the Roaring Twenties—the Chrysler Building and 40 Wall Street. The latter was 927 feet (283 meters) tall, had a shorter pinnacle, and had a much higher top occupied floor (the second category in the 1996 criteria for tallest building). In contrast, the Chrysler Building employed a very long 125-foot (38 m) spire secretly assembled inside the building to claim the title of world's tallest building with a total height of 1,048 feet (319 m), despite having a lower top occupied floor and a shorter height when both buildings' spires are not counted in their heights. Although the architects of record for 40 Wall were H. Craig Severance and Yasuo Matsui, the firm of Shreve & Lamb (who also designed the Empire State Building) served as consulting architects. They wrote a newspaper article claiming that 40 Wall was actually the tallest, since it contained the world's highest usable floor. They pointed out that the observation deck of 40 Wall was nearly 100 feet (30 m) higher than the top floor of the Chrysler, whose surpassing spire was strictly ornamental and essentially inaccessible. Despite the protest, the Chrysler Building was generally accepted as the tallest building in the world for almost a year, until it was surpassed by the Empire State Building's 1,250 feet (380 meters) in 1931.

That was in turn surpassed by the 1,368-foot-high (417 m) Twin Towers of New York's original World Trade Center in 1972, which were in turn surpassed by the Sears Tower in Chicago in 1974. Now called the Willis Tower since 2009, it was 1,451 feet (442 meters) to its flat rooftop, or 1,518 feet (463 meters) including its original antennas. But in 1978 One World Trade Center (commonly known as the North Tower) attained a taller absolute height when it added its 360-foot (110 m) new broadcasting antenna, for a total height of 1,728 feet (526.7 meters). The WTC North Tower maintained this height record (including its antenna) from 1978 until 2000, when the owners of the Willis Tower extended its broadcasting antennae for a total height of 1,729 feet (527.0 meters). Thus the status of the Willis Tower as the "totally" tallest was restored in the face of a new threat looming in the Far East—the "Siamese Twins".

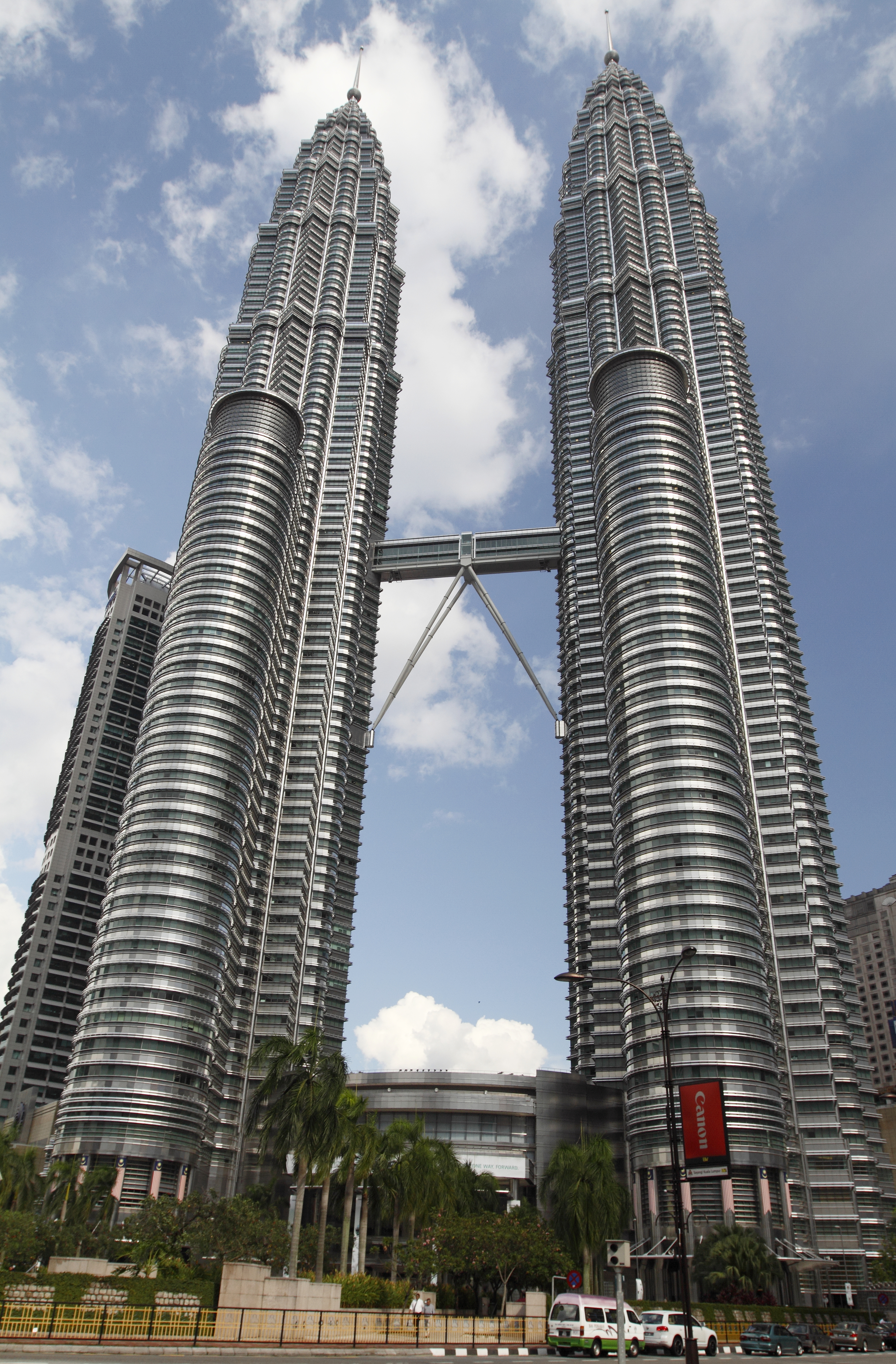
The Petronas Towers remain the tallest twin towers in the world.

A major controversy erupted upon completion of the Petronas Towers in Kuala Lumpur, Malaysia in 1998. These Twin Towers, at 1,483 feet (452 meters), had a higher architectural height (spires, not antennas), but a lower absolute pinnacle height and a lower top occupied floor than the Willis Tower in Chicago. Counting buildings as structures with floors throughout, and with antenna masts excluded, the Willis was still considered the tallest at that time. Excluding their spires, which are 9 meters (30 feet) higher than the flat roof of Willis, the Petronas Towers are not taller than Willis. At their convention in Chicago, the Council on Tall Buildings and Urban Habitat (CTBUH) found the Willis Tower (without its antennas) to be the third-tallest building, and the Petronas Towers (with their spires) to be the world's two tallest buildings.

Responding to the ensuing controversy, the CTBUH then revised their criteria and defined four categories in which the world's tallest building can be measured, retaining the old criterion of height to architectural top, and adding three new categories:

1. Highest occupied floor
2. Height to top of roof (omitted from criteria from November 2009 onwards)
3. Height to architectural top (including spires and pinnacles, but not antennas, masts or flagpoles). This measurement is the most widely used and is used to define the rankings of the 100 Tallest Buildings in the World.
4. Height to tip

The height-to-roof criterion was discontinued because relatively few modern tall buildings possess flat rooftops, making this criterion difficult to determine and measure. The CTBUH has further clarified their definitions of building height, including specific criteria concerning subbasements and ground level entrances (height measured from lowest, significant, open-air, pedestrian entrance rather than from a previously undefined "main entrance"), building completion (must be topped out both structurally and architecturally, fully clad, and able to be occupied), condition of the highest occupied floor (must be continuously used by people living or working and be conditioned, thus including observation decks, but not mechanical floors) and other aspects of tall buildings. The height is measured from the level of the lowest, significant, open-air, pedestrian entrance.

A different superlative for skyscrapers is their number of floors. The original World Trade Center set that record at 110 in the early 1970s, and this was not surpassed until the Burj Khalifa opened in 2010.

Tall freestanding structures such as the CN Tower, the Ostankino Tower and the Oriental Pearl Tower are excluded from these categories because they are not "habitable buildings", which are defined as frame structures made with floors and walls throughout.

Here are the world records by category since the CTBUH defined them in 1996:

World record at the time	Category omitted by CTBUH in 2009

Building	Highest occupied floor	Roof	Architectural top	Tip
1 World Trade Center (with its antenna added in 1979)	386 m (1,268 ft)	417 m (1,368 ft)	417 m (1,368 ft)	526.7 m (1,728 ft)
Willis Tower (with its antennas added in 1982)	413 m (1,354 ft)	442 m (1,450 ft)	442 m (1,451 ft)	520 m (1,707 ft)
Petronas Towers (completed 1998)	375 m (1,230 ft)	405 m (1,329 ft)	452 m (1,483 ft)	452 m (1,483 ft)
Willis Tower (with its antenna extension in 2000)	413 m (1,354 ft)	442 m (1,450 ft)	442 m (1,451 ft)	527.0 m (1,729 ft)
Taipei 101 (completed 2003)	438 m (1,437 ft)	449 m (1,474 ft)	508 m (1,667 ft)	509 m (1,671 ft)
Shanghai World Financial Center (completed 2008)	474 m (1,555 ft)	487 m (1,599 ft)	492 m (1,614 ft)	494 m (1,622 ft)
Burj Khalifa (completed 2010)	585 m (1,921 ft)	739 m (2,426 ft)	828 m (2,717 ft)	830 m (2,722 ft)

== Observation decks ==
Timeline of development of world's highest observation deck since opening of the Washington Monument in 1888.

Record from	Record held (years)	Name and location	Building constructed	Height above ground		Notes
Record from	Record held (years)	Name and location	Building constructed	m	ft	Notes
1888	1	Washington Monument, Washington, D.C., United States	1884	152	500	Was the world's tallest structure when completed.
1889	42	Eiffel Tower, Paris, France	1889	275	902	Two lower observation decks at 57 and 115 m (187 and 377 ft).
1931	42	Empire State Building, New York City, United States	1931	369	1,211	On the 102nd floor – a second observation deck is located on the 86th floor at 320 m (1,050 ft).
1973	1	2 World Trade Center, New York City, United States	1973	399.4	1,310	Measured from sea level, street level was 10 feet above sea level. Indoor observation deck on the 107th floor of South Tower opened on April 4, 1973. Destroyed during the September 11 attacks.
1974	1	Willis Tower, Chicago, United States	1974	412.4	1,353	Measured from the Franklin Street entrance, 103rd floor observation deck opened on June 22, 1974
1975	1	2 World Trade Center, New York City, United States	1973	419.7	1,377	Measured from sea level, street level was 10 feet above sea level. Outdoor observation deck on rooftop of the South Tower opened on December 15, 1975. Destroyed during the September 11 attacks.
1976	32	CN Tower, Toronto, Canada	1976	446.5	1,464.9	Two further observation decks at 342 and 346 m (1,122 and 1,135 ft).
2008	3	Shanghai World Financial Center, Shanghai, China	2008	474	1,555	Two further observation decks at 423 and 439 m (1,388 and 1,440 ft).
2011	3	Canton Tower, Guangzhou, China	2011	488	1,601	The rooftop outdoor observation deck opened in December 2011. There are also several other indoor observation decks in the tower, the highest at 433.2 m (1,421 ft).
2014	2	Burj Khalifa, Dubai, United Arab Emirates	2010	555	1,821	Opened on October 15, 2014, on the 148th floor.
2016	3	Shanghai Tower, Shanghai, China	2015	562	1,841	Opened on July 1, 2016. there are also 2 more observation decks on the 118th and 119th floor, at 546 and 552 meters respectively.
2019	7	Burj Khalifa, Dubai, United Arab Emirates	2010	585	1,919	Opened on February 18, 2019, on the 154th floor. There are other observation decks on floors 153, 152, 148 (listed above), 125, and 124 (at 452.1 m (1,483 ft)).

Higher observation decks have existed on mountain tops or cliffs, rather than on tall structures. The highest is the Tianmen Mountain Glass Skywalk, at 1,430 meters (4,690 feet).

== See also ==
- List of tallest buildings
- List of tallest structures
- History of the world's tallest buildings
- Tallest structures by category
