= KNGF =

Television station in Grand Forks, North Dakota

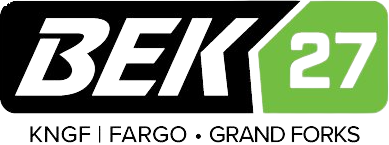
- Grand Forks–Fargo, North Dakota; United States
- City: Grand Forks, North Dakota
- Channels: Digital: 27 (UHF); Virtual: 27
- Branding: BEK TV/BEK 27

Programming
- Affiliations: 27.1: BEK Sports; for others, see § Subchannels

Ownership
- Owner: BEK Communications Cooperative; (BEK Sports Network, Inc.)
- Sister stations: KNDB/KNDM

History
- Founded: July 25, 2022
- First air date: February 9, 2023
- Call sign meaning: North Dakota Grand Forks

Technical information
- Licensing authority: FCC
- Facility ID: 776145
- ERP: 720 kW
- HAAT: 593.9 m (1,948 ft)
- Transmitter coordinates: 47°20′32″N 97°17′21″W

Links
- Public license information: Public file; LMS
- Website: www.bek.tv

KNGF (channel 27) is a sports-formatted independent television station licensed to Grand Forks, North Dakota, United States, serving the Fargo–Grand Forks television market. The station is owned by BEK Sports Network, Inc., a subsidiary of BEK Communications Cooperative. KNGF's transmitter is located on the KVLY-TV mast near Blanchard, North Dakota.

== History ==
Channel 27 in Grand Forks was formerly occupied by KCPM, whose license was canceled on March 9, 2020, for failure to transmit from authorized facilities for the past 12 months. The frequency was put up for auction on June 7, 2022, along with 26 other full-power TV licenses. BEK Sports Network, Inc. was awarded channel 27 with a $6,411,000 winning bid.

BEK was formally granted a construction permit for the new station on July 25, 2022. KNGF filed for a license to cover on February 9, 2023, which usually indicates that a station has signed on the air.

Prior to KNGF's launch, BEK programming was seen on KRDK-TV (channel 4) during the afternoon and evening hours.

== Subchannels ==
The station's signal is multiplexed:

Subchannels of KNGF
Channel	Res.	Short name	Programming
27.1	720p	BEK TV	BEK Sports
27.2	720p	BEKSP2	BEK Sports Plus East
27.3	720p	BEKSP3	BEK Sports Plus West
27.4	720p	BEKNews	BEK News
27.5	720p	NewsMX2	Newsmax2
27.6	480i	BEK-WX	Weather
