= KFVS TV Mast =

Television tower in Missouri, U.S.

KFVS TV Mast (also Raycom America Tower Cape Girardeau) is a guyed mast that is 1677 feet (511.1 m) tall, used for transmitting television signals. It was built during 1960 and is located in Cape Girardeau County, Missouri, USA at 37°25′46″N, 89°30′14″W. At the time of its construction it was the world's tallest structure, being exceeded during 1962 by another transmission tower. Broadcasting from the antenna atop the tower, KFVS-TV's signal reaches customers in portions of Missouri, Illinois, Kentucky, Tennessee, and Arkansas.

== See also ==
- List of masts

Records
Preceded by WGME TV Tower	World's tallest structure 1677 ft (511.1 m); 1960–1962	Succeeded by WTVM/WRBL-TV & WVRK-FM Tower
