= KRDK-TV mast =

Television-transmitting mast near Galesburg, North Dakota

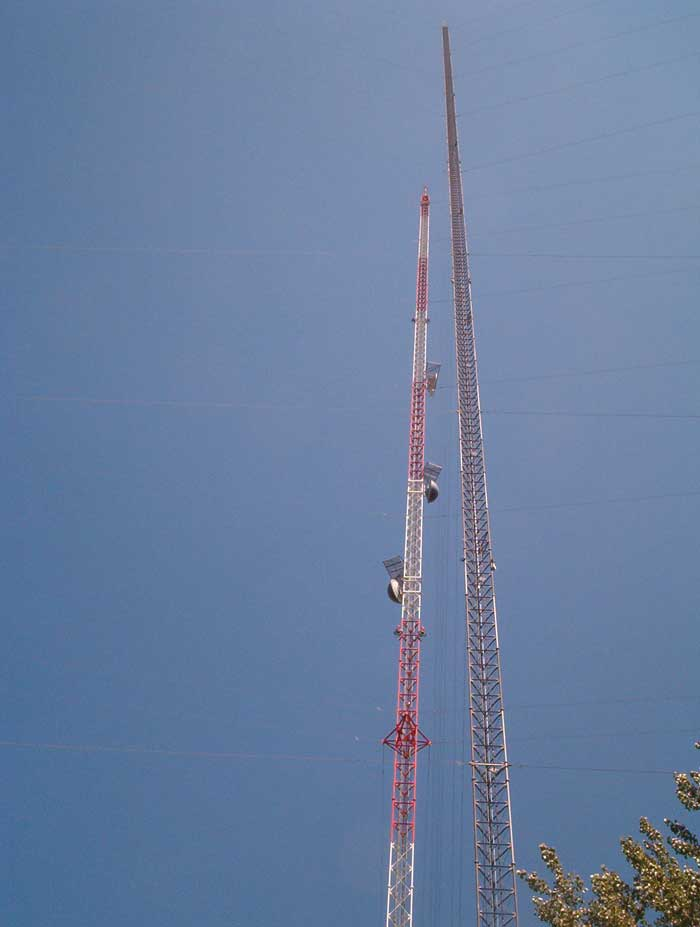
- Interactive map of the KRDK-TV mast area

General information
- Type: TV transmission tower (effective radiated power = 285 kW)
- Location: Galesburg, Traill County, North Dakota, U.S.
- Coordinates: 47°16′45″N 97°20′26″W
- Owner: Parker Broadcasting of Dakota, LLC

Height
- Height: 627.8 metres (2,060 ft)

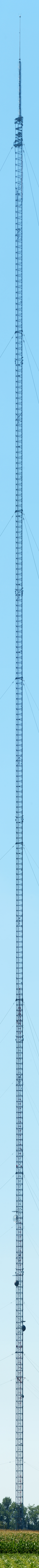

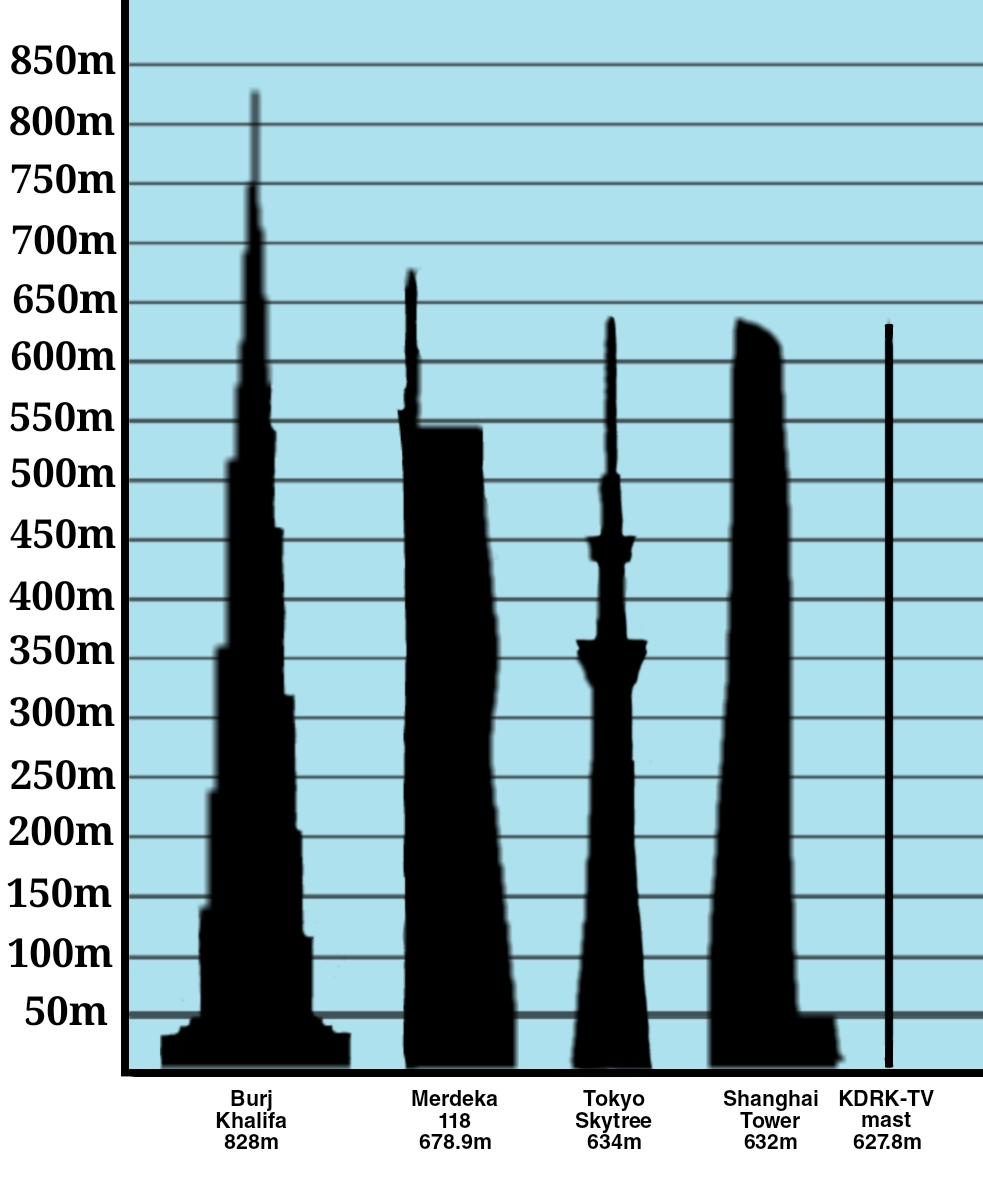
Tallest structures in the world.

The KRDK-TV mast is a television transmitting tower 3.5 miles (5.6 km) northeast of Galesburg in Traill County, North Dakota, United States. It was completed in 1966 and is used by KRDK-TV (formerly KXJB-TV), which is licensed to Valley City, serving the Fargo and Grand Forks TV markets.

At 627.8 metres (2,060 ft), it is currently the tallest structure in the Western Hemisphere and the sixth-tallest structure in the world. It stands 72.8 ft (22.2 m) taller than the nearby KVLY-TV mast in Blanchard, North Dakota, which was previously 1 metre (3.3 ft) taller until the removal of a VHF antenna reduced its height in 2019.

The KRDK-TV antenna has an effective radiated power (ERP) of 285 kW. The station and tower are owned by Major Market Broadcasting. It replaced the station's previous mast, a 1,085-foot (331 m) tower 15 miles (24 km) northeast of Valley City, North Dakota (or southwest of Pillsbury) which was sold to KOVC, an AM radio station.

== Collapses ==
The mast has fallen and been rebuilt twice. The first collapse occurred at 9:08 a.m. on February 14, 1968, when the rotor of a Marine helicopter severed multiple guy-wires; all four passengers aboard the helicopter were killed in the accident. The television station was off the air for eight days, finally resuming broadcasts from their previous (KOVC) tower. A replacement mast of the same height as the one destroyed was completed in four and a half months.

The second mast fell during an ice storm which hit the area on April 6, 1997, subjecting it to wind gusts of 70 mph and causing at least four inches (100 mm) of ice to accumulate on the structure, resulting in the structure's failure at 6:09 p.m. Cable programming was resumed by 8:34 and broadcasts by 3 p.m. the following afternoon through coordination with other affiliates; a 735-foot (224 m) temporary tower was completed and resumed broadcasts by July 10. This tower, known as KXJB-TV Mast 2, still stands next to the full-height mast.

Work began on the replacement of the full-height mast with a more durably-built structure on April 1, 1998, and had reached the tower's previous height by July 30. That day members of the construction crew affixed a four-foot (1.2 m) flagpole to the top of the tower, making the structure's height effectively 2,064 ft (629 m), or one foot higher than the KVLY mast (the flagpole was later removed). Broadcasting for Channel 4 was switched to the new mast on August 15.

== Gallery ==
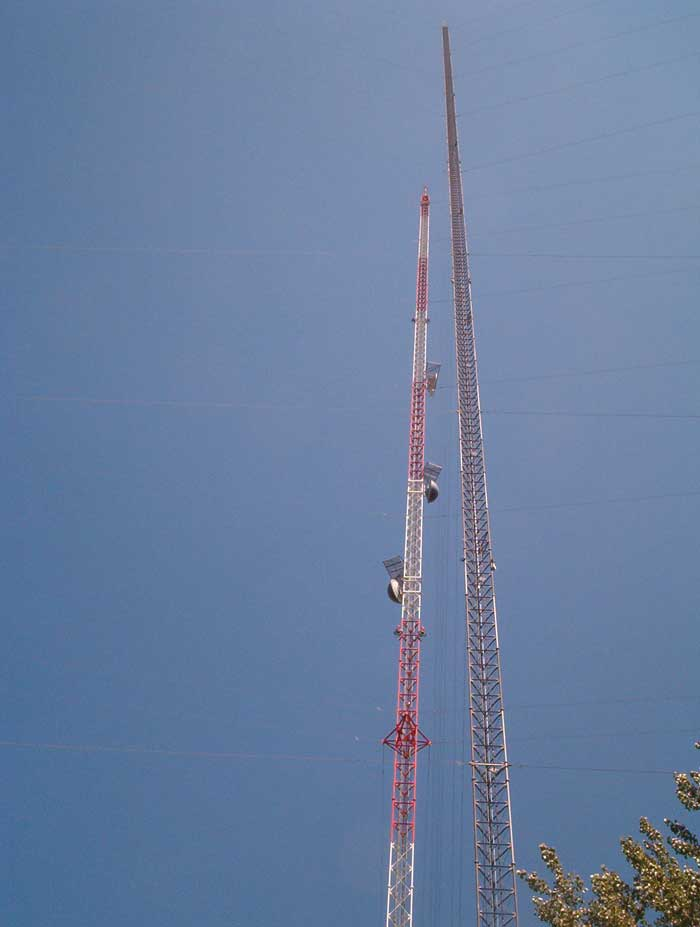
224 meters tall KXJB-TV mast 2 in foreground and KXJB-TV mast in background

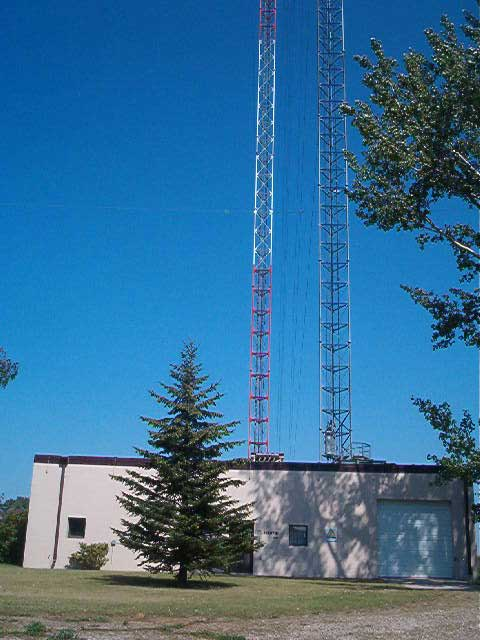
Base of the towers, the large KXJB-TV mast is in the background

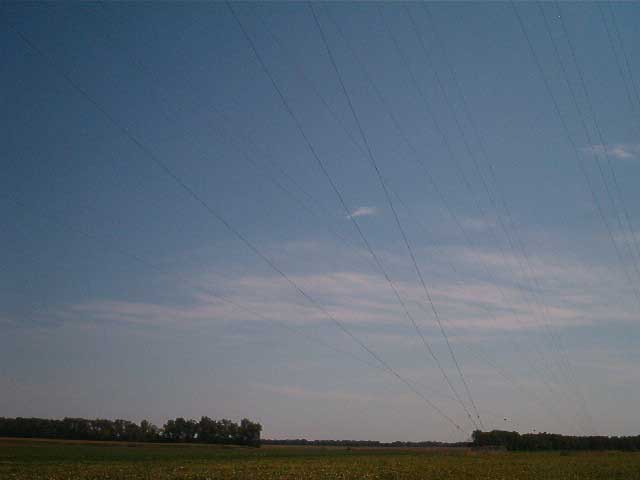
A section of the network of supporting guy wires

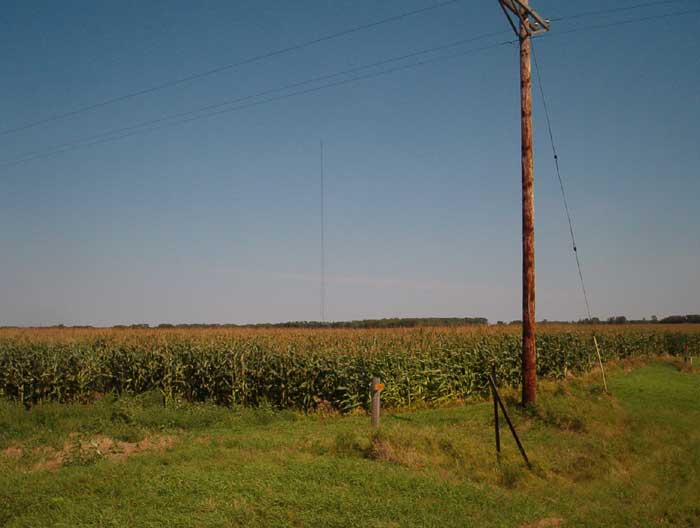
View from about one mile

== See also ==
- List of tallest structures in the world
- KRDK-TV

Records
Preceded by KVLY-TV mast	World's tallest structure 2,064 ft (629 m) with flagpole 1998	Succeeded by KVLY-TV mast
