= Traill County, North Dakota =

County in North Dakota, United States

- County
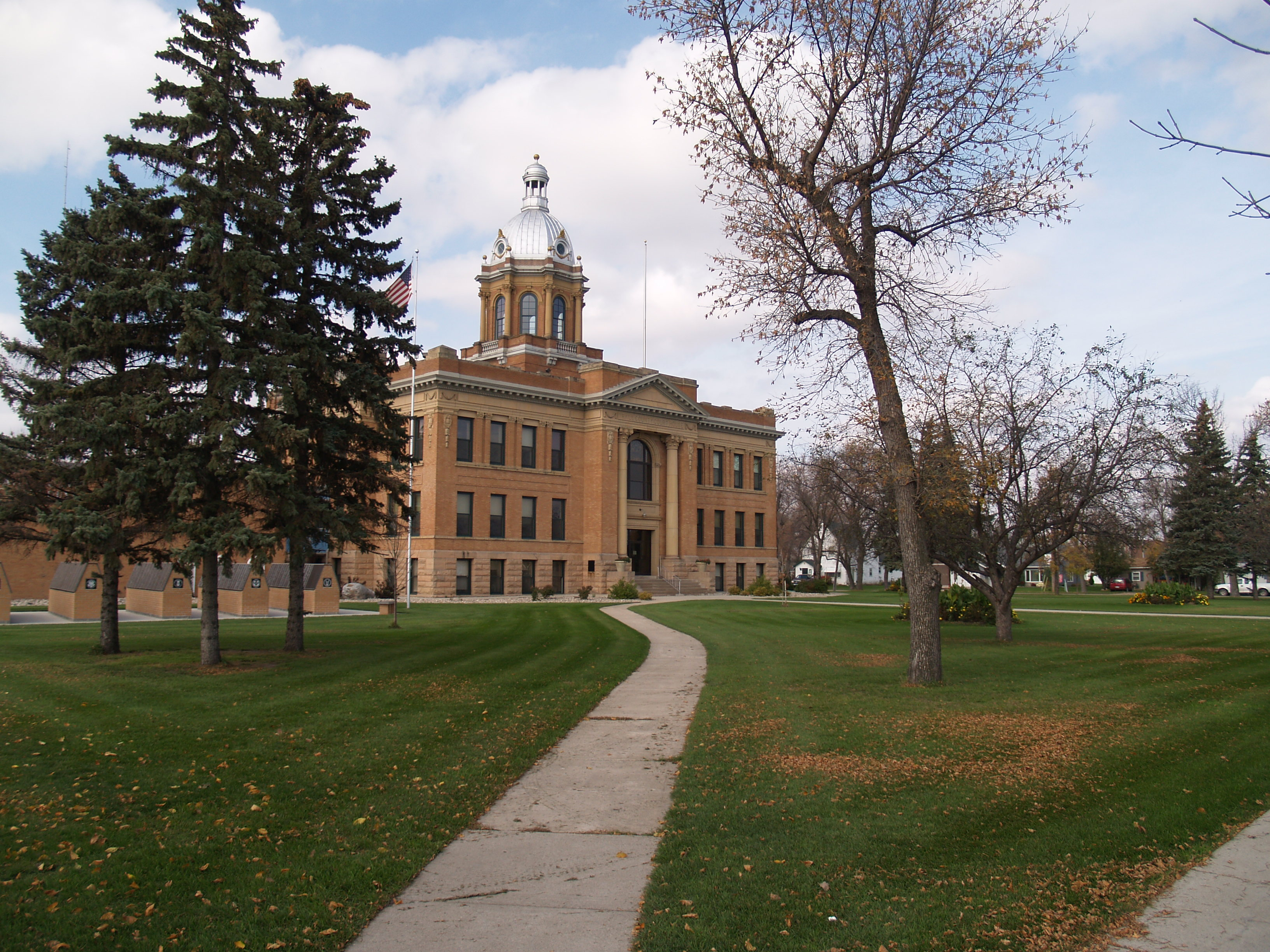
- The Traill County Courthouse in Hillsboro

- Location within the U.S. state of North Dakota
- Coordinates: 47.446271°N 97.164636°W
- Country: United States
- State: North Dakota
- Founded: January 12, 1875 (created); February 23, 1875 (organized)
- Named for: Walter John Strickland Traill
- Seat: Hillsboro
- Largest city: Mayville

Area
  - Total: 862.436 sq mi (2,233.70 km^{2})
  - Land: 861.871 sq mi (2,232.24 km^{2})
  - Water: 0.565 sq mi (1.46 km^{2}) 0.07%

Population (2020)
  - Total: 7,997
  - Estimate (2025): 7,920 ▼
  - Density: 9.269/sq mi (3.579/km^{2})
- Time zone: UTC−6 (Central)
  - Summer (DST): UTC−5 (CDT)
- Area code: 701
- Congressional district: At-large
- Website: co.traill.nd.us

Traill County is a county in the U.S. state of North Dakota. As of the 2020 census, the population at 7,997, and was estimated to be 7,920 in 2025. The county seat is Hillsboro and the largest city is Mayville.

== History ==
The Dakota Territory legislature created the county on January 12, 1875, with areas partitioned from Burbank (now Barnes), Cass, and Grand Forks Counties. It was named for Walter John Strickland Traill, an employee of the Hudson's Bay Company and son of Canadian pioneer Catharine Parr Traill. The first county building was a small single-story building in Caledonia. Several replacement courthouses were built during the late 19th century and several votes to move the county seat to Mayville narrowly failed. Efforts to move the county seat to Hillsboro were more successful, and all county records were moved there in 1890. Construction of the current county building began in 1905; it is now listed on the National Register of Historic Places.

The county boundaries were altered in 1881 and in 1883. It has maintained its current configuration since 1883.

== Geography ==
Traill County lies on the east side of North Dakota. Its east boundary line abuts the west boundary line of the state of Minnesota (across the Red River). The Goose River flows eastward through the center of the county to discharge into the Red. The northward-flowing Red River forms the eastern boundary line of the county on its way to the Hudson Bay, and the Elk River flows south-southeastward through the southwestern part of the county. The county terrain consists of rolling hills, devoted to agriculture. The terrain slopes to the east and north, with its highest point on the lower western boundary line, at 1,201 ft (366 m) ASL.

According to the United States Census Bureau, the county has a total area of 862.436 square miles (2,233.70 km^{2}), of which 861.871 square miles (2,232.24 km^{2}) is land and 0.565 square miles (1.46 km^{2}) (0.07%) is water. It is the 47th largest county in North Dakota by total area.

=== Major highways ===
- Interstate 29
- US 81
- North Dakota Highway 18
- North Dakota Highway 200
- North Dakota Highway 200A

=== Airports ===
- Hillsboro Municipal Airport (3H4)
- Mayville Municipal Airport (D56)

=== Adjacent counties ===
- Grand Forks County - north
- Polk County, Minnesota - northeast
- Norman County, Minnesota - east
- Cass County - south
- Steele County - west

== Demographics ==
Historical population
| Census | Pop. | Note | %± |
|---|---|---|---|
| 1880 | 4,123 | | — |
| 1890 | 10,217 | | 147.8% |
| 1900 | 13,107 | | 28.3% |
| 1910 | 12,545 | | −4.3% |
| 1920 | 12,210 | | −2.7% |
| 1930 | 12,600 | | 3.2% |
| 1940 | 12,300 | | −2.4% |
| 1950 | 11,359 | | −7.7% |
| 1960 | 10,583 | | −6.8% |
| 1970 | 9,571 | | −9.6% |
| 1980 | 9,624 | | 0.6% |
| 1990 | 8,752 | | −9.1% |
| 2000 | 8,477 | | −3.1% |
| 2010 | 8,121 | | −4.2% |
| 2020 | 7,997 | | −1.5% |
| 2025 (est.) | 7,920 | ▼ | −1.0% |
U.S. Decennial Census; 1790–1960 1900–1990; 1990–2000 2010–2020

As of the fourth quarter of 2024, the median home value in Traill County was $204,706.

As of the 2023 American Community Survey, there are 3,316 estimated households in Traill County with an average of 2.27 persons per household. The county has a median household income of $88,289. Approximately 8.4% of the county's population lives at or below the poverty line. Traill County has an estimated 65.9% employment rate, with 31.2% of the population holding a bachelor's degree or higher and 93.7% holding a high school diploma.

The top five reported ancestries (people were allowed to report up to two ancestries, thus the figures will generally add to more than 100%) were English (96.5%), Spanish (2.0%), Indo-European (1.0%), Asian and Pacific Islander (0.4%), and Other (0.1%).

The median age in the county was 40.7 years.

Traill County, North Dakota – racial and ethnic composition
Note: the US Census treats Hispanic/Latino as an ethnic category. This table excludes Latinos from the racial categories and assigns them to a separate category. Hispanics/Latinos may be of any race.

| Race / ethnicity (NH = non-Hispanic) | Pop. 1980 | Pop. 1990 | Pop. 2000 | Pop. 2010 | Pop. 2020 |
|---|---|---|---|---|---|
| White alone (NH) | 9,487 (98.58%) | 8,568 (97.90%) | 8,170 (96.38%) | 7,693 (94.73%) | 7,311 (91.42%) |
| Black or African American alone (NH) | 6 (0.06%) | 12 (0.14%) | 9 (0.11%) | 39 (0.48%) | 48 (0.60%) |
| Native American or Alaska Native alone (NH) | 24 (0.25%) | 43 (0.49%) | 72 (0.85%) | 63 (0.78%) | 60 (0.75%) |
| Asian alone (NH) | 9 (0.09%) | 22 (0.25%) | 13 (0.15%) | 21 (0.26%) | 18 (0.23%) |
| Pacific Islander alone (NH) | — | — | 1 (0.01%) | 1 (0.01%) | 4 (0.05%) |
| Other race alone (NH) | 10 (0.10%) | 6 (0.07%) | 0 (0.00%) | 1 (0.01%) | 10 (0.13%) |
| Mixed race or multiracial (NH) | — | — | 27 (0.32%) | 89 (1.10%) | 249 (3.11%) |
| Hispanic or Latino (any race) | 88 (0.91%) | 101 (1.15%) | 185 (2.18%) | 214 (2.64%) | 297 (3.71%) |
| Total | 9,624 (100.00%) | 8,752 (100.00%) | 8,477 (100.00%) | 8,121 (100.00%) | 7,997 (100.00%) |

=== 2024 estimate ===
As of the 2024 estimate, there were 7,989 people and 3,316 households residing in the county. There were 3,659 housing units at an average density of 4.25 per square mile (1.6/km^{2}). The racial makeup of the county was 94.0% White (90.4% NH White), 1.3% African American, 1.8% Native American, 0.7% Asian, 0.0% Pacific Islander, _% from some other races and 2.2% from two or more races. Hispanic or Latino people of any race were 4.1% of the population.

=== 2020 census ===
As of the 2020 census, there were 7,997 people, 3,230 households, and 2,031 families residing in the county. The population density was 9.28 inhabitants per square mile (3.6/km^{2}). There were 3,649 housing units at an average density of 4.23 per square mile (1.6/km^{2}).

Of the residents, 23.3% were under the age of 18 and 20.2% were 65 years of age or older; the median age was 40.6 years. For every 100 females there were 103.8 males, and for every 100 females age 18 and over there were 102.3 males.

The racial makeup of the county was 92.7% White, 0.6% Black or African American, 0.9% American Indian and Alaska Native, 0.2% Asian, 1.0% from some other race, and 4.5% from two or more races. Hispanic or Latino residents of any race comprised 3.7% of the population.

There were 3,230 households in the county, of which 27.2% had children under the age of 18 living with them and 20.7% had a female householder with no spouse or partner present. About 31.1% of all households were made up of individuals and 14.0% had someone living alone who was 65 years of age or older.

There were 3,649 housing units, of which 11.5% were vacant. Among occupied housing units, 74.0% were owner-occupied and 26.0% were renter-occupied. The homeowner vacancy rate was 1.8% and the rental vacancy rate was 17.9%.

=== 2010 census ===
As of the 2010 census, there were 8,121 people, 3,394 households, and 2,150 families residing in the county. The population density was 9.42 inhabitants per square mile (3.6/km^{2}). There were 3,780 housing units at an average density of 4.39 per square mile (1.7/km^{2}). The racial makeup of the county was 96.16% White, 0.52% African American, 0.79% Native American, 0.26% Asian, 0.01% Pacific Islander, 1.10% from some other races and 1.17% from two or more races. Hispanic or Latino people of any race were 2.64% of the population.

In terms of ancestry, 53.2% were Norwegian, 38.1% were German, 5.9% were Irish, and 2.6% were American.

There were 3,394 households, 27.6% had children under the age of 18 living with them, 54.2% were married couples living together, 6.2% had a female householder with no husband present, 36.7% were non-families, and 31.3% of all households were made up of individuals. The average household size was 2.29 and the average family size was 2.88. The median age was 42.6 years.

The median income for a household in the county was $44,290 and the median income for a family was $60,054. Males had a median income of $39,846 versus $28,378 for females. The per capita income for the county was $23,340. About 4.6% of families and 9.2% of the population were below the poverty line, including 10.9% of those under age 18 and 11.1% of those age 65 or over.

== Communities ==
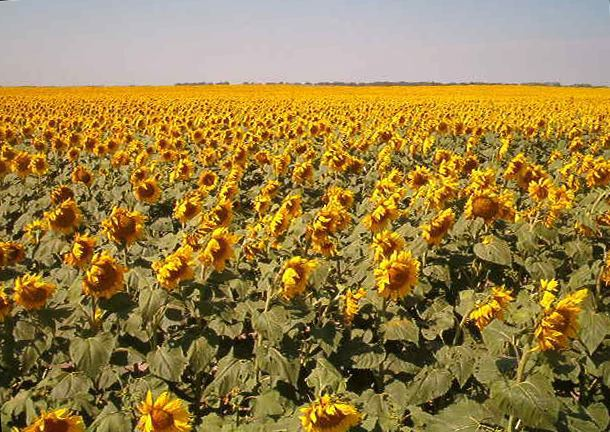
Sunflower field in Traill County

=== Cities ===
- Buxton
- Clifford
- Galesburg
- Grandin (part)
- Hatton
- Hillsboro (county seat)
- Mayville
- Portland
- Reynolds (part)

=== Census-designated places ===
- Blanchard
- Caledonia

=== Unincorporated communities ===
- Cummings

=== Townships ===
- Belmont
- Bingham
- Blanchard
- Bloomfield
- Bohnsack
- Buxton
- Caledonia
- Eldorado
- Elm River
- Ervin
- Galesburg
- Garfield
- Greenfield
- Herberg
- Hillsboro
- Kelso
- Lindaas
- Mayville
- Morgan
- Norman
- Norway
- Roseville
- Stavanger
- Viking
- Wold

== Politics ==
Traill County voters lean Republican. In only two national elections since 1964 has the county selected the Democratic Party candidate. In the first of these (1996), in which heavy third-party performance was involved, Democrat Bill Clinton carried the county by a margin of two votes.

United States presidential election results for Traill County, North Dakota
| Year | Republican | | Democratic | | Third party(ies) | |
| Year | No. | % | No. | % | No. | % |
|---|---|---|---|---|---|---|
| 1900 | 1,537 | 76.13% | 409 | 20.26% | 73 | 3.62% |
| 1904 | 1,566 | 82.99% | 176 | 9.33% | 145 | 7.68% |
| 1908 | 1,207 | 66.03% | 490 | 26.81% | 131 | 7.17% |
| 1912 | 365 | 21.05% | 507 | 29.24% | 862 | 49.71% |
| 1916 | 1,423 | 64.62% | 664 | 30.15% | 115 | 5.22% |
| 1920 | 3,666 | 86.00% | 523 | 12.27% | 74 | 1.74% |
| 1924 | 2,596 | 56.64% | 234 | 5.11% | 1,753 | 38.25% |
| 1928 | 3,638 | 71.36% | 1,447 | 28.38% | 13 | 0.26% |
| 1932 | 1,893 | 37.31% | 3,112 | 61.33% | 69 | 1.36% |
| 1936 | 1,807 | 34.29% | 2,780 | 52.76% | 682 | 12.94% |
| 1940 | 2,882 | 53.47% | 2,476 | 45.94% | 32 | 0.59% |
| 1944 | 2,370 | 48.68% | 2,479 | 50.91% | 20 | 0.41% |
| 1948 | 2,328 | 52.00% | 1,874 | 41.86% | 275 | 6.14% |
| 1952 | 3,884 | 72.05% | 1,484 | 27.53% | 23 | 0.43% |
| 1956 | 3,090 | 61.04% | 1,969 | 38.90% | 3 | 0.06% |
| 1960 | 3,218 | 60.68% | 2,084 | 39.30% | 1 | 0.02% |
| 1964 | 2,312 | 46.91% | 2,614 | 53.03% | 3 | 0.06% |
| 1968 | 2,692 | 57.55% | 1,740 | 37.20% | 246 | 5.26% |
| 1972 | 3,118 | 61.40% | 1,892 | 37.26% | 68 | 1.34% |
| 1976 | 2,800 | 53.32% | 2,352 | 44.79% | 99 | 1.89% |
| 1980 | 3,092 | 60.91% | 1,428 | 28.13% | 556 | 10.95% |
| 1984 | 3,037 | 64.70% | 1,580 | 33.66% | 77 | 1.64% |
| 1988 | 2,562 | 56.20% | 1,940 | 42.55% | 57 | 1.25% |
| 1992 | 2,019 | 44.34% | 1,638 | 35.98% | 896 | 19.68% |
| 1996 | 1,820 | 45.03% | 1,822 | 45.08% | 400 | 9.90% |
| 2000 | 2,392 | 58.17% | 1,512 | 36.77% | 208 | 5.06% |
| 2004 | 2,543 | 59.86% | 1,651 | 38.87% | 54 | 1.27% |
| 2008 | 1,845 | 45.66% | 2,136 | 52.86% | 60 | 1.48% |
| 2012 | 1,996 | 50.91% | 1,811 | 46.19% | 114 | 2.91% |
| 2016 | 2,265 | 57.59% | 1,241 | 31.55% | 427 | 10.86% |
| 2020 | 2,522 | 60.98% | 1,493 | 36.10% | 121 | 2.93% |
| 2024 | 2,650 | 64.40% | 1,359 | 33.03% | 106 | 2.58% |

County Commissioners
| Position | Name | District | Next Election |
|---|---|---|---|
| Commissioner | Thomas Eblen | District 1 | 2026 |
| Commissioner | Kurt Elliott | District 2 | 2028 |
| Commissioner | Kendall Nesvig | District 3 | 2026 |
| Commissioner and Chairman | Larry Young | District 4 | 2028 |
| Commissioner and Vice Chairman | Les Amb | District 5 | 2026 |

State Legislature (2025-2026)
| Position | Name | Affiliation | District |
|---|---|---|---|
| Senate | Randy Lemm | Republican | District 20 |
| House of Representatives | Dave Rustebakke | Republican | District 20 |
| House of Representatives | Mike Beltz | Republican | District 20 |

U.S Congress (2025-2027)
| Position | Name | Affiliation | District |
|---|---|---|---|
| House of Representatives | Julie Fedorchak | Republican | At-Large |
| Senate | John Hoeven | Republican | N/A |
| Senate | Kevin Cramer | Republican | N/A |

== See also ==
- KVLY-TV mast
- KRDK-TV mast
- National Register of Historic Places listings in Traill County, North Dakota
