= KVLY-TV mast =

Television-transmitting mast in Blanchard, North Dakota

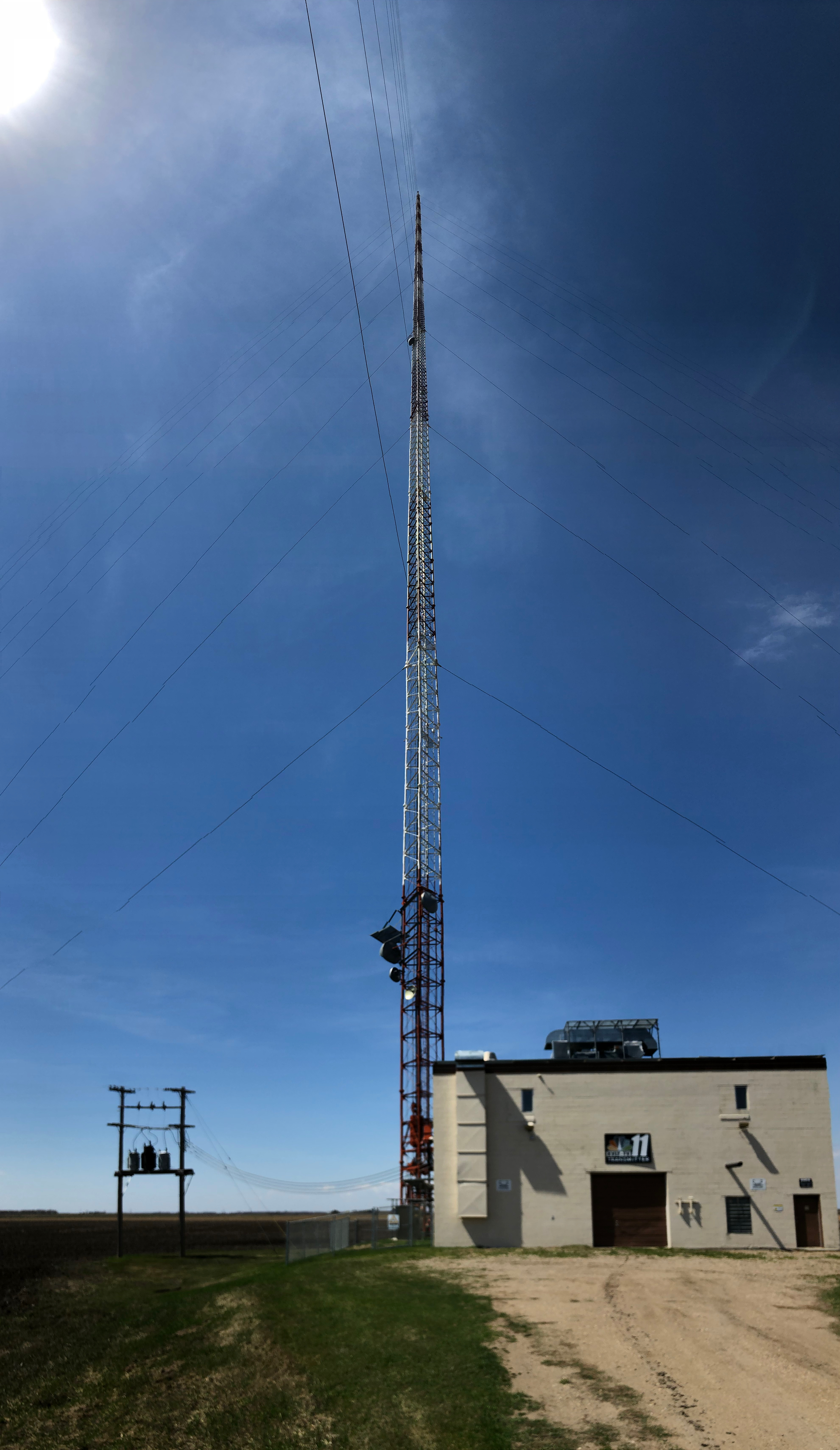
- KVLY-TV mast in 2018

- Location within North Dakota Location within the United States

General information
- Type: TV transmission tower (effective radiated power = 316 kW)
- Location: Blanchard, Traill County, North Dakota, U.S.
- Coordinates: 47°20′32″N 97°17′21″W
- Completed: 13 August 1963
- Owner: Gray Media

Height
- Height: 605.6 metres (1,987 ft)

Design and construction
- Architect: Hamilton Directors
- Main contractor: Kline Iron and Steel

The KVLY-TV mast (formerly the KTHI-TV mast) is a television-transmitting mast in Blanchard, North Dakota. It is used by Fargo station KVLY-TV (channel 11) and KXJB-LD's Argusville/Valley City/Mayville translator K28MA-D (channel 28), along with KNGF (channel 27). Completed in 1963, it was once the tallest structure in the world, and stood at 628.8 metres (2,063 ft) until 2019, when the top mount VHF antenna was removed for the FCC spectrum repack, dropping the height to 605.6 metres (1,987 ft).

In 1974, the KVLY-TV mast was succeeded by the Warsaw radio mast as the world's tallest structure. The Warsaw mast collapsed in 1991, again making the KVLY-TV mast the tallest structure in the world until the Burj Khalifa surpassed it in 2008. The KVLY-TV mast remained the tallest structure in the Western Hemisphere and the tallest broadcasting mast in the world until the removal of its antenna in 2019.

== Location ==
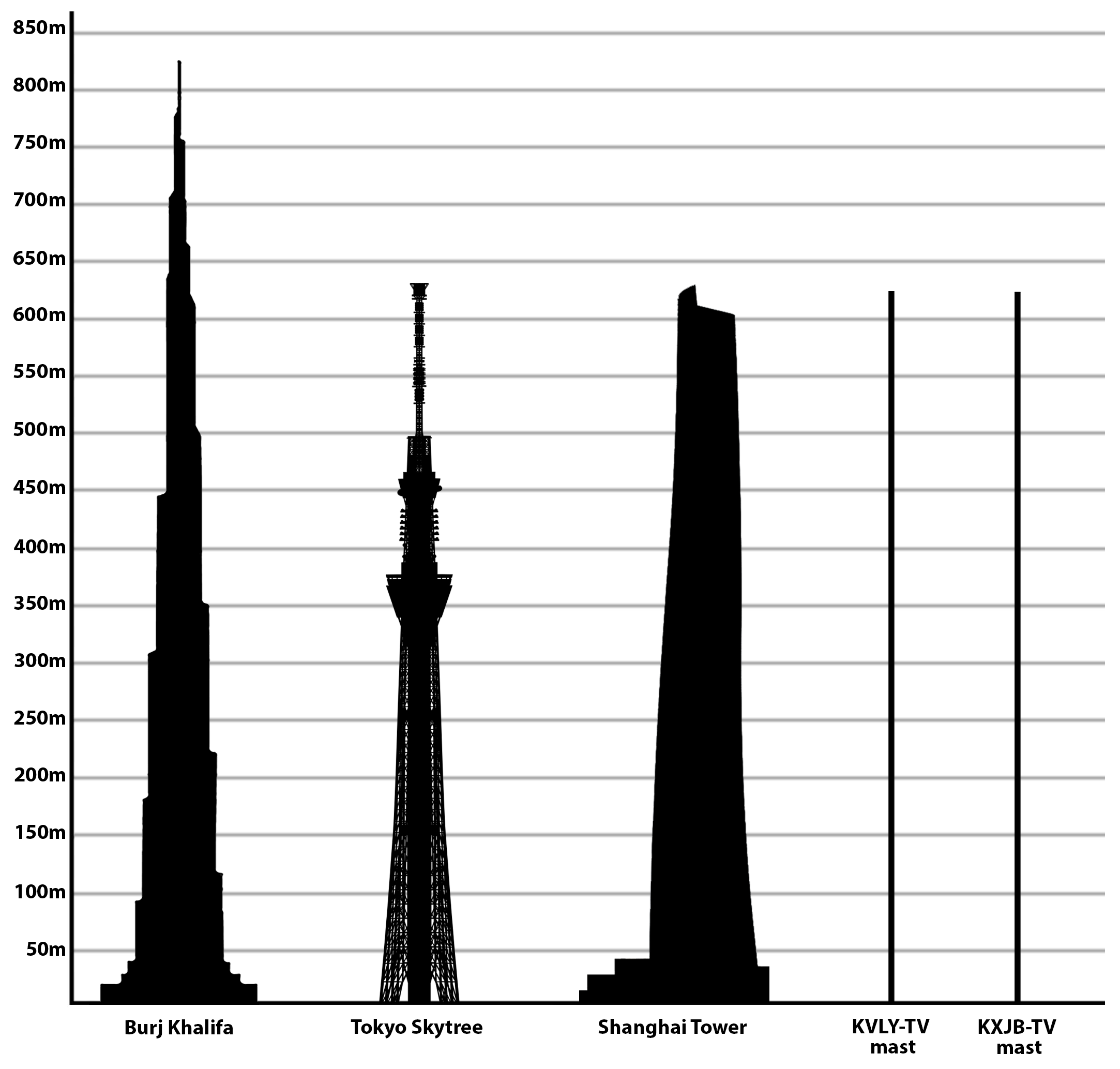
KVLY-TV mast compared to the tallest buildings in the world. KXJB-TV has since been renamed KRDK-TV.

The mast is located 3 miles (4.8 km) west of Blanchard, North Dakota, halfway between Fargo and Grand Forks. It became the tallest artificial structure, and the first man-made structure to exceed 2,000 feet (610 m) in height, upon the completion of its construction on August 13, 1963.

== Construction ==
The tower was built by Hamilton Erection Company of York, South Carolina, and Kline Iron and Steel, and required thirty days to complete, at a cost of approximately $500,000 (roughly $5.26 million today). Construction was completed August 13, 1963.

== Owners ==
Owned by Gray Media of Atlanta, Georgia, the tower broadcasts at 350 kW on channel 36 for television station KVLY-TV (channel 11 PSIP, an NBC/CBS affiliate) which is based in Fargo, North Dakota. The tower provides a broadcast area of roughly 9,700 square miles (25,000 km^{2}), which is a radius of about 55.0 miles (88.5 km). CBS/CW+ affiliate KXJB-LD's translator K28MA-D also broadcasts on this tower at 15 kW on UHF channel 28 (also its virtual channel).

When the mast was built, the call letters of the television station for which it was built were changed to KTHI for "Tower High". The top is reachable by a two-person service elevator (built by Park Manufacturing of Charlotte, North Carolina) or ladder.

== Specifications ==
The tower consists of two parts: a lattice tower of 1,950 feet (590 m); topped by the transmitting antenna array of 53 feet (16 m). The total height of both is 1,987 feet (606 m). The antenna weighs 9,000 pounds (4.1 t), the lattice tower weighs 855,500 pounds (388.0 t), giving a total weight of 864,500 pounds (392.1 t). It takes up 160 acres (65 ha) of land with its guy anchors. Its height above mean sea level is 2,962 feet (903 m).

== Federal rule change ==
Some time after its completion, the Federal Communications Commission (FCC) and Federal Aviation Administration (FAA) imposed a policy that states, "Although there is no absolute height limit for antenna towers, both agencies have established a rebuttable presumption against structures over 2,000 feet above ground level." The FCC and FAA may approve a taller structure in "exceptional cases."

== Gallery ==
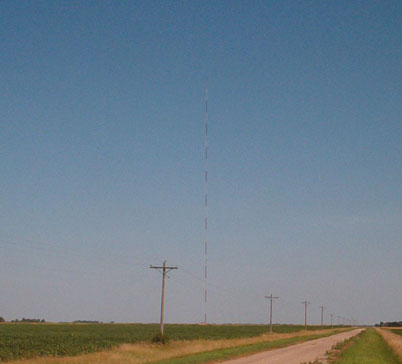
KVLY tower from a distance of about one mile (1.6 km)

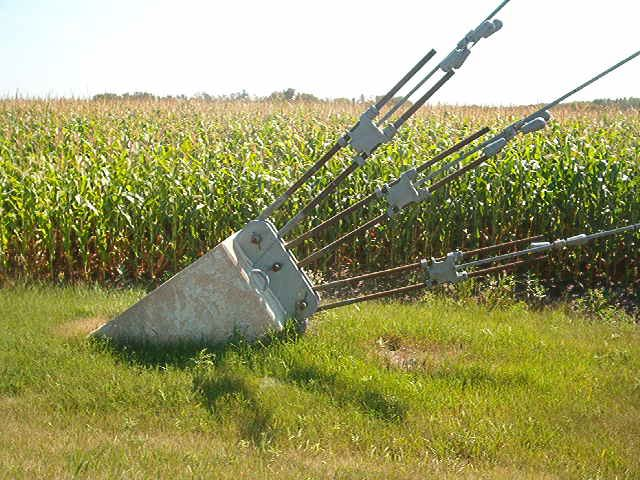
A guy-wire anchor

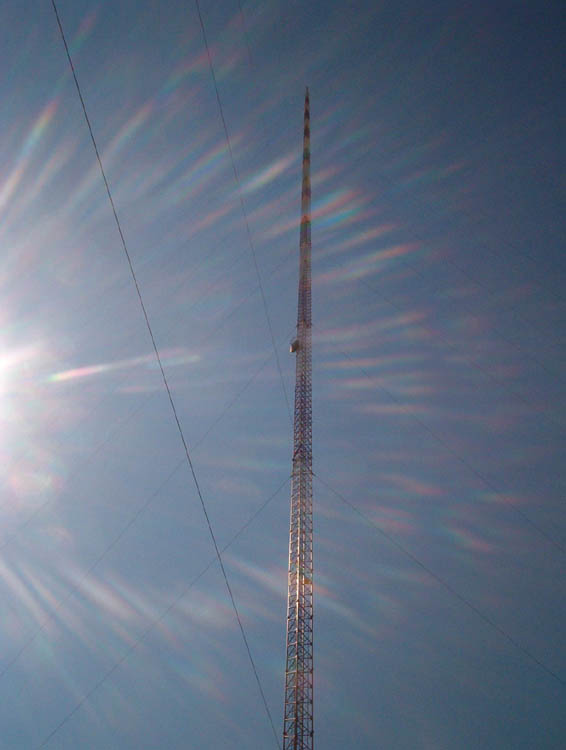
Detail of the tower, showing its network of guy-wires

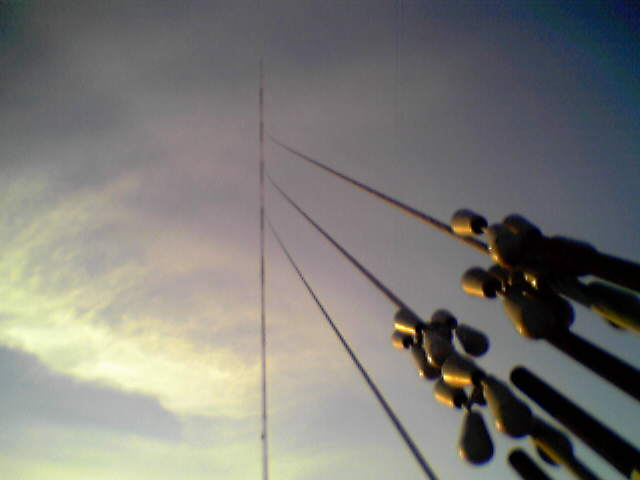
Some of the guy-wires that support the tower (with Stockbridge dampers)

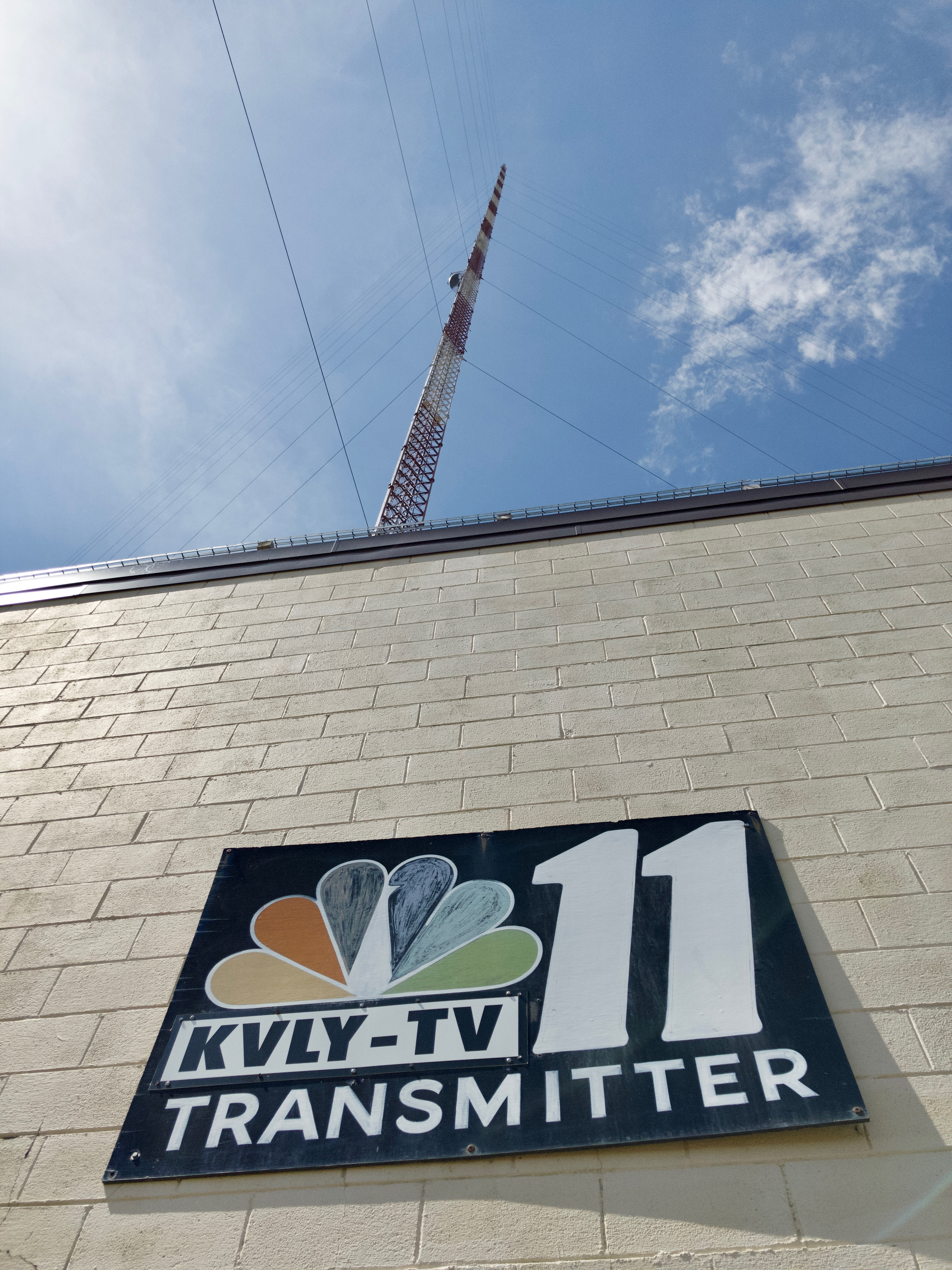
Looking up at the KVLY-TV mast from its base

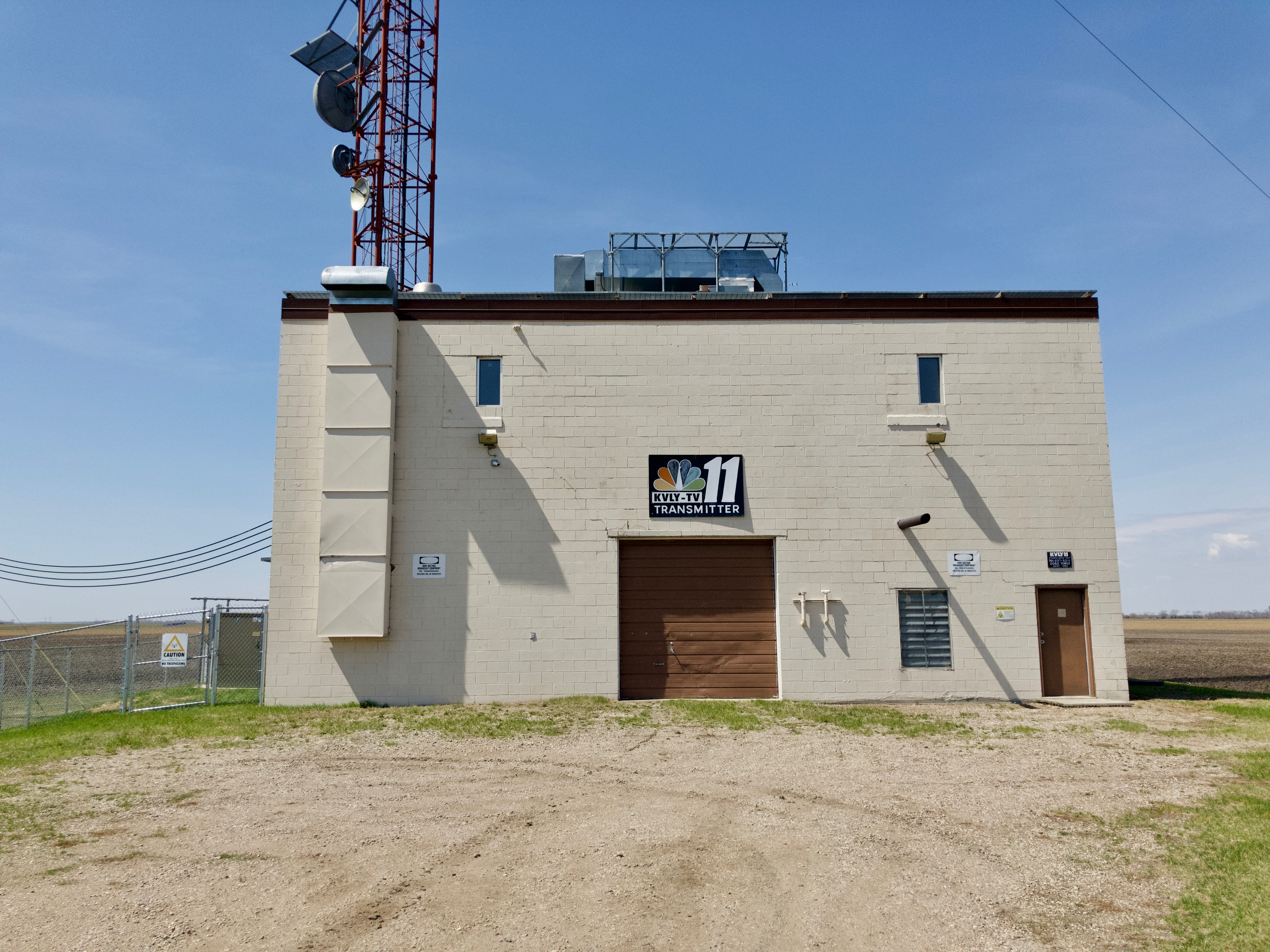
Building at the base of the KVLY-TV tower

== Structures of similar height ==
- KRDK-TV mast (2,060 feet (628 m))
- KXTV/KOVR tower (2,049 feet (625 m))

== See also ==
- List of tallest structures in the world
- List of tallest structures in the United States

Records
Preceded by WIMZ-FM-Tower	World's tallest structure ever built 1963–1974; 2,063 ft (628.8 m)	Succeeded by Warsaw radio mast
Preceded by Warsaw radio mast	World's tallest existing structure 1991–1998	Succeeded by KRDK-TV mast
Preceded by KRDK-TV mast	World's tallest existing structure 1998–2008	Succeeded by Burj Khalifa
Preceded by KRDK-TV mast	World's tallest existing tower 1998–2011	Succeeded by Tokyo Skytree
Preceded by KRDK-TV mast	World's tallest existing guyed structure 1998–2018	Succeeded by KRDK-TV mast
