= WTVM/WRBL/WVRK Tower =

Architectural structure

WTVM/WRBL/WVRK Tower, also known as the WTVM TV Mast, is a 533-meter guyed mast used for television broadcasting by WTVM, WRBL and FM radio broadcasting by WVRK-FM. It is located near Cusseta, Georgia in the United States at 32°19′16.4″N 84°47′28.2″W.

At the time of its completion during 1962, the WTVM/WRBL/WVRK tower was the tallest structure in the world. However, during 1963, the WIMZ-FM tower in Knoxville, Tennessee exceeded it.

Presently, despite being comparable in height to the Willis Tower in Chicago, the WTVM/WRBL/WVRK tower is not even the tallest structure in Cusseta, Georgia. During 2005, the Cusseta Richland Towers Tower, a 538.2 meter guyed mast situated at 32°19′16.4″N, 84°47′28.2″W, surpassed it in height.

== See also ==
- WTVM
- WRBL
- WVRK-FM
- List of masts
- List of tallest structures in the world

Records
Preceded by KFVS TV Mast	World's tallest structure 1,749 ft (533 m); 1962–1963	Succeeded by WIMZ-FM-Tower
