= Kline Iron and Steel =

American tower constructor

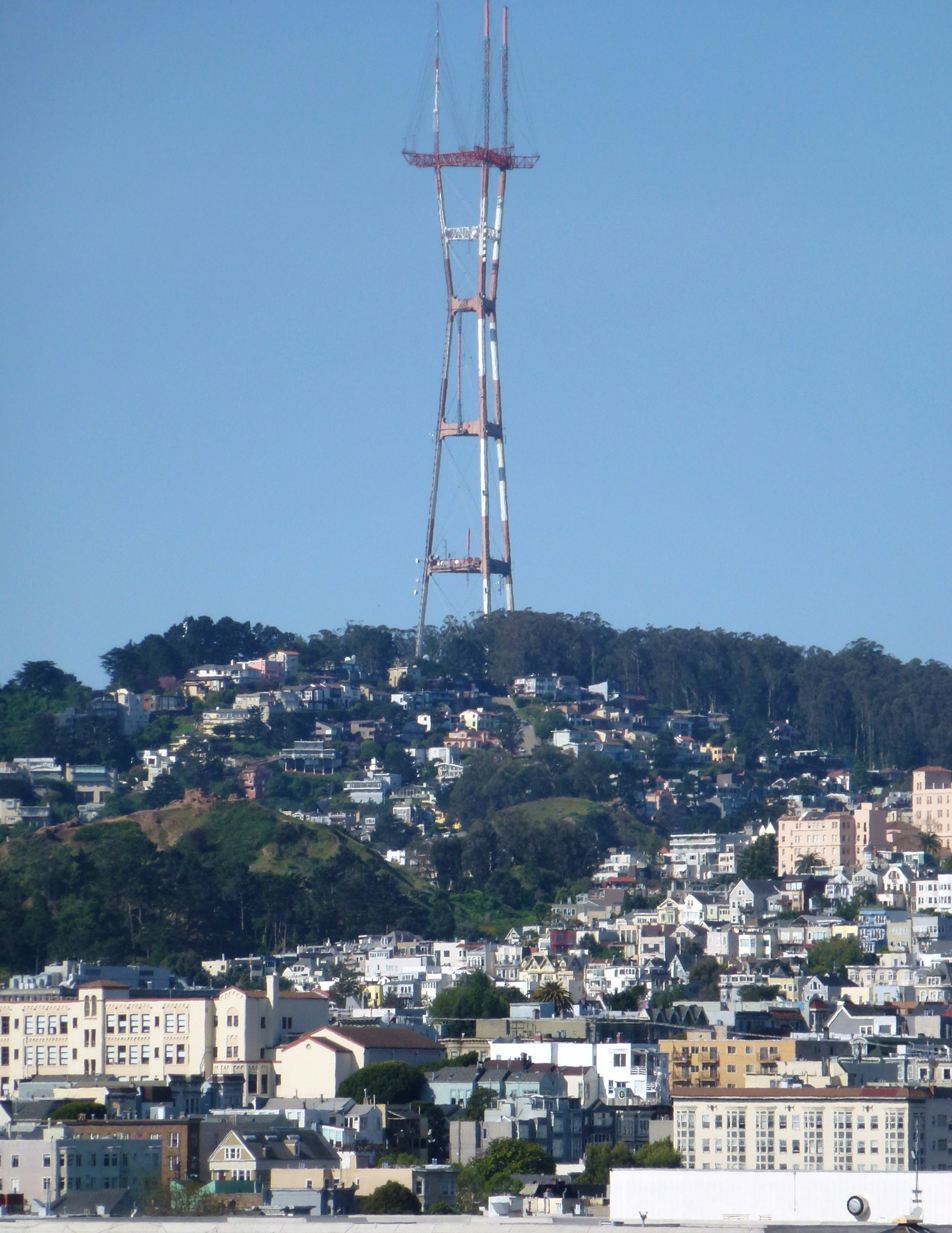
The Sutro Tower in San Francisco, California.

Kline Iron and Steel was a company based in Columbia, South Carolina, United States. Established on February 23, 1923, as Kline Iron and Metal Co., since 1953 was primarily known for the construction of broadcast towers. This includes the former world's tallest man-made structure, the KVLY-TV mast, surpassed by the Burj Khalifa in 2010.

History Timeline:

- 1923- Kline Iron and Metal, Co. founded.
- 1984- Central Tower founded.
- 2000- Merger with American Tower Corporation.
- 2001- Central Tower is acquired by Dielectric Communications.
- 2004- Dielectric Communications acquires Kline Iron and Metal Co.
- 2005- Central Tower and Kline Tower merge to form Dielectric Tower Operations.
- 2006- Dielectric Tower Operations sold to Liberty Industries to form Tower Innovations.
