= Blanchard, North Dakota =

- Census-designated place
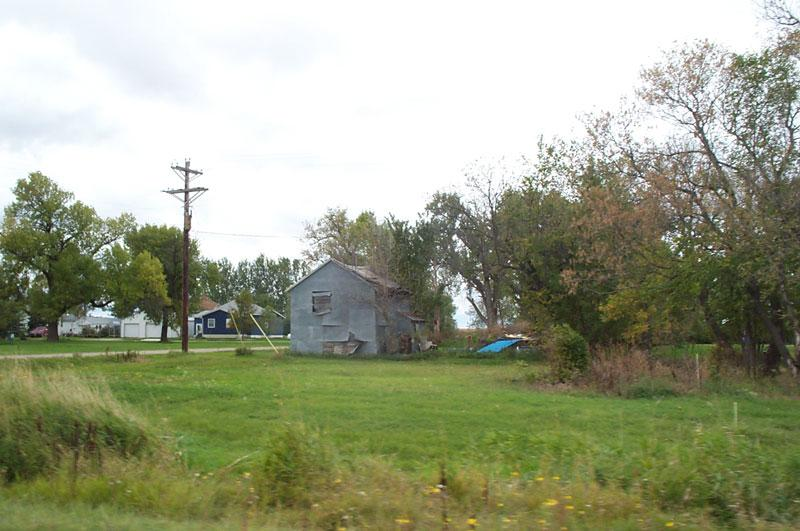
- Blanchard residential street

- Location within the state of North Dakota
- Coordinates: 47°20′35″N 097°13′23″W
- Country: United States
- State: North Dakota
- County: Traill

Area
  - Total: 0.25 sq mi (0.66 km^{2})
  - Land: 0.25 sq mi (0.66 km^{2})
  - Water: 0 sq mi (0.00 km^{2})
- Elevation: 945 ft (288 m)

Population (2020)
  - Total: 16
  - Density: 62.8/sq mi (24.25/km^{2})
- Time zone: UTC-6 (Central (CST))
  - Summer (DST): UTC-5 (CDT)
- ZIP code: 58009
- Area code: 701
- FIPS code: 38-07620
- GNIS feature ID: 2584337

Blanchard is a census-designated place in Blanchard Township, Traill County, North Dakota, United States. The population was 16 at the 2020 census.

Blanchard is near the North Dakota-Minnesota border, near the junction of state highways 18 and 200.

The KVLY-TV mast was the tallest man-made structure in the Western Hemisphere until 2019. It stands near Blanchard. The mast is used to transmit television broadcasts from the Fargo station KVLY-TV and was the tallest man-made structure in the world from 1963 to 1974 and again from 1991 to 2008. Similarly, the KRDK-TV mast, the tallest man-made structure in the United States, stands 6 miles (9.7 km) from Blanchard, near Galesburg.

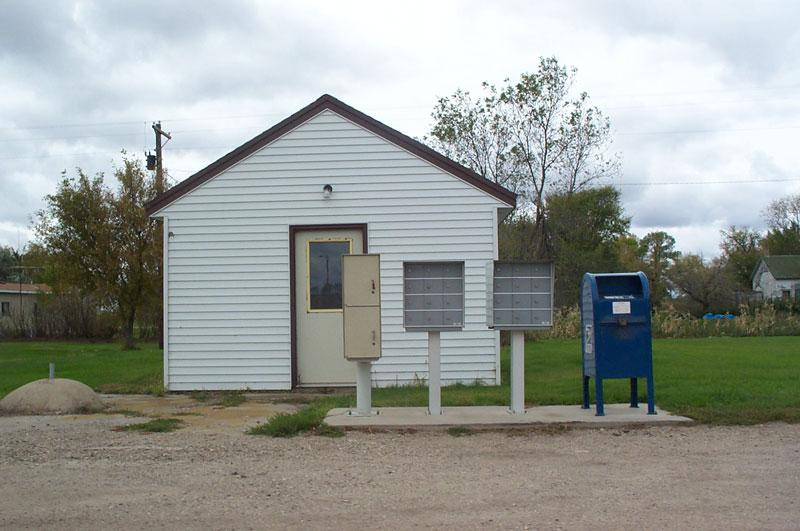
Blanchard post office

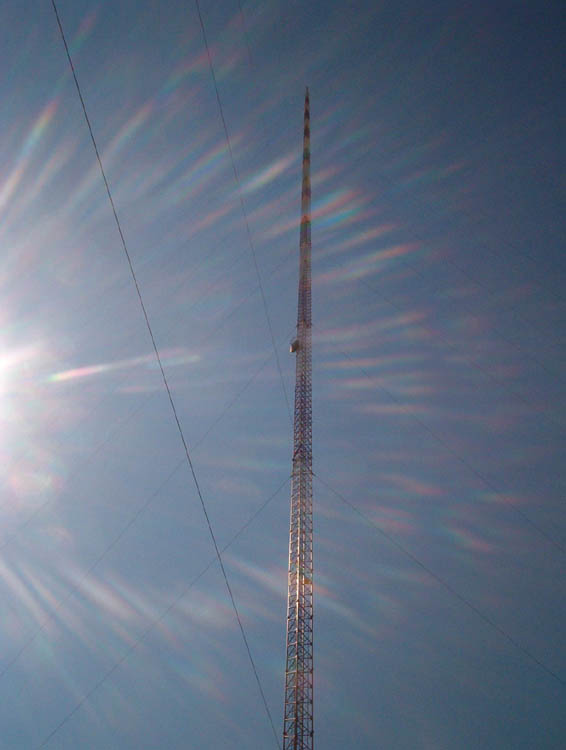
KVLY-TV mast seen close-up

== Demographics ==
Historical population
Census	Pop.	Note	%±
2010	26		—
2020	16		−38.5%
U.S. Decennial Census

== Education ==
It is within the Hillsboro Public School District 9.
