= Galesburg, North Dakota =

Galesburg
- City
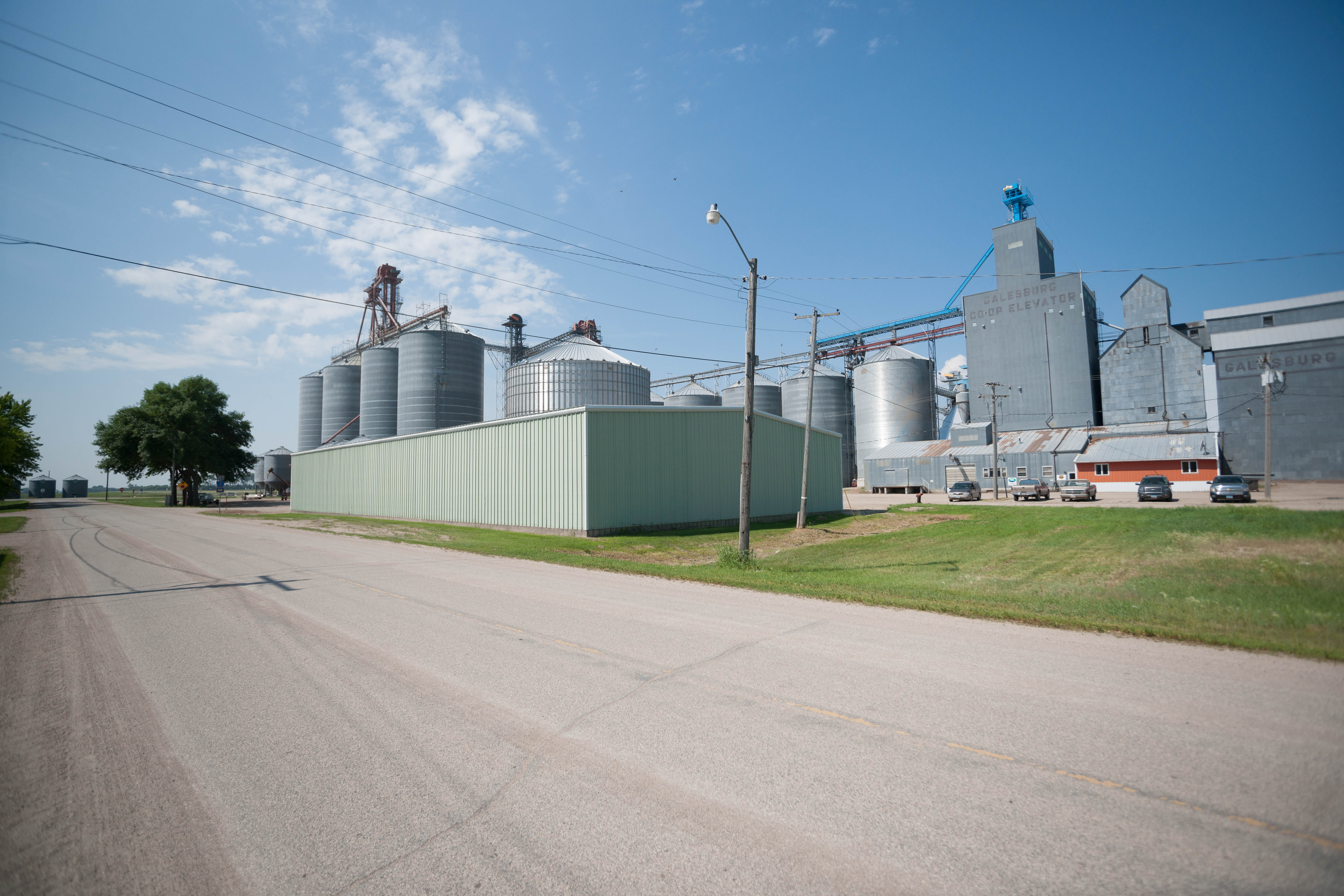
- Grain Elevator in Galesburg

- Logo

- Location of Galesburg, North Dakota
- Coordinates: 47°16′12″N 97°24′32″W
- Country: United States
- State: North Dakota
- County: Traill
- Founded: 1882

Area
  - Total: 0.17 sq mi (0.43 km^{2})
  - Land: 0.17 sq mi (0.43 km^{2})
  - Water: 0 sq mi (0.00 km^{2})
- Elevation: 1,079 ft (329 m)

Population (2020)
  - Total: 118
  - Estimate (2022): 115
  - Density: 714.4/sq mi (275.84/km^{2})
- Time zone: UTC-6 (Central (CST))
  - Summer (DST): UTC-5 (CDT)
- ZIP code: 58035
- Area code: 701
- FIPS code: 38-28980
- GNIS feature ID: 1036049
- Website: www.cityofgalesburgnd.org

Galesburg is a city in Traill County, North Dakota, United States. The population was 118 at the 2020 census. Galesburg was founded in 1882.

Galesburg is the home to the world's fifth tallest currently standing structure, the KRDK-TV mast, which stands at 2,060 ft (630 m) tall.

== Geography ==
According to the United States Census Bureau, the city has a total area of 0.17 square miles (0.44 km^{2}), all land.

== Demographics ==
Historical population
Census	Pop.	Note	%±
1950	169		—
1960	166		−1.8%
1970	134		−19.3%
1980	165		23.1%
1990	161		−2.4%
2000	157		−2.5%
2010	108		−31.2%
2020	118		9.3%
2022 (est.)	115		−2.5%
U.S. Decennial Census; 2020 Census

=== 2010 census ===
As of the census of 2010, there were 108 people, 56 households, and 29 families residing in the city. The population density was 635.3 inhabitants per square mile (245.3/km^{2}). There were 64 housing units at an average density of 376.5 per square mile (145.4/km^{2}). The racial makeup of the city was 98.1% White and 1.9% Native American.

There were 56 households, of which 10.7% had children under the age of 18 living with them, 44.6% were married couples living together, 3.6% had a female householder with no husband present, 3.6% had a male householder with no wife present, and 48.2% were non-families. 42.9% of all households were made up of individuals, and 10.7% had someone living alone who was 65 years of age or older. The average household size was 1.93 and the average family size was 2.62.

The median age in the city was 49.3 years. 13% of residents were under the age of 18; 7.3% were between the ages of 18 and 24; 16.6% were from 25 to 44; 37.1% were from 45 to 64; and 25.9% were 65 years of age or older. The gender makeup of the city was 59.3% male and 40.7% female.

=== 2000 census ===
As of the census of 2000, there were 157 people, 66 households, and 44 families residing in the city. The population density was 937.8 inhabitants per square mile (362.1/km^{2}). There were 76 housing units at an average density of 454.0 per square mile (175.3/km^{2}). The racial makeup of the city was 97.45% White and 2.55% Native American.

There were 66 households, out of which 31.8% had children under the age of 18 living with them, 56.1% were married couples living together, 6.1% had a female householder with no husband present, and 33.3% were non-families. 33.3% of all households were made up of individuals, and 16.7% had someone living alone who was 65 years of age or older. The average household size was 2.38 and the average family size was 3.02.

In the city, the population was spread out, with 26.1% under the age of 18, 4.5% from 18 to 24, 33.8% from 25 to 44, 14.6% from 45 to 64, and 21.0% who were 65 years of age or older. The median age was 37 years. For every 100 females, there were 137.9 males. For every 100 females age 18 and over, there were 127.5 males.

The median income for a household in the city was $35,000, and the median income for a family was $43,750. Males had a median income of $27,679 versus $20,500 for females. The per capita income for the city was $15,507. About 14.6% of families and 18.5% of the population were below the poverty line, including 32.1% of those under the age of eighteen and 8.1% of those 65 or over.

== Education ==
It is in the May-Port CG Public School District 14.
