= List of television stations in Mississippi =

This is a list of broadcast television stations that are licensed in the U.S. state of Mississippi.

== Full-power ==
- Stations are arranged by media market served and channel position.

Full-power television stations in Mississippi
Media market	Station	Channel	Primary affiliation(s)	Notes	Refs
Biloxi	WLOX	13	ABC, CBS on 13.2		
Biloxi	WMAH-TV	19	PBS	(Note: Satellite of WMPN-TV.)	
Biloxi	WXXV-TV	25	Fox, NBC on 25.2, The CW on 25.3	(Note: Licensed to Gulfport, Mississippi.)	
Greenwood	WABG-TV	6	ABC, Fox on 6.2		
Greenwood	WFXW	15	TCT	(Note: Licensed to Greenville, Mississippi.)	
Greenwood	WMAO-TV	23	PBS		
Hattiesburg–Laurel	WDAM-TV	7	NBC, ABC on 7.2	(Note: Licensed to Laurel, Mississippi.)	
Hattiesburg–Laurel	WHLT	22	CBS, The CW on 22.2	(Note: Semi-satellite of WJTV.)	
Jackson	WLBT	3	NBC		
Jackson	WJTV	12	The CW, Independent on 12.2		
Jackson	WAPT	16	ABC, CBS on 16.4		
Jackson	WMAU-TV	17	PBS	(Note: Licensed to Bude, Mississippi.)	
Jackson	WWJX	23	TCT		
Jackson	WMPN-TV	29	PBS		
Jackson	WRBJ-TV	34	TBN	(Note: Licensed to Magee, Mississippi.)	
Jackson	WLOO	35	MyNetworkTV	(Note: Licensed to Vicksburg, Mississippi.)	
Jackson	WDBD	40	Fox		
Meridian	WTOK-TV	11	ABC, MyNetworkTV on 11.2, The CW on 11.3		
Meridian	WMAW-TV	14	PBS		
Meridian	WMDN	24	CBS		
Meridian	WGBC	30	Fox, NBC on 30.2		
Tupelo–Starkville–Columbus	WMAB-TV	2	PBS	(Note: Licensed to Mississippi State, Mississippi.)	
Tupelo–Starkville–Columbus	WCBI-TV	4	CBS, Fox on 4.2, MyNetworkTV on 4.3	(Note: Licensed to Columbus, Mississippi.)	
Tupelo–Starkville–Columbus	WTVA	9	NBC, ABC on 9.2		
Tupelo–Starkville–Columbus	WMAE-TV	12	PBS	(Note: Licensed to Booneville, Mississippi.)	
Tupelo–Starkville–Columbus	WLOV-TV	27	The CW	(Note: Licensed to West Point, Mississippi.)	
Tupelo–Starkville–Columbus	WEPH	49	CTN		
~Alexandria, LA	WNTZ-TV	48	Fox/MyNetworkTV	(Note: Licensed to Natchez, Mississippi.)	
~Memphis, TN	WMAV-TV	18	PBS	(Note: Licensed to Oxford, Mississippi.)	
~Memphis, TN	WWTW	34	Religious independent	(Note: Licensed to Senatobia, Mississippi.)	
~Memphis, TN	WBUY-TV	40	TBN	(Note: Licensed to Holly Springs, Mississippi.)	

== Low-power ==
Low-power television stations in Mississippi
Media market	Station	Channel	Primary affiliation(s)	Notes	Refs
Biloxi	WXVO-LD	7	Antenna TV	(Note: Licensed to Pascagoula, Mississippi.)	
Biloxi	W33EG-D	32	Various	(Note: Licensed to Lumberton, Mississippi.)	
Biloxi	WTBL-LD	51	MeTV		
Greenwood	WHCQ-LD	8	Antenna TV	(Note: Licensed to Cleveland, Mississippi.)	
Greenwood	WPRQ-LD	12	Cozi TV	(Note: Licensed to Clarksdale, Mississippi.)	
Greenwood	WMEL-CD	13	MeTV	(Note: Licensed to Grenada, Mississippi.)	
Greenwood	WXVT-LD	17	CBS		
Greenwood	W19EF-D	19	[Blank]		
Greenwood	WEBU-LD	22	Cozi TV		
Greenwood	WNBD-LD	33	NBC		
Greenwood	WOFF-LD	34	[Blank]		
Hattiesburg–Laurel	WLHA-LD	18	Gulf Coast SEN		
Hattiesburg–Laurel	WHPM-LD	23	Fox, MyNetworkTV/MeTV on 23.3		
Hattiesburg–Laurel	W27EH-D	42	[Blank]		
Jackson	W26BB-D	26	ABN		
Meridian	WOOK-LD	21	Telemundo		
Tupelo–Starkville–Columbus	WCBI-LD	3	Various	(Note: Licensed to Starkville, Mississippi.)	
Tupelo–Starkville–Columbus	W05BV-D	5	Religious independent		
Tupelo–Starkville–Columbus	W22EP-D	22	[Blank]		
Tupelo–Starkville–Columbus	WLMS-LD	25	[Blank]		
Tupelo–Starkville–Columbus	W30ES-D	30	[Blank]		
Tupelo–Starkville–Columbus	WHBH-CD	34	Religious independent		
Tupelo–Starkville–Columbus	WMPJ-LD	34	[Blank]		
Tupelo–Starkville–Columbus	W24EP-D	39	Religious independent	(Note: Licensed to Fulton, Mississippi.)	
Tupelo–Starkville–Columbus	W14EQ-D	40	[Blank]		

== Translators ==
Television station translators in Mississippi
Media market	Station	Channel	Translating	Notes	Refs
Greenwood	W20DW-D	5	WMC-TV		
Hattiesburg–Laurel	W29EY-D	17	WMAU-TV	(Note: Licensed to Columbia, Mississippi.)	

== Defunct ==
- WCOC-TV Meridian (1953–1954)
- WHTV Meridian (1968–1970)
- WKDH Houston (2001–2012)
- WLBT Jackson (1953–1971, license revoked)
- WSLI-TV Jackson (1954–1955, merged with WJTV)

== See also ==
- Mississippi § Media
  - List of newspapers in Mississippi
  - List of radio stations in Mississippi
  - Media of locales in Mississippi: Biloxi, Gulfport, Hattiesburg, Jackson

== Bibliography ==
- "United States TV Stations: Mississippi", Yearbook of Radio and Television, New York: Radio Television Daily, 1964, OCLC 7469377 – via Internet Archive
- Will Norton Jr.; et al. (1992). "Two Comparisons of Rural Public Television Viewers and Nonviewers in Northern Mississippi". Journalism Quarterly. 69 – via University of Nebraska.
