= List of MeTV affiliates =

This is a list of current MeTV affiliates, arranged by U.S. state. There are links to and articles on each of the stations, describing their local programming, hosts and technical information, such as broadcast frequencies. In most markets, MeTV operates on a digital subchannel of the main station listed. In some markets, it operates on an LPTV or Class A station. The network is also available on streaming services Frndly TV and Philo.

== Affiliates ==
Current affiliates for MeTV
Media market	State/Dist./Terr.	Station	Channel
Birmingham–Tuscaloosa–Anniston	Alabama	WVTM-TV	13.2
Dothan	Alabama	WTVY	4.2
Huntsville–Decatur–Florence	Alabama	WZDX	54.3
Mobile	Alabama	WALA-TV	10.7
Selma–Montgomery	Alabama	WAKA	8.2
Anchorage	Alaska	KDMD	33.3
Kingman	Arizona	KMEE-TV	6.1
Phoenix	Arizona	KMEE-LD	40.1
Tucson	Arizona	KOLD-TV	13.2
Fayetteville	Arkansas	KHOG	29.3
Fort Smith	Arkansas	KHBS	40.3
Jonesboro	Arkansas	KJNB-CD	39.3
Jonesboro	Arkansas	KJNE-LD	42.3
Sheridan–Little Rock–Camden	Arkansas	KMYA-DT	49.1
Bakersfield	California	KCBT-LD	34.2
Chico–Redding	California	KHSL-TV	12.7
Fresno–Merced	California	KGMC	43.6
Los Angeles	California	KAZA-TV	54.1
Los Angeles	California	KDOC-TV	56.3
Monterey	California	KMBY-LD	27.1
Palm Springs	California	KMIR-TV	36.2
Palo Alto	California	KTLN-TV	68.2
Sacramento–Stockton–Modesto	California	KCRA-TV	3.2
San Francisco–Oakland–San Jose	California	KPYX	44.3
Colorado Springs–Pueblo	Colorado	KKTV	11.2
Denver	Colorado	KCNC-TV	4.4
Glenwood Springs	Colorado	KREG-TV	3.1
Grand Junction	Colorado	KKCO	11.2
Hartford–New Haven	Connecticut	WHCT-LD	35.1
Washington	District of Columbia	WDME-CD	48.1
Fort Myers	Florida	WZVN-TV	26.2
Gainesville	Florida	WCJB-TV	20.3
Jacksonville	Florida	WFOX-TV	30.2
Miami–Fort Lauderdale	Florida	WPLG	10.2
Orlando	Florida	WESH	2.2
Panama City	Florida	WJHG-TV	7.2
Tallahassee	Florida	WCTV	6.2
Tallahassee	Florida	WFXU	57.2
Tampa–St. Petersburg	Florida	WMOR-TV	32.2
West Palm Beach	Florida	WPBF	25.5
Albany	Georgia	WSST-TV	55.2
Albany	Georgia	WSWG	44.2
Atlanta	Georgia	WGTA	32.1
Atlanta	Georgia	WUPA	69.4
Augusta	Georgia	WRDW-TV	12.3
Macon	Georgia	WPGA-TV	58.1
Savannah	Georgia	WJCL	22.2
Honolulu	Hawaii	KITV	4.2
Boise	Idaho	KNIN-TV	9.2
Idaho Falls–Pocatello	Idaho	KIDK	3.1
Twin Falls	Idaho	KBAX-LD	27.1
Chicago	Illinois	WWME-CD	23.1
Chicago	Illinois	WCIU-TV	26.3
Quincy	Illinois	WGEM-TV	10.4
Peoria–Bloomington	Illinois	WHOI	19.6
Rockford	Illinois	WREX	13.3
Decatur–Springfield	Illinois	WAND (TV)	17.6
Evansville	Indiana	WFIE	14.2
Fort Wayne	Indiana	WISE-TV	33.6
Indianapolis	Indiana	WALV-CD	46.1
Indianapolis	Indiana	WTHR	13.3
Lafayette	Indiana	WPBY-CD	35.2
South Bend	Indiana	WBND-LD	57.2
Terre Haute	Indiana	WTHI-TV	10.3
Davenport	Iowa	KLJB	18.2
Des Moines	Iowa	KCCI	8.2
Sioux City	Iowa	KTIV	4.3
Waterloo	Iowa	KWWL	7.3
Topeka	Kansas	WIBW-TV	13.2
Wichita	Kansas	KAKE	10.2
Bowling Green	Kentucky	WNKY	40.3
Lexington	Kentucky	WKYT-TV	27.4
Louisville	Kentucky	WLKY	32.2
Alexandria	Louisiana	KLAX-TV	31.2
Baton Rouge	Louisiana	WBXH-CD	39.2
Lake Charles	Louisiana	KWWE-LD	19.1
Lafayette	Louisiana	KLWB	50.1
Monroe	Louisiana	KMLU	11.1
New Orleans	Louisiana	WDSU	6.2
Shreveport	Louisiana	KPXJ	21.2
Bangor	Maine	WBGR-LD	18.1
Portland	Maine	WMTW	8.2
Baltimore	Maryland	WBAL-TV	11.2
Salisbury	Maryland	WMDT	47.3
Boston	Massachusetts	WCVB-TV	5.2
Cadillac–Traverse City	Michigan	WWTV	9.3
Lansing	Michigan	WILX-TV	10.2
Detroit	Michigan	WDIV-TV	4.3
Flint–Saginaw–Bay City	Michigan	WJRT-TV	12.2
Grand Rapids	Michigan	WLLA	64.2
Marquette	Michigan	WZMQ	19.1
Duluth	Minnesota	WDIO-DT	10.2
Hibbing	Minnesota	WIRT-DT	13.2
Minneapolis/St. Paul	Minnesota	KSTC-TV	5.3
Biloxi	Mississippi	WTBL-LD	51.1
Columbus–Tupelo	Mississippi	WLOV-TV	27.2
Hattiesburg	Mississippi	WHPM-LD	23.3
Jackson	Mississippi	WAPT	16.2
Meridian	Mississippi	WMDN	24.3
Cape Girardeau	Missouri	KFVS-TV	12.4
Columbia–Jefferson City	Missouri	KMIZ	17.2
Joplin	Missouri	KOAM	7.3
Kansas City	Missouri	KMBC-TV	9.2
St. Louis	Missouri	KNLC	24.1
Springfield	Missouri	K26GS-D	26.2
Springfield	Missouri	KSPR-LD	33.3
Springfield	Missouri	KXMP-LD	8
Billings	Montana	KINV-LD	14.1
Great Falls	Montana	KJJC-TV	16.1
Lincoln	Nebraska	KSNB-TV	4.2
North Platte	Nebraska	KNPL-LD	10.2
Omaha	Nebraska	KETV	7.2
Reno	Nevada	KOLO-TV	8.2
Tonopah-Las Vegas	Nevada	KBWT	9.1
Manchester	New Hampshire	WMUR-TV	9.2
Albuquerque	New Mexico	KOB	4.3
Albany	New York	WNYT	13.2
Binghamton	New York	WBNG-TV	12.3
Buffalo	New York	WBBZ-TV	67.1
New York City	New York	WJLP	33.1
Rochester	New York	WHEC-TV	10.2
Plattsburgh	New York	WPTZ	5.3
Syracuse	New York	WMJQ-CD	40.1
Utica	New York	WKTV	2.4
Watertown	New York	WNYF-CD	28.2
Charlotte	North Carolina	WCCB	18.3
Greensboro–Winston-Salem	North Carolina	WXII-TV	12.2
Raleigh	North Carolina	WRAZ	50.2
Greenville–New Bern	North Carolina	WITN-TV	7.3
Wilmington	North Carolina	WILM-LD	10.2
Bismarck	North Dakota	KFYR-TV	5.3
Dickinson	North Dakota	KQCD-TV	7.3
Fargo	North Dakota	KVLY-TV	11.3
Minot	North Dakota	KMOT	10.3
Williston	North Dakota	KUMV-TV	8.3
Cincinnati	Ohio	WLWT	5.2
Cleveland	Ohio	WOIO	19.2
Columbus	Ohio	WBNS-TV	10.2
Dayton	Ohio	WHIO-TV	7.2
Toledo	Ohio	WTVG	13.3
Lawton	Oklahoma	KSWO-TV	7.3
Oklahoma City	Oklahoma	KOCO-TV	5.2
Tulsa	Oklahoma	KOKI-TV	23.2
Eugene	Oregon	KEZI	9.2
Medford	Oregon	KMVU-DT	26.2
Portland	Oregon	KJYY-LD	29.3
Salem	Oregon	KJWY-LD	21.3
Erie	Pennsylvania	WICU-TV	12.2
Lancaster	Pennsylvania	WGAL	8.2
Philadelphia	Pennsylvania	WDPN-TV	2.1
Philadelphia	Pennsylvania	WFMZ-TV	69.3
Pittsburgh	Pennsylvania	WPXI	11.2
Wilkes-Barre–Scranton	Pennsylvania	WSWB	38.2
Providence	Rhode Island	WLNE-TV	6.5
Ceiba–Fajardo	Puerto Rico	W18DZ-D	18.1
Charleston	South Carolina	WGWG	4.1
Columbia	South Carolina	WOLO-TV	25.4
Myrtle Beach	South Carolina	WFXB	43.4
Greenville(Spartanburg)	South Carolina	WYFF	4.2
Lead	South Dakota	KQME	5.1
Rapid City	South Dakota	KHME	23.1
Sioux Falls/Mitchell	South Dakota	KSFY-TV	13.3
Chattanooga	Tennessee	WFLI-TV	53.3
Jackson	Tennessee	WBBJ-TV	7.4
Kingsport	Tennessee	WAPK-CD	36.1
Knoxville	Tennessee	WBIR-TV	10.2
Memphis	Tennessee	WLMT	30.2
Nashville	Tennessee	WJFB	44.1
Amarillo	Texas	KFDA-TV	10.4
Austin	Texas	KTBC	7.4
Beaumont	Texas	KBMT	12.4
Corpus Christi	Texas	KIII	3.2
Fort Worth–Dallas	Texas	KAZD	55.2
Houston	Texas	KYAZ	51.1
Laredo	Texas	KLMV-LD	15.1
Lubbock	Texas	KLBB-LD	48.1
Midland–Odessa	Texas	KWWT	30.2
San Antonio	Texas	KSAT-TV	12.2
Tyler	Texas	KYTX	19.3
Waco	Texas	KWTX-TV	10.3
Weslaco	Texas	KRGV-TV	5.3
St. George	Utah	KCSG	8.1
Charlottesville	Virginia	WVAW-LD	16.2
Harrisonburg	Virginia	WHSV-TV	3.4
Norfolk	Virginia	WVEC	13.3
Richmond	Virginia	WWBT	12.2
Roanoke	Virginia	WSLS-TV	10.3
Bellingham	Washington	KVOS-TV	12.3
Kennewick	Washington	KVEW	42.2
Seattle	Washington	KFFV	44.1
Spokane	Washington	KXLY-TV	4.2
Yakima	Washington	KAPP	35.2
Beckley	West Virginia	WVVA	6.3
Fairmont–Clarksburg–Weston	West Virginia	WDTV	5.2
Huntington–Charleston	West Virginia	WSAZ-TV	3.2
Parkersburg	West Virginia	WIYE-LD	47.2
Eau Claire	Wisconsin	WEAU	13.3
Green Bay	Wisconsin	WMEI	31.1
Madison	Wisconsin	WMTV	15.4
Milwaukee	Wisconsin	WBME-CD	41.1
Milwaukee	Wisconsin	WDJT-TV	58.2
Wausau	Wisconsin	WZAW-LD	33.2
Wausau	Wisconsin	WSAW-TV	7.2
Casper	Wyoming	KFNB	20.2
Cheyenne	Wyoming	KLWY	27.3

== See also ==
- List of programs broadcast by MeTV
