= Pine Belt (Mississippi) =

Region in southeast Mississippi

Coordinates: 31.122799°N 88.936746°W

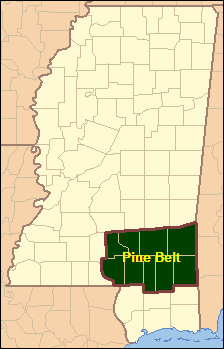
Map of the Pine Belt Region with associated counties in green

The Pine Belt, also known as the Piney Woods, is a region in Southeast Mississippi. The region gets its name from the longleaf pine trees that are abundant in the region. The Pine Belt includes nine counties: Covington, Forrest, Greene, Jefferson Davis, Jones, Lamar, Marion, Perry, and Wayne.

== History ==
Before the arrival of Europeans, the area that would later become the state of Mississippi was populated by several Native American tribes, including the Natchez and Pascagoula in the Pine Belt. The native population declined as a result of armed conflicts with the Europeans, attrition from diseases, or coalescence with other tribes.

In 1817, the western portion of the Mississippi Territory was admitted to the Union as the State of Mississippi. Yet, the vast longleaf pine resource in Mississippi's Pine Belt remained mostly undisturbed, because there was no efficient system for transporting cut timber to sawmills for processing into lumber. That changed in the late 1800s, when railroads were built throughout the Pine Belt. These railroads provided an inexpensive means for moving passengers as well as logs and lumber, and opened Mississippi's Pine Belt to both industrial growth and community development. Notable railway construction during this era included the Gulf and Ship Island Railroad; New Orleans and Northeastern Railroad; and the Mobile, Jackson and Kansas City Railroad. The Pine Belt's booming timber industry ended around 1930, when the virgin pine forests were depleted.

As World War I raged in Europe, military training sites were being created throughout the United States. As part of that effort, one of those training sites was established in the Pine Belt south of Hattiesburg in 1917. Over time, that training site transformed into Camp Shelby Joint Forces Training Center. Camp Shelby is the largest state owned military training facility in the U.S. and covers more than 134,000 acres (54,000 ha).

== Geography ==
As of 2020, Mississippi's Pine Belt had a population of 306,672 and an area of about 5,200 mi^{2} (13,400 km^{2}). In the U.S. House of Representatives, the area is split between Mississippi's 3rd and 4th congressional districts.

=== Principal cities and towns ===
The following are the 10 most populous cities and towns in the region.

City or town	County	Population (2020 census)
Hattiesburg	Forrest (county seat), Lamar	48,730
Laurel	Jones (county seat)	17,161
Petal	Forrest	11,010
Columbia	Marion (county seat)	5,864
Ellisville	Jones (county seat)	4,652
Waynesboro	Wayne (county seat)	4,567
Leakesville	Greene (county seat)	3,775
Collins	Covington (county seat)	2,342
Purvis	Lamar (county seat)	1,909
Sumrall	Lamar	1,765

== Education ==
Universities

- University of Southern Mississippi
- William Carey University

Community colleges

- Copiah–Lincoln Community College
- Jones College
- Pearl River Community College
- Southwest Mississippi Community College

== Media ==
Newspapers, magazines, and journals

- Hattiesburg American
- Laurel Leader-Call

Television

- Hattiesburg - WDAM 7
- Hattiesburg - WHLT 22
- Hattiesburg - WHPM 23

== Transportation ==
Airports

- Hattiesburg–Laurel Regional Airport

Interstates

- Interstate 55
- Interstate 59

Highways

- U.S. Highway 11
- U.S. Highway 49
- U.S. Highway 84
- U.S. Highway 98

== Notable people ==
- Toby Barker, politician
- Shane Barnett, politician
- Elizabeth Bass, physician, educator and suffragist
- Dawn H. Beam, judge
- Larry Byrd, politician
- Lacey Chabert, actress
- Martin Sennet Conner, former Governor of Mississippi
- Kermit Davis, basketball coach
- Dennis DeBar, politician
- Bo Diddley, guitarist
- Johnny DuPree, politician
- Brett Favre, football player
- Joey Fillingane, politician
- Ed Freeman, Medal of Honor recipient
- Dale Goodin, politician
- Billy Hudson, politician
- Ray J, singer and actor
- Chris Johnson, politician
- Paul B. Johnson Jr., former Governor of Mississippi
- Paul B. Johnson Sr., former Governor of Mississippi
- Mack A. Jordan, Medal of Honor recipient
- Kent McCarty, politician
- Chris McDaniel, politician
- Missy McGee, politician
- Steve McNair, football player
- Gerald McRaney, actor
- Mary Mills, professional golfer
- Marilyn Mims, operatic soprano
- J. Ed Morgan, politician
- Felecia M. Nave, chemical engineer and academic administrator
- Walter Payton, football player
- John A. Polk, politician
- Leontyne Price, soprano
- Johnny Rawls, soul blues singer, songwriter
- Robin Robinson, politician
- Noah Sanford, politician
- Donnie Scoggin, politician
- Omeria Scott, politician
- Taylor Spreitler, actress
- James Street, journalist and novelist
- Joseph Tubb, politician
- L. C. Ulmer, delta blues musician
- Ray Walston, actor and comedian
- Percy Watson, politician
- Hugh L. White, former Governor of Mississippi

== See also ==
- List of belt regions of the United States
- Mississippi Gulf Coast
- Piney Woods
