= Fox 30 =

Fox 30 may refer to one of the following television stations in the United States affiliated with the Fox Broadcasting Company:

== Current ==
- WFOX-TV in Jacksonville, Florida
- WGBC in Meridian, Mississippi

== Former ==
- KCVU in Paradise/Chico/Redding, California (1994–2008, now on channel 20)
- WCAY-TV/WXMT (now WUXP-TV) in Nashville, Tennessee (1986–1990)
- WMKW-TV/WLMT in Memphis, Tennessee (1986–1990)
