= Gulf Coast Sports & Entertainment Network =

- Country: United States
- Broadcast area: Louisiana; Mississippi; Alabama
- Headquarters: New Orleans, Louisiana, U.S.

Programming
- Language: English
- Picture format: 720p (HDTV); 480i (SDTV)

Ownership
- Owner: Gray Media
- Sister channels: Arizona's Family Sports; Peachtree Sports Network

History
- Launched: October 2, 2024
- Replaced: Bally Sports New Orleans

Links
- Website: www.fox8live.com/page/pelicans/

Availability

Streaming media
- FuboTV: Internet Protocol television

Gulf Coast Sports & Entertainment Network (GCSEN) is a broadcast television regional sports network in the U.S. states of Alabama, Louisiana and Mississippi, owned by Gray Media. The network is the broadcast home for the New Orleans Pelicans of the National Basketball Association.

The network launched on October 2, 2024.

== History ==
On March 14, 2023, Diamond Sports Group, the parent company of Bally Sports New Orleans (the previous television home of the Pelicans), filed for Chapter 11 bankruptcy, 30 days after they failed to make a $140M interest payment. As part of the bankruptcy, during the 2023–24 NBA season, Bally Sports reached an agreement with the NBA to allow teams to exclusively air up to 10 games on local over-the-air networks. The Pelicans reached an agreement with Gray Television for its over-the-air games. On August 23, 2024, Diamond Sports rejected its contract with the Pelicans through bankruptcy court.

On September 17, 2024, the Pelicans announced that Gray Television would become the exclusive home of local Pelicans games beginning with the 2024–25 NBA season. In order to air games across Louisiana, Mississippi and Alabama, Gray announced that all games would air on the soon-to-launch Gulf Coast Sports & Entertainment Network, which would mostly be available on digital subchannels. The network launched on October 2, 2024.

On January 13, 2025, it would be announced by Gray Media, in partnership with Major League Rugby, that the New Orleans Gold would broadcast their games exclusively on the Gulf Coast Sports Network throughout the 2025 season onward, airing all 16 of the Gold’s home and away games.

Prior to the 2025 MLB season, Gray Media announced agreements with the Atlanta Braves and Texas Rangers to air 15 games, 10 additional spring training games for the Braves and 4 for the Rangers, over-the-air. Braves games (produced by FanDuel Sports Network South) will air on the Gulf Coast Sports Network in Biloxi, Birmingham, Hattiesburg, Jackson, Mobile and Montgomery. Rangers games (produced by the Rangers Sports Network) will air on the Gulf Coast Sports Network in Alexandria. Gray also announced an agreement with the Biloxi Shuckers of Minor League Baseball to air 12 games.

In June 2025, Gray Media announced an extension to its agreement with the New Orleans Saints of the National Football League (WVUE had been acquired from its former owner, late Saints/Pelicans owner Tom Benson, in 2017, continuing a long-standing team relationship). Gulf Coast Sports & Entertainment Network will rebroadcast pregame shows and air a new slate of studio shows before and after Saints games. That same month, the network announced a programming agreement with Locked On Podcast Network.

== Carriage ==
The network is primarily available on local over-the-air stations, along with DirecTV, Cox Cable, Fubo TV and Mediacom.

=== Over-the-air affiliates ===
City of license / Market	Station	Virtual channel	Primary affiliation (on main channel)
Alexandria, Louisiana	KLGC-LD	25.2	The CW
Alexandria, Louisiana	KALB-TV	5.4	NBC
Baton Rouge, Louisiana	WAFB	9.3	CBS
Biloxi, Mississippi	WTBL-LD	51.3	MeTV
Biloxi, Mississippi	WLOX	13.6	ABC
Birmingham, Alabama	WBRC	6.3	Fox
Hattiesburg, Mississippi	WLHA-LD	18.2	Telemundo
Hattiesburg, Mississippi	WDAM-TV	7.5	NBC
Jackson, Mississippi	WLBT	3.3	NBC
Iowa–Lafayette, Louisiana	KNGC-LD	25.1	N/A
Lafayette, Louisiana	KATC	3.2	ABC
Lake Charles, Louisiana	KGCH-LD	32.1	N/A
Meridian, Mississippi	WOOK-LD	15.5	Telemundo
Meridian, Mississippi	WTOK-TV	11.5	ABC
Mobile, Alabama	WALA-TV	10.5	Fox
Monroe, Louisiana	KCWL-LD	24.1	N/A
Monroe, Louisiana	KNOE-TV	8.3	CBS
Montgomery, Alabama	WSFA	12.3	NBC
New Orleans, Louisiana	WVUE-DT	7.1	Fox
New Orleans, Louisiana	WVUE-DT	8.3	Fox
Shreveport, Louisiana	KSLA	12.2	CBS
