= Senator Gandy =

Senator Gandy may refer to:

- Harry Gandy (1881–1957), South Dakota State Senate
- Phillip A. Gandy (born 1950), Mississippi State Senate
