= Senator Dickerson (disambiguation) =

Mahlon Dickerson (1770–1853) was a U.S. Senator from New Jersey. Senator Dickerson may also refer to:

- Jason Dickerson (fl. 2020s), Georgia State Senate
- Larry Dickerson (1956–2002), Oklahoma State Senate
- Steven Dickerson (fl. 2010s), Tennessee State Senate
- Tommy Dickerson (born 1945), Mississippi State Senate
- William W. Dickerson (1851–1923), Kentucky State Senate
