= NBC 24 =

NBC 24 may refer to one of the following television stations in the United States:

== Current ==
- KNVN in Chico-Redding, California
- KSEE in Fresno, California
- WNWO-TV in Toledo, Ohio

== Former ==
- KFTA-TV in Fort Smith, Arkansas (1980–2008)
- WHTV (now WMDN) in Meridian, Mississippi (1972–1980)
  - Was a satellite of WTVA in Tupelo, Mississippi
