= Senator Walley =

Senator Walley may refer to:

- Columbus W. Walley (1876–1936), Mississippi State Senate
- James Walley (born 1973/74), Mississippi State Senate
- Page Walley (born 1957), Tennessee State Senate
