= WeatherVision =

Weather television syndication company

WeatherVision is a TV syndication company based in Pascagoula, Mississippi. WeatherVision produces and distributes customized weather forecast segments for local airing by over 200 commercial and public television (and radio) stations nationwide. The forecasts are custom-produced for each TV station providing weather information for that station's broadcast area, complete with the station's own on-screen branding and logos.

Before moving to Pascagoula, Mississippi in 2016, Weathervision operated through a satellite uplink service in Jackson, Mississippi. Known as the Jackson Teleport, WeatherVision's satellite uplink and studio apparatus was Mississippi's first satellite uplink studio unit. For over 20 years, Jackson Teleport served all major networks, including CNN, FOX, CBS, CNBC, and others with live satellite guest shots. The Teleport moved to Pascagoula along with WeatherVision.

WeatherVision has a unique marketing premise. The company accepts partial payment in spot inventory from client stations and then networks this spot inventory into a saleable media network which it then re-sells at bulk pricing to its own advertising clients.

The company was founded by Edward Saint Pé in 1991 as a turn-key provider of weather broadcasts for local and regional television stations that do not have the means necessary to produce their own weather broadcasts, due to cost, market size, or other factors. The company is now based at flagshipped WXVO-LD in Pascagoula, a low-power independent TV station owned by Saint Pé.

A staff of meteorologists present the forecasts which are produced daily with the receiving station's own branding (as well as the station being mentioned by the meteorologist). Then the produced forecasts are fed via satellite or FTP to the local stations receiving WeatherVision's forecasts, and then integrated into that station's local programming.

Presently WeatherVision serves over 220 stations, some affiliates taking local weather content, while others take a national weather report re-fed via one of the national networks which subscribe to the service.

WeatherVision has no relation with Tampa, Florida's WTVT (then a CBS affiliate, now a Fox owned-and-operated station), whose computer-generated weather maps in the 1970s and 1980s were branded "Weathervision".
