= List of programs broadcast by MeTV =

The following is a list of programs broadcast on MeTV, a classic television network carried on digital subchannels of over-the-air broadcast stations, live streaming, satellite TV, and cable TV in the United States. This list does not include runs on MeTV's local stations in Chicago and Milwaukee before December 2010.

== Current programming ==
=== Original programming ===
| Title | Premiere Date | Current Season | Note(s) |
|---|---|---|---|
| Collector's Call | April 7, 2019 | 6 | |
| Svengoolie | April 2, 2011 | 15 | |
| Toon In with Me | January 1, 2021 | 5 | |
| House of Svengoolie | October 1, 2022 | 4 | |

=== Sitcoms ===
| Title | Premiere date | Finale date(s) | Note(s) |
|---|---|---|---|
| All in the Family | January 12, 1971 | April 8, 1979 | |
| The Andy Griffith Show | October 3, 1960 | April 1, 1968 | |
| The Beverly Hillbillies | September 26, 1962 | March 23, 1971 | |
| The Brady Bunch | September 26, 1969 | March 8, 1974 | |
| The Dick Van Dyke Show | October 3, 1961 | June 1, 1966 | |
| Everybody Loves Raymond | September 13, 1996 | May 16, 2005 | |
| Gilligan's Island | September 26, 1964 | April 17, 1967 | |
| The Golden Girls | September 14, 1985 | May 9, 1992 | |
| Hogan's Heroes | September 17, 1965 | April 4, 1971 | |
| The Honeymooners | October 1, 1955 | September 22, 1956 | |
| I Love Lucy | October 15, 1951 | May 6, 1957 | |
| Leave It to Beaver | October 2, 1957 | June 20, 1963 | |
| The Love Boat | September 24, 1977 | May 24, 1986 | |
| Mama's Family | January 22, 1983 | February 24, 1990 | |
| M*A*S*H (TV series) | September 17, 1972 | February 28, 1983 | |
| Petticoat Junction | September 24, 1963 | April 4, 1970 | |
| The Three Stooges | 1922 | 1970 | |

MeTV+

- ALF
- Bob
- Bosom Buddies
- Car 54, Where Are You?
- Comedy Classics (including The Three Stooges, Laurel and Hardy, and The Little Rascals)
- The Danny Thomas Show
- Love, American Style
- Mayberry R.F.D.
- Our Miss Brooks
- That Girl

=== Drama ===
- Adam-12
- Barnaby Jones
- Cannon
- Dragnet
- Emergency!
- Fantasy Island (Note: Airs on both MeTV and MeTV+.)
- The Fugitive
- Harry O
- Hawaii Five-O
- Mannix
- Matlock
- Mission: Impossible
- Perry Mason
- The Waltons

MeTV+

- Beauty and the Beast
- Charlie's Angels
- Diagnosis: Murder
- Family
- Father Dowling Mysteries
- Flashpoint
- Hardcastle and McCormick
- Hart to Hart
- Highlander
- Hunter
- Joan of Arcadia
- The Mod Squad
- N.Y.P.D.
- Police Story
- Police Woman
- Promised Land
- The Rookies
- Route 66
- S.W.A.T.
- T.J. Hooker
- Twin Peaks

=== Science fiction ===
- The Green Hornet
- The Invaders
- Kolchak: The Night Stalker
- Land of the Giants
- Lost in Space
- Star Trek
- Voyage to the Bottom of the Sea

MeTV+

- The Greatest American Hero
- One Step Beyond
- The Pretender
- Sheena
- The New Twilight Zone

=== Westerns ===
- The Big Valley
- Bonanza
- Gunsmoke
- Have Gun – Will Travel
- The Life and Times of Grizzly Adams
- Rawhide
- The Rifleman
- Wagon Train
- Wanted Dead or Alive
- The Wild Wild West

=== Anthology ===
- Alfred Hitchcock Presents
- The Twilight Zone

=== Variety ===
- Carol Burnett and Friends

=== Animated ===
- Bugs Bunny and Friends
- Popeye and Pals
- The Tom & Jerry Show (including other MGM Cartoons such as Droopy, Barney Bear, and Screwball Squirrel)
- The Woody Woodpecker Show (including Woody Woodpecker, Chilly Willy, The Beary Family, Inspector Willoughby, Andy Panda, and more)

=== E/I ===
- Mutual of Omaha's Wild Kingdom

MeTV+

- DragonflyTV
- The Science Zone
- State to State
- The World Is Yours

== Former programming ==
=== Sitcoms ===
- The Addams Family
- ALF
- Bewitched
- The Bob Newhart Show
- Bosom Buddies
- Car 54, Where Are You?
- Cheers
- The Donna Reed Show
- The Danny Thomas Show
- Dennis the Menace
- Diff'rent Strokes
- F Troop
- The Facts of Life
- Family Affair
- Full House
- Get Smart
- Good Times
- Green Acres
- Gimme a Break!
- Gidget
- Gomer Pyle, U.S.M.C.
- Happy Days
- The Jeffersons
- I Dream of Jeannie
- Laurel and Hardy
- Laverne & Shirley
- The Little Rascals
- Love, American Style
- The Lucy–Desi Comedy Hour
- The Lucy Show
- The Many Loves of Dobie Gillis
- The Mary Tyler Moore Show
- Maude
- Mayberry R.F.D.
- McHale's Navy
- Mister Ed
- The Monkees
- Mork & Mindy
- The Mothers-in-Law
- My Three Sons
- The Odd Couple
- Our Miss Brooks
- The Patty Duke Show
- The Phil Silvers Show
- Rhoda
- The Rogues
- Sledge Hammer!
- Silver Spoons
- Taxi
- That Girl
- Welcome Back, Kotter
- WKRP in Cincinnati

=== Original ===
- Sventoonie

=== Variety ===
- The Best of the Ed Sullivan Show

=== Drama ===
- 12 O'Clock High
- 77 Sunset Strip
- The A-Team
- Banacek
- Black Sheep Squadron
- Burke's Law
- CHiPs
- Charlie’s Angels
- Columbo
- Combat!
- Daniel Boone
- Diagnosis: Murder
- The Hardy Boys/Nancy Drew Mysteries
- Hart to Hart
- Honey West
- Highway Patrol
- In the Heat of the Night
- Ironside
- Knight Rider
- Kojak
- MacGyver
- The Man from U.N.C.L.E.
- McCloud
- McMillan & Wife
- Miami Vice
- The Mod Squad
- Monk
- Mr. Lucky
- Naked City
- Perry Mason: The TV Movies
- Peter Gunn
- Quincy, M.E.
- Remington Steele
- The Rockford Files
- Route 66
- The Saint
- The Streets of San Francisco
- T.J. Hooker
- Touched by an Angel
- The Untouchables

=== Science fiction ===
- Adventures of Superman
- Batman
- Battlestar Galactica
- Buck Rogers in the 25th Century
- The Incredible Hulk
- The Outer Limits
- H.G. Wells Invisible Man
- Planet of the Apes
- The Powers of Matthew Star
- Thunderbirds
- The Time Tunnel
- Swamp Thing
- Wonder Woman

=== Westerns ===
- Bat Masterson
- Branded
- The Guns of Will Sonnett
- Maverick
- The Rebel
- Trackdown
- Stagecoach West

MeTV+

- The Adventures of Jim Bowie
- Alias Smith and Jones
- Branded
- Broken Arrow
- Bronco
- The Californians
- Colt .45
- Guns of Paradise
- The Guns of Will Sonnett
- How the West Was Won
- Iron Horse
- Lancer
- The Life and Legend of Wyatt Earp
- Lawman
- Maverick
- The Restless Gun
- Stagecoach West
- Sugarfoot

=== Anthology ===
- The Alfred Hitchcock Hour
- Night Gallery
- Thriller
- The Twilight Zone

=== Animated / children's programming ===
- Beakman's World
- Bill Nye the Science Guy
- Edgemont
- The Flintstones
- Green Screen Adventures
- Gumby
- H.R. Pufnstuf
- He-Man and the Masters of the Universe
- The Jetsons
- Land of the Lost
- Mr. Magoo
- Mystery Hunters
- Pink Panther’s Party
- Saved by the Bell
- Saved by the Bell: The College Years
- She-Ra: Princess of Power

MeTV+

- Sunday Night Cartoons

== Current programming available online ==
- The Donna Reed Show
- The Lucy Show
