= WHLT =

Television station in Hattiesburg, Mississippi

Semi-satellite of WJTV, Jackson, Mississippi
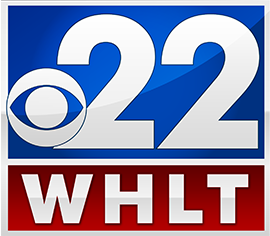

- Hattiesburg–Laurel, Mississippi; United States
- City: Hattiesburg, Mississippi
- Channels: Digital: 22 (UHF); Virtual: 22
- Branding: WHLT 22

Programming
- Affiliations: 22.1: CBS; 22.2: The CW Plus; for others, see § Subchannels

Ownership
- Owner: Nexstar Media Group; (Nexstar Media Inc.)
- Sister stations: WJTV

History
- First air date: January 12, 1987
- Former call signs: WLHT (CP, 1981–1984)
- Former channel numbers: Analog: 22 (UHF, 1987–2009); Digital: 58 (UHF, until 2009)
- Call sign meaning: Hattiesburg–Laurel Television

Technical information
- Licensing authority: FCC
- Facility ID: 48668
- ERP: 1,000 kW
- HAAT: 243 m (797 ft)
- Transmitter coordinates: 31°24′19.4″N 89°14′14.8″W

Links
- Public license information: Public file; LMS
- Website: www.wjtv.com/pine-belt-news/

WHLT (channel 22) is a television station in Hattiesburg, Mississippi, United States, affiliated with CBS and The CW Plus and owned by Nexstar Media Group. It is a semi-satellite of WJTV (channel 12) in Jackson. WHLT has studios in the Cloverleaf Center on US 49 in Hattiesburg; its transmitter is located in unincorporated northeastern Forrest County.

WHLT began broadcasting on January 12, 1987, culminating nearly seven years in efforts and conflicts over bringing a quality CBS signal to the Pine Belt. A dispute between the owners of WJTV and WHTV in Meridian, both CBS affiliates, and a contested consulting agreement meant that the station was not fully approved until 1986. Though it has often functioned as a news bureau for WJTV, full local newscasts have originated from Hattiesburg twice in WHLT's history. The first effort, from 1988 to 1996, eventually included fully separate newscasts. After Media General acquired WJTV and WHLT in 1997, it relocated WHLT to Cloverleaf Center and relaunched local news as 22 Daily News, airing from 1999 to 2001. Both news operations suffered from low ratings against the established and dominant WDAM-TV. WHLT retained the CBS affiliation after WJTV lost the network in 2026.

== History ==
=== Capitol vs. Central: Filling the CBS gap ===
Prior to WHLT, the Pine Belt of Mississippi was poorly served by CBS. The four closest CBS affiliates to Hattiesburg—WJTV in Jackson, WHTV in Meridian, WWL-TV in New Orleans, and WKRG-TV in Mobile—all had signals that failed to provide at least a Grade B signal to the city proper. Reception of WJTV via Hattiesburg's cable system was equally suspect. CBS accused the cable company of using a direct satellite feed to offer Super Bowl XVIII in lieu of the rebroadcast of the affiliate, and it decided in 1986 to replace WJTV with WKRG. Though viewers lost Mississippi news and advertising, the picture on CBS programs was substantially improved.

During this time, two of the other CBS affiliates were vying to build a TV station in the Pine Belt. In February 1980, Capitol Broadcasting Company, owner of WJTV, filed with the Federal Communications Commission (FCC) to build channel 18 in Laurel as a full-time satellite station of the Jackson outlet. On July 17, Central Television—the owner of WHTV—applied for channel 22 in Hattiesburg. It proposed a full-service station with local programs from the outset. Central was the first to get a construction permit, on December 9, 1980, and took the call sign WLHT; this was modified in 1984 to WHLT, coinciding with the grant of the WLHT call sign to a Michigan radio station.

Central and Capitol had applications that were essentially exclusive, since each was dependent on providing CBS programming. No other network affiliation was available in the area; WDAM-TV (channel 7) was the NBC affiliate, while the ABC affiliation was covered by WLOX in Biloxi. Central filed a petition to deny the Capitol application at the FCC. In July 1982, Capitol won its construction permit for channel 18, which was given the call sign WJLH. Capitol had not previously been eligible to win a construction permit until the 40-percent owner Mississippi Publishers Corporation sold their stakes in the Hattiesburg American and two daily newspapers in Jackson. Central appealed the decision to the full commission and lost in a 6–1 vote. It also unsuccessfully sued in civil court.

By the time Capitol's channel 18 application was upheld, the company was in the middle of selling its stations. The News-Press & Gazette Company (NPG) of St. Joseph, Missouri, agreed to buy WJTV in December 1982. Under the subsidiary Broadcasters of Mississippi, the purchase included the Laurel construction permit. In November 1984, NPG reached a deal with Central and its owner, Frank K. Spain, under which NPG would acquire the Hattiesburg channel 22 permit (WHLT) and Spain would drop all appeals in exchange for a four-year, $475,000 consulting contract. WJTV management noted that Hattiesburg was larger and growing, compared to Laurel. NPG justified the contract by noting that it had never built a new TV station and needed Spain's expertise. WDAM-TV filed a petition to deny because it believed the consulting agreement violated FCC rules that limited the price for which construction permits could be sold. While it permitted the sale in July 1986, the commission agreed with WDAM-TV and limited the purchase price to $100,000 in actual costs.

=== Early years ===
WHLT began broadcasting from its transmitter located on US 11 on January 12, 1987. It had local studios and offices at 990 Hardy Street in Hattiesburg and began contributing local news reports from the area for incorporation in WJTV's newscasts from Jackson. Separate weather forecasts were also inserted into the newscasts. The cable system added WHLT three months later. In the years that followed, the station began offering local newscasts, starting with morning news cut-ins. On September 12, 1988, WHLT began offering a 6 p.m. newscast originating from Hattiesburg and a 10 p.m. report mixing Hattiesburg news and content from WJTV. The morning cut-ins were discontinued in June 1989 due to low ratings. In 1991, WHLT began producing its own 10 p.m. newscast and added six employees to its news department.

New Vision Television acquired all eight of NPG's stations for $110 million in 1993. The company of East Lansing, Michigan, and Atlanta was a newly formed entity. Within 18 months, New Vision's investors were ready to sell and flipped the same portfolio to Ellis Communications for $220 million.

WHLT struggled to make headway in a market dominated by WDAM. In February 1995, Nielsen found that WHLT's 6 p.m. news had a 7% audience share compared to 66% for WDAM. Effective January 29, 1996, WHLT's separate newscasts were discontinued, and the station began airing an eight-minute 10 p.m. newscast, 22 News Now, as well as WJTV's morning and noon newscasts and news and weather updates recorded in Jackson.

=== Media General ownership and 22 Daily News ===
Raycom Media acquired Ellis on May 14, 1996, and Federal Broadcasting on May 30. Federal owned WDAM, so Raycom had to divest one of the two stations. In January 1997, WHLT and WJTV, along with WSAV-TV in Savannah, Georgia, were traded to Media General for WTVR-TV in Richmond, Virginia, which it had just purchased but could not retain alongside the Richmond Times-Dispatch.

Media General took a new look at Hattiesburg. In October 1998, it announced that the station would relocate to the city's Cloverleaf Mall and air local news on weeknights. The station occupied the former Stuart's clothing store at Cloverleaf, which was in the process of converting into a mixed power center and office development, having lost many stores and anchors to the Turtle Creek Mall in 1994. Its new space featured windows looking into the news studio. 22 Daily News debuted on April 5, 1999, with 6 and 10 p.m. newscasts on weeknights.

Much like WHLT's first effort in local news, 22 Daily News failed to attract sufficient viewership competing with WDAM. Media General discontinued the news department effective March 30, 2001. Days later, the Mississippi Associated Press Broadcasters Association awarded WHLT for best small-market newscast in Mississippi for 2000. In 2007, WHLT resumed producing news inserts into WJTV's newscasts. Two years later, it converted to digital broadcasting and discontinued its analog signal.

As part of a long-term affiliation renewal with The CW, Media General announced on December 23, 2014, that WHLT would add the network to a digital subchannel.

=== Nexstar ownership ===
Media General initially agreed to merge with the Meredith Corporation but faced a shareholder revolt in the wake of an unsolicited offer from Nexstar Broadcasting Group, which agreed to acquire the company in January 2016. The sale was completed on January 17, 2017, at which time Nexstar changed its name to Nexstar Media Group.

In 2017, simulcasts of WJTV's noon and 5 p.m. newscasts were added to the WHLT lineup.

While WJTV lost its CBS affiliation in Jackson to a digital subchannel of WAPT on August 1, 2026, WHLT retained the CBS affiliation for the Hattiesburg–Laurel market and continued to carry WJTV's newscasts.

== Subchannels ==
WHLT's transmitter is located in unincorporated northeastern Forrest County. The station's signal is multiplexed:

Subchannels of WHLT
Subchannel	Res.	Short name	Programming
22.1	1080i	WHLT-HD	CBS
22.2	720p	CW+	The CW Plus
22.3	480i	ION	Ion
22.4	480i	ESCAPE	Ion Mystery
