= WLOX =

Television station in Biloxi, Mississippi

- Biloxi–Gulfport–; Pascagoula, Mississippi; United States
- City: Biloxi, Mississippi
- Channels: Digital: 32 (UHF); Virtual: 13
- Branding: WLOX (general); WLOX ABC (13.1); WLOX CBS (13.2); WLOX News Now

Programming
- Affiliations: 13.1: ABC; 13.2: CBS; for others, see § Subchannels

Ownership
- Owner: Gray Media; (Gray Television Licensee, LLC)
- Sister stations: WTBL-LD

History
- First air date: October 15, 1962
- Former call signs: WLOX-TV (1979–2003)
- Former channel numbers: Analog: 13 (VHF, 1962–2009); Digital: 39 (UHF, until 2018)
- Call sign meaning: Biloxi

Technical information
- Licensing authority: FCC
- Facility ID: 13995
- ERP: 525 kW
- HAAT: 397 m (1,302 ft)
- Transmitter coordinates: 30°43′23″N 89°5′28″W

Links
- Public license information: Public file; LMS
- Website: www.wlox.com

WLOX (channel 13) is a television station licensed to Biloxi, Mississippi, United States, serving the Mississippi Gulf Coast as an affiliate of ABC and CBS. It is owned by Gray Media alongside low-power MeTV/Telemundo affiliate WTBL-LD (channel 51). The two stations share studios on DeBuys Road in Biloxi; WLOX's transmitter is located in unincorporated southern Stone County near McHenry.

== History ==
WLOX was the first television station on the Mississippi Gulf Coast, having begun operations October 15, 1962. It was owned by the Love family and their WLOX Broadcasting Company along with WLOX radio (AM 1490, now WANG). The station immediately aligned with ABC, an unusual move at the time for what, then as now, was a very small market. ABC was not nearly on par with CBS and NBC in terms of size and ratings until the 1970s. WVUE-TV in New Orleans had been on channel 13, and shifted to channel 12 (it did not move to its current channel 8 until 1970) in order to accommodate the new Biloxi license.

Even though almost all media markets were assigned two commercial VHF channels plus one non-commercial channel, the Biloxi market was sandwiched between New Orleans (channels 4, 6, 8, and 12) to the west, Hattiesburg–Laurel (channel 9, later 7) to the north, and Mobile–Pensacola (channels 3, 5, and 10) to the east. Channels 2 and 11 were also assigned in fairly close proximity in Baton Rouge and Meridian, respectively. This created a large "doughnut" on the Mississippi Gulf Coast where there could be only one VHF license. WLOX was fortunate enough to gain that license, and consequently became the only television station to be based in Biloxi until Mississippi ETV outlet WMAH-TV began broadcasting in 1972, and the market's only commercial station until WXXV-TV signed on in 1987.

In addition to bringing television to South Mississippi, WLOX also brought ABC programming to the western portion of the Mobile–Pensacola market. That market's ABC affiliate, WEAR-TV in Pensacola, did not cover areas west of Mobile very well until cable arrived in the region in the 1970s, with WLOX's equidistant distance from Mobile halving the market and drawing news viewership its way, to the detriment of WEAR-TV, an issue that persists to the present day. WLOX also filled a void in New Orleans; it provides at least grade B coverage to most of that market. New Orleans' ABC affiliate at the time, WVUE (now a Fox affiliate and sister station), preempted moderate amounts of ABC programming until 1978, including most of ABC's daytime soap operas, and was long one of the network's weakest-performing affiliates due to WWL-TV's dominance.

For most of the analog era, WLOX was the only "Big Three" station in the region. However, cable systems in Biloxi and Gulfport have long supplemented the area with stations from New Orleans and Mobile–Pensacola. On the other hand, this outlet was the default ABC affiliate for the Hattiesburg–Laurel market which did not have its own ABC station until June 11, 2012, when sister station WDAM added ABC programming to its second subchannel, replacing This TV. From May 18, 1979, until July 3, 2003, the station employed the use of the "-TV" suffix in its call sign.

In 1993, along with all other ABC affiliates in Mississippi, WLOX refused to air NYPD Blue due to decency concerns. However, unlike the other stations, the station never aired the show during its entire twelve-year run, opting to air syndicated reruns of Home Improvement and other sitcoms instead in the time slot. Rival WXXV, by then a Fox affiliate, picked up the show in 1994. The station also refused to air episodes of Ellen dealing with the character's sexuality. Nor did it (like many other affiliates) air ABC's Veterans Day 2004 showing of Saving Private Ryan, due to the Super Bowl XXXVIII halftime show controversy leaving it in limbo that a fine would be issued for the film's broadcast.

The Love family sold WLOX to the Liberty Corporation in March 1995. Originally part of its Cosmos Broadcasting division, it came directly under the Liberty banner following the company's exit from the insurance business in 2000. Liberty would eventually merge with Raycom Media in 2006. Under Raycom ownership and stricter ABC affiliate agreements, the station stopped removing network programming from its schedule due to content concerns.

WLOX's original TV studios on the ground floor of the beachfront Buena Vista Hotel were completely ruined in 1969 by the storm surge of Hurricane Camille, which was 8 feet (2.4 m) higher than any previous known storm. The Weather Channel series Storm Stories featured this during an August 2009 episode.

In 2005, WLOX remained on the air during Hurricane Katrina, even though its studios were heavily damaged in the storm. During the event, the station continued to broadcast non-stop for more than twelve days afterward. WLOX created an award-winning two-disc DVD set about the storm entitled Katrina: South Mississippi's Story. Footage of its building being damaged and the move to a temporary studio were part of Storm Stories on June 5, 2010. Anchor Rebecca Power's survival after returning home from the station was the main focus of the show. The station received a Peabody Award in 2005 "for the courageous efforts of all these staff members." In 2006, WLOX received the Edward R. Murrow National Award in the category of continuing coverage for its around-the-clock broadcasting of Hurricane Katrina and the storm's aftermath. WLOX also received a Southern Regional Emmy Humanitarian award in June 2006. It was added to DirecTV and Dish Network systems in the Biloxi–Gulfport market on June 16, 2010.

In March 2012 during the station's 50th anniversary celebration, WLOX began airing a vague promotional advertisement alluding to having an "eye" on the future with the CBS "eyemark" logo in the background of the spot. The station's front website banner also incorporated a "CBS—coming soon" link to the advertisement on YouTube suggesting a future digital subchannel with a schedule from the network for the market would be offered through WLOX. The station formally announced the CBS affiliation on March 28, 2012, with carriage on WLOX-DT2 replacing a 24-hour local weather channel. It was also made public that CableOne (now Sparklight) would carry WLOX's CBS channel in addition to its existing carriage of New Orleans' WWL-TV and Mobile's WKRG-TV, which have been on CableOne and its predecessors for decades.

During instances of severe weather, updates will broadcast on all WLOX digital services when warnings are issued by the National Weather Service. The addition of CBS to WLOX-DT2 is similar to a launch made by sister station WALB in Albany, Georgia. In that outlet's case, however, it added ABC to its second digital subchannel to complement its primary NBC service. WLOX-DT2 went live with CBS programming on April 8 starting with coverage of the 2012 Masters Tournament. In late 2017, the CBS subchannel was upgraded to high definition, albeit in 720p rather than the network's recommended 1080i format to preserve bandwidth. A direct-to-cable full 1080i high definition feed of WLOX-DT2 is available on select cable providers.

In April and May 2020 during the COVID-19 pandemic, WLOX would air a variety of school classroom lessons produced by the Gulfport School District from 9 to 11 a.m. weekdays on WLOX-DT3, preempting Bounce TV programming.

=== Sale to Gray Television ===
On June 25, 2018, Atlanta-based Gray Television announced it had reached an agreement with Raycom to merge their respective broadcasting assets (consisting of Raycom's 63 existing owned-and/or-operated television stations, including WLOX, and Gray's 93 television stations) under the former's corporate umbrella. The cash-and-stock merger transaction valued at $3.6 billion – in which Gray shareholders would acquire preferred stock currently held by Raycom – resulted in WLOX becoming a sister station to fellow ABC affiliate WTOK-TV in Meridian, in addition to its current Raycom sisters. The combined company will be in every Mississippi market except for Greenville and Columbus-Tupelo as a result. The sale was approved on December 20 and completed on January 2, 2019.

On December 30, 2023, WLOX parent company Gray Television announced it had reached an agreement with the New Orleans Pelicans to air 10 games on the station during the 2023–24 season.

On September 17, 2024, Gray and the Pelicans announced a broader deal to form the Gulf Coast Sports & Entertainment Network, which will broadcast nearly all 2024–25 Pelicans games on Gray's stations in the Gulf South, including on WLOX-DT5.

== Newscasts ==
Among former WLOX employees is Chuck Scarborough who was the main co-anchor for WNBC in New York City and ABC's Good Morning America anchor Robin Roberts. Both are Mississippi Gulf Coast natives. Roberts' sister, Sally-Ann, remains close to the area working at WWL-TV in New Orleans. WLOX upgraded its local newscasts to high definition level on May 25, 2011, complete with a new set and updated corporate graphics from Raycom. With the launch of CBS on WLOX-DT2, simulcasts of some local newscasts from the main channel are included in its schedule.

More specifically, WLOX's thirty-minute weekday afternoon show at 4, weeknight broadcast at 6, and weekend morning news are not seen on that second subchannel. The weekday morning program, Good Morning Mississippi, is only seen from 5 until 6:30 on the CBS channel. There is also a new program aired weeknights at 6:30 seen exclusively on WLOX-DT2. WLOX operates its own weather radar at its facility that is known on-air as "Mississippi Power Doppler". In addition to its main studios, the station operates a Jackson County Bureau in Pascagoula. WLOX shares resources (such as video footage) with sister station and NBC affiliate WDAM-TV in Laurel.

=== Notable former on-air staff ===
- Mark Mullen – anchor/reporter (1985–1987)
- Robin Roberts (1984–1986)
- Chuck Scarborough

== Subchannels ==
The station's signal is multiplexed:

Subchannels of WLOX
Channel	Res.	Short name	Programming
13.1	720p	WLOX-DT	ABC
13.2	720p	CBS	CBS
13.3	480i	Bounce	Bounce TV
13.4	480i	TruCrim	True Crime Network
13.5	480i	ION	Ion
13.6	480i	GCSEN	Gulf Coast Sports & Entertainment Network
13.7	480i	THE365	365BLK
