= WXVO-LD =

Television station in Biloxi, Mississippi

- Biloxi–Gulfport, Mississippi; United States
- City: Biloxi, Mississippi (Note: Originally licensed to Pascagoula, Mississippi; moved to Biloxi in 2026.) (applied to move to New Augusta, Mississippi)
- Channels: Digital: 19 (UHF), applied for 36 (UHF); Virtual: 11
- Branding: Ocean 11 TV

Programming
- Affiliations: 11.1: Antenna TV; for others, see § Subchannels

Ownership
- Owner: Edward Saint Pé; (WeatherVision 7, LLC)

History
- Founded: 2002
- Former call signs: W07DG (2002); WKFK-LP (2002–2009); WKFK-LD (2009–2016)
- Former channel numbers: Digital: 13 (VHF, 2008–2026); Virtual: 7 (until 2026)
- Former affiliations: The Sportsman Channel; America One; AMGTV; My Family TV; Grit; Court TV

Technical information
- Licensing authority: FCC
- Facility ID: 125534
- Class: LD
- ERP: 15 kW
- HAAT: 149.8 m (491 ft); 102.4 m (336 ft) (application)
- Transmitter coordinates: 30°29′9.9″N 88°42′53.2″W; 30°28′51″N 88°56′8″W (application)

Links
- Public license information: LMS
- Website: www.ocean11tv.com

WXVO-LD (channel 11) is a low-power television station licensed to Biloxi, Mississippi, United States, serving the Mississippi Gulf Coast as an affiliate of Antenna TV. Owned by meteorologist Edward Saint Pé, it is the flagship station for Saint Pé's weather forecast service WeatherVision.

In July 2008, the then-WKFK-LP in Pascagoula turned off its analog transmission and went to digital broadcasting over the air.

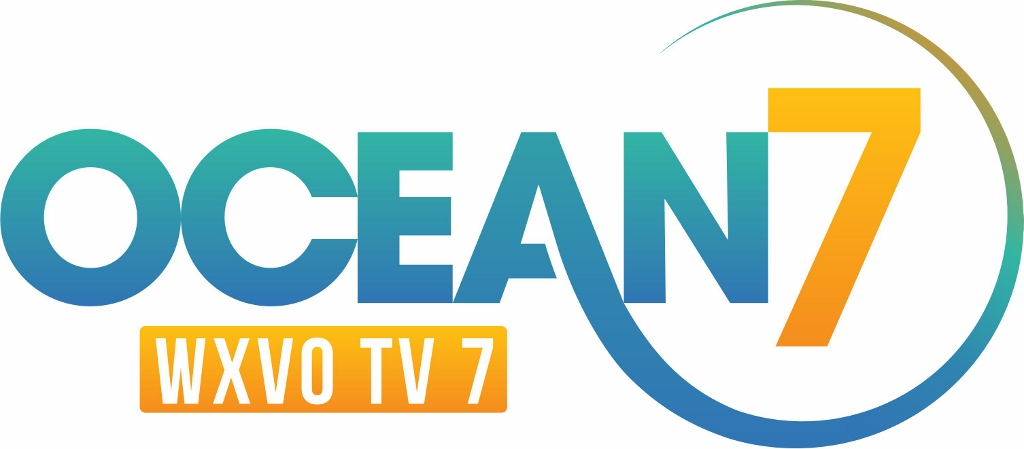
Logo from 2016 to 2026.

WKFK-LD moved to channel 13 from channel 7 after WDAM-TV's move to digital channel 7.

On January 21, 2026, WXVO-LD moved from VHF channel 13 to UHF channel 19, while changing its virtual channel from 7 to 11.

== Subchannels ==
The station's signal is multiplexed:

Subchannels of WXVO-LD
Channel	Res.	Short name	Programming
11.1	1080i	WXVO-HD	Antenna TV
11.2	480i	WXVO-LD	Religious Independent
11.3	480i	WXVO-TV	SonLife
11.4	480i	WXVO-4	Laff
11.5	480i	WXVO-5	Newsmax2
11.6	480i	WXVO-6	Ion Mystery
