= WHPM-LD =

Television station in Hattiesburg, Mississippi

- Hattiesburg–Laurel, Mississippi; United States
- City: Hattiesburg, Mississippi
- Channels: Digital: 23 (UHF); Virtual: 23
- Branding: Fox Pine Belt

Programming
- Subchannels: 23.1: Fox; 23.2: Antenna TV; 23.3: MeTV

Ownership
- Owner: Gray Media; (WHPM-TV, LLC)
- Sister stations: WDAM-TV, WLHA-LD

History
- First air date: June 15, 2005
- Former call signs: W30CB (2002–2005); WHPM-LP (2005–2011)
- Former channel numbers: Analog: 30 (UHF, 2005–2009)
- Former affiliations: Lifesat TV (2005–2011); The CW (23.2, 2012–2014)

Technical information
- Licensing authority: FCC
- Facility ID: 127263
- Class: LD
- ERP: 10.4 kW
- HAAT: 137 m (449 ft)
- Transmitter coordinates: 31°18′26.20″N 89°24′47.40″W

Links
- Public license information: LMS
- Website: www.myfox23.com

WHPM-LD (channel 23) is a low-power television station in Hattiesburg, Mississippi, United States, affiliated with the Fox network. It is owned and operated by Gray Media alongside NBC/ABC affiliate WDAM-TV (channel 7) and low-power Telemundo affiliate WLHA-LD (channel 18). The three stations share studios on US 11 in unincorporated Moselle in southern Jones County; WHPM-LD's transmitter is located on Old Highway 11/Norton Road in unincorporated Lamar County south of US 98.

== History ==
Former Pine Belt CW branding for 23.2

The station signed on June 15, 2005, as WHPM-LP carrying religious programming on analog UHF channel 30. It shut-down that signal and switched to digital channel 23 in 2009. However, the station would not switch its call sign to reflect the change until October 7, 2011, when it adopted WHPM-LD. It became the market's first locally based Fox affiliate on October 13, 2011. Until this point, the network was available off-air and on cable through WXXV-TV in Gulfport. That outlet strategically located its broadcast tower and designed a directional antenna pattern to enable the station to cover the Gulf Coast and Pine Belt regions of the state.

On September 10, 2012, WHPM took over promotional and advertising responsibilities of the area's cable-only CW affiliate "WBH". As a result, the service was added to a new second digital subchannel of WHPM in order to offer over-the-air viewers access to The CW. Except for local commercials, all programming was provided through the national CW Plus service. Initially, the station (now using the WHPM-LD2 call sign) remained on Comcast channel 59. Eventually, it began airing in 720p high definition over-the-air and on Comcast digital channel 438. As part of a long-term affiliation renewal with Media General, The CW moved to WHLT's digital subchannel on December 23, 2014. In July 2015, MeTV and MyNetworkTV were added to a third subchannel. This TV was added to the second subchannel in September, returning the network to the market after WDAM-DT2 switched to ABC three years prior. WHPM-LD2 switched to Antenna TV in 2021.

On June 25, 2026, it was announced that the licensee would sell WHPM to Gray Media for $4 million. Gray Media began operating the station on August 31, 2026.

== Programming ==
In addition to Fox programming, WHPM-LD operates the Hattiesburg–Laurel market's MyNetworkTV/MeTV affiliate on its LD3 subchannel, filling in programming for all time slots outside of the MyNetworkTV programming schedule with the MeTV schedule.

=== Newscasts ===
On September 25, 2015, Waypoint Media announced that it would launch a half-hour prime time newscast at 9:00 p.m. for WHPM-LD—the first such program in the Hattiesburg–Laurel market—on October 5. Although WHPM's operations were largely based out of the studios of then-sister stations WMDN and WGBC in Meridian (the latter of which debuted a prime time newscast on that same date), it is not clear if the program would be produced out of Hattiesburg or through WGBC/WMDN's Meridian facilities.

In October 2016, WHPM announced on its Facebook page that veteran broadcaster Randy Swan (formerly of nearby WDAM-TV) would join Waypoint Media as regional news director.

In June 2019, Waypoint Media purchased Media Gateway's centralized news operation, renaming it as News Hub; WHPM-LD adopted this news format. Waypoint sold the hub to Coastal Television Broadcast Group in July 2021; after the sale, WHPM-LD retained its affiliation with News Hub.

On August 31, 2026, WHPM-LD ended its affiliation with News Hub as Gray Media assumed operations, with newscasts being produced by WDAM-TV.

== Subchannels ==
The station's signal is multiplexed:

Subchannels of WHPM-LD
Subchannel	Res.	Short name	Programming
23.1	720p	FOXHD	Fox
23.2	480i	THPM	Antenna TV
23.3	480i	Metv	MyNetworkTV & MeTV
