= Elliot Burch =

American politician

Member of the Mississippi House of Representatives from the 105th district
- Incumbent
- Assumed office January 2, 2024
- Preceded by: Dale Goodin

Personal details
- Born: February 2, 1985 (age 41) Hattiesburg, Mississippi
- Party: Republican
- Education: Jones County Junior College (AA), William Carey University (BS); Mississippi College School of Law (JD)
- Occupation: Politician
- Profession: Attorney

Elliot Burch serves as a member of the Mississippi House of Representatives for the 105th District, affiliating with the Republican Party, a position he has held since 2024.
