= Roun McNeal =

American politician

Member of the Mississippi House of Representatives from the 105th district
- In office January 5, 2016 – January 7, 2020
- Preceded by: Dennis DeBar
- Succeeded by: Dale Goodin

Personal details
- Born: September 4, 1984 (age 41) Hattiesburg, Mississippi, U.S.
- Party: Republican

'Rounsaville S. McNeal', also known as Roun McNeal, (born September 4, 1984) is an American politician who served as a member of the Mississippi House of Representatives for the 105th district from 2016 to 2020.

== Background ==
McNeal was born in Hattiesburg, Mississippi in 1984. He attended Greene County High School in Leakesville, Mississippi.

He attended the University of Mississippi where he received a B.A. in political science. There, he was student body president and a member of St. Anthony Hall. He received a J.D. in law from the University of Mississippi School of Law.

== Career ==
McNeal was an attorney in private practice in Leakesville as Rounsaville Mc Neal PLLC. He currently teaches law at the University of Mississippi.

== Politics ==
In 2011, he was an unsuccessful Republican candidate for the Mississippi Senate.

He was elected to the Mississippi House of Representatives in 2015, representing District 105. He served as Vice-Chairman of the House County Affairs Committee. He also served on the following committees: Compilation, Revision and Publication; House Corrections; House Forestry; Judiciary En Banc; Judiciary B; Municipalities; Workforce Development; and House Universities and Colleges.

McNeal voted "the conservative line on everything from alternative forms of execution to vaccination exemption expansion." The American Conservative Union and The Business and Industry Political Education Committee have both given him high marks.

He ran for re-election in 2019, but lost the primary runoff. He served from January 5, 2016 to January 7, 2020.

== Personal ==
He is from Leakesville, Mississippi. He is a member of Faith Presbyterian Church and the Kairos Prison Ministries. He currently resides in Oxford, Mississippi.
