= Bally Sports New Orleans =

American regional sports network

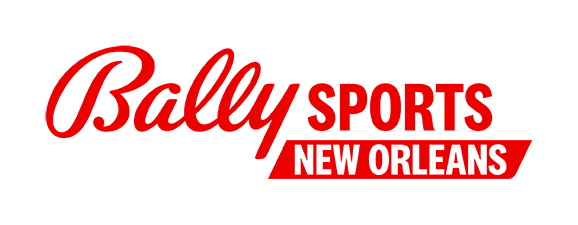
- Country: United States
- Broadcast area: Louisiana; Mississippi; East Texas; South Alabama; Florida Panhandle; Nationwide (via satellite)
- Network: Bally Sports
- Headquarters: New Orleans, Louisiana, U.S.

Programming
- Language: English
- Picture format: 720p (HDTV); 480i (SDTV)

Ownership
- Owner: Diamond Sports Group (Sinclair Broadcast Group and Entertainment Studios)
- Sister channels: Bally Sports Southwest

History
- Launched: October 31, 2012
- Closed: October 21, 2024
- Replaced by: Gulf Coast Sports & Entertainment Network
- Former names: Fox Sports New Orleans (2012-2021)

Links
- Website: www.ballysports.com/southwest/

Bally Sports New Orleans was an American regional sports network owned by Diamond Sports Group (a joint-venture between Sinclair Broadcast Group and Entertainment Studios), and operated as an affiliate of Bally Sports before it got renamed into the FanDuel Sports Network on October 21, 2024. Before the channel shut down, the channel broadcast local coverage of professional and collegiate sports events within New Orleans and the state of Louisiana. It also carried selected sports programming from sister channel Bally Sports Southwest, particularly the Texas Rangers and Dallas Stars.

Bally Sports New Orleans was available on cable providers throughout Louisiana, East Texas, South Alabama, the Florida Panhandle, and most parts of southern Mississippi (including Cox Communications, AT&T U-verse, Charter Spectrum, Suddenlink Communications and Comcast), with an estimated regional reach of 2.5 million households with a paid television subscription; it was also available on satellite via DirecTV until services for the New Orleans channel shut down in 2024.

The network quietly closed down on October 21, 2024, after the channel lost its professional sports programming to other outlets.

== History ==
The formation of Fox Sports New Orleans was announced on June 25, 2012, after Fox Sports Networks signed a new long-term agreement with the New Orleans Hornets (now the New Orleans Pelicans) to broadcast the NBA team's games. Fox acquired the regional cable television rights to the Hornets after Cox Sports Television declined to renew its contract with the team. The channel launched on October 31, 2012, at the start of the New Orleans Hornets regular season that year; Fox Sports New Orleans broadcast 75 Hornets games during the first year of the team's agreement with the channel.

On May 3, 2019, Sinclair Broadcast Group and Allen Media Group (via Diamond Sports Group) acquired the Fox Sports Networks from Disney for $10.6 billion, as part of a divestment mandated during Disney's acquisition of 21st Century Fox. On March 31, 2021, the channel was rebranded as Bally Sports as part of a sponsorship of the channels by casino operator Bally's Corporation.

=== Bankruptcy and closedown ===
In March 2023, Diamond Sports Group filed for chapter 11 bankruptcy. In 2024, the company declined to renew its broadcasting contracts with the New Orleans Pelicans, Dallas Stars, and Texas Rangers. The Pelicans in particular partnered with Gray Media and its subsidiary Raycom Sports to carry their games on a network of broadcast television stations led by WVUE-DT in New Orleans, as well as a subscription streaming service.

With the loss of its professional sports programming, Bally Sports New Orleans quietly closed on October 21, 2024.

== Programming ==
In addition to carrying the Pelicans' exhibition, regular season and early-round conference playoff games, Bally Sports New Orleans also aired Major League Baseball games featuring the Texas Rangers and select broadcasts of the NHL's Dallas Stars televised by sister channel Bally Sports Southwest. The network also formerly carried collegiate sporting events from the Atlantic Coast Conference, Big 12 Conference, and Southeastern Conference.

From its foundation, it was reported that the channel would negotiate for the television rights to the New Orleans Saints' team-related programs and events involving the LSU Tigers. While they were successful in acquiring some LSU Tigers sports programming such as Tigers football, basketball, and volleyball, attempts to acquire Saints-related programming were unsuccessful.

On June 16, 2018, FSNO carried a group-stage game in the FIFA World Cup from Fox between the Argentina and Iceland teams; WVUE-DT opted out of carrying the game due to issues with fulfilling their weekly E/I educational programming requirements with the numerous World Cup matches airing that week through Fox.

== Notable on-air staff ==
=== New Orleans Hornets/Pelicans ===
- Paul Crane – Pelicans host
- Jen Hale – Pelicans sideline reporter
- Joel Meyers – Pelicans play-by-play announcer
- Antonio Daniels – Pelicans color commentator
