= Dale Goodin =

American politician (born 1958)

Member of the Mississippi House of Representatives from the 105th district
- In office January 7, 2020 – January 2, 2024
- Preceded by: Roun McNeal
- Succeeded by: Elliot Burch

Personal details
- Born: October 13, 1958 (age 67) New Orleans, Louisiana, U.S.
- Party: Republican
- Education: Mercer County Community College (AAS); Western Illinois University (BA); University of Southern Mississippi (MS)

Military service
- Branch/service: United States Navy; United States Army
- Unit: United States Army Reserve; Mississippi Army National Guard

Dale Goodin (born October 13, 1958) is an American politician formerly serving as a member of the Mississippi House of Representatives from the 105th district. Elected in November 2019, he assumed office on January 7, 2020, and served until January 2, 2024.

== Early life and education ==
Goodin was born in New Orleans and attended New Augusta High School in New Augusta, Mississippi. He earned an Associate of Applied Science in business administration from Mercer County Community College, a Bachelor of Arts from Western Illinois University, and a Master of Science in educational leadership from the University of Southern Mississippi.

== Career ==
Goodin served in the United States Navy for 40 years. After retiring from active duty, he served in the United States Army Reserve and Mississippi Army National Guard. Goodin later worked as an administrator in the Perry County School District and was director of the Perry County Vocational Technical Center. He was elected to the Mississippi House of Representatives in November 2019 and assumed office on January 7, 2020.
