= American Fidelity Assurance =

American private, family-owned life and health insurance company

American Fidelity Assurance Company
- Company type: Private
- Industry: Supplemental benefits
- Founded: January 1, 1960
- Founders: C.W. and C.B. Cameron
- Headquarters: Oklahoma City, Oklahoma, United States
- Key people: Bill Cameron (Chairman and CEO)
- Number of employees: 2000
- Website: www.americanfidelity.com

American Fidelity Assurance (AFA) is an American private, family-owned life and health insurance company co-founded by C.W. and C.B. Cameron. It provides voluntary supplemental health insurance products (cancer, disability, life, and hospital indemnity) and tax-deferred annuities to education employees, auto dealerships, health care providers, and municipal workers across the United States. Headquartered in Oklahoma City, OK, AFA is a subsidiary of American Fidelity Corporation, which the founding Cameron family owns.

The company has ranked on Fortune magazine's "100 Best Companies to Work For" list 15 times, most recently in 2021.

American Fidelity serves 1 million customers in 49 states. Since 1982, AFA has consistently been rated "A+" by A. M. Best. AFA has 2000 employees around the U.S. and the Chairman and CEO is Bill Cameron, the grandson of company co-founder C.W. Cameron.

Headquarters: American Fidelity Assurance Company corporate headquarters is in the American Fidelity building (formerly the Oklahoma Publishing Company (OPUBCO), The Oklahoman newspaper building) located in north Oklahoma City just East off the Broadway Extension and Britton Road at 9000 Cameron Parkway.
