= Tommy Dickerson =

American politician (born 1945)

Member of the Mississippi Senate from the 43rd district
- In office 2008–2012
- Preceded by: James "Shannon" Walley
- Succeeded by: Phillip A. Gandy
- In office 1993–2004
- Preceded by: Cecil Mills
- Succeeded by: James "Shannon" Walley

Personal details
- Born: George Thomas Dickerson; November 2, 1945 (age 80) Pascagoula, Mississippi, U.S.
- Party: Democratic
- Other political affiliations: Republican (2003–2007)
- Spouse: Marie
- Education: University of Southern Mississippi (BS); Mississippi College (JD)
- Occupation: Lawyer; politician

George Thomas Dickerson (born November 2, 1945) is a former Democratic member of the Mississippi Senate, representing the 43rd District since 2008, and previously from 1993 through 2003.
