= WJTV =

Television station in Jackson, Mississippi

- Jackson, Mississippi; United States
- Channels: Digital: 12 (VHF); Virtual: 12
- Branding: WJTV 12, Mississippi's CW; 12 News; WJTV 2 (12.2)

Programming
- Affiliations: 12.1: The CW; 12.2: Independent; for others, see § Subchannels

Ownership
- Owner: Nexstar Media Group; (Nexstar Media Inc.)

History
- First air date: January 20, 1953
- Former call signs: WSLI-TV (on channel 12, 1954–1955)
- Former channel numbers: Analog: 25 (UHF, 1953–1955), 12 (VHF, 1955–2009); Digital: 52 (UHF, 1999–2009)
- Former affiliations: DuMont (secondary, 1953–1956); ABC (secondary 1953–1970, primary 1954–1955 on WSLI-TV); CBS (1953–2026)
- Call sign meaning: "Jackson Television"

Technical information
- Licensing authority: FCC
- Facility ID: 48667
- ERP: 49.2 kW
- HAAT: 491 m (1,611 ft)
- Transmitter coordinates: 32°14′26″N 90°24′15″W

Links
- Public license information: Public file; LMS
- Website: www.wjtv.com

WJTV (channel 12) is a television station in Jackson, Mississippi, United States, airing programming from The CW. Owned by Nexstar Media Group, the station has studios on TV Road in southwest Jackson, and its transmitter is located in Raymond, Mississippi. WHLT (channel 22) in Hattiesburg is a semi-satellite, airing WJTV newscasts as well as CW and CBS network programming in the Pine Belt.

WJTV was the first television station in Mississippi. Founded by Jackson's two daily newspapers, The Clarion-Ledger and the Jackson Daily News, it began broadcasting on UHF channel 25 on January 20, 1953, in time to present the inauguration of Dwight D. Eisenhower, and was affiliated with CBS. The Standard Life Insurance Corporation, owner of Jackson radio station WSLI, received a permit for channel 12 in 1954 and began television broadcasts as WSLI-TV, an ABC affiliate, from a site next door. In 1955, the two stations merged as WJTV on channel 12, with the newspapers purchasing an ownership interest in the venture, known as Capitol Broadcasting Company. WJTV continued to air ABC programs until WAPT (channel 16) began broadcasting in 1970.

The Hederman family sold the Jackson newspapers in 1982; WJTV was sold the next year to the News-Press & Gazette Company (NPG). NPG hired several former employees of the city's leading news station, WLBT (channel 3), and expanded the news department, but WJTV was unable to regularly overtake WLBT in the ratings. Under NPG, plans for a Pine Belt satellite eventuated as WHLT in 1987. The station was sold three times in four years, ending in Raycom Media trading WJTV and WHLT to Media General in 1997. The CW affiliation for Jackson moved to a digital subchannel in 2013. Nexstar acquired WJTV in 2017 and disaffiliated the station from CBS on August 1, 2026, making it a primary CW affiliate.

== History ==
=== WJTV on channel 25 and WSLI-TV on channel 12: Early years ===
During a years-long freeze on television applications imposed by the Federal Communications Commission (FCC) to address a new allocation plan that included opening up the ultra high frequency (UHF) band, the Third Notice of Further Proposed Rule Making adopted in March 1951 included a proposed nationwide table wherein Jackson, Mississippi, would receive three commercial TV channels: two on the very high frequency (VHF) band—3 and 12—and channel 25 on the UHF band. Jackson's two daily newspapers, The Clarion-Ledger and the Jackson Daily News, had initially intended to seek their own channels. They combined applications in June 1951 as the Mississippi Publishers Corporation, at which time they had initially specified channel 3.

Between the proposed table and the Sixth Report and Order in April 1952 which finalized the table, however, the minimum co-channel mileage separations had changed, especially near the Gulf of Mexico; amidst concerns of tropospheric propagation, VHF stations of the same channel 150 miles (240 km) from the gulf—designated by the FCC as Zone III—now had to be spaced 220 miles (350 km) apart. This caused channel 3 in Jackson to be short-spaced to channel 3 in Pensacola, Florida, by 2 miles (3.2 km), requiring the deletion of one of the assignments. Pensacola, which had been proposed channels 3 and 10, had already lost channel 10 to Albany, Georgia, when those two assignments were short-spaced; rather than delete the other VHF assignment at Pensacola, the FCC deleted channel 3 in Jackson instead, replacing it with UHF channel 47. The Mississippi Publishers application was refiled for channel 25 once the freeze was lifted. This application was unopposed and granted by the FCC in September 1952.

WJTV signed with CBS for an affiliation in October, by which time the studios were under construction south of Van Winkle. Ahead of the launch, the station took delivery of an outside broadcasting van and used it to deliver demonstrations of television in Jackson and other Mississippi cities. Construction work continued into January 1953 as every effort was made to try and finish the station so that it could telecast the inauguration of new president Dwight D. Eisenhower on January 20; this included chartering a plane from Maine to fly a crucial part. It barely made it. The first broadcast of WJTV, Mississippi's first television station, was not a test pattern but the inauguration—unusual at a time when a station might be expected to radiate a test pattern for a week or more before its first program. In addition to CBS, WJTV had an affiliation with the DuMont Television Network.

Two groups applied for channel 12: the Standard Life Insurance Company, owner of radio station WSLI, and Lamar Life, owner of WJDX. When the FCC re-added channel 3 to Jackson in September 1952 upon approval of a petition by Lamar to re-classify Jackson to Zone II, which lowered the co-channel separation to 190 miles (310 km), Lamar changed its application to specify channel 3 that November, leaving Standard the only applicant for channel 12. Rebel Broadcasting Corporation of Mississippi (WRBC) was one of two parties that had filed for channel 47. Rebel changed its application to specify channel 12 but withdrew in July 1953, clearing the way for Standard Life to begin constructing WSLI-TV on a property adjacent to WJTV. The station began broadcasting on March 27, 1954, and was affiliated with ABC. Owens Alexander arrived from WABT in Birmingham, Alabama, to serve as channel 12's general manager. With WLBT (channel 3), Lamar Life's NBC affiliate that began in December 1953, Jackson now had three TV stations.

=== Merger as WJTV on channel 12 ===
WJTV on channel 25 and WSLI-TV on channel 12 operated independently for more than a year. On April 15, 1955, the two parties announced a merger agreement whereby Mississippi Publishers would acquire a 40% interest in the Standard Life Broadcasting Company and the two TV stations would combine as WJTV on channel 12, with both stations' staffs and network affiliations. The combination was effective June 1, creating one station with CBS, ABC, and DuMont affiliations. The WSLI-TV building was retained for use by the merged WJTV, whose previous quarters next door were used to relocate WSLI radio. The channel 25 permit was disposed as a condition of the merger; Standard Life acquired its equipment and facilities for a cost nearly equal to the interest it was selling. The merged firm was known as the Capitol Broadcasting Company. (Note: Not to be confused with the Capitol Broadcasting Company of Raleigh, North Carolina.) DuMont ceased its existence as a network later that year.

In 1957, the station began broadcasting with the full authorized power for channel 12—316,000 watts—and in 1962, the station began broadcasting from a 1,615-foot (492 m) tower at Raymond, Mississippi, among the tallest constructed to that time. ABC programs were split between WJTV and WLBT, the NBC affiliate, until 1970, when WAPT (channel 16) debuted to provide a primary ABC affiliate in the Jackson market.

During its early years, WJTV produced several local programs. For children, the station offered a program hosted by "Skipper Dick" Miller from 1958 through the mid-1960s; Miller remained with the station through 1992 as a news anchor. The Popeye Theater was another early local program.

=== News-Press and Gazette Company ownership ===
The Clarion-Ledger and Daily News were sold to Gannett in 1982, marking the end of newspaper ownership by their controlling owner—the Hederman family. That October, Capitol put its Jackson radio and TV stations and two other properties it owned—KNAZ-TV in Flagstaff, Arizona, and KKTV in Colorado Springs, Colorado—on the market. The News-Press & Gazette Company (NPG) of St. Joseph, Missouri, agreed to buy the station for $19 million in December 1982. Owens Alexander left his post as general manager in 1983 after nearly 30 years with the station. Two years later, NPG hired William Dilday—the first Black person to serve as general manager of a TV station in the United States—after WLBT fired him. In 1986, he was promoted to general manager of WJTV, and in 1989, he left the station after being promoted to the corporate office.

Under NPG, plans were unblocked to build a satellite station in Hattiesburg, which was on the outer fringe of WJTV's transmitter coverage. Capitol and Central Television of Meridian—the owner of that city's WHTV, the CBS affiliate there—had each proposed to build a TV station to serve as the Hattiesburg–Laurel area's CBS affiliate, but Capitol could not be awarded a construction permit as long as it also held newspaper interests. The sale of the Jackson newspapers allowed Capitol to win a permit for channel 18 at Laurel in 1982. Central also received its permit, for channel 22 at Hattiesburg, while challenging the Laurel permit; in 1984, it reached a deal to sell its permit to NPG in exchange for a consulting contract. Laurel's WDAM-TV protested, claiming the contract was an undue payment because FCC rules restricted the compensation that could be paid for a construction permit. In August 1986, the FCC allowed the sale but agreed with WDAM on the price. WHLT began broadcasting on January 12, 1987, and originated some local programming and news coverage.

=== Media General ownership ===
New Vision Television acquired all eight of NPG's stations for $110 million in 1993. The company of East Lansing, Michigan, and Atlanta was a newly formed entity. New Vision chairman and executive Jason Elkin considered WJTV the company's flagship station. Within 18 months, New Vision's investors were ready to sell and flipped the same portfolio to Ellis Communications for $220 million. Ellis was sold in 1996 and became part of Raycom Media. Raycom acquired Ellis on May 14, 1996, and Federal Broadcasting on May 30. Federal owned WDAM, a competitor to WHLT in the Hattiesburg–Laurel market, and had to divest one of the two stations. In January 1997, WJTV and WHLT, along with WSAV-TV in Savannah, Georgia, were traded to Media General for WTVR-TV in Richmond, Virginia, which it had just purchased but could not retain alongside the Richmond Times-Dispatch. During the various owners, 12 station positions were filled and $2 million was spent on capital expenditures. While WJTV increased its overall ratings, its newscasts continued to finish second to WLBT.

In October 2013, WJTV returned programming from The CW to the Jackson market after the previous affiliate, WRBJ-TV (channel 34), was sold to the Trinity Broadcasting Network. WJTV placed the network on its second digital subchannel.

=== Nexstar ownership ===
Media General initially agreed to merge with the Meredith Corporation but faced a shareholder revolt in the wake of an unsolicited offer from Nexstar Broadcasting Group, which agreed to acquire the company in January 2016. The sale was completed on January 17, 2017, at which time Nexstar changed its name to Nexstar Media Group.

WJTV lost its CBS affiliation to WAPT on August 1, 2026, as part of a modified renewal of most other Nexstar affiliations with CBS. At that time, it became a primary CW affiliate. Jackson was one of four markets where stations owned by Hearst Television assumed the CBS affiliation from Nexstar-owned stations in their markets. WJTV's semi-satellite station WHLT remained a CBS affiliate. WJTV's previous CW subchannel, "EJTV", was converted into an independent station focused on syndicated court shows and sitcoms.

== News operation ==
When WJTV began broadcasting, its news department consisted of two people, including Bob Neblett, a pilot who spent 20 years as the station's weatherman. Traditionally, WJTV was the second-rated news station in Jackson, behind WLBT and ahead of WAPT. Though WJTV was a VHF station like WLBT, that station's traditionally strong signal and, after the 1970s, identity in the Black community made it an entrenched leader. WJTV was a much stronger second than WAPT—for instance, in 1988, WLBT, WJTV, and WAPT attracted 39, 32, and 11 percent of the 10 p.m. news audience, respectively. In May 1990, WJTV beat WLBT in late news and delivered CBS its best prime time ratings in any of the top 100 media markets.

In 1984, former WLBT anchor Walter Saddler, who had been fired from that station after an ownership shake-up, was named managing editor at WJTV. He was later paired with Melanie Christopher, who became a WJTV mainstay and anchored at the station for 25 years. Under NPG, WJTV added newscasts, including a 5 p.m. report in 1988 and a 6 a.m. morning newscast launched in December 1992, displacing the talk show A Mississippi Morning to later in the day.

In the mid-1990s, WJTV fell out of contention for first place with WLBT. The newscasts were retooled with new presentation, including set parts from Ellis's WMC-TV in Memphis, and enhanced weather forecasting technology. The morning newscast was extended to a 5:30 a.m. start in 2000.

By 2011, WAPT was only three percentage points in audience share behind WJTV in the 10 p.m. news ratings, and WAPT had surpassed WJTV by 2013.

WHLT has had varying levels of local news coverage and at times relied entirely on WJTV for news production. In 1988, the station began producing a local 6 p.m. newscast from Hattiesburg and inserting local content into WJTV's 10 p.m. report. In 1991, a local 10 p.m. newscast from Hattiesburg debuted. However, the station's audience share of 7 percent was far surpassed by the 66 percent tuning to WDAM for news. In 1996, WHLT's separate newscasts were discontinued, and the station began airing an eight-minute 10 p.m. newscast as well as news and weather updates recorded in Jackson. Under Media General, WHLT again produced its own newscasts from 1999 to 2001. In 2007, it resumed producing news inserts into WJTV's newscasts. In 2017, simulcasts of WJTV's noon and 5 p.m. newscasts were added to the WHLT lineup.

=== Notable former on-air staff ===
- Matt Winer – sports anchor, 1993–1995

== Technical information ==
=== Subchannels ===
WJTV's transmitter is located near Raymond, Mississippi. The station's signal is multiplexed:

Subchannels of WJTV
Subchannel	Res.	Short name	Programming
12.1	1080i	WJTV-HD	The CW
12.2	720p	The CW	Independent
12.3	480i	ION TV	Ion
12.4	480i	CourtTV	Court TV

=== Analog-to-digital conversion ===
WJTV began broadcasting a digital signal on UHF channel 52 on April 19, 2002. It shut down its analog signal on June 12, 2009, as part of the digital television transition. WJTV's digital signal relocated to VHF channel 12 after the transition.
