= Phillip A. Gandy =

Former US politician

Member of the Mississippi State Senate from the 43rd district
- In office January 3, 2012 – January 6, 2016
- Preceded by: Tommy Dickerson
- Succeeded by: Dennis DeBar

Personal details
- Born: August 28, 1950 (age 75) Hickory, Mississippi, U.S.
- Party: Republican
- Children: 3

Phillip A. Gandy (born August 28, 1950) is an American Republican politician who represented the 43rd District in the Mississippi State Senate from 2012 to 2016.

== Biography ==
Phillip Austin Gandy was born on August 28, 1950, in Hickory, Mississippi. He was the son of farmer Sam Gandy and Vera Estelle (Purvis) Gandy, and had one brother and three sisters. Gandy graduated from Hickory High School. He then graduated from East Central Mississippi Community College and Southeastern Baptist College. Gandy worked as a pastor of the Liberty Baptist Church as of 2012.

=== Political career ===
Gandy ran to represent District 43, composed of Wayne, George, Greene, and Stone Counties, as a Republican in the Mississippi State Senate in August 2011 for the 2012–2016 term, succeeding Tommy Dickerson. Gandy won the Republican primary in August 2011 and defeated Democrat James Walley and Independent James Snyder in the general election on November 8, 2011. The term lasted from January 3, 2012, to January 6, 2016. During the term, Gandy chaired the Senate's Ethics Committee, and also served on the following committees: Agriculture; Appropriations; County Affairs; Drug Policy; Forestry; Veterans and Military Affairs; and Energy. He also introduced Senate Bill 2681, or "The Mississippi Religious Freedom Restoration Act of 2014", which passed and successfully added "In God We Trust" to the state seal of Mississippi.

Gandy ran for re-election, but lost the Republican primary to State Representative Dennis DeBar, with Gandy receiving 2,894 votes compared to DeBar's 3,554 votes.

== Personal life ==
Gandy is a Baptist and a member of the Rotary Club. He married Peggy McNeil in 1970 and they have two daughters and a son, and four grandchildren as of 2012.
