= Dennis DeBar =

American politician

Member of the Mississippi State Senate from the 43rd district
- Incumbent
- Assumed office January 5, 2016
- Preceded by: Phillip A. Gandy

Member of the Mississippi House of Representatives from the 105th district
- In office January 3, 2012 – January 5, 2016
- Preceded by: J. Shaun Walley
- Succeeded by: Roun McNeal

Personal details
- Born: October 25, 1971 (age 54) Leakesville, Mississippi
- Party: Republican
- Education: University of Central Florida (BS); Mississippi College (JD)

Military service
- Branch/service: United States Air Force

Dennis DeBar, Jr. (born October 25, 1971) is an American politician who has served in the Mississippi State Senate from the 43rd district since 2016. He previously served in the Mississippi House of Representatives from the 105th district from 2012 to 2016.
