= James Walley =

Mississippi state senator

Member of the Mississippi State Senate from the 43rd district
- In office January 6, 2004 – January 8, 2008
- Preceded by: Tommy Dickerson
- Succeeded by: Tommy Dickerson

Personal details
- Born: 1973 or 1974 (age 51–52)
- Party: Republican (from 2007); Democrat (until 2007)
- Education: Jones Community College; University of Southern Mississippi

James "Shannon" Walley is a former Republican member of the Mississippi Senate, representing the 43rd District from 2003 to 2007. He was originally elected as a Democrat before switching to the Republican Party in 2007, thereby placing the balance of power in the chamber at 26 Republicans to 26 Democrats.

Walley narrowly lost re-election in 2007 to Tommy Dickerson, the former incumbent for the seat that Walley had defeated; Dickerson himself had switched parties from Democrat to Republican as a state senator before switching back to Democrat when re-challenging Walley.

Walley attended Jones Community College and the University of Southern Mississippi. He is married.
