= Adventures of Superman =

Adventures of Superman or The Adventures of Superman may refer to:

- The Adventures of Superman (radio series), program of the 1940s
- The Adventures of Superman (novel), written in 1942 by George Lowther
- Adventures of Superman (TV series), a 1952–1958 TV series starring George Reeves
- The Adventures of Superman (comic book), published by DC Comics
- The New Adventures of Superman (TV series), an animated series that aired from 1966 to 1970

== See also ==
- Lois & Clark: The New Adventures of Superman, the 1990s TV series
- My Adventures with Superman
