= WTOK-TV =

Television station in Meridian, Mississippi

- Meridian, Mississippi; United States
- Channels: Digital: 13 (VHF); Virtual: 11
- Branding: Channel 11; WTOK News 11; myTOK2 (11.2); Meridian CW 8 (11.3)

Programming
- Affiliations: 11.1: ABC; 11.2: Independent with MyNetworkTV; 11.3: CW+; for others, see § WTOK-TV subchannels

Ownership
- Owner: Gray Media; (Gray Television Licensee, LLC)

History
- First air date: September 26, 1953
- Former channel numbers: Analog: 11 (VHF, 1953–2009); Digital: 49 (UHF, 2000–2009), 11 (VHF, 2009–2020)
- Former affiliations: CBS (1953–1980); DuMont (secondary, 1953–1955); NBC (secondary, 1953–1972); ABC (secondary, 1953–1980); Fox (secondary mid-1990s, 11.2 2006–2008)

Technical information
- Licensing authority: FCC
- Facility ID: 4686
- ERP: 115 kW
- HAAT: 160 m (525 ft)
- Transmitter coordinates: 32°19′39″N 88°41′28″W

Links
- Public license information: Public file; LMS
- Website: www.wtok.com

WTOK-TV (channel 11) is a television station in Meridian, Mississippi, United States, affiliated with ABC, MyNetworkTV and The CW Plus. The station is owned by Gray Media, and maintains studios on 23rd Avenue in Meridian's Mid-Town section; its transmitter is located on Crestview Circle (along MS 145/Roebuck Drive) in unincorporated Lauderdale County, south of the city.

== History ==
WTOK-TV began broadcasting on September 26, 1953, as the second television station in Mississippi and the first on the VHF band. WTOK was originally owned by Southern Television Corporation founded by Robert F. Wright, and its first program was a football game between Dartmouth and Holy Cross. WJTV in Jackson had started broadcasting in January of that year on a UHF frequency. WTOK started as a primary CBS affiliate but carried programming from ABC, NBC, and DuMont as well. DuMont folded in 1955 and NBC went to WHTV (channel 24, now WMDN) when that station resumed broadcasting in 1972 (via its status as a satellite of Tupelo's WTWV, now WTVA). It became an exclusive ABC affiliate on April 1, 1980, sending CBS to WHTV when WTVA's owners decided to convert it into a separate station. ABC had become the highest-rated network in the nation by this time and wanted a station that would clear all of its programming. Wright also owned The Meridian Star, and was forced to sell channel 11 to the Hobby family of Houston in 1981 as a result of FCC action six years earlier prohibiting cross-ownership between a town's only newspaper and TV station. In 1983, the Hobbys reorganized their broadcast holdings as H&C Communications after they sold off the Houston Post. H&C then sold WTOK to United Broadcasting, who also owned KARK-TV in Little Rock, Arkansas, in 1984.

Although most media markets were allocated two VHF commercial channels and one VHF noncommercial channel, what would become of the Meridian media market was sandwiched between Columbus–Tupelo (channels 2, 4, and 9) to the north, Jackson (channel 3 and later channel 12) to the west, Hattiesburg–Laurel (channel 9, later 7) and Mobile (channels 3, 5, and 10) to the south, and Birmingham (channels 6, 10, and 13) and Montgomery (channels 8 and 12) to the east. This created a "doughnut" in East Central Mississippi where there was only one VHF license available. WTOK-TV was fortunate enough to gain that license, and consequently became the only station to serve the Meridian area until WHTV started in 1968 (however, that station went off the air in 1970, for a year and a half); WMAW (a Mississippi Public Broadcasting station) would not sign on until 1972.

WTOK also served as a partial Fox affiliate in the mid-1990s, carrying NFL broadcasts as well as selected Fox programming in late night time-slots, after ABC programming had ended for the day. In 1988, then-owner United Broadcasting was taken over by investment firm Merrill Lynch, who then sold its three stations off to separate buyers. That year, Benedek Broadcasting bought WTOK. When Benedek's parent company went bankrupt in 2002, current owner Gray Television bought most of the Benedek portfolio, including WTOK.

WTOK-TV has been digital-only since June 12, 2009.

On June 25, 2018, Gray Television announced it would acquire Montgomery, Alabama–based Raycom Media for $3.65 billion. The deal would give WTOK-TV new sister stations in Raycom's virtual triopoly of NBC affiliate WLBT, Fox affiliate WDBD and MyNetworkTV affiliate WLOO in Jackson. In addition, the sale would give Gray ownership of at least one station in nearly every television market in Mississippi (the exceptions being Greenville and the adjacent Columbus-Tupelo market). The FCC approved the sale on December 20, and the sale was consummated on January 2.

On December 30, 2023, WTOK-TV parent company Gray Television announced it had reached an agreement with the New Orleans Pelicans to air 10 games on the station during the 2023–24 season.

On September 17, 2024, Gray and the Pelicans announced a broader deal to form the Gulf Coast Sports & Entertainment Network, which would broadcast nearly all 2024–25 Pelicans games on Gray's stations in the Gulf South, including WTOK-TV.

== WTOK-DT2 ==
WTOK-DT2, branded on air as "myTOK2", is the MyNetworkTV-affiliated second digital subchannel of WTOK-TV, broadcasting in 16:9 widescreen standard definition on channel 11.2.

=== History ===
The station signed on in early 2006 as the market's first locally based Fox affiliate. Known on-air as "Fox Meridian", it could also be seen on Comcast channel 10 and in high definition on digital channel 434. WTOK had previously served as a partial Fox affiliate in the mid-1990s, carrying NFL broadcasts as well as selected Fox programming in late-night time-slots. Access to the rest of the network's programs was provided on cable at first via WDBB in Tuscaloosa, Alabama, then via Foxnet after WDBB switched its affiliation to The WB in 1996.

Starting September 5, 2006, it began airing programming from Fox's new sister programming service MyNetworkTV. Shows from that service aired Monday through Friday nights from 9 until 11 in a delayed arrangement. After NBC affiliate WGBC (channel 30) acquired the area's Fox affiliation in late 2008, WTOK-DT2 became branded as "myTOK2" to reflect the station's shift to a primary MyNetworkTV affiliation. At this point, overnight programming from The Sportsman Channel was dropped and Jewelry Television took its place. It also moved from Comcast channel 10 to channel 2 and surrendered the digital channel 434 allotment to WGBC.

In October 2017, the over-the-air feed of "myTOK2" was upgraded into a 16:9 widescreen standard-definition picture format; it could not be upgraded into 720p HD, most likely due to bandwidth limitations prohibiting WTOK from transmitting all three of its feeds in HD simultaneously. "myTOK2" had previously been offered in 480i 4:3 standard definition. In autumn 2018, Gray Television opted out of an HD upgrade to its 11.2 subchannel, instead deciding to add Ion Television to channel 11.4.

== Newscasts ==
WTOK-TV has long been the dominant station in Eastern Mississippi due to its status as the only VHF station in the area. From 1991 to 1994, WTOK was even the only over-the-air commercial station in town after both of its rivals went off-the-air. After WMDN shut down its news department in 2005, WTOK would be the only source of full-length local newscasts in the market until 2012. Unlike most ABC affiliates, it does not air full two-hour morning or midday newscasts during the week. WTOK-DT2 rebroadcasts the 6 a.m. hour of Good Morning Meridian weekday mornings at 7:30 and NewsCenter 11 at 10 every night at midnight. On April 25, 2012, WTOK-TV began broadcasting local newscasts in high definition for the first time.

=== Awards ===
In 2016, WTOK-TV was recognized by the Associated Press for best breaking news coverage and best breaking weather coverage.

=== Notable former on-air staff ===
- Ashley ShahAhmadi – sports reporter
- Stan Torgerson – reporter

== Technical information ==
=== WTOK-TV subchannels ===
Subchannels of WTOK-TV
Subchannel	Res.	Short name	Programming
11.1	720p	WTOKABC	ABC
11.2	480i	MyTOK2	Independent with MyNetworkTV
11.3	720p	WTOKCW	The CW Plus
11.4	480i	WTOKION	Ion
11.5	480i	WTOKGCS	Gulf Coast SEN
11.6	480i	WTOKCOZ	Cozi TV
11.7	480i	WTOK365	365BLK

=== WOOK-LD subchannels ===
Subchannels of WOOK-LD
Subchannel	Res.	Short name	Programming
15.1	1080i	WOOKTEL	Telemundo
15.2	480i	WOOKHI	Heroes & Icons
15.3	480i	WOOKSTV	Start TV
15.4	480i	WOOKWX	Weather radar
15.5	720p	WOOKGCS	Gulf Coast SEN (WTOK-DT5) in HD
15.6	480i	WOOK365	365BLK (WTOK-DT7)

Simulcast of subchannels of another station

In 2021, Gray launched a low-power station, WOOK-LD on channel 15. The channel originally relayed WTOK's main channel on 15.3, its Circle TV feed on 15.2, a weather and traffic stream on 15.4, and was planning additional programming on channels 15.1 and 15.5. By March 2023, WOOK began carrying Heroes and Icons on channel 15.2 and Start TV on channel 15.3, removing the redundant coverage of Circle and WTOK. In April 2023, WOOK launched Telemundo on channel 15.1, initially removing channel 15.5 before adding a 720p HD simulcast of WTOK-DT5 (Gulf Coast SEN) to that subchannel, along with a simulcast of WTOK-DT7 (365BLK) to channel 15.6, while the weather and traffic stream remains on channel 15.4.

== See also ==
- Channel 8 branded TV stations in the United States
- Channel 11 digital TV stations in the United States
- Channel 11 virtual TV stations in the United States
