= WTBL-LD =

Television station in Pascagoula, Mississippi

- Biloxi–Gulfport, Mississippi; United States
- City: Pascagoula, Mississippi (nominal city of license)
- Channels: Digital: 31 (UHF); Virtual: 51
- Branding: MeTV Biloxi; Telemundo Biloxi (51.2)

Programming
- Affiliations: 51.1: MeTV; 51.2: Telemundo; for others, see § Subchannels

Ownership
- Owner: Gray Media; (Gray Television Licensee, LLC)
- Sister stations: WLOX

History
- First air date: 1990
- Former call signs: W46AV (1990–2000); W51CU (2000–2010); WGUD-LP (2010–2013); WGUD-LD (2013–2022)
- Former channel numbers: Analog: 46 (UHF, 1990–2000), 51 (UHF, 2000–2011), 38 (UHF, 2011–2013); Digital: 51 (UHF, 2013–2022)
- Former affiliations: TBN (1990–2010); FamilyNet (2010–2017)

Technical information
- Licensing authority: FCC
- Facility ID: 67989
- Class: LD
- ERP: 4 kW; 15 kW (CP)
- HAAT: 34.3 m (113 ft); 326.2 m (1,070 ft) (CP)
- Transmitter coordinates: 30°23′36.7″N 89°0′1.1″W; 30°43′23″N 89°5′28″W (CP)

Links
- Public license information: LMS
- Website: www.telemundobiloxi.com (51.2)

WTBL-LD (channel 51) is a low-power television station serving Biloxi and Gulfport, Mississippi, United States, as an affiliate of MeTV and Telemundo. It is nominally licensed to Pascagoula, Mississippi; however, it only provides a marginal signal to that area. WTBL-LD is owned by Gray Television alongside dual ABC/CBS affiliate WLOX (channel 13). The two stations share studios on DeBuys Road in Biloxi, where WTBL-LD's transmitter is also located.

== History ==
The original construction permit for the station was granted on October 29, 1987, for operation on channel 46; the station was assigned the call letters W46AV. Originally owned by Tel-Radio Communications Properties, the permit was transferred to the Trinity Broadcasting Network (TBN) in 1988. A license to cover was issued August 16, 1990. It moved to channel 51 in 2000 and became W51CU.

TBN sold W51CU to Tim Wall, owner of Scranton Broadcasting Company, LLC in 2010. Soon after the sale was approved (but while still under TBN ownership), the station changed its call letters to WGUD-LP. Scranton relaunched WGUD-LP on September 1, 2010, as a FamilyNet affiliate, with some local programming. On January 4, 2013, the station changed its call sign to WGUD-LD. In 2017, due to the eventual rebranding of FamilyNet, WGUD-LD changed affiliates again.

On October 3, 2022, the station changed its callsign from WGUD-LD to WTBL-LD.

== Subchannels ==
The station's signal is multiplexed:

Subchannels of WTBL-LD
| Channel | Display | Short name | Programming |
|---|---|---|---|
| 51.1 | 480i | WTBLLD1 | MeTV |
| 51.2 | 1080i | WTBLHD | Telemundo |
| 51.3 | 720p | GCSEN | Gulf Coast Sports & Entertainment Network |
| 51.4 | 480i | THE365 | 365BLK |

WTBL-LD currently has a construction permit to move its signal to digital channel 38. A previous such permit, granted in 2006, expired on June 19, 2009. Around 2011, WGUD-LP consummated its relocation, and began broadcasting three subchannels, with programming from FamilyNet, MeTV and Pursuit Channel. The Cowboy Channel replaced FamilyNet on July 1, 2017.

Beginning in October 2024, WTBL-LD's third subchannel has been affiliated with the Gray Television owned Gulf Coast Sports & Entertainment Network. The network is the television home of the New Orleans Pelicans of the National Basketball Association.
