= WAPT =

Television station in Jackson, Mississippi

- Jackson, Mississippi; United States
- Channels: Digital: 21 (UHF); Virtual: 16
- Branding: 16 WAPT; CBS Mississippi (16.4)

Programming
- Affiliations: 16.1: ABC; 16.4: CBS; for others, see § Subchannels

Ownership
- Owner: Hearst Television; (Jackson Hearst Television Inc.)

History
- First air date: October 3, 1970
- Former channel numbers: Analog: 16 (UHF, 1970–2009)
- Call sign meaning: "American Public Television"; station was founded by American Public Life Insurance Company

Technical information
- Licensing authority: FCC
- Facility ID: 49712
- ERP: 1,000 kW
- HAAT: 332 m (1,089 ft)
- Transmitter coordinates: 32°16′41″N 90°17′40″W

Links
- Public license information: Public file; LMS
- Website: www.wapt.com

WAPT (channel 16) is a television station in Jackson, Mississippi, United States, affiliated with ABC and CBS. The station is owned by Hearst Television and maintains studios and transmitter facilities on Channel 16 Way (off MS 18) in southwest Jackson.

WAPT was the third commercial station in Jackson. It signed on in October 1970 and was owned by Jackson-based insurer American Public Life Insurance Company. Under several owners, it had generally been the third-rated station for local news in the market, a historic position attributable to its late entrance and smaller coverage area in the 1970s and 1980s. Argyle Television acquired WAPT in 1995, then proceeded to merge with Hearst in 1997. The station has become more competitive in local news under Hearst ownership. Its fourth subchannel replaced WJTV as Jackson's CBS affiliate on August 1, 2026.

== History ==
=== Early years ===
In 1965, two groups sought Jackson's channel 16 allocation: John MacLendon, owner of Jackson radio station WOKJ and a station in Birmingham, Alabama, and an affiliate of American Public Life Insurance Company, a Jackson-based insurer. The Federal Communications Commission (FCC) designated the applications for consideration in the same comparative hearing case, and in October, the two merged their applications. At the time, it was stated that channel 16 would begin broadcasting in the fall of 1967. By March 1969, American Public Life had announced in its 1968 annual report to shareholders that construction activities were underway and the station, dubbed WAPT, was negotiating with ABC for affiliation. However, that November, MacLendon died of a heart attack in a Miami hospital; he had fallen ill on a business trip to Central America. American Public Life Insurance Company then acquired MacLendon's 50-percent share from his estate.

On September 1, 1970, the two commercial stations in Jackson, NBC affiliate WLBT and CBS affiliate WJTV, ceased airing ABC programming. However, WAPT was not ready to go on the air; a strike at the RCA factory in Camden, New Jersey, delayed the delivery of its antenna. WAPT began broadcasting on October 3, 1970; a football game between Ole Miss and Alabama was carried that day by WJTV and WAPT, as WJTV had been a backup plan if channel 16 could not start in time. Its arrival brought full three-network service to Jackson: Tom Dupree of The Clarion-Ledger hailed the station for "eliminating the biggest headache which has plagued Jackson since the first TV was plugged in".

American Public Life Insurance Company sold WAPT in 1976 to a consortium of six professional and business investors, known as Television America Sixteen, for $500,000 and the assumption of another $3 million in liabilities; at the same time, its board chairman sold his interest in WRBT-TV in Baton Rouge, Louisiana. Three years later, Clay Broadcasting of Charleston, West Virginia, acquired WAPT for $7.5 million from the group, promising improvements in the news department, which continued to badly lag even though ABC was the number-one network at the time. Clay sought to update WAPT's equipment and expand the staff of the station.

=== Price and Northstar Television Group ownership ===
Price Communications acquired Clay's four-station group in 1987 for $60 million after Clay began soliciting bids for the company's holdings; Price acquired the TV stations, while Thomson Newspapers acquired its print publications. Two years later, Price executive Dick Appleton led a management buyout of part of the company, paying $120 million for four Price stations, including WAPT; the new ownership was named Northstar Television Group. For a time in 1991, Appleton traveled to Jackson to run the station directly, relieving the general manager, who was recovering from brain surgery. He then fired the news director and told a newspaper reporter that WAPT was the "sick kid" in his station group.

WAPT was one of 57 stations that declined to carry NYPD Blue when it debuted in September 1993; the show's language, nudity, and violence led all five of the state's ABC affiliates to decline to air the program at the outset. The station reversed its stance in January 1995, with general manager Stuart Kellogg citing changes made by ABC.

=== Argyle/Hearst ownership ===
Argyle Television II acquired three of the four Northstar stations in a deal announced in September 1994 and consummated in January 1995. The company was made up of investors who had sold the original Argyle Television group to New World Communications. In August 1997, Argyle merged with the Hearst Corporation's broadcasting unit to form what was then known as Hearst-Argyle Television. The name continued until 2009, when the Hearst Corporation acquired Argyle's stake in the venture, took it private, and renamed it Hearst Television.

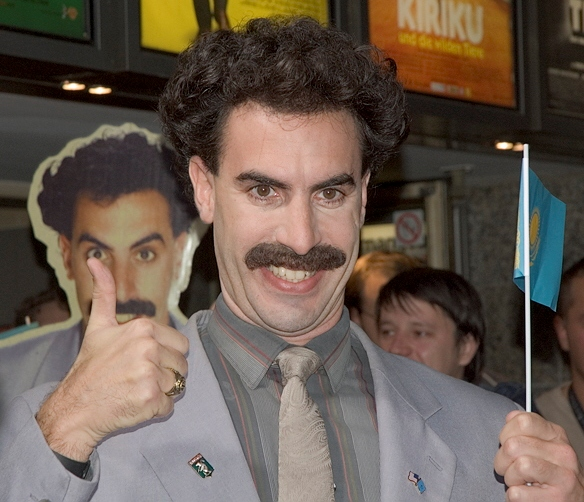
Sacha Baron Cohen as Borat

In 2005, Sacha Baron Cohen appeared as his Borat character in a news interview while secretly filming a segment for the movie of the same name. The station had been told by a publicist that the appearance was for a Bulgarian television documentary and was provided a fake website to that effect. After the film's release the next year, Dharma Arthur, a news producer for WAPT, wrote a letter to Newsweek saying that Borat's appearance on the station had led to her losing her job: "Because of him, my boss lost faith in my abilities and second-guessed everything I did thereafter...How upsetting that a man who leaves so much harm in his path is lauded as a comedic genius." Although Arthur had said she was fired from the station in the letter to Newsweek, she had previously told the Associated Press that she had resigned.

During Hurricane Katrina in 2005, 19 employees of WDSU, the Hearst-Argyle station in New Orleans, relocated to WAPT. A secondary set was built at WAPT to support temporary newscasts from Jackson, which were broadcast on radio and internet. WDSU anchors were later sent to WESH in Orlando; they did not return to New Orleans until October.

WAPT's fourth subchannel assumed the CBS affiliation for Jackson from WJTV on August 1, 2026. WAPT was one of four Hearst-owned stations receiving CBS from Nexstar Media Group–owned stations in their markets.

== News operation ==
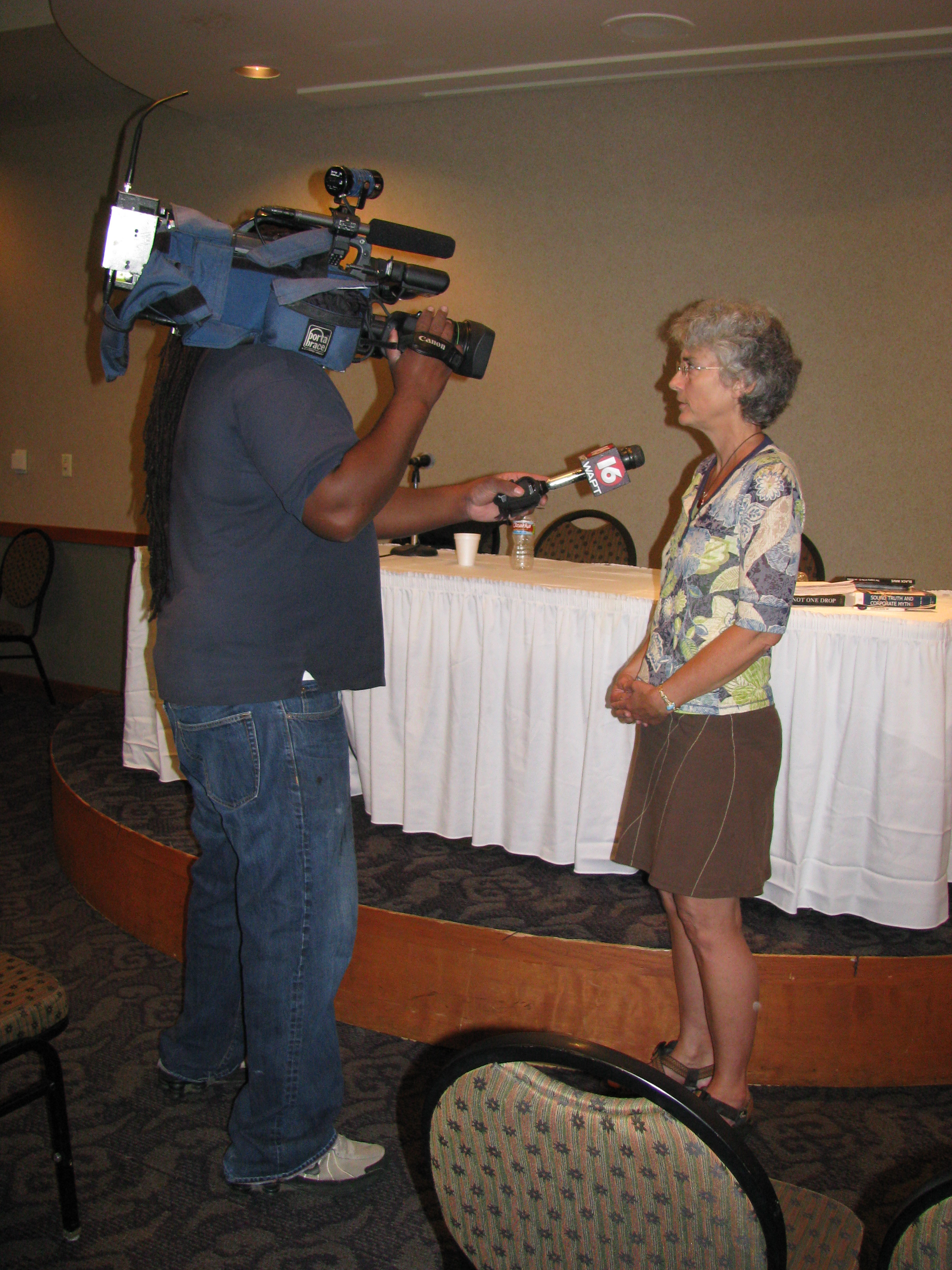
A WAPT crewman conducting an interview in 2011

WAPT began producing local news in early 1971. Bert Case was the first news director; he went on to a 40-year career at WLBT when he left in 1974. Dick Thames, the first sports anchor, died in a 1972 plane crash as he was preparing a news story; footage of the crash was filmed by a WAPT cameraman.

WAPT has traditionally been the third-rated station for local news in Jackson, behind WJTV and market leader WLBT. In part, this was because, historically, WLBT and WJTV, both on the very high frequency (VHF) band, had larger coverage areas; WAPT's signal reached about 69 percent of the area that WLBT's did. In addition, the station had fewer resources in every area. With just one sportscaster, anchors got burned out keeping up with central Mississippi sports, particularly when WLBT and WJTV both had larger teams; WAPT often cycled through sports anchors. At the end of 1988, the station ceased broadcasting weekend newscasts; under Northstar, WAPT restored weekend news in November 1990 and began airing a morning newscast in 1992. Argyle made a major shakeup of the station's news talent after it took over in 1995. Two station staples, anchor Stephanie Bell-Flynt and commentator Cal Adams, were fired in September 1995, with Bell-Flynt being replaced on the evening newscasts she anchored. News director Bob Noonan, who had been on the job only seven weeks, defended the firings as necessary to "put a more competitive team on the field".

In the 2000s and 2010s, WAPT became more competitive with WJTV for second place, though both stations continued to trail WLBT. Hearst has expanded the station's news offerings progressively under its ownership. Weekend morning newscasts, sandwiching the weekend editions of Good Morning America, debuted in 2011. In 2020, a 9 p.m. newscast debuted on the station's MeTV subchannel.

== Technical information ==
=== Subchannels ===
WAPT's transmitter facility is co-sited with its studios on Channel 16 Way (off MS 18) in southwest Jackson. The station's signal is multiplexed:

Subchannels of WAPT
Subchannel	Res.	Short name	Programming
16.1	720p	WAPT	ABC
16.2	480i	MeTV-JX	MeTV
16.3	480i	Story	Story Television
16.4	1080i	WAPTCBS	CBS
16.5	480i	GetTV	Great
16.6	480i	HSN	HSN

Subchannel broadcast with MPEG-4 video

=== Analog-to-digital conversion ===
WAPT ended regular programming on its analog signal, over UHF channel 16, on June 12, 2009, as part of the federally mandated transition from analog to digital television. The station's digital signal remained on its pre-transition UHF channel 21, using virtual channel 16.

As part of the SAFER Act, WAPT kept its analog signal on the air until June 26 to inform viewers of the digital television transition through a loop of public service announcements from the National Association of Broadcasters.
