= WMDN =

Television station in Meridian, Mississippi

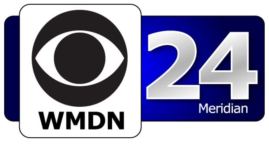
- Meridian, Mississippi; United States
- Channels: Digital: 24 (UHF); Virtual: 24
- Branding: CBS 24

Programming
- Affiliations: 24.1: CBS; for others, see § Subchannels

Ownership
- Owner: Big Horn Television; (BRTV License LLC)
- Operator: Coastal Television Broadcasting Company
- Sister stations: WGBC

History
- First air date: June 10, 1968 (original incarnation); March 23, 1972 (second incarnation); February 2, 1994 (current incarnation)
- Last air date: October 13, 1970 (original incarnation); 1991 (second incarnation)
- Former call signs: WHTV (1968–1970, 1972–1986); WTZH (1986–1991)
- Former channel numbers: Analog: 24 (UHF, 1968–1970, 1972–1991, 1994–2009); Digital: 26 (UHF, 2001–2009)
- Former affiliations: CBS (1968–1970); ABC (secondary, 1968–1970 and 1972–1980); Dark (1970–1972, 1991–1994); NBC (1972–1980, as satellite of WTVA); NBC (secondary, 1980–1982); Fox (NFL games, 1994–1997)
- Call sign meaning: Meridian

Technical information
- Licensing authority: FCC
- Facility ID: 73255
- ERP: 616 kW
- HAAT: 182.1 m (597 ft)
- Transmitter coordinates: 32°19′40″N 88°41′31″W

Links
- Public license information: Public file; LMS
- Website: www.twinstates.news

WMDN (channel 24) is a television station in Meridian, Mississippi, United States, affiliated with CBS. It is owned by Big Horn Television and operated by Coastal Television Broadcasting Company alongside dual Fox/NBC affiliate WGBC (channel 30). The two stations share studios and transmitter facilities on Crestview Circle, in unincorporated Lauderdale County, south of Meridian. Together, WMDN and WGBC are known as "The Meridian Family of Stations".

== History ==
The station started operations on channel 24 on June 10, 1968, under the call sign WHTV. It was originally owned by the Delta Communications Corporation, which was presided over by local businessmen Weyman Walker, and James Britton. WHTV aired programs from CBS and ABC in a secondary manner. Like many UHF start-ups in a previously VHF market, this channel could not gain a significant foothold in ratings or local advertising, especially against the established WTOK-TV, a CBS primary affiliate, and had to go dark on October 13, 1970.

On March 23, 1972, Frank K. Spain bought WHTV and made it a full-time satellite of his WTWV (now WTVA) in Tupelo, which was affiliated with NBC. It also rebroadcast some ABC programs carried by WTWV/WTVA such as college football. Television listings during this time instructed viewers to consult WTWV's listings for WHTV's program schedule. This changed on April 1, 1980, when Spain opted to convert WHTV into a stand-alone station, making it the primary CBS affiliate for Meridian after WTOK changed its affiliation to ABC. WHTV continued to air NBC's Today Show and Tonight Show in the early 1980s; however, the rest of the network's programming was not seen for about two years by area residents except those who could receive, whether over the air or by cable, either Jackson's WLBT or Hattiesburg's WDAM. In 1982, NBC returned to the market on WLBM (now WGBC) as a semi-satellite of WLBT. Meanwhile, in 1986, WHTV changed call letters to WTZH.

The station had to leave the air for a second time because of financial troubles in 1991, leaving eastern Mississippi and portions of western Alabama without a locally-based CBS affiliate. During the gap, Hattiesburg's WHLT and occasionally Selma, Alabama's WAKA were carried by Comcast to provide CBS programming to cable subscribers. Others may have received Jackson's WJTV over the air. Finally, the Spain family returned channel 24 to the air as WMDN on February 2, 1994, in time for the Winter Olympics in Lillehammer, Norway. From that year until 1997, the station aired National Football League games from Fox (which had acquired these games from CBS).

In 1995, WMDN entered into a local marketing agreement (LMA) with WGBC. In January 2008, businessman Wade Threadgill of Austin, Texas, purchased the station and its LMA with WGBC, ending 36 years of Spain family, and Mississippi-based, ownership. On January 5, 2009, Fox moved its affiliation from WTOK to WGBC as the primary affiliation in full HD. Both Fox and NBC programming were then offered in HD on WGBC. This move provided WMDN and WGBC the full complement of three of the Big Four network affiliates.

In 2014, WMDN switched its AccuWeather service on the digital subchannel to entertainment programming Bounce TV on 24.2, and adding NBC-owned Cozi TV on 24.3.

WMDN's license was planned to be spun off to Lance Media, which would have entered into a shared services agreement (SSA) with WGBC (which Standard Media would have acquired outright as part of its purchase of most of the Waypoint Media stations). However, with the collapse of the Waypoint-Standard Media deal in early January 2021, the sale to Lance Media also fell apart.

In July 2021, Waypoint announced that it would sell nine of its television stations, including WGBC, to Cumming, Georgia—based Coastal Television for $36.9 million. WMDN would be sold to Big Horn Television for $2.55 million and operated by Coastal under a LMA. The sale was completed on January 4, 2022.

== News operation ==
In 1994, local newscasts on weeknights at 6 and 10 p.m. were added to the schedules of WMDN and WGBC. From 1991 until 1994, WGBC aired news during the week under the branding WGBC News 30. Those broadcasts ended after local businessman Alex Shields bought majority control of the station. With the introduction of a news department, WMDN simulcasted all of its shows on WGBC as a result of the LMA. Therefore, the newscasts were branded as 24/30 News. The title changed to WMDN News when the broadcasts were dropped from WGBC's lineup. WMDN also aired an hour-long weekday morning show at 6 a.m. for a short time. Despite winning the award for the state's best newscast two years in a row, management decided to cease the production of local news on June 30, 2005. In 2008, under new ownership, the stations began producing and airing five-minute local news, community affairs and weather cut-ins during CBS and NBC morning programming. On September 25, 2017, local newscasts returned to WMDN when the station commissioned the Independent News Network in Little Rock, Arkansas, to produce partly-centralized 6 p.m. and 10 p.m. newscasts on both WMDN and sister station WGBC's DT2 subchannel, collectively named Twin States News. Waypoint Media purchased the Independent News Network's centralized news operation in June 2019 and renamed it to News Hub; News Hub was purchased by Coastal Television in July 2021.

== Technical information ==
=== Subchannels ===
The station's signal is multiplexed:

Subchannels of WMDN
Subchannel	Res.	Short name	Programming
24.1	1080i	CBS	CBS
24.2	480i	Bounce	Bounce TV
24.3	480i	Metv	MeTV
24.4	480i	Grit	Grit
24.5	480i	Laff	Laff
24.6	480i	Mystery	Ion Mystery
24.7	480i	Defy	Ion Plus

=== Analog-to-digital conversion ===
WMDN shut down its analog signal, broadcast over UHF channel 24, on June 12, 2009, the official date when full-power television stations in the United States transitioned from analog to digital broadcasts under federal mandate. The station's digital signal relocated from its pre-transition UHF channel 26 to channel 24 for post-transition operations.
