= WGBC =

Television station in Meridian, Mississippi

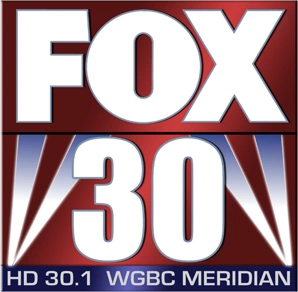

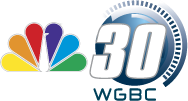
- Meridian, Mississippi; United States
- Channels: Digital: 31 (UHF); Virtual: 30
- Branding: Fox 30, NBC 30; Twin States News

Programming
- Affiliations: 30.1: Fox; 30.2: NBC

Ownership
- Owner: Coastal Television Broadcasting Company; (CTM License LLC)
- Sister stations: WMDN

History
- First air date: June 2, 1982
- Former call signs: WLBM-TV (1982–1991)
- Former channel numbers: Analog: 30 (UHF, 1982–2009)
- Former affiliations: NBC (1982–1990 and 1991–2009, now on 30.2); Dark (1990–1991); RTV (secondary, 2009–2010)
- Call sign meaning: Global Communications (former owner)

Technical information
- Licensing authority: FCC
- Facility ID: 24314
- ERP: 828 kW
- HAAT: 165.3 m (542 ft)
- Transmitter coordinates: 32°19′40″N 88°41′31″W

Links
- Public license information: Public file; LMS
- Website: www.twinstates.news

WGBC (channel 30) is a television station in Meridian, Mississippi, United States, affiliated with Fox and NBC. It is owned by Coastal Television Broadcasting Company and operated alongside CBS affiliate WMDN (channel 24). The two stations share studios and transmitter facilities on Crestview Circle, in unincorporated Lauderdale County, south of Meridian. Together, WGBC and WMDN are known as "The Meridian Family of Stations".

== History ==
The first channel 30 to operate in Meridian began broadcasting as WCOC-TV in 1954. It was owned by the Crystal Oil Company along with WCOC radio (910 AM, now WMOG). The station had hoped to pick up the CBS affiliation for the area due to its radio sister's long affiliation with CBS Radio. However, the network ended up affiliating with WTOK-TV on the more powerful VHF channel 11. This resulted in WCOC going dark after only a few months on the air, as it began telecasting on April 7, 1954, and signed off on August 1. WCOC attempted to relocate to Pachuta in order to broadcast on VHF channel 7, but the channel allocation eventually went to WDAM-TV when said channel relocated from channel 9 to 7.

The analog channel 30 allotment remained dark until WLBT in Jackson filed for a new station to serve eastern Mississippi in December 1980; a construction permit was issued on September 14, 1981. The station took to the air on June 2, 1982, as WLBM-TV, a low-powered semi-satellite. Previously, NBC programming had been available to eastern Mississippi viewers on WTOK-TV part-time from 1953 until 1972 or on WHTV (now WMDN, channel 24) from 1972 to 1980. WLBM's studios caught fire on April 17, 1990, knocking the station off the air and leaving much of Eastern Mississippi without an over-the-air NBC affiliate. While the station originally was slated to return to the air, Civic Communications decided against it a month later. Cable systems provided network programming from either Hattiesburg's WDAM-TV or WLBT for subscribers.

NBC returned to the market when Global Communications bought the dormant channel 30 license and resumed operations as WGBC on September 15, 1991. Thus, Meridian became one of the last markets in the nation with a local full-time NBC affiliate. It entered into a local marketing agreement (LMA) with CBS affiliate WMDN. In January 2008, local businessman Michael Reed (owner of Waypoint Media) bought WGBC and renewed the LMA with WMDN.

In late 2008, WGBC picked up the Fox affiliation for Meridian on its first digital subchannel with the Retro Television Network (RTV) airing during non-network time periods. This change resulted in NBC moving to a new second digital subchannel in high definition while remaining on the analog signal. "Fox Meridian" launched on January 5, 2009. Fox had previously aired on a subchannel of WTOK-TV, while RTV was new to the market. The move allowed Fox programming to be offered in HD for the first time in the area.

This creative arrangement resulted in NBC being moved to a new second digital subchannel. It is a similar case to CBS affiliate WAGM-TV in Presque Isle, Maine, which also moved its original affiliation to a new second digital subchannel so that its main signal could join Fox. In fall 2010, the Fox channel had acquired enough first-run syndicated programming that Retro TV was dropped from the station, and took on a full-time branding of "Fox 30".

In July 2021, Waypoint announced that they would sell nine of its television stations, including WGBC, to Cumming, Georgia—based Coastal Television for $36.9 million. WMDN would be sold to Big Horn Television for $2.55 million and operated by Coastal under a LMA. The sales were completed on January 4, 2022.

== News operation ==
From 1991 until 1994, WGBC aired local newscasts during the week that were known as WGBC News 30. This was the first attempt in the market to provide an alternative news source to WTOK. The broadcasts ended, though, after local businessman Alex Shields bought majority control of WGBC.

With WMDN's third launch in 1994, local newscasts weeknights at 6 and 10 p.m. were included on the station's schedule. It also aired an hour-long weekday morning show at 6 a.m. for a short period of time. Since the LMA existed between WMDN and WGBC at this point, the former began simulcasting newscasts on this station. As a result, the shows were branded as 24/30 News. The title changed to WMDN News when the broadcasts were subsequently dropped from WGBC's lineup. As was the case with WGBC's earlier attempt at operating a news department, WMDN was forced to shut down its own newscast production efforts in 2005, being unable to compete with WTOK and maintain consistent viewership.

A few years later, WGBC and WMDN began airing five-minute local weather cut-ins during the NBC and CBS national morning shows on weekdays. Although this would be discontinued, the two outlets continue to air a cut-in branded as The Morning Report with Angie Denney featuring a listing of community events. There is also a cooking segment seen during the update on Mondays known as Local Flavor.

On September 20, 2015, Waypoint Media announced that WGBC would expand its news programming with the addition of a half-hour prime time newscast at 9 p.m.—the first such program in the Meridian market—to premiere on October 5. Despite maintaining an LMA with WMDN, the WGBC newscast was the only full-scale newscasts seen on the two stations, with WMDN continuing to only air news and weather cut-ins. This changed, however, on September 25, 2017, when WGBC-DT2 and WMDN launched 6 and 10 p.m. newscasts; the stations had commissioned the Independent News Network in Little Rock, Arkansas to produce partly-centralized newscasts, collectively named Twin States News. Waypoint Media purchased the Independent News Network's centralized news operation in June 2019 and renamed it to News Hub; News Hub was purchased by Coastal Television in July 2021.

== Technical information ==
=== Subchannels ===
The station's signal is multiplexed:

Subchannels of WGBC
| Subchannel | Res. | Short name | Programming |
|---|---|---|---|
| 30.1 | 720p | FOX HD | Fox |
| 30.2 | 1080i | WGBC HD | NBC |

=== Analog-to-digital conversion ===
WGBC shut down its analog signal, over UHF channel 30, on June 12, 2009, the official date when full-power television stations in the United States transitioned from analog to digital broadcasts under federal mandate. The station's digital signal remained on its pre-transition UHF channel 31, using virtual channel 30.
