= WDAM-TV =

Television station in Laurel, Mississippi

- Laurel–Hattiesburg, Mississippi; United States
- City: Laurel, Mississippi
- Channels: Digital: 7 (VHF); Virtual: 7
- Branding: WDAM 7

Programming
- Affiliations: 7.1: NBC; 7.2: ABC; for others, see § Subchannels

Ownership
- Owner: Gray Media; (Gray Television Licensee, LLC)
- Sister stations: WHPM-LD, WLHA-LD

History
- First air date: June 8, 1956
- Former call signs: WDAM (1956–1978)
- Former channel numbers: Analog: 9 (VHF, 1956–1959), 7 (VHF, 1959–2009); Digital: 28 (UHF, 2001–2010)
- Former affiliations: All secondary: ABC (1956–1962); NTA (1956–1961); UPN (Star Trek: Voyager, 1995–1996)
- Call sign meaning: David A. Matison (founding owner)

Technical information
- Licensing authority: FCC
- Facility ID: 21250
- ERP: 75 kW
- HAAT: 155 m (509 ft)
- Transmitter coordinates: 31°27′13″N 89°17′05″W

Links
- Public license information: Public file; LMS
- Website: www.wdam.com

WDAM-TV (channel 7) is a television station licensed to Laurel, Mississippi, United States, serving the Hattiesburg area as an affiliate of NBC and ABC. It is owned by Gray Media alongside low-power Telemundo affiliate WLHA-LD (channel 18), and is co-managed with low-power Fox affiliate WHPM-LD (channel 23). The three stations share studios on US 11 in unincorporated Moselle in southern Jones County, where WDAM-TV's transmitter is also located.

== History ==
WDAM-TV, named for the initials of the original owner David A. Matison, signed on June 8, 1956, airing an analog signal on VHF channel 9, then allocated to Hattiesburg. The station was the first to broadcast in southern Mississippi. At that time it carried both NBC and ABC. During the late 1950s, the station was also briefly affiliated with the NTA Film Network. Meanwhile, in 1957, the Laurel Television Company won its bid for a new station on channel 7, which took the call letters WTLM. The company was owned by William S. Smylie, the mayor of Meridian, and had been able to secure the permit when Meridian's silent UHF station, WCOC-TV, dropped its proposal to move channel 7 from Laurel to Pachuta for its use.

The Lion Television Corporation, which was the licensee of WDAM-TV, became majority-owned by New Orleans station WDSU-TV in 1956; WDAM already received all of its network programs from that station via microwave link. WDSU also owned a controlling stake in the Modern Broadcasting Company, which owned WAFB-TV, a struggling UHF station in Baton Rouge. In October 1957, Lion proposed to the FCC that channel 9 be moved from Hattiesburg to Baton Rouge for WAFB-TV's use, with WDAM-TV reaching an agreement to take over the channel 7 Laurel allocation; in the application, the company noted that it felt that the market could only sustain one commercial television station. The FCC initially turned down the application in May 1958, but it ultimately permitted the change in 1959, provided that the Baton Rouge station compete with other applicants for use of channel 9. On September 3, 1959, WDAM-TV moved to channel 7 at Laurel, leaving the Pine Belt with one VHF station. Coinciding with the move, Smylie's group—having held the chapter 7 construction permit the whole time—became the South Mississippi Television Company and bought the physical plant, taking operational control of the station.

In 1962, WDAM dropped its secondary ABC affiliation to become a sole NBC affiliate. In 1967, WDAM-TV purchased WCFT-TV of Tuscaloosa, Alabama. The license holder changed its name to Service Broadcasters, Inc. In 1978, Beam Broadcasters purchased the stations from Service Broadcasters; it ultimately owned three stations before almost being foreclosed on in 1989 to satisfy $45 million of debt that Beam owed Chase Bank; the company went into bankruptcy, emerged as Beacon Communications Corporation, and sold WDAM to Federal Broadcasting in 1990. The station was acquired by Raycom Media in 1997. However, Raycom owned WHLT at the time and had to sell it to Media General in order to comply with Federal Communications Commission (FCC) duopoly rules. In 2008, the station added a new position, web manager, and updated its website to conform to modern standards. That same year, the station launched "wdamtogo.com", a site designed for internet-capable mobile devices. In 2010, the station launched news and weather smart phone applications along with a photo and video sharing service called "Send It to Seven". In 2011, the station launched a secondary set of websites for each community of over 20,000 people in the station's viewing area called "WDAM Neighborhoods"; those sites were retired in early 2014. In early 2012, WDAM launched tablet applications.

Over the years, WDAM has been home to personnel who achieved fame either locally or nationally. Bobby Smith worked at the station since a week after it signed on until 2011. Weathercaster Jim Gibbon was a staple of WDAM's weekday morning and noon shows for 43 years until his retirement in March 2007. He died nearly two months later on April 25. Sports director Mitchell Williams retired in 2011 after 27 years at the station. In January 2012, William "Dubbie" White retired after 45 years with the station. Jim Cameron retired in 2013 after 22 years as general manager. Randy Swan, formerly news director for 24 years, and news anchor was with the station for over three decades leaving for only a brief period when he served in the same position with WABG-TV in the Greenwood–Greenville, Mississippi market. Swan's father, Jimmy Swan, was a well known radio personality and country/bluegrass singer/bandleader during the late 1950s and 1960s who also ran for Governor of Mississippi. Randy Swan retired in 2015 and his last day on air was February 27, 2015. Miranda Beard was with the station nearly three decades. Her last day on air was February 25, 2016. Current Good Morning America co-host Robin Roberts was a sports anchor at WDAM in the early 1980s, and her sister Sally-Ann Roberts worked there every other weekend until she was recruited by New Orleans station WWL-TV.

In 2001, the station signed on its digital signal on UHF channel 28. WDAM signed off its analog signal on June 12, 2009, and began broadcasting exclusively in digital. With the digital television transition, the station added two new channels to its lineup on 7.2 and 7.3. On January 28, 2010, WDAM moved from UHF channel 28 to the pre-digital allotment on VHF channel 7. An early field test showed a dramatically improved signal in areas that were lost after the original digital transition.

On May 30, 2012, Raycom Media and ABC jointly announced that WDAM had entered into a long-term affiliation agreement. This resulted in WDAM-DT2 dropping This TV in favor of ABC on June 11. Prior to the change, ABC had not been seen locally in the Hattiesburg–Laurel market since 1962 after the main WDAM channel dropped its secondary arrangement with the network. After that, WLOX in Biloxi began serving as the Pine Belt's default affiliate and would subsequently become a sister outlet to WDAM in 2006.

By March 2020, the over-the-air feed of WDAM-DT2 was upgraded into 720p HD; it had been airing in the 4:3 standard definition picture format, before then.

=== Sale to Gray Television ===
On June 25, 2018, Atlanta-based Gray Television announced it had reached an agreement with Raycom to merge their respective broadcasting assets (consisting of Raycom's 63 existing owned-and/or-operated television stations, including WDAM-TV), and Gray's 93 television stations) under the former's corporate umbrella. The cash-and-stock merger transaction valued at $3.6 billion—in which Gray shareholders would acquire preferred stock currently held by Raycom—resulted in WDAM-TV gaining new sister stations in nearby markets, including CBS/ABC affiliate KNOE-TV in Monroe, Louisiana, and ABC affiliate WTOK-TV in Meridian. The combined company is now in every Mississippi market except for Greenville and Columbus–Tupelo as a result. The sale was approved on December 20, and was completed on January 2, 2019.

In mid-2021, Gray launched a low-power television station, WLHA-LD on UHF channel 18, with three blank subchannels (18.1, 18.2, 18.3) with forthcoming programming and a repeater of WDAM's main channel on 18.4, remapped to channel 7.10. On April 13, 2023, WDAM announced that WLHA had picked up the Telemundo affiliation for the Pine Belt area. The repeater of WDAM's main channel has since been discontinued.

== Programming ==
WDAM carried Star Trek: Voyager during the 1995–1996 season, airing the UPN program at 6 p.m. on Saturdays.

On December 30, 2023, WDAM-TV parent company Gray Television announced it had reached an agreement with the New Orleans Pelicans to air 10 games on the station during the 2023–24 season.

On September 17, 2024, Gray and the Pelicans announced a broader deal to form the Gulf Coast Sports & Entertainment Network, which would broadcast nearly all 2024–25 Pelicans games on Gray's stations in the Gulf South, including WDAM-TV.

=== Newscasts ===
Since WDAM is the only local television station to offer the most newscasts, it has traditionally been a ratings powerhouse. As a semi-satellite of Jackson's WJTV, rival CBS affiliate WHLT provides local coverage. WHLT airs a 30-minute local newscast weeknights at 10 p.m. In addition, the only other newscast simulcast on WHLT is WJTV's weekday morning show. WLOX in Biloxi, also owned by Gray Television, shares resources with WDAM.

With the addition of ABC network programming on WDAM-DT2, simulcasts of some local newscasts from the main channel are included on its schedule. More specifically, this includes the entire weekday morning show as well as weeknight broadcasts at 5 and 10. An exclusive newscast airs weeknights at 6:30 on WDAM-DT2. Weekend simulcasts include Saturdays at 6 p.m. and both nights at 10. With the simulcasts, however, there can be delays and/or preemptions on one programming service due to network obligations. WDAM's half-hour early afternoon newscast at noon and weeknight 6 p.m. newscast are not seen on the second subchannel.

On September 10, 2012, WDAM became the first television station in the Pine Belt to broadcast its newscasts in high definition. This included a new set and weather center, along with HD versions of its graphics.

==== Notable former on-air staff ====
- Robin Roberts
- Chuck Scarborough
- Cindy Williams

== Subchannels ==
The station's signal is multiplexed:

Subchannels of WDAM-TV
Subchannel	Res.	Short name	Programming
7.1	1080i	WDAM DT	NBC
7.2	720p	ABC	ABC
7.3	480i	Bounce	Bounce TV (4:3)
7.4	480i	TruCrim	True Crime Network (4:3)
7.5	480i	GCSEN	Gulf Coast Sports & Entertainment Network
7.6	480i	Grit	Grit
