= WNTZ-TV =

Television station in Natchez, Mississippi

- Natchez, Mississippi; Alexandria, Louisiana; United States
- City: Natchez, Mississippi
- Channels: Digital: 15 (UHF); Virtual: 48
- Branding: WNTZ Fox 48

Programming
- Affiliations: 48.1: Fox/MyNetworkTV; for others, see § Subchannels

Ownership
- Owner: Nexstar Media Group; (Nexstar Media Inc.)

History
- First air date: November 16, 1985
- Former call signs: WNTZ (1985–2009)
- Former channel numbers: Analog: 48 (UHF, 1985–2009); Digital: 49 (UHF, 2003–2019)
- Former affiliations: Independent (1985–1988); Silent (1988–1991); Channel America (1991–1995 on K47DW)
- Call sign meaning: Natchez

Technical information
- Licensing authority: FCC
- Facility ID: 16539
- ERP: 530 kW
- HAAT: 312.4 m (1,025 ft)
- Transmitter coordinates: 31°40′8.6″N 91°41′30.5″W
- Translator(s): K22NI-D Leesville, LA; K30QG-D Alexandria, LA

Links
- Public license information: Public file; LMS
- Website: www.cenlanow.com

WNTZ-TV (channel 48) is a television station licensed to Natchez, Mississippi, United States, serving the Alexandria, Louisiana, area as an affiliate of Fox and MyNetworkTV. The station is owned by Nexstar Media Group, and has studios on Parliament Drive in Alexandria. Its main transmitter is located near Jonesville, Louisiana, with two low-power translators in Alexandria and Leesville. Although Natchez is part of the Jackson, Mississippi, television market, which receives Fox programming from WDBD, WNTZ-TV is assigned by Nielsen to the Alexandria market.

WNTZ's master control operation was located in Lafayette at the studios of then-sister stations KADN-TV and KLAF-LD from 1991 until July 2015. It was then moved to the Baton Rouge studios of NBC affiliate WVLA-TV, fellow Fox affiliate WGMB-TV, CW affiliate WBRL-CD and independent station KZUP-CD.

== History ==
=== First incarnation of WNTZ ===
WNTZ was granted its license to Louisiana state senator Bill Atkins of Jonesville, via his company MSLA Broadcasting, on January 31, 1985, and signed on the air on November 16.

WNTZ began as an independent station, with a special on The Honeymooners serving as its inaugural program. Advertised as "Your Channel by the River", WNTZ's original programming consisted of local and syndicated programming exclusively to the Miss-Lou area, which covered a larger broadcasting footprint into Mississippi than exists today. The station originally had only news updates but was broadcasting full scheduled newscasts by 1988 at 5:30 and 10 p.m. Its original studios were located at 26 Colonel John Pitchford Parkway (then 625 Beltline Highway) in Natchez, Mississippi.

WNTZ's fortunes quickly eroded, and it was placed in bankruptcy for the first time around 1986. During the bankruptcy proceedings, there were unsuccessful attempts to sell the station to new owners. In 1987, the Federal Savings and Loan Insurance Corporation (FSLIC) seized the Sunbelt Federal Bank of Baton Rouge, which had foreclosed on a loan to Atkins and had held the station's assets. After a yearlong attempt to sell channel 48 failed, the FSLIC took it dark on April 8, 1988. The station remained silent for three years until 1991 when the station's license was sold to businessman Charles Chatelain and his company, Delta Media Corporation, both based in Lafayette, Louisiana.

=== WNTZ returns under Delta Media ownership and Fox affiliation ===
Under Delta Media ownership, the goal was to give Alexandria, Louisiana, a full Fox network affiliation. However, a few challenges were ahead. WNTZ's license is designated to Natchez, Mississippi, where its transmitter and tower are located behind the station's original studios. Executives at Fox were concerned about giving WNTZ its affiliation because Natchez was part of the same media market (DMA) as Jackson, Mississippi, which already had a Fox affiliate. To alleviate this problem, the original transmitter and broadcast equipment was sold to future WNTZ owner Communications Corporation of America (CCA or ComCorp) and moved to sign on WGMB-TV in Baton Rouge. This was done in order to build a new tower and transmitter site in the small farming community of Frogmore, in neighboring Concordia Parish, Louisiana. Fox in turn granted WNTZ the Fox affiliation for the Alexandria market.

Also, WNTZ's broadcasting operation would be relocated to Lafayette, Louisiana, housed at its sister station, KADN-TV. The license would remain in Natchez, even though its tower and transmitter site were moved across to the Louisiana side of the Mississippi River and its base of operation would also move. In 1991, Delta Media Corporation moved administrative, sales and marketing operations to Pineville, Louisiana, to have its main base of operation within the footprint of the Alexandria DMA. Later in 1996, Delta Media purchased office space and moved operations to Jackson Street in Alexandria's Garden District, with the intent to move the station's broadcast capability from its sister station KADN in Lafayette to the newly purchased building. Although administrative, sales, and marketing moved to Alexandria, broadcasting WNTZ's signal from the building never materialized because Delta Media sold the station's operation in 1997 to White Knight Broadcasting (transferred ten years later to parent company Communications Corporation of America).

The original tower which transmitted WNTZ's signal in 1985 remains behind its original studio building in Natchez, but it now only relays a live microwave transmission signal to the main transmitter tower in Frogmore for Emergency Alert System (EAS) broadcasts, per FCC requirement. WQNZ 95.1 and WKSO 97.3 also use the tower to broadcast their signal.

Since Natchez is the official FCC city of license, Delta Media maintained a satellite office within the studios in Natchez, even though the station began shifting its focus to the Alexandria market in 1991, and removed or sold all non-essential broadcasting equipment from the studio. Delta Media (and later White Knight Broadcasting) used the Natchez studio as a sales office. Similar to its operations in Alexandria, Delta Media, then later White Knight and Communications Corporation of America, paid monthly rent for use of the original studio to the building's owners.

==== K30QG-D ====
On July 1, 1991, Delta Media signed on K47DW on analog channel 47, relaying the programming of Delta Media's flagship station, Fox affiliate KADN-TV in Lafayette, for the Alexandria market.

Shortly after signing on, K47DW began airing commercials and legal identification separately from KADN, renaming its brand as "Fox 47".

After Delta Media purchased the WNTZ license, moved the transmitter and tower site, and signed it back on for the second time, the Fox affiliation officially moved to WNTZ's designated analog channel 48.

K47DW then became an affiliate of the Channel America network until 1995, when it began simulcasting WNTZ to serve portions of Alexandria where channel 48's signal is weak.

The call sign was changed to K47DW-D on July 5, 2012, following the transition to digital transmission, and then to K30QG-D on October 21, 2019.

=== Under White Knight/ComCorp ownership ===
Delta Media sold its television properties in Alexandria and Lafayette. In 1997, WNTZ was sold to Sheldon Galloway's White Knight Broadcasting, an offspring company of Communications Corporation of America, owned by his father, Thomas Galloway.

In an unusual situation, the offices in Alexandria and Natchez remained in control of Delta Media. White Knight paid monthly rent to Delta Media to remain in the offices until 2007. Then the WNTZ operation moved a third time to rented space along Parliament Drive in the Noles-Frye building, a local real estate agency. The Natchez office remained a sales office until 2011; it later served as the site for special projects and social media staff during the station's last years under ComCorp ownership.

Thomas created CCA when he signed on Fox affiliate WGMB in Baton Rouge from the purchase and move of the original transmitter for WNTZ. White Knight was founded by Sheldon in 1996 after the purchase of NBC affiliate WVLA-TV in Baton Rouge. CCA eventually purchased KADN in Lafayette from Delta Media outright in 2004, after a long-term Local marketing agreement (LMA).

WNTZ, WGMB, WVLA and KADN make up the "core four" on which both CCA and White Knight companies were built. Under White Knight, WNTZ saw many of its biggest changes, most notably in the early-to-mid 2000s.

When a Fox affiliate became unavailable in Jackson after WDBD changed affiliations to The WB in 2001, WNTZ served as the market's de facto Fox affiliate, along with Foxnet for Jackson-area cable subscribers. White Knight considered relocating WNTZ's main transmitter tower back to Mississippi at a site east of Natchez such that the station could serve as an over the air affiliate for more viewers in the South and Central Mississippi areas, making its Frogmore transmitter a translator station. This ended when Vicksburg station WUFX-TV (now WLOO) signed on the air in 2003. Ironically, both WDBD and WUFX were owned by Jackson Television, managed through a LMA by CCA/White Knight.

WNTZ, as a Fox affiliate, struggled for a number of years to catch hold of viewers in the Alexandria market, mostly due to longtime Alexandria television stations KALB-TV (channel 5) and KLAX-TV (channel 31). That changed in 2003, with the popularity of Fox first-run programming, sports programming and aggressive marketing tactics.

In May 2006, WNTZ ranked #1 in adult viewers 18–49 during common prime time programming (7–9 p.m. Central Time) for the first time in the station's history, beating longtime rival KALB. The feat was repeated a second time in February 2007, and has retained a strong second place hold in the Alexandria market since.

This improvement is despite many challenges facing a station using a network of broadcast towers. This was coupled with the long-standing thought by its competitors and some Alexandria viewers that WNTZ was "non-local" station, due to its license in Natchez and being corporate-owned. In actuality, until 2015, WNTZ was owned by Louisiana-based companies (White Knight/CCA and previously Delta Media), where both KALB (since 1993) and KLAX (since 1988) were and are still owned by companies not based in Louisiana. WNTZ used the "Louisiana Home Grown" slogan in 2004 as a demonstration of this. WNTZ officially lost this designation in 2015 with the sale of the station to Nexstar Broadcasting Group.

==== Secondary affiliation with MyNetworkTV ====
On January 24, 2006, The WB and UPN networks announced they would merge into a new single network, The CW. In turn, Fox owner News Corporation announced the creation of MyNetworkTV for those stations left out in the cold due to The CW merger.

WNTZ became MyNetworkTV's home under a secondary affiliation agreement, officially launched on September 5, 2006. The network began to air on a timed tape-delay basis from 9 to 11 p.m. Monday through Friday, immediately after Fox prime time programming aired. In the early years of the network, when nightly English-language telenovela programs aired, the Saturday recap episodes were preempted to air on WNTZ Sunday nights after Fox prime time. Occasionally, due to time overruns of Fox programs, MyNetworkTV will run later than its scheduled time on WNTZ, but does run in its entirety.

On September 9, 2013, due to the return of The Arsenio Hall Show to late night television on WNTZ, MyNetworkTV was moved to air from 11 p.m. to 1 a.m. This changed again in September 2014 due to the well-publicized Arsenio cancellation. MyNetworkTV programs then aired from 10 p.m. until midnight Monday through Friday; they now and currently air as before, from 9 to 11 p.m.

KBCA, which held The WB affiliation a mere six months prior to the announced CW merger, was announced as the Alexandria affiliate of The CW, which commenced operations on September 18, 2006. Former UPN station KWCE-LP (channel 36 at the time), became an affiliate of Retro Television Network (now a Me-TV affiliate), and moved to channel 27 on the television dial.

==== WNTZ experiences second bankruptcy ====
Even though the television ratings improved for WNTZ, the station faced financial difficulty.

In June 2006, White Knight Broadcasting filed for Chapter 11 bankruptcy protection. A company press release stated, viewers and staff would "see no changes at the station". White Knight emerged from bankruptcy in October 2007. During the bankruptcy proceedings, White Knight asked to merge many of the stations it owned, including WNTZ, into the fold of its parent company, Communications Corporation of America.

The license change was granted by the FCC, and WNTZ was officially changed over to ComCorp of Alexandria License Corporation, named after the station's market designation.

=== Sale to Nexstar Broadcasting Group ===
On April 24, 2013, ComCorp announced the sale of its entire group (including WNTZ) to the Nexstar Broadcasting Group. The sale was completed on January 1, 2015. Following the sale, on May 27, 2015, Nexstar management officially closed the Natchez studio, which had been used for special projects and social media staff since 2011, with no formal announcement made of its closure. In late 2016, WNTZ added three networks from Katz Broadcasting to its subchannels: Bounce TV on 48.2, Escape TV on 48.3, and Laff TV on 48.4.

== Unique station characteristics ==
WNTZ's broadcasting is a loosely defined "network" of one main transmitter and two translator transmitters that serve residents in three television markets—Alexandria (the DMA that is officially rated by Nielsen Media Research); the southernmost portion of the Monroe, Louisiana–El Dorado, Arkansas market (where the station's main transmitter tower is located); and the westernmost portion of the Jackson market (the location of Natchez, the station's city of license assigned by the Federal Communications Commission (FCC)).

Despite being licensed to Natchez, WNTZ is not carried on cable or satellite there. Sparklight, which services the Natchez, MS–Vidalia, LA area, carries Jackson's Fox affiliate WDBD (and other Jackson stations) for the Natchez side of its service area. WNTZ is carried on the Vidalia side. This is despite Natchez and Vidalia being served by the same cable headend (PSID #003002).

== Attempts to broadcast news ==
WNTZ aired news updates during its first incarnation in the mid-1980s. When it returned to the air in 1991, the station did not broadcast newscasts.

In August 2007, WNTZ debuted Fox News Louisiana AM in Alexandria to counter KALB and KLAX's national morning shows. Produced out of sister station WGMB in Baton Rouge, the newscast featured "local" news segments and eight weather updates an hour. Even though Fox News Louisiana AM was more "localized", content direct from the Alexandria area rarely aired. On December 2, 2008, WGMB canceled the newscast due to cost-saving measures. The station has not aired any locally produced newscasts since; however, since becoming a Nexstar property, WNTZ airs weather and brief news capsules produced by sister station KLFY of Lafayette. In late 2022, WNTZ began simulcasting NewsNation's Early Morning and Morning in America news programs from 5 to 9 a.m.

== Technical information ==
=== Subchannels ===
The station's signal is multiplexed:

Subchannels of WNTZ-TV
Subchannel	Res.	Short name	Programming
48.1	720p	WNTZ-DT	Fox/MyNetworkTV
48.2	480i	Bounce	Bounce TV
48.3	480i	Escape	Ion Mystery
48.4	480i	Laff	Laff

=== Translators ===
City of license	Callsign	Subchannel	ERP	HAAT	Facility ID	Transmitter coordinates
Leesville	K22NI-D	22	15 kW	135 m (443 ft)	16540	31°14′08″N 93°12′04″W
Alexandria	K30QG-D	30	10 kW	112 m (367 ft)	10405	31°16′05″N 92°26′24″W

The following two translators had their licenses canceled, due to the transition from analog to digital transmission.

- K61GO channel 61 in Hicks, Louisiana
- K67GL channel 67 in Bunkie, Louisiana

=== Analog-to-digital conversion ===
WNTZ-TV shut down its analog signal, over Ultra high frequency (UHF) channel 48, at 9:03 p.m. on February 17, 2009, the original target date on which full-power television stations in the United States were to transition from analog to digital broadcasts under federal mandate (which was later pushed back to June 12, 2009). Immediately after American Idol ended, WNTZ ran "The Star-Spangled Banner" (the footage was dated from 1940, so the flag in the clip had only 48 stars, ironically coinciding with the channel number) and then the analog signal shut off. Digital antenna and cable viewers went immediately into scheduled MyNetworkTV programming.

The station's digital signal remained on its pre-transition UHF channel 49. Digital television receivers, including the low-power translator stations K22NI-D and K30QG-D, display WNTZ-TV's virtual channel as 48.

The low-power translators surrounding Alexandria will remain operational for the foreseeable future, even though two of the four have been shut off due to the remaining two translators being converted to low-power digital broadcast.
