= CW 44 =

CW 44 may refer the following U.S. television stations affiliated with The CW network:

== Current ==
- WGMB-DT2, a simulcast of WBRL-CD in Baton Rouge, Louisiana (O&O)

== Former ==
- KBCW (now KPYX) in San Francisco, California (2006–2023)
- WTOG in Tampa–St. Petersburg, Florida (2006–2023)
