= WBMS-CA =

Television station in Jackson, Mississippi (1987–2012)

Translator of WXMS-LP
- Jackson, Mississippi; United States
- Channels: Analog: 10 (VHF)
- Branding: MeTV Jackson

Programming
- Affiliations: America's Voice (1993–1997); UPN (1997–2001, 2003–2005); America One (secondary, 1997–2001 and 2002–2003; primary 2001–2002); Pax (2002–2003); Independent (1987–1993, 2005–2011); MeTV (2011–2012)

Ownership
- Owner: American Spirit Media; (WDBD License Subsidiary, LLC)
- Operator: Raycom Media
- Sister stations: WDBD, WLOO, WXMS-LP

History
- Founded: February 10, 1986
- First air date: November 30, 1987
- Last air date: April 20, 2012
- Former call signs: W10BD (1987–1995); WMVT-LP (1995-1997); WBMS-LP (1997–2003)

Technical information
- Facility ID: 23473
- Class: CA
- ERP: 3 kW
- Transmitter coordinates: 32°12′47.0″N 90°22′54.0″W

WBMS-CA (channel 10) was a low-power, Class A television station in Jackson, Mississippi, United States. It was a translator of WXMS-LP (channel 27) which was owned by American Spirit Media.

== History ==
WBMS-CA began broadcasting on November 30, 1987, as independent station W10BD. It was owned by Louisiana state senator Louis "Woody" Jenkins and his company Great Oaks Broadcasting. Jenkins owned two stations in Baton Rouge−WBTR (channel 36) and WTNC (channel 21). On December 6, 1993, the station affiliated with America's Voice. The following year, he sold the station to Metrovision, a startup cable company, who changed the call sign to WMVT-LP in 1995.

In 1997, the station's call sign was changed to WBMS-LP (later WBMS-CA), and joined the UPN network, with America One a secondary affiliation. In 2001, WBMS dropped UPN and moved America One to primary status. In 2002, the station joined Pax and pushed America One back to secondary status. On June 1, 2003, WBMS dropped Pax and America One, and rejoined UPN as a simulcast of WXMS-LP. In 2004, Jackson Television, LLC acquired WBMS and WXMS. As of 2012, WBMS still operated as a simulcast of WXMS. However, on April 20, WBMS' analog transmitter failed.

Vicksburg Broadcasting filed to sell WBMS-CA and WUFX to American Spirit Media in July 2012. As part of the deal, WBMS' operations were to be taken over by Raycom Media, owner of NBC affiliate WLBT (channel 3), under a shared services agreement; American Spirit also acquired Fox affiliate WDBD (channel 40) and WXMS-LP from Roundtable Broadcasting, with the WUFX license being sold to Tougaloo College (though it operates that station, now MyNetworkTV affiliate WLOO (channel 35), under a joint sales agreement). American Spirit Media never returned WBMS to the air; on May 1, 2013, the Federal Communications Commission canceled its license for failure to broadcast for a year.
