= WBM =

WBM is an acronym that may refer to:

- Vo language (ISO code wbm)
- Wapenamanda Airport (IATA code WBM)
- West Bend–Mallard Community School District, Iowa, United States
- World Basketball Manager, a series of video games
- World Brand Management, a former name of the brand Björn Borg
- Wireless Battle of the Mesh, an annual convention on wireless mesh networking protocols and community-owned network infrastructure

== See also ==
- WBMS (disambiguation)
