= KBTR =

KBTR may refer to:

- the ICAO code for Baton Rouge Metropolitan Airport
- KBTR-CD, a television station (channel 36) licensed to Baton Rouge, Louisiana, United States
