= WXMS =

WXMS may refer to:

- WXMS-LP, a defunct television station (channel 27) formerly licensed to serve Jackson, Mississippi, United States
- WSNO-FM, a radio station (97.9 FM) licensed to serve Au Sable, New York, United States, which held the call sign WXMS from 2018 to 2022
- WPDP-CD, a television station (channel 25) licensed to serve Cleveland, Tennessee, United States, which held the call sign WXMS-LP from January to October 2000
