= KWCE-LP =

Television station in Alexandria, Louisiana (2000–2021)

- Alexandria, Louisiana; United States
- Channels: Analog: 27 (UHF)
- Branding: MeTV Alexandria

Programming
- Affiliations: Defunct

Ownership
- Owner: Cox Media Group; (Lost Coast Broadcasting LLC)
- Sister stations: KLAX-TV

History
- First air date: 2000
- Last air date: February 1, 2021 (license canceled)
- Former call signs: K36DS (1994–2004)
- Former channel numbers: Analog: 36 (UHF, 2000–2006)
- Former affiliations: UPN (2000–2006); America One (secondary, 2000–2006); UATV (secondary, 2000–2006); RTV (2006–2012); MeTV (2012–2021)

Technical information
- Licensing authority: FCC
- Facility ID: 40521
- ERP: 12.3 kW
- HAAT: 129 m (423 ft)
- Transmitter coordinates: 31°18′25″N 92°24′12″W
- Translator(s): KLAX-DT 31.2 (UHF) Alexandria

Links
- Public license information: LMS

KWCE-LP (channel 27) was a low-power analog television station in Alexandria, Louisiana, United States, which operated from 2000 to 2021. In its latter years, it was owned by Cox Media Group as an affiliate of MeTV; it had common ownership with ABC affiliate KLAX-TV (channel 31). KWCE-LP's operations were last housed at KLAX-TV's studios on England Drive/LA 498 in Alexandria; the station's transmitter was located on Bayou Maria Road in Pineville.

KWCE-LP did not broadcast a digital signal of its own, and there were no plans to convert the station's signal to digital. In addition, the analog station's low-power signal contour was limited to the immediate Alexandria area. Therefore, in order to reach the entire market, KWCE-LP was simulcast in widescreen standard definition on KLAX-TV's second digital subchannel, which eventually became its permanent over-the-air conduit.

Cox Media Group surrendered KWCE-LP's broadcast license to the Federal Communications Commission (FCC) for cancellation on February 1, 2021. The former KWCE-LP continues under KLAX-TV's license.

== History ==
Plans for a new TV station in Central Louisiana occurred in the early 1990s. Tiger Eye Broadcasting of Miami, Florida, held the license for K36DS. In mid-2000, state representative Woody Jenkins purchased K36DS and launched it as Alexandria's first standalone UPN affiliate; prior to 2000, UPN's programming was carried on a secondary basis by KLAX-TV. The station went by the call letters "KCLA", even though the official call sign remained K36DS; this practice was similar to Jenkins' Baton Rouge station, KBTR-LP, which went by "WBTR" in order to be in line with other Baton Rouge television stations.

Despite the UPN affiliation, KCLA was unable to attain cable coverage in the Central Louisiana area. On March 1, 2002, Pollack/Belz Broadcasting purchased KCLA from Woody Jenkins, and the station gained cable carriage in the region. At the time, KCLA also aired programming from America One and UATV on a secondary basis, similar to WBTR, but programming from those two networks soon disappeared after the acquisition. Pollack-Belz changed the call sign of the station to KWCE-LP in 2004.

When UPN and The WB ceased operations in 2006, KWCE opted to become an affiliate of Retro TV, while The CW went to KBCA and MyNetworkTV affiliated with Fox affiliate WNTZ on a secondary basis. The station also moved to channel 27 to avoid interference with nearby Fox affiliate KARD of Monroe, which broadcasts digitally on channel 36 and whose signal reaches much of the Alexandria market. When KLAX upgraded to high definition in 2012, KWCE was moved to a subchannel of channel 31 and affiliated with MeTV.

Pollack/Belz Broadcasting agreed to sell KWCE-LP and KLAX-TV to Lost Coast Broadcasting, a subsidiary of Northwest Broadcasting, for $3.5 million on April 6, 2018. The sale was completed on August 31.

In February 2019, Reuters reported that Apollo Global Management had agreed to acquire the entirety of Brian Brady's television portfolio, which it intends to merge with Cox Media Group (which Apollo is acquiring at the same time) and stations spun off from Nexstar Media Group's purchase of Tribune Broadcasting, once the purchases are approved by the FCC. In March 2019 filings with the FCC, Apollo confirmed that its newly-formed broadcasting group, Terrier Media, would acquire Northwest Broadcasting, with Brian Brady holding an unspecified minority interest in Terrier. In June 2019, it was announced that Terrier Media would instead operate as Cox Media Group, as Apollo had reached a deal to also acquire Cox's radio and advertising businesses. The transaction was completed on December 17.
