= WBMS =

WBMS may refer to:

- Web Business Management System
- WBMS (AM), a radio station in Brockton, Massachusetts
- WBMS-CA, a television station in Jackson, Mississippi
- The original call sign of WILD (AM), a radio station in Boston, Massachusetts
- The former call sign of WZGM, a radio station in Black Mountain, North Carolina
- A German Bacchanalian fraternity, called Weinbruderschaft Mittelrhein-Siebengebirge (Rheinweinbruderschaft)
