= Fox 44 =

Fox 44 may refer to one of the following television stations in the United States affiliated with the Fox Broadcasting Company:

== Current ==
- KPTH in Sioux City, Iowa
- KWKT-TV in Waco, Texas
- WFFF-TV in Burlington, Vermont
- WGMB-TV in Baton Rouge, Louisiana
- WEVV-DT2 in Evansville, Indiana

== Former ==
- WTOG in St. Petersburg–Tampa, Florida (1986-1988)
