= Fox 40 =

Fox 40 may refer to:

== Current ==
- KTXL in Sacramento, California
- WDBD in Jackson, Mississippi
- WICZ-TV in Binghamton, New York

== Former ==
- WKNT (now WNKY) in Bowling Green, Kentucky (1992–2001)
