= WXMS-LP =

Television station in Jackson, Mississippi (1999–2013)

- Jackson, Mississippi; United States
- Channels: Analog: 27 (UHF)
- Branding: MeTV Jackson

Programming
- Affiliations: The WB (1999–2001); UPN (1999–2006; secondary until 2001); Independent (2006–2011); MeTV (2011–2013)

Ownership
- Owner: American Spirit Media; (WDBD License Subsidiary, LLC)
- Operator: Raycom Media
- Sister stations: WDBD, WLOO

History
- Founded: August 24, 1995
- First air date: December 13, 1999 (on cable); July 2, 2000 (over the air)
- Last air date: February 11, 2013
- Former call signs: W22CG (1999–2000); W27CH (2000)
- Former channel number: Analog: 22 (UHF, 1999–2000), 27 (UHF, 2000–2013)

Technical information
- Facility ID: 52079
- Class: TX
- ERP: 10.9 kW
- Transmitter coordinates: 32°16′53.0″N 90°17′41.0″W

WXMS-LP (channel 27) was a low-power television station in Jackson, Mississippi, United States, which was last affiliated with MeTV. It was owned by American Spirit Media as a sister station to Fox affiliate WDBD (channel 40), and operated by Raycom Media, then-owner of NBC affiliate WLBT (channel 3).

== History ==
WXMS launched on December 13, 1999, on cable as a primary affiliate of The WB and secondary affiliate of UPN. Previously, cable viewers were able to see WB programming via Chicago's WGN-TV, which had dropped WB programming from its national superstation feed two months earlier. WXMS launched a low power signal on channel 27 on July 2, 2000. On October 7, 2001, WXMS became a primary UPN affiliate after ceding its WB affiliation to sister station WDBD, which had defected from the Fox network.

On January 5, 2006, WXMS lost its UPN affiliation to WRBJ and became an independent station. WXMS simulcast with its sister station WBMS-CA.

WXMS was sold by Jackson Television to Roundtable Broadcasting in early 2010. Roundtable Broadcasting filed to sell WXMS and WDBD to American Spirit Media in July 2012. As part of the deal, the station's operations were taken over by Raycom Media, owner of WLBT, under a shared services agreement; American Spirit also acquired WBMS-CA from Vicksburg Broadcasting.

WXMS, which had only ever operated through a series of special temporary authority (STA) grants in lieu of a permanent license, left the air on February 11, 2013. In advance of the most recent STA's expiration on January 3, 2014, American Spirit Media on January 2 returned the station's construction permit to the Federal Communications Commission, which cancelled it the next day.
