= KBCA =

Television station in Alexandria, Louisiana

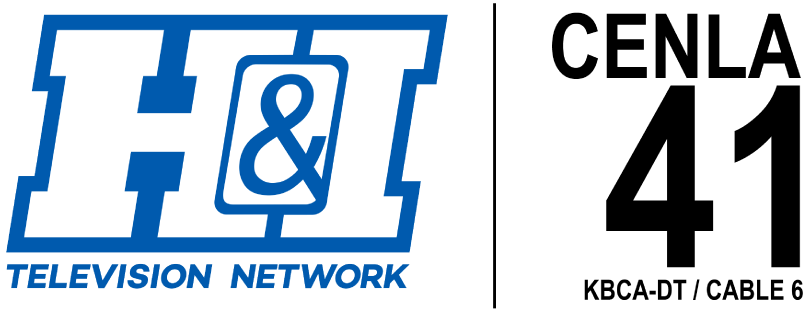

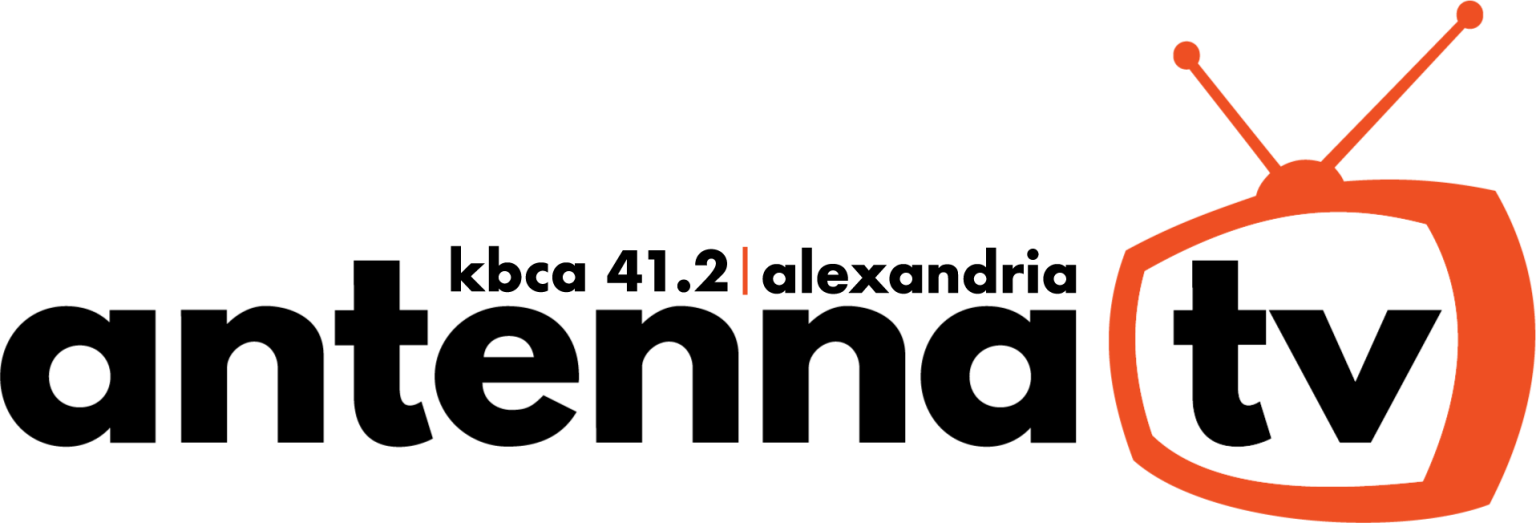
- Alexandria, Louisiana; United States
- Channels: Digital: 26 (UHF); Virtual: 41
- Branding: H&I 41 CenLa

Programming
- Affiliations: 41.1: Heroes & Icons; for others, see § Subchannels

Ownership
- Owner: Delta Media Corporation; (Wilderness Communications, LLC)

History
- First air date: June 1, 2005
- Former channel numbers: Analog: 41 (UHF, 2005–2009); Digital: 41 (UHF, 2009–2019)
- Former affiliations: The WB 100+ (2005–2006); CW+ (2006–2016)
- Call sign meaning: Blanchard, Chatelain, Azar (owners' initials)

Technical information
- Licensing authority: FCC
- Facility ID: 16940
- ERP: 1,000 kW
- HAAT: 301.8 m (990 ft)
- Transmitter coordinates: 30°54′17.4″N 92°37′28.9″W

Links
- Public license information: Public file; LMS

KBCA (channel 41) is a television station in Alexandria, Louisiana, United States, affiliated with the digital multicast network Heroes & Icons. The station is owned by Delta Media Corporation, and broadcasts from a transmitter in Oakdale, Louisiana.

== History ==
=== Early history ===
In early 2004, rumors had been spreading in the Alexandria market of a possible new television station to be launched. Local media insiders believed White Knight Broadcasting, then owners of Fox affiliate WNTZ (channel 48) was negotiating the purchase of the new channel with plans of moving the Fox affiliation to it. Eventually, upon petitioning the Federal Communications Commission (FCC) for the new channel, the plans were denied. The owners of White Knight eventually spoke to the previous of owners of WNTZ, Delta Media Corporation. Delta Media executives created a new corporate name, Dimension Broadcasting (a shell company for Wilderness Communications, LLC, another shell broadcasting company Delta Media owned and operated), and petitioned the FCC for the new license and won, becoming Dimension's charter station.

KBCA first signed on the air on June 1, 2005, as an affiliate of The WB. At the time of KBCA's sign-on, The WB had a group of cable-only stations in markets below the top 99 television media markets in the United States, called The WB 100+ Station Group. Since The WB 100+ was created before digital television was easily available in the United States, most WB 100+ stations were only available on cable, with a few over-the-air broadcast stations. Prior to KBCA's sign-on, The WB was only available to local cable subscribers. During this time, the "WB station" in Alexandria was identified by two different station call letters. It was known as "KAXN" channel 65.

White Knight Broadcasting was instrumental in assisting Dimension Broadcasting establish a relationship with the WB 100+ Station Group for the new KBCA, since White Knight also had previously owned the LMA to the Alexandria WB 100+ cable-only affiliate, KAXN. Furthermore, the Dimension/Wilderness and White Knight relationship helped the owners of Dimension/Wilderness eventually purchase two more stations, KLWB in Lafayette, Louisiana, and KCEB in Tyler, Texas. Both of these stations became WB affiliates (under the WB 100+ Station Group). In turn, the Dimension Broadcasting ownership allowed White Knight to operate KBCA under a LMA, managed by the staff of WNTZ. The headquarters and master control operation for KBCA (and later KLWB) eventually were established in Carencro, Louisiana, in space once occupied by a restaurant owned by Delta Media that houses that company's television and radio properties. KBCA established its local base of operation within offices Delta Media own along Alexandria's Jackson Street, which at the time were being rented by White Knight for WNTZ's base of operation.

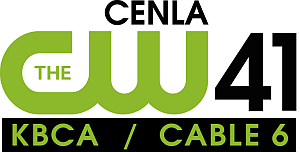
Logo during CW affiliation.

On January 24, 2006, the Warner Bros. Television unit of Time Warner and CBS Corporation announced they would merge The WB and UPN into a new singular network, The CW. In turn, Fox owner News Corporation announced the creation of MyNetworkTV for those stations left out in the cold due to the merger. KBCA, which held the WB affiliation a mere six months prior to the announced merger, was a perfect match and was announced as the Alexandria affiliate of The CW, which commenced operations on September 18, 2006.

After the CW affiliation announcement by KBCA, KBCA's former elder sister station, Fox affiliate WNTZ, was announced as MyNetworkTV's home under a secondary affiliation agreement. Former UPN station KWCE-LP became an affiliate of the Retro Television Network, and subsequently moved to channel 27 on the television dial.

Due to the bankruptcy of White Knight Broadcasting and its sister company Communications Corporation of America, both based in Lafayette, it was forced to dissolve its LMA with Dimension Broadcasting by the middle of 2006. However, operations of both KBCA and WNTZ remained in the Jackson Street offices, even though each station was operating separately as two companies occupying the office space. WNTZ eventually left the rented office space in the building by 2007 and moved, leaving KBCA alone on its own property. The owners eventually moved the entire operation of KBCA to its headquarters in Carencro shortly thereafter, leaving no base of operation for KBCA in Alexandria at all.

=== Loss of CW affiliation ===
On December 15, 2015, Gray Television, which owns KALB-TV (channel 5), came to terms on an extension of their existing CW affiliations; the press release announcing the extension also revealed Gray agreed to a new affiliation agreement with The CW for the Alexandria market, placing the network on a new third digital subchannel of KALB-TV in the fall of 2016, meaning KBCA lost their network affiliation at that time. KBCA substituted programming on their main channel with a simulcast of their subchannel running Heroes & Icons, taking the 3rd subchannel dark (which now is occupied by Start TV). Similar to Delta Media's Lafayette H&I affiliate KDCG-CD, KBCA preempts some H&I programming, particularly in the mornings, to broadcast infomercials.

== Technical information ==
=== Subchannels ===
The station's digital signal is multiplexed:

Subchannels of KBCA
Channel	Res.	Short name	Programming
41.1	480i	KBCA DT	Heroes & Icons
41.2	480i	KBCAATV	Antenna TV
41.3	480i	StartTV	Start TV
41.4	480i	COZI TV	Cozi TV
41.5	480i	StoryTV	Story Television

On August 1, 2012, KBCA added Antenna TV to channel 41.2, and Start TV on 41.3 May 7, 2021 with H&I moving to 41.1 after the CW went to KALB-DT3. Story Television (Weigel's newest network) launched on 41.5 February 22, 2023.

On January 31, 2013, it began broadcasting in HD.

On January 13, 2017, KBCA was no longer carried Antenna TV, leaving H&I 41.1 and Simulcast of KSLO-FM 41.4; however, during November 2019, Antenna TV returned to channel 41.2. When KBCA moved its physical channel from 41 to 26 in late 2019, it dropped its audio simulcast of KSLO-FM.

=== Analog-to-digital conversion ===
Because it was granted an original construction permit after the FCC finalized the DTV allotment plan on April 21, 1997 , the station did not receive a companion channel for a digital television station. Instead, on or before June 12, 2009, which is the end of the digital TV conversion period for full-service stations, KBCA was required to turn off its analog signal and turn on its digital signal (called a "flash-cut").
