= Woodie Assaf =

US weather announcer

- Woodie Assaf in 1992
- Born: Woodrow Assaf; March 15, 1917; McComb, Mississippi, U.S.
- Died: November 13, 2009 (aged 92); Raymond, Mississippi, U.S.
- Occupation: Weatherman
- Years active: 1937–2001
- Employer: WLBT (1953–2001)
- Spouse: Ruby Nickey (m. 1943–2009)
- Children: 2

Woodrow Assaf (March 15, 1917 − November 13, 2009) was an American weatherman who worked for many years in Jackson, Mississippi. He worked at WLBT, the NBC television network affiliate in Jackson, from 1953 to 2001, and after his retirement he was reported to be the weatherman with the second longest tenure at the same station in U.S. broadcasting history. Only Dick Goddard surpassed Assaf at 55 years, with the last 50 at WJW in Cleveland, Ohio.

== Early years ==
Woodie Assaf was born to Lebanese immigrants Ellis and Esma Assaf in McComb, Mississippi on March 15, 1917. He graduated from McComb High School, and then attended Southwest Mississippi Junior College and Louisiana State University. He served as an Army training officer during World War II. He first worked in radio in WSKB in McComb in 1937. After this he worked for radio stations in Vicksburg and Jackson.

== Tenure at WLBT ==
Assaf started working for WLBT television in Jackson in 1953, on the first day it went on the air (December 20, 1953). In the beginning he did a variety of jobs at the station, including recording commercials, selling advertising, and reporting news, sports and weather. Eventually he became the “weather man,” giving weather reports on the station. (He was not a meteorologist and did not claim to be. He qualified all his weather reports with the line "The weatherman says...") He became a well-known and iconic figure in Mississippi throughout his time at WLBT, also due to his efforts in fundraising and community activities. He annually hosted the Easter Seals Telethon. In 1969 he hosted a benefit starring Bob Hope that raised over $2.5 million for victims of Hurricane Camille. He emceed numerous beauty pageants and special events throughout the state. In 1996 he carried the Olympic torch, representing WLBT-TV.

In 1999, a Clarion-Ledger readers' poll voted him Mississippi's most popular TV personality of the millennium.

== Personal life and death ==
He was married to Ruby Assaf (née Nickey) from 1943 until her death in 2009. They were married for 65 years. They had two daughters. Woodie Assaf died of natural causes at Riggs Manor Retirement Center in Raymond, Mississippi, on November 13, 2009.
