= KLAX =

KLAX may refer to:

- KLAX-FM, a radio station (97.9 FM) licensed to East Los Angeles, California
- KLAX-TV, a television station (channel 31) licensed to Alexandria, Louisiana
- Klax (video game), a 1990 puzzle video game
- The ICAO airport code for Los Angeles International Airport
