= WVLA-TV =

Television station in Baton Rouge, Louisiana

- Baton Rouge, Louisiana; United States
- Channels: Digital: 34 (UHF); Virtual: 33
- Branding: NBC Local 33; Louisiana First News

Programming
- Affiliations: 33.1: NBC; for others, see § Subchannels

Ownership
- Owner: White Knight Broadcasting; (Knight Broadcasting of Baton Rouge License Corporation)
- Operator: Nexstar Media Group
- Sister stations: WGMB-TV, WBRL-CD, KZUP-CD

History
- First air date: October 16, 1971
- Former call signs: WRBT (1971–1987); WVLA (1987–2009)
- Former channel numbers: Analog: 33 (UHF, 1971–2009)
- Former affiliations: ABC (1971–1977); Fox (secondary, 1990–1991)
- Call sign meaning: Vetter Louisiana (previous owner); -or-; "A New Vision for Louisiana" (former slogan)

Technical information
- Licensing authority: FCC
- Facility ID: 70021
- ERP: 1,000 kW
- HAAT: 522 m (1,713 ft)
- Transmitter coordinates: 30°19′34.6″N 91°16′36.1″W

Links
- Public license information: Public file; LMS
- Website: www.louisianafirstnews.com

WVLA-TV (channel 33) is a television station in Baton Rouge, Louisiana, United States, affiliated with NBC. It is owned by White Knight Broadcasting and operated by Nexstar Media Group alongside Fox affiliate WGMB-TV (channel 44), CW outlet WBRL-CD (channel 21), and independent station KZUP-CD (channel 19). The four stations share studios on Perkins Road in Baton Rouge; WVLA-TV's transmitter is located near Addis, Louisiana.

== History ==
The station first signed on the air on October 16, 1971, as WRBT, an ABC affiliate. The station was founded by Romac Baton Rouge Corporation, a consortium of Southern Educators Life Insurance Company and local businessmen Richard O. Rush and Ramon V. Jarrell, with its call letters standing for "Romac Broadcasting Television". The station temporarily operated from Florida Boulevard before moving to studios on Essen Lane, where it stayed until 2000. Before WRBT began, ABC was limited to off-hours clearances on then-NBC affiliate WBRZ-TV (channel 2) and CBS affiliate WAFB-TV (channel 9).

On paper, Baton Rouge had been large enough to support three full network affiliates since at least the 1950s. However, the Federal Communications Commission (FCC) only assigned two VHF allocations to Baton Rouge, channels 2 and 9–occupied by WBRZ and WAFB. With Baton Rouge sandwiched between New Orleans to the east, Lafayette to the west, and south, Jackson to the north, and Alexandria to the north, it is not likely there would have been enough room to drop in a third VHF allocation for Baton Rouge. There was an effort to move the transmitter of proposed Houma television station KHMA to the Greater Baton Rouge area in 1964 to serve as the city's ABC affiliate, with that management of that station going as far as to establish an advertising office in Baton Rouge; however, the owners of WAFB and WBRZ successfully petitioned the FCC to block the transfer, citing the urge of UHF development in the area. The FCC did not mandate all-channel tuning until 1964. Before then, UHF stations were only viewable with an expensive converter, and picture quality was marginal at best even with one. By the late 1960s, however, all-channel sets had gained enough penetration to make a commercial UHF station in Baton Rouge viable.

WRBT originally broadcast from 10:30 a.m. until midnight on Mondays through Fridays; 7 a.m. until midnight on Saturdays; and 9 a.m. until midnight on Sundays.

In March 1976, Rush Broadcasting Corporation, owned by Jules B. LeBlanc and Cyril Vetter, purchased the station. In the late 1970s, ABC became the most-watched network and was seeking out stronger stations, while NBC fell to third and last place in ratings. While WRBT was still trying to find its feet, WBRZ was the top-rated station in Baton Rouge. WBRZ approached ABC for an affiliation, and ABC readily accepted. More or less by default, WRBT joined NBC. WRBT swapped affiliations with WBRZ on September 5, 1977, and became an NBC affiliate with NBC Nightly News as its first aired program. In 1979, Vetter purchased LeBlanc's stake to become sole owner. In 1980, Vetter considered selling the station to United Television when it was partially owned by 20th Century Fox, but when BHC/Chris-Craft traded its interest in 20th Century Fox to Marvin Davis and Marc Rich for a 19% interest in United, the sale fell through.

On May 2, 1986, WRBT was the first local station in Baton Rouge and the first NBC affiliate in Louisiana to broadcast in stereo, after WYES and WNOL in New Orleans and KMSS-TV in Shreveport. It changed its calls to WVLA on November 26, 1987, after building a higher and more powerful tower that boosted its signal to a full five million watts. From April 1990 until February 1991, the station took a secondary affiliation with Fox by airing week-delayed episodes of The Simpsons, In Living Color, and Married... with Children.

Vetter owned the station until 1996, when he sold it to Lafayette-based White Knight Broadcasting, owned by Sheldon Galloway. This move created a partnership, as Communications Corporation of America, a company controlled by Galloway's father, Thomas, owned Fox affiliate WGMB-TV. Around this time, WVLA began branding itself as "NBC 33", which, with the exception of a brief period in the early 2000s, would remain the station's branding until 2015. Since then, WGMB, WVLA, WBRL-CD, and KZUP-CD have shared the same studios, moving to its current studios on Perkins Road in 1999.

On April 24, 2013, ComCorp announced the sale of its entire group to Nexstar Broadcasting Group. WVLA and KZUP were to be sold to Mission Broadcasting, but on August 13, 2014, Mission withdrew its application. The sale was completed on January 1, 2015. Nexstar would continue to operate WVLA and KZUP under a shared services agreement, with sister stations WGMB and WBRL.

On July 1, 2015, then-sister stations KADN and KLAF-LD launched NBC on 15.2 and 46.1 with a partial simulcast of WVLA. Cox Communications dropped WVLA from its Lafayette regional lineup and replaced it with KLAF as WVLA programming aired on the channel until January 2016. In June 2015, Nexstar relaunched WVLA and WGMB's website under one banner, www.brproud.com, and in September 2015, Nexstar upgraded the station's news set, hired additional talent, and began broadcasting newscasts in high definition. When the upgrades were completed, the station rebranded itself as Local 33. In October 2016, WVLA celebrated their 45th anniversary of its original airdate.

== Programming ==
In mid-September 1983, the station received national attention when it pulled Late Night with David Letterman and replaced it with All in the Family reruns due to poor ratings. After 3,500 LSU students presented Vetter with a petition to bring the show back to Baton Rouge, Vetter told them he would only reinstate Letterman if every student maintained at least a C average for the fall semester. Other Baton Rougeans, including then-Secretary of State Jim Brown, lobbied WRBT to keep Letterman on the air, and this compelled Vetter to reinstate the program by late September. Eventually, many residents of New Orleans tuned to WRBT to watch Letterman when NBC affiliate WDSU preempted the show in favor of Thicke of the Night. Cox Cable also provided WRBT's feed of Late Night as an interim solution for their subscribers. In 1992, WVLA canceled Letterman for a second time, again citing poor ratings, and replaced it with Rush Limbaugh's talk show. The station, however, aired Late Night with Conan O'Brien when it premiered the next year.

=== News operation ===
WVLA used to air nightly 6 and 10 p.m. newscasts during the 1980s. In 1987, the 6 p.m. newscast moved to 5 p.m.; however, both newscasts were canceled in 1989, citing poor ratings, with reruns of off-network sitcoms airing in their place. Vetter supported this move with a desire to make channel 33 a complete entertainment station, taking into account the station's poor prime time news ratings against WAFB and WBRZ. Nonetheless, this proved successful ratings-wise, as the station's share jumped from 3 percent to 7 percent after the move. Later that year, it premiered a morning news program called Morning Edition that aired before The Today Show, originally lasting a half-hour before expanding a full hour; this newscast was canceled in January 2005 in favor of airing NBC's early morning newscast Early Today in the slot. In the early 1990s, the station had an information hotline service for viewers to call to get news updates.

The station's latest generation of newscasts debuted on January 8, 2007, with weeknight shows at 5 p.m. and 10 p.m. The 6 p.m. shows began airing on January 29, 2007. On August 27, 2007, WVLA launched a 30-minute newscast titled NBC 33 News Morning Edition, airing weekdays at 6 a.m. On August 11, 2008 NBC 33 News Morning Edition began airing for one hour, and later became a two-hour broadcast.

WVLA began airing weekend editions of its newscasts on September 13, 2008; the weekend newscasts were produced by sister station KETK-TV in Tyler, Texas. This has led to several errors when the show ultimately aired in Baton Rouge, including on November 16, 2008, when an entire newscast from the previous Sunday was shown. On September 22, 2008, WVLA changed the format for its 10 p.m. weekday newscast with the Ten at 10; it promised all the important local news and a full weather forecast in the first ten minutes.

On April 28, 2009, most of the news staff was let go, including the main anchors, and WVLA announced that the 5 and 10 p.m. weekday newscasts would originate from KETK; however, the station's weekday morning newscast NBC 33 News Morning Edition still originated from Baton Rouge.

In April 2010, BP Oil's Deepwater Horizon Rig exploded, then sank; oil began leaking from a well and was threatening coastal Louisiana. WVLA began once again producing local newscasts entitled Crisis on the Coast, although the sportscast was still anchored from Tyler, Texas.

On July 5, 2010, WVLA began broadcasting their newscasts in 16:9 standard-definition widescreen. In August 2011, WVLA expanded its weekday morning newscast, now running from 5 to 7 a.m., then less than a month later on September 12, WVLA launched a half-hour weeknight newscast at 6:30 p.m.

WVLA-TV's newscasts began to be simulcast on Lafayette sister station KLAF-LD when that station joined NBC on July 1, 2015; the arrangement lasted until KLAF launched its own newscasts on April 1, 2016.

On September 8, 2015, on-air personality Derek Myers was fired from WVLA-TV after asking senator David Vitter, who was running for governor, about an allegation that he had frequented prostitutes. After Myers asked the question, Vitter's campaign pulled hundreds-of-thousands of dollars in advertising from the station in an attempt to silence the story. Vitter admitted to the prostitution allegations as part of the "DC Madam" scandal, and the scandal became a game-changer in the race for the Governor's mansion. The senator went on to lose the run-off election by more than 12%, with the history of prostitution allegations being cited as the main reason for his downfall.

On September 21, 2015, WVLA changed its branding to Local 33 News, matching the trend of several of its sister stations. The station also debuted a new set, graphics, and began broadcasting news in high definition and moved its 6:30 p.m. newscast back to 6 p.m.

On January 10, 2025, WVLA and WGMB debuted new graphics and news music, uniting all the newscasts produced by the two stations under the title Louisiana First News.

=== Notable former on-air staff ===
- Isiah Carey – reporter
- Fred Hickman – anchor

== Technical information ==
=== Subchannels ===
The station's signal is multiplexed:

Subchannels of WVLA-TV
Subchannel	Res.	Short name	Programming
33.1	1080i	WVLA-TV	NBC
33.2	480i	Laff	Laff
33.3	480i	Ion	Ion
33.4	480i	Ant TV	Antenna TV (4:3)

WVLA had carried NBC Weather Plus as channel 33.2, a digital subchannel, before that network ceased national operation on December 1, 2008. From 2008 until September 2012, the subchannel carried This TV before WVLA lost the affiliation to WBTR, a sister station to rival WBRZ. Channel 33.2 then began airing weather forecasts and rebroadcasts of NBC 33 News under the title NBC 33 Always On, before going off the air in January 2015, shortly after Nexstar management took over. The subchannel remained dark until late August 2016 when it was reactivated to carry programming from Laff due to an extensive deal between Nexstar and Katz Broadcasting to carry its diginets. On October 28, 2017, WVLA added Ion Television to its third channel, bringing the network over the air in Baton Rouge for the first time since 2002. On March 1, 2023, WVLA added Antenna TV to a channel 33.4, approximately 1 1/2 months after original affiliate WLFT-CD discontinued broadcasting it upon being purchased by Family Worship Center.

=== Analog-to-digital conversion ===
WVLA-TV shut down its analog signal, over UHF channel 33, on June 12, 2009, the official date on which full-power television stations in the United States transitioned from analog to digital broadcasts under federal mandate. The station's digital signal remained on its pre-transition UHF channel 34, using virtual channel 33.
