= KPBN-LD =

Television station in Baton Rouge, Louisiana

- Baton Rouge, Louisiana; United States
- Channels: Digital: 14 (UHF); Virtual: 14
- Branding: The Pelican

Programming
- Affiliations: 14.1: SonLife; 14.2: Independent; for others, see § Subchannels

Ownership
- Owner: Pelican Broadcasting Network, L.L.C.

History
- First air date: 1988 (as a translator of WBTR); 1994 (first incarnation); January 12, 2002 (second and current incarnation)
- Last air date: December 27, 2000 (first incarnation)
- Former call signs: K07UJ (1988-1994); WTVK-LP (1994–1999); KTTE-LP (1999–2002)
- Former affiliations: Independent (1994–1995, 1999–2000); The WB (1995–1999); Dark (2000–2002); America One (2002–2015); Untamed Sports TV (2008–2017)
- Call sign meaning: Pelican Broadcasting Network

Technical information
- Licensing authority: FCC
- Facility ID: 167737
- Class: LD
- ERP: 15 kW
- HAAT: 54.3 m (178 ft)
- Transmitter coordinates: 30°27′0.6″N 91°7′59.3″W

Links
- Public license information: LMS

KPBN-LD (channel 14) is a low-power television station in Baton Rouge, Louisiana, United States. The station is owned by Pelican Broadcasting.

KPBN's main programming feed is carried on the station's second digital subchannel, which is affiliated with the Pursuit Channel when local programs are not airing. Its first subchannel airs Jimmy Swaggart's SonLife Broadcasting Network as that network's co-flagship station.

== History ==
KPBN started as K07UJ, a translator station for the Woody Jenkins-owned WBTR. The station soon changed to channel 11 and was an independent station known as WTVK-LP in 1994, owned by Gulf Atlantic Communications. In 1995, WTVK served as Baton Rouge's first WB affiliate with a secondary affiliation with America One, yet the station failed to secure a spot on Baton Rouge's cable lineup and had a broadcast range of only six miles (9.7 km). Only cable systems in Clinton, Jackson, Watson and at LSU carried the station.

By 1999, WBBR (now WBRL) signed on as a cable-only station, taking the WB affiliation, and channel 11 changed its call letters to KTTE, serving as an independent station on March 31 of that year that focused on local and sports programming. At this time, KTTE secured a spot on TCI's cable lineup; however, the station struggled to stay on the air, as the owners faced eviction in August 2000. After returning to the air for a brief period of time, the station signed off for good on December 27, 2000, after a conflict emerged between the station's owner, Dave Loflin of Gulf Atlantic, and station manager Upfront Partnership, owned by Tony Perkins and Bob Courtney. On January 12, 2002, KPBN-LP signed on channel 11, carrying a sports-centered programming lineup with some America One programming. The station chose not to renew its America One affiliation once the network merged with YouToo TV.

In 2017, KPBN dropped its Untamed Sports TV affiliation and now only broadcast programming from The Pursuit Channel outside of local programming. That same year, the station became Jimmy Swaggart's Sonlife TV network flagship station with sports programming moving to the second subchannel. Pelican Sports was added to KPBN's second subchannel, and Light TV was added to the fourth subchannel on January 1, 2018.

== Subchannels ==
The station's signal is multiplexed:

Subchannels of KPBN-LD
Channel	Res.	Short name	Programming
14.1	480i	SBN	SonLife (4:3)
14.2	480i	KPBN	Independent (4:3)
14.3	480i	DEC	Catchy Comedy (4:3)
14.4	480i	LTV	[Blank] (4:3)
14.5	480i	MOV	Movies! (4:3)
