= KHMA =

Television station in Houma, Louisiana (1972–1973)

KHMA-TV
- Houma, Louisiana; United States
- Channels: Analog: 11 (VHF)

Programming
- Affiliations: Independent

Ownership
- Owner: Denver T. Brannen; (St. Anthony Television Corporation)

History
- First air date: March 1, 1972
- Last air date: October 15, 1973; (1 year, 228 days)
- Call sign meaning: Houma

Technical information
- ERP: 257 kW
- HAAT: 143.2 m (470 ft)

KHMA-TV (channel 11) was an independent television station in Houma, Louisiana, United States, which served the south Louisiana community.

== History ==
The Federal Communications Commission (FCC) licensed channel 11 to St. Anthony TV Corporation in 1958, and the station was intended to be an ABC affiliate. In 1964, St. Anthony TV Corp. petitioned to move the station's transmitter to a point north of Houma near Geismar, Louisiana so that the station could also serve Baton Rouge (which did not have a primary ABC affiliate at the time). After the FCC granted permission to move the tower on the condition it did not interfere with WTOK of Meridian, both Louisiana Television Broadcasting Corporation (owner of Baton Rouge's then-NBC affiliate WBRZ, now Baton Rouge's ABC affiliate) and Guaranty Broadcasting Corporation (owner of Baton Rouge's CBS affiliate WAFB) filed an appeal to block the transfer. In 1965, the District Court of Appeals ruled in favor of the two Baton Rouge stations, blocking the FCC's grant.

On March 1, 1972, at 11:30 a.m., the station signed on as an independent station serving the tri-city area of Morgan City (although part of the Lafayette DMA), Thibodaux, and Houma and the ten-parish area south of Baton Rouge and New Orleans. The first program the station aired was The Phyllis Diller Show. During weekdays, KHMA signed on at 11:30 a.m. and signed off at 12:30 a.m., and, on weekends, it signed on at 8:00 a.m. and signed off at 12:30 a.m. The station suffered financial trouble, and the FCC authorized the station to go dark on October 15, 1973, and St. Anthony TV Corp. declared bankruptcy. In August 1974, the buildings and land that formerly housed the station had been sold to Denver T. Brannen and delivered the equipement to launch WDTB (now WMBB) in Panama City, Florida, which served as that region's NBC affiliate and is now the ABC affiliate. The license was deleted at the request of the licensee on November 12, 1974.

In the mid-1980s, New Dawn Broadcasting was issued a permit to establish a new TV station in Houma on channel 11, KNHH, but due to technical trouble, the FCC denied their request for an extension. Today, PBS member station WYES-TV in New Orleans uses the digital channel 12, and Martin Folse established KFOL-CD (HTV Channel 10) to serve the Houma area.

== Programming ==
Among the locally produced programs included a local news show (The Tri-City Report) twice a day, at 5:30 and 10 p.m., sports (The Tri-City Accent), and a third show hosted by local farm authority George W. Shannon, as well as a program by local musician L. J. Foret. KHMA primarily aired old movies and syndicated reruns, including The Phyllis Diller Show, Peyton Place, The Movie Game, The Munsters, Petticoat Junction, Hogan's Heroes, Dragnet, The Virginian, Lassie, America Sings, Time Tunnel, The Wild Wild West, The Name of the Game, The Andy Griffith Show, Happy and His Friends, Land of the Giants, Galloping Gourmet, Lost in Space, and Engelbert Humperdinck. The station also broadcast movies under the following monikers: Cinema 11, Western Theatre, Adventure Theatre, Nightmare Theatre, The Late Movie, and Afternoon Theatre.
