= Communications Corporation of America =

American media company

- Company type: Private (subsidiary of Silver Point Capital)
- Industry: Telecommunications
- Founded: 1989
- Founder: Thomas R. Galloway; D. Wayne Elmore
- Defunct: January 1, 2015 (10 years ago)
- Fate: Acquired by Nexstar
- Successor: Nexstar Broadcasting Group
- Headquarters: Lafayette, Louisiana, U.S.
- Key people: Thomas R. Galloway, CEO
- Services: Television stations
- Owner: Thomas R. Galloway; D. Wayne Elmore
- Number of employees: 345

Communications Corporation of America (also known as ComCorp) was a broadcasting company in the United States that owned television stations in smaller markets. The company was headquartered in Lafayette, Louisiana. It owned and/or operated 20 stations (counting satellite stations and those controlled via local marketing agreements). The company began in 1989 and the next year, it purchased three television stations from Southwest MultiMedia Company of Houston: KVEO in Brownsville, KPEJ in Odessa, and KWKT in Waco using the holding company Associated Broadcasters. They also purchased the license for WPFT in Baton Rouge, LA, which they signed on in 1991 as WGMB with the holding Galloway Media.

At one point, ComCorp was also an owner of radio stations in its home market of Lafayette; it subsequently sold those stations to Regent Communications.

In June 2006, ComCorp filed for Chapter 11 bankruptcy. The company emerged from bankruptcy in October 2007 under the control of Silver Point Capital, who also controlled Granite Broadcasting.

Local news on ComCorp's owned or managed stations are structured variably, with most stations not producing news in-house. As of May 2011, the only ComCorp owned-and-operated stations with in-house local newscasts are KTSM-TV and KETK-TV; two ComCorp managed stations, WVLA-TV and KDBC-TV also produce their own newscasts. Most of the remainder of the company's stations have their newscasts outsourced to other stations in the company portfolio: most of ComCorp's Fox stations in Louisiana and Texas have local newscasts produced by KETK (with the exception of WGMB in Baton Rouge, whose newscasts are produced out of area sister station WVLA); the newscasts for NBC affiliate KVEO-TV in Brownsville, Texas, though are produced by El Paso CBS affiliate KDBC-TV); the remainder of ComCorp's owned and managed stations, including CBS affiliate WEVV-TV (the only Big Three station in the group without any local news), do not carry news at all.

On January 15, 2013, Communications Corporation of America put all of its 25 owned or managed stations up for sale, with investment firm Houlihan Lokey hired to assist in the exploration of sale options. On April 24, ComCorp announced that its entire group would be sold to Nexstar Broadcasting Group; KMSS-TV, KPEJ-TV and most of the ComCorp-managed stations that are owned by White Knight Broadcasting would be sold to Mission Broadcasting while WEVV-TV and White Knight Broadcasting's KSHV-TV would be sold to a female-controlled company called Rocky Creek Communications, with Nexstar assuming operational control of those stations. However, on June 6, 2014, Nexstar announced that it would instead sell KMSS & KPEJ to a new minority-owned company Marshall Broadcasting Group (marking the company's first television station acquisitions) for $58.5 million. Also on August 4, Nexstar announced that it would instead sell WEVV to Bayou City Broadcasting for $18.6 million. Mission & Rocky Creek would later withdraw its applications to acquire KFXK, KSHV & WVLA. The sale was completed on January 1, 2015.

It was the last remaining TV station group that didn't have an ABC affiliate when sold; however, it had temporarily owned and operated current-Fox affiliate WHBQ-TV of Memphis during its last days as an ABC affiliate and managed KAQY in Monroe, Louisiana during its first nine years as an ABC affiliate.

== Former stations ==
- Stations are arranged in alphabetical order by state and city of license.
- Two boldface asterisks appearing following a station's call letters (**) indicate a station built and signed on by Communications Corporation of America.

Stations owned by Communications Corporation of America
Media market	State	Station	Purchased	Sold	Notes
Evansville	Indiana	WTSN-CD	1999	2009	(Note: Owned by a third party and operated by ComCorp.)
Evansville	Indiana	WEVV-TV	1999	2015	
Evansville	Indiana	WEEV-LD	2011	2015	
Alexandria	Louisiana	WNTZ-TV	1997	2015	
Baton Rouge	Louisiana	WGMB-TV**	1991	2015	
Baton Rouge	Louisiana	WBRL-CD	2002	2015	
Baton Rouge	Louisiana	WVLA-TV	1996	2015	
Baton Rouge	Louisiana	KZUP-CD	2002	2015	
Lafayette	Louisiana	KADN-TV	1997	2015	
Lafayette	Louisiana	KFTE	1996	2001	
Lafayette	Louisiana	KLAF-LD	1997	2015	
Lafayette	Louisiana	KMDL	1996	2001	
Lafayette	Louisiana	KROF	1999	2001	
Lafayette	Louisiana	KPEL	1989	2001	
Lafayette	Louisiana	KRKA	1997	2001	(Note: Known as KPEL-FM prior to 1998 and as KRKZ from 1998 to 2000.)
Lafayette	Louisiana	KTDY	1989	2001	
Shreveport	Louisiana	KMSS-TV	1994	2015	
Shreveport	Louisiana	KSHV-TV	1995	2015	
Memphis	Tennessee	WHBQ-TV	1994	1995	
Austin	Texas	KAKW	1996	2002	
Brownsville–Harlingen–McAllen	Texas	KVEO-TV	1990	2015	
Bryan–College Station	Texas	KYLE-TV	1996	2015	(Note: Satellite of KWKT-TV.)
El Paso	Texas	KTSM	1997	1998	
El Paso	Texas	KTSM-FM	1997	1998	
El Paso	Texas	KTSM-TV	1997	2015	
El Paso	Texas	KDBC-TV	2009	2015	
Odessa–Midland	Texas	KPEJ-TV	1990	2015	
Tyler–Longview–Nacogdoches	Texas	KETK-LP	2004	2011	(Note: Satellite of KETK-TV.)
Tyler–Longview–Nacogdoches	Texas	KETK-TV	2004	2015	
Tyler–Longview–Nacogdoches	Texas	KFXL-LP	1998	2015	(Note: Satellite of KFXK-TV.)
Tyler–Longview–Nacogdoches	Texas	KFXK-TV	1998	2015	
Waco–Temple	Texas	KWKT-TV	1990	2015	
