= American Spirit Media =

American broadcasting company

American Spirit Media, LLC
- Formerly: Ottumwa Media Holdings, LLC
- Type: Private
- Industry: Broadcast media
- Founded: 2003; 23 years ago
- Headquarters: Charlotte, North Carolina, United States
- Owner: Thomas B. Henson
- Website: americanspiritmedia.tv

American Spirit Media, LLC is a broadcasting company based in Charlotte, North Carolina. Founded by Thomas B. Henson in 2003 as Ottumwa Media Holdings, it owns television stations in several cities in the Southeastern United States.

Almost all of American Spirit Media's stations were operated by Gray Media (dating back to its corporate predecessor Raycom Media) under shared services agreements.

== History ==
In 2003, Raycom Media acquired the Waitt Media stations (that included KYOU-TV in the Ottumwa, Iowa DMA). As Raycom already owned KTVO (licensed in Kirksville, Missouri, on the same DMA), and it could not legally keep both stations because the market has too few channels to legally permit a duopoly, KYOU was sold to then named Ottumwa Media Holdings (created in that year) for $4 million. The company entered into a shared services agreement and studio lease agreement with Raycom to operate KYOU, and Raycom would have an option to purchase KYOU.

In August 2006, Ottumwa Media Holdings changed its name to American Spirit Media. On the same month, on August 11, KTVO was sold to Barrington Broadcasting as part of a $262 million deal for twelve stations, however, Raycom retained its shared services agreement with KYOU.

In 2011, Community Newspaper Holdings sold Southeastern Media Holdings and its four stations to Thomas Henson (who later transferred in the same year his shares to American Spirit Media, which he owns) for $24 million and the assumption of $50 million in debt.

On January 11, 2012, it was reported that LIN Media would sell WUPW to American Spirit Media for $22 million. As part of the acquisition, WUPW entered into a shared services agreement with Raycom's WTOL. The acquisition was completed on April 20, 2012.

In July 2012, the company agreed to acquire WDBD and WXMS-LP from Roundtable Broadcasting. As part of the deal, the station's operations would be taken over by Raycom's WLBT. American Spirit also agreed to acquire WUFX and WBMS-CA from Vicksburg Broadcasting, but spin off the WUFX license to Tougaloo College for $1 (though it will operate that station under a joint sales agreement). Both transactions were consummated on November 13.

On November 27, 2013, American Spirit Media announced it would acquire KFVE and its satellites KGMV and KGMD-TV from MCG Capital Corporation. The stations were already operated by Raycom Media.

In August 2015, as a result of Raycom Media's purchase of Drewry Communications; Hoak Media sold Wichita Falls, Texas'-based KAUZ-TV to American Spirit Media. KSWO-TV (acquired by Raycom from Drewry) and KAUZ remained jointly operated, but the joint sales agreement between with KAUZ would be terminated upon the sale's closure due to FCC rules prohibiting such agreements by counting the sale of 15% or more of advertising time by one station to a competing junior partner station in the JSA as a duopoly in violation with the agency's ownership rules (the Wichita Falls-Lawton market has only four full-power television stations, four fewer than that allowed to legally form a duopoly); upon the JSA's termination, Raycom would enter into a shared services agreement with KAUZ, under which KSWO would handle news production, administrative and production operations, and equipment and building space for that station. The sale was completed on December 1.

On March 10, 2016, American Spirit Media acquired Lake Charles' KVHP for $2 million, after which it entered into a shared services agreement with Raycom's KPLC.

On June 25, 2018, Gray Television announced an agreement to merge with Raycom; in advance of the merger, Raycom exercised an option to acquire KYOU and WUPV in Richmond, Virginia outright. In advance of the merger, Raycom exercised its options to purchase both stations outright from American Spirit Media. The sale to Gray was approved on December 20 and completed on January 2, 2019. The SSA with WUPW transitioned to Tegna Inc., which acquired WTOL from Raycom due to Gray electing to keep its existing WTVG.

On July 1, 2026, Gray announced that it would acquire American Spirit Media outright for $50 million.

== Operations ==
The company owns or operates seven stations, of which all but one are operated by Gray Media through shared services and/or joint sales agreements.

=== Current ===
Media market	State	Station	Purchased	Affiliation	Notes
Columbus	Georgia	WXTX	2011	Fox	(Note: Operated by Gray Media.)
Lake Charles	Louisiana	KVHP	2016	Fox; ABC (DT2); Univision (DT4)	
Jackson, Mississippi	Mississippi	WDBD	2012	Fox	
Jackson, Mississippi	Mississippi	WLOO	—N/a	MyNetworkTV	(Note: Owned by Tougaloo College, American Spirit Media operates WLOO through a joint services agreement with certain services provided by Gray Media (SSA).)
Wilmington	North Carolina	WSFX-TV	2011	Fox	
Toledo	Ohio	WUPW	2012	Fox	(Note: Operated by Tegna Inc., a subsidiary of Nexstar Media Group.)
Wichita Falls	Texas	KAUZ-TV	2015	CBS	

=== Former ===
Media market	State	Station	Purchased	Sold	Notes
Augusta	Georgia	WFXG	2003	2011	
Ottumwa	Iowa	KYOU-TV	2003	2019	
Richmond	Virginia	WUPV	2011	2019	

== Carriage disputes ==
=== 2017–18 dispute with DirecTV and AT&T U-verse ===
Under U.S. federal law, cable and satellite providers may not carry over-the-air stations on their systems without the consent of each stations' signal owners. American Spirit Media failed to renew its retransmission contract with DirecTV/AT&T U-verse upon its expiration on August 31, 2017. After a three-week extension period passed with both parties failing to agree on a new contract, American Spirit Media withdrew permission for DirecTV/AT&T U-verse to retransmit the signals of its stations as of 11:59 p.m. EDT on September 21. The dispute lasted for four months before a resolution was reached on January 30, 2018.

== See also ==
- Cunningham Broadcasting
- Mission Broadcasting
