= WBRZ-TV =

Television station in Baton Rouge, Louisiana

- Baton Rouge, Louisiana; United States
- Channels: Digital: 13 (VHF); Virtual: 2
- Branding: WBRZ-TV 2, WBRZ News 2

Programming
- Affiliations: 2.1: ABC; 2.2: Independent

Ownership
- Owner: Manship family; (Louisiana Television Broadcasting, LLC)
- Sister stations: KBTR-CD

History
- First air date: April 14, 1955
- Former call signs: WBRZ (1955–1981)
- Former channel numbers: Analog: 2 (VHF, 1955–2009)
- Former affiliations: NBC (1955–1977); ABC (secondary, 1955–1971); PBS (per program, 1970–1975)
- Call sign meaning: Baton Rouge's "Z" (2)

Technical information
- Licensing authority: FCC
- Facility ID: 38616
- ERP: 45.9 kW
- HAAT: 525 m (1,722 ft)
- Transmitter coordinates: 30°17′49″N 91°11′37″W

Links
- Public license information: Public file; LMS
- Website: wbrz.com

WBRZ-TV (channel 2) is a television station in Baton Rouge, Louisiana, United States, affiliated with ABC. The station is owned by the Manship family, who formerly published the Baton Rouge daily newspaper, The Advocate, and is one of a handful of TV stations today to have locally based ownership. WBRZ-TV is sister to Class A independent station KBTR-CD (channel 36), and the two outlets share studios on Highland Road in Baton Rouge, just south of downtown. WBRZ-TV's transmitter is located in the Sunshine neighborhood of St. Gabriel, Louisiana.

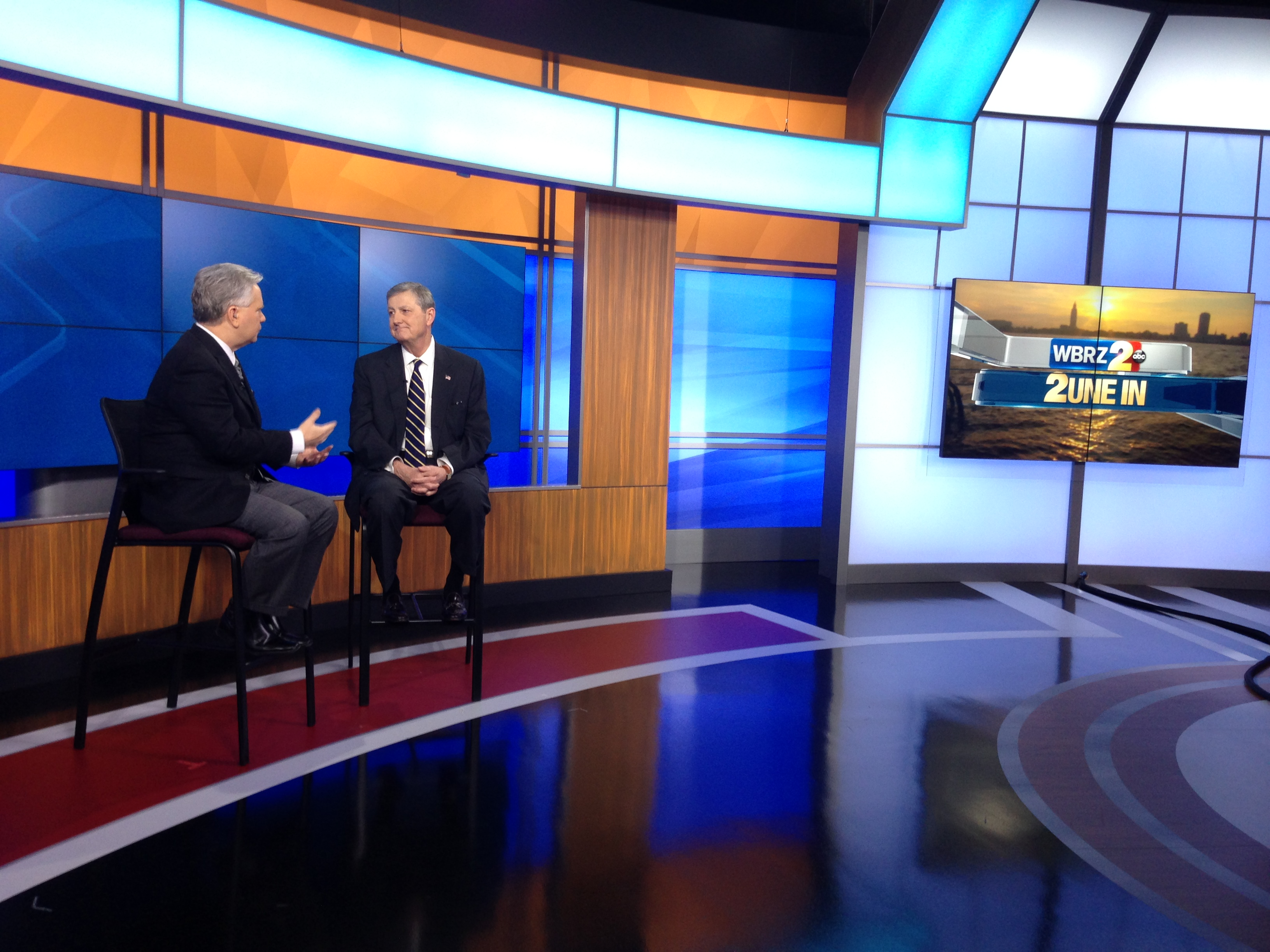
Then Louisiana State Treasurer John Neely Kennedy (right) in the WBRZ studio in 2015

== History ==
WBRZ signed on the air on April 14, 1955, becoming the second television station in Baton Rouge, signing on exactly two years after CBS affiliate WAFB. It was also the longest-running VHF outlet in Baton Rouge at the time, as WAFB originally broadcast on UHF channel 28 before moving to VHF channel 9 in 1960. WBRZ was a primary NBC affiliate, sharing ABC with WAFB. It began broadcasting in color seven months later, becoming the first Baton Rouge TV station to do so.

At first, the Manships wanted to call the station WBRA-TV, for the Baton Rouge Advocate, but went with the reverse "Z" at the end instead, avoiding the implications of having calls which could be understood to also mean the women's undergarment. Station founder Douglas L. Manship, Sr. still wanted "BR" in the station's calls, explaining the choice of "Z" at the end that "it was a good choice. 'Z' is a phonetically good sound on the air. It's distinctive." The "Z" was later expanded to mean "2" (similar to WGRZ in Buffalo, New York). Until 1989, WBRZ was a sister station to WJBO-AM and WYNK-FM, until the Manships sold both radio stations. From the late 1960s until the late 1970s, WYNK was considered an affiliate of WBRZ.

It dropped ABC in 1971 after WRBT-TV (now WVLA) signed on. This made WBRZ the sole NBC affiliate. Because ABC was seeking out new affiliates with stronger signal coverage at the time, WBRZ swapped affiliations with WRBT and became an ABC affiliate again on September 5, 1977. The Manship family's other television station, KRGV-TV in Weslaco, Texas, did the same a year before. In that same timeframe, NBC sank to third and last place while ABC moved up to first place in the ratings.

In July 1987, the station started broadcasting 24 hours a day, except on Sundays. In September 1988, the station became the first in Louisiana to close-caption its newscasts. In 1991, Manship's son Richard took over the station as its new president, and would later be named "Broadcaster of the Year" by the Louisiana Association of Broadcasters. WBRZ became the first station in Baton Rouge to begin broadcasting in high definition on channel 13 on April 22, 2002. Since then, it has simulcast repeats of its newscasts on channel 2.2, and until September 2017, it took over operations of a cable-only NOAA weather channel with radar on channel 2.3 (this channel is now exclusively simulcast on sister station KBTR 41.3).

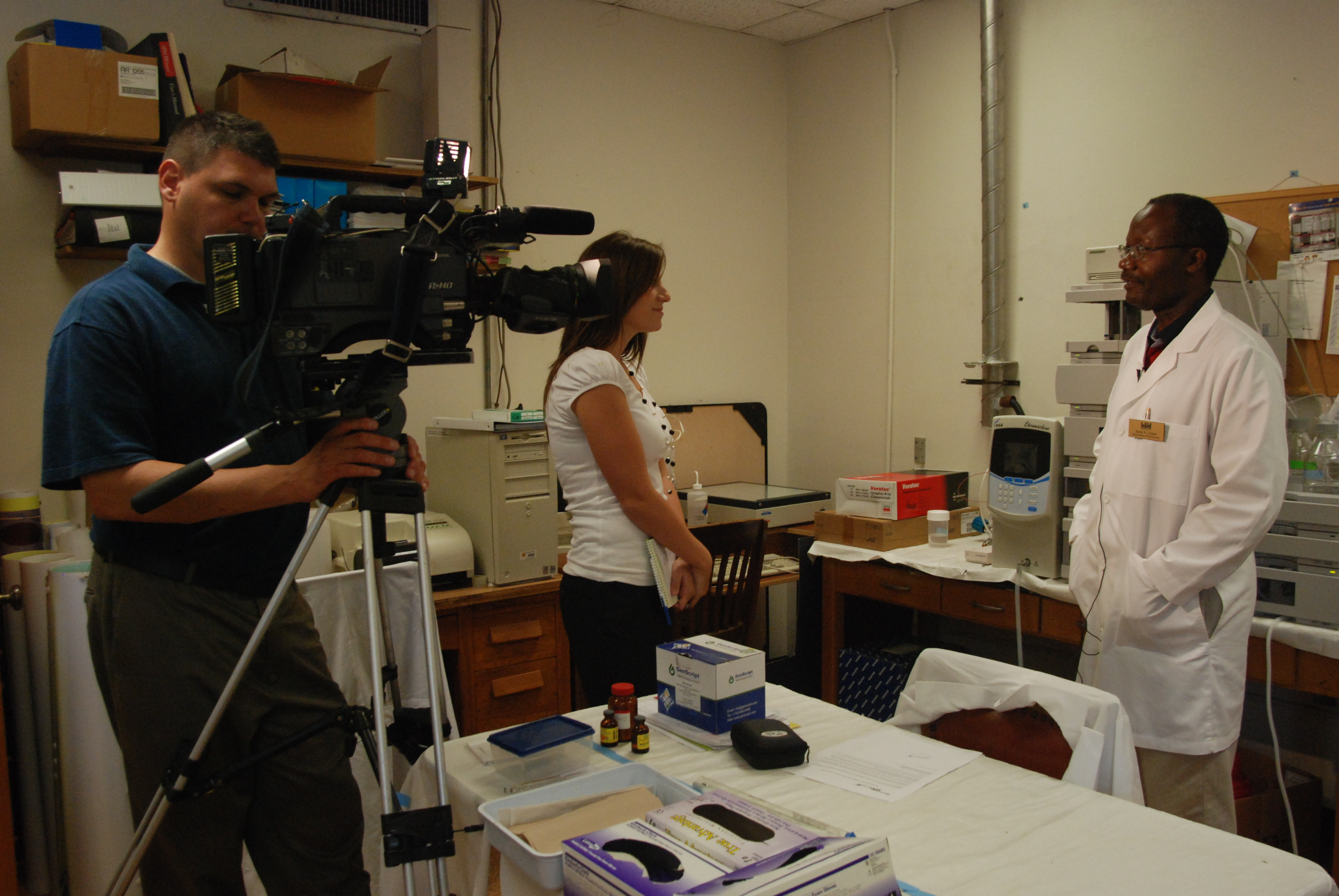
Dr. Jack Losso of LSU's Department of Food Science is interviewed for WBRZ in 2008

In late summer 2007, the Manships acquired a low-power independent station, KBTR (WBTR), from Veritas Broadcasting Company. In late 2012, WBRZ and WBTR took the This TV affiliation from a subchannel of WVLA. WBTR aired This TV on a secondary basis until the network folded in 2024.

WBRZ launched its own website, WBRZ.com, in 1996. In 2003, WBRZ and The Advocate shared a website, 2theadvocate.com, but during the week of September 14, 2009, WBRZ and the Advocate returned to having separate websites as the Manship family put The Advocate up for sale.

The station is a funding partner in The Cinderella Project of Baton Rouge, a charity providing free prom dresses to public high school students who cannot afford them. The charity held its third annual prom dress giveaway in 2010.

== Programming ==
=== Preemptions and deferrals ===
In 1993, WBRZ joined approximately 50 ABC affiliates in not airing the pilot episode of NYPD Blue due to local protests; the station decided on a week-by-week basis, at first, to air or not air episodes but eventually settled with airing episodes (including a rerun of the pilot).

In November 2004, WBRZ, along with many other ABC affiliates in the country, opted not to air the movie Saving Private Ryan when the network broadcast it uncut on Veterans Day. During Hurricane Katrina, the station worked with New Orleans ABC affiliate WGNO (channel 26) to provide coverage of the storm and its aftermath.

WBRZ has aired GMA: The Third Hour (previously The Chew and All My Children) at 11 a.m. on a one-day behind basis (three days behind for Friday's edition) due to the station's longtime noon newscast.

=== News operation ===
WBRZ was Baton Rouge's "news leader" in the ratings for much of its early history until the mid-1990s, given its history of always broadcasting on channel 2 (rival WAFB did not move to the VHF band until 1960) and its ties to the Baton Rouge newspapers, The Morning Advocate and The State-Times. The station experienced a ratings decline when Ed Buggs, the first African-American anchor in Baton Rouge, and many of its veteran anchors left the station in the mid-to-late 1990s amidst several format changes. This allowed CBS affiliate WAFB to overtake the lead in local news ratings, after competing with WBRZ for first place throughout the decade.

In 2004, the station dropped its twenty-year slogan of "On Your Side" and started describing their news as "Balanced. Fair. Accurate", which was inspired by Fox News' "Fair and Balanced" slogan. It was also in 2004 that the station introduced a 4 p.m. newscast to the Baton Rouge market after the cancellation of Donny Osmond's version of Pyramid. Today, WBRZ refers to itself as News 2 with the slogan "News You Can Turn To" and has revived "On Your Side" for special interest stories.

On July 29, 2007, WBRZ upgraded its set and news theme and began broadcasting their morning show 2une In and its noon, 4, 5, 6, and 10 p.m. newscasts in high-definition. WBRZ was the second station in the Baton Rouge area and the fourth in Louisiana to broadcast their newscasts in high definition.

On November 17, 2014, WBRZ introduced their new state-of-the-art upgrades set on their 5 p.m. newscasts, while maintaining the news theme "Extreme" by Stephen Arnold Music, which the station has used from 2007 HD upgrade until 2016.

WBRZ airs six hours of news each weekday, with two hours of morning news (2une In), one hour at noon, and half-hour newscasts at 4, 5, 6, and 10 p.m. On weekends, it airs a half-hour of morning news at 9 a.m. and prime time newscasts at 6 and 10 p.m. with a special interest report known as Sunday Journal on Sunday mornings.

On January 15, 2018, WBRZ rebranded its subchannel 2.2 to WBRZ Plus. With this rebrand, the station expanded its prime-time news offerings by extending its 6 and 10 p.m. newscasts to a full hour. The hour-long newscasts air on this subchannel, while the first 30 minutes of each newscast continue to air on WBRZ's main channel. In June 2021, WBRZ also began mixing programming from VSiN with its news programming on WBRZ Plus.

WBRZ was a 2023 recipient of an Alfred I. duPont–Columbia University Award for its investigative reporting on the Louisiana State Police cover-up of misconduct related to the death of Ronald Greene in 2019. It was the third time the channel received the award, known as the broadcast equivalent of the Pulitzer Prize.

==== Notable former on-air staff ====
- Sharon Weston Broome
- Kip Holden
- Margaret Orr
- Dallas Raines – chief meteorologist
- Jay Young – news anchor

== Technical information ==
=== Subchannels ===
The station's signal is multiplexed:

Subchannels of WBRZ-TV
Subchannel	Res.	Short name	Programming
2.1	720p	WBRZ-HD	ABC
2.2	720p	NEWS 2	Independent

Upon launching its digital signal, WBRZ aired its newscasts on a 24-hour stream on its second subchannel, and in late 2003, WBRZ took over operations for Cox Communications' cable-only NOAA weather channel. The new channel mixed NOAA's radio voiceover with WBRZ's radar, traffic cameras, and in the event of severe weather, live updates from the stations' weather team. In 2010, the radio feed was replaced with prerecorded forecasts from the team and by early 2021, became silent with cuts of the station's news theme, "Impact" by 615 Music playing in the background. In August 2017, WBRZ's news and weather channels were replicated on sister station KBTR's subchannels, and during September 2017, the weather channel, 2.3, was removed from WBRZ's feed to upgrade the news subchannel to 720p. The weather channel continues to be carried online and on sister station KBTR-CD's third subchannel, 36.3.

=== Analog-to-digital conversion ===
WBRZ-TV shut down its analog signal, over VHF channel 2, on June 12, 2009, the official date on which full-power television stations in the United States transitioned from analog to digital broadcasts under federal mandate. The station's digital signal remained on its pre-transition VHF channel 13, using virtual channel 2.
