= KZUP-CD =

Television station in Baton Rouge, Louisiana

ATSC 3.0 station
- Baton Rouge, Louisiana; United States
- Channels: Digital: 20 (UHF); Virtual: 20
- Branding: Z-TV

Programming
- Affiliations: 20.1: Independent

Ownership
- Owner: Nexstar Media Group; (Nexstar Media Inc.)
- Sister stations: WVLA-TV, WGMB-TV, WBRL-CD

History
- First air date: 1999 (on cable); November 26, 2002 (over-the-air)
- Former call signs: W19AW (1994–1995); KBTR-LP (1995–2002); KZUP-CA (2002–2010)
- Former affiliations: UPN (1999–2003); Independent (2003–2008); RTV (2008–2012)
- Call sign meaning: UPN (former affiliation)

Technical information
- Licensing authority: FCC
- Facility ID: 24975
- Class: CD
- ERP: 10 kW
- HAAT: 212.8 m (698 ft)
- Transmitter coordinates: 30°19′34.6″N 91°16′36.1″W

Links
- Public license information: Public file; LMS
- Website: www.louisianafirstnews.com

KZUP-CD (channel 20) is a low-power, Class A independent television station in Baton Rouge, Louisiana, United States. It is owned by Nexstar Media Group alongside Fox affiliate WGMB-TV (channel 44) and CW outlet WBRL-CD (channel 21), and is co-managed with NBC affiliate WVLA-TV (channel 33). The four stations share studios on Perkins Road in Baton Rouge; KZUP-CD's transmitter is located near Addis, Louisiana.

While KZUP-CD is the station's official call sign, it uses "KZUP-TV" for promotional purposes.

== History ==
The station signed on the air in 1999 as a WZUP, a UPN affiliate available only on cable (TCI and later Cox channel 13). It was the second UPN affiliate (of three) in the Baton Rouge area. When the station went over the air on November 26, 2002, it changed its call sign to KZUP-CA; originally it was going to air on channel 21 and WB affiliate WBRL-CA was on channel 19, but this assignment was short-lived. Channel 19 was once used as a translator station for local station and original UPN affiliate WBTR, and when KZUP went on the air, WBTR moved to previously-unused channel 41. It became an independent station after losing UPN to Raycom Media's WBXH-CA in 2003. As an independent, it called itself "Z-19," and it primarily aired African-American-oriented programming like Good Times, The Fresh Prince of Bel-Air, and The Jeffersons. For brief periods in 2005, KZUP was used to simulcast WVLA and WGMB over analog as their individual transmitter towers were turned off to allow upgrades for their digital television channels. KZUP became an affiliate of the Retro Television Network on September 15, 2008. In 2012, White Knight Broadcasting dropped RTV and resumed carrying syndicated programming.

On April 24, 2013, Communications Corporation of America announced the sale of its entire group to Nexstar Broadcasting Group. WVLA and KZUP were to be sold to Mission Broadcasting, but on August 13, 2014, Mission withdrew its application. The sale was completed on January 1, 2015. Nexstar would continue to operate WVLA and KZUP under a shared services agreement, with sister stations WGMB and WBRL.

KZUP was the official station of the Southern University athletic department.

On January 4, 2016, Nexstar agreed to exercise its option to purchase KZUP-CD. Nexstar also decided to enter KZUP-CD into the FCC's broadcast incentive auction, but the station's spectrum was never sold. The sale was approved by the FCC on February 19 and completed on March 17.

== Subchannels ==
Subchannel provided by KZUP-CD on the WBRL-CD multiplex (ATSC 1.0)
Subchannel	Res.	Short name	Programming
20.1	1080i	KZUP	Main KZUP-CD programming

=== ATSC 3.0 lighthouse service ===
Subchannels of KZUP-CD (ATSC 3.0)
Subchannel	Short name	Programming
20.1	KZUP-TV	Main KZUP-CD programming
21.1	WBRL-CW	The CW (WBRL-CD)
33.1	WVLA-TV	NBC (WVLA-TV)
44.1	WGMB-TV	Fox (WGMB-TV)
