= WLOO =

Television station in Vicksburg, Mississippi

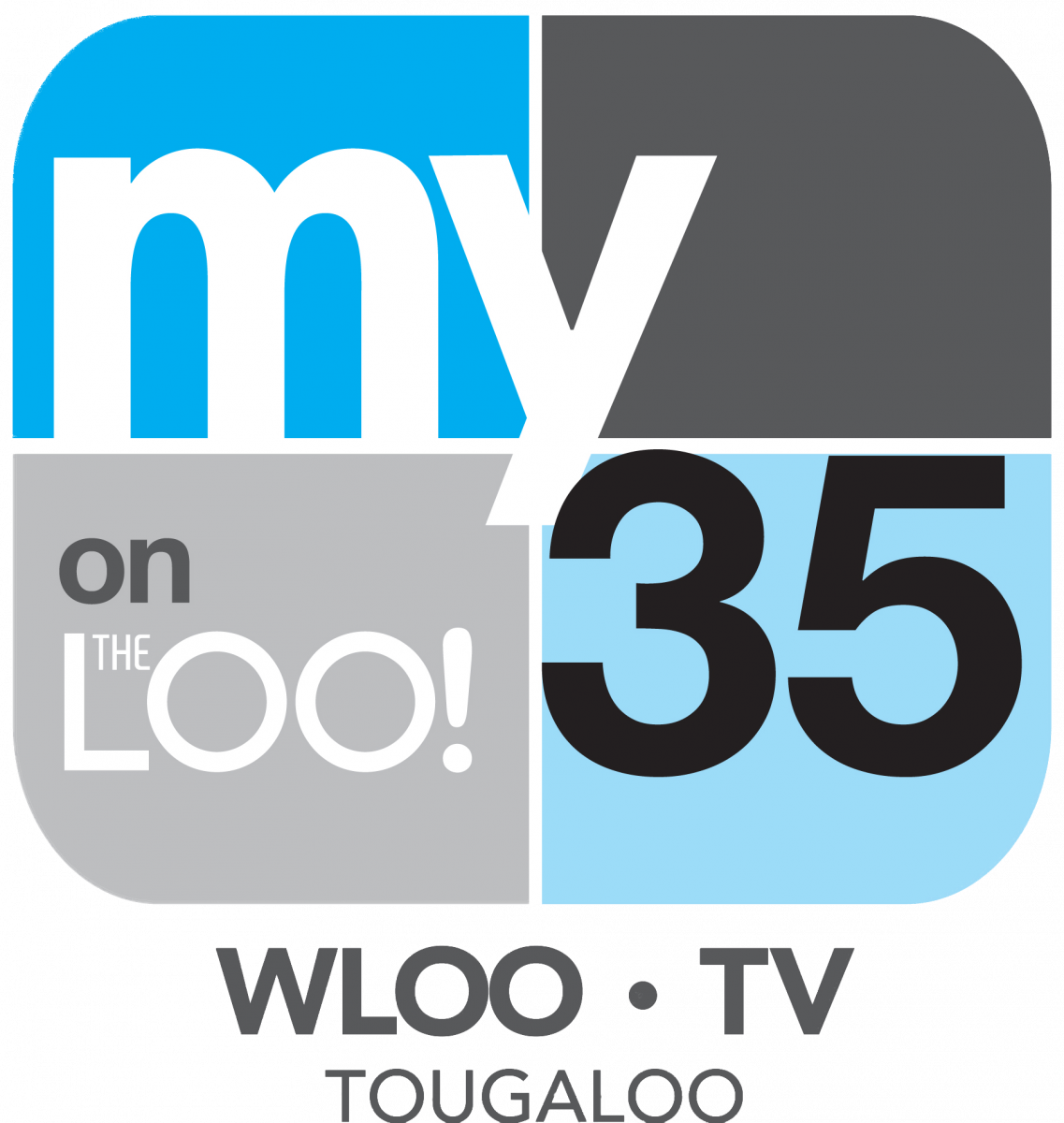
- Vicksburg–Jackson, Mississippi; United States
- City: Vicksburg, Mississippi
- Channels: Digital: 36 (UHF); Virtual: 35
- Branding: My 35 The Loo

Programming
- Affiliations: 35.1: Independent with MyNetworkTV; for others, see § Subchannels

Ownership
- Owner: Tougaloo College
- Operator: Gray Media
- Sister stations: WDBD, WLBT

History
- Founded: October 1, 1996
- First air date: September 29, 2003
- Former call signs: WUFX (2003–2013)
- Former channel numbers: Analog: 35 (UHF, 2003–2009); Digital: 41 (UHF, until 2018)
- Former affiliations: Fox (2003–July 2006); The WB (July–September 2006)
- Call sign meaning: Tougaloo

Technical information
- Licensing authority: FCC
- Facility ID: 84253
- ERP: 950 kW
- HAAT: 582 m (1,909 ft)
- Transmitter coordinates: 32°12′49.9″N 90°22′56.5″W

Links
- Public license information: Public file; LMS
- Website: www.tougaloo.edu/wloo

WLOO (channel 35) is a television station licensed to Vicksburg, Mississippi, United States, serving the Jackson area. It is programmed primarily as an independent station, but maintains a secondary affiliation with MyNetworkTV. WLOO is owned by Tougaloo College and operated by Gray Media alongside NBC affiliate WLBT (channel 3) and Fox affiliate WDBD (channel 40). The three stations share studios on South Jefferson Street in downtown Jackson; WLOO's transmitter is located on Thigpen Road southeast of Raymond, Mississippi.

== History ==
The station signed on September 29, 2003, as WUFX, airing an analog signal on UHF channel 35. The station was Jackson's second Fox affiliate; until its launch, there was no over-the-air affiliate in the area because WDBD had dropped the network in favor of The WB almost two years earlier in October 2001. During the previous 23 months, Fox programming was made available on cable in Jackson via Foxnet, although cable providers in the Natchez area carried WNTZ-TV from Alexandria, Louisiana, instead. Throughout its Fox affiliation, WUFX carried the branding "Fox 35" and used the slogan "Fox for You".

Channel 35 would have officially begun broadcasting at 11 a.m. on September 7 in time for the start of the 2003 NFL season. However, two members of the tower construction crew had shots fired at them at the station's analog transmitter site in Edwards on August 31. As a result, all work was halted for 22 days while the Hinds County Sheriff's Department conducted an investigation. Deputies eventually decided it was safe for the construction crew to resume work on WUFX's transmitter and even provided on-site security until its completion.

In early 2006, it was announced The WB and UPN would merge to form The CW. At the same time, News Corporation (owner of Fox) made public that another new network called MyNetworkTV would be launching as well. UPN affiliate WRBJ was announced as the new station for The CW while WUFX would join MyNetworkTV. In advance of the switch to MyNetworkTV, WUFX and WDBD swapped affiliations. On July 3, 2006, the station temporarily picked up The WB but began identifying itself on-air as "My 35" in anticipation of joining the new network. After joining MyNetworkTV, it continued carrying WB programming in a secondary nature until that network shut down on September 17. Meanwhile, WDBD rejoined Fox and adopted the branding "Fox 40". WUFX and WDBD were sold by Jackson Television to Roundtable Broadcasting in early 2010. However, the latter's licensee listing with the Federal Communications Commission (FCC) still said Jackson Television.

Vicksburg Broadcasting filed to sell WUFX and WBMS-CA to American Spirit Media in July 2012. As American Spirit also acquired WDBD and WXMS-LP from Roundtable Broadcasting, the WUFX license was then sold for $1 to Tougaloo College, though American Spirit provided sales services to the station under a joint sales agreement. Gray Television, owner of WLBT, provided certain services to the American Spirit stations under a shared services agreement. Tougaloo intended to use WUFX to teach its students about the operation of television stations. On November 13, the transaction was consummated. On April 15, 2013, the call letters were changed to WLOO.

== News operation ==
In April 2010, WDBD began producing a weeknight half-hour newscast on WUFX, called Fox 40 News at 10 on My 35, which competed against long-standing news broadcasts seen on the market's big three affiliates. After American Spirit Media completed its acquisition of WDBD and entered into the shared services agreement with WLBT, the Fox station's news department was shut down. Production of WDBD's newscasts was assumed by WLBT on November 12, 2012, with all of the news programming retained except for the 10 p.m. show on WUFX since it would compete with WLBT.

== Technical information ==
=== Subchannels ===
The station's signal is multiplexed:

Subchannels of WLOO
Subchannel	Res.	Short name	Programming
35.1	720p	WLOO-HD	Main WLOO programming
35.2	480i	H&I	Heroes & Icons
35.3	480i	StartTV	Start TV
35.4	480i	Catchy	Catchy Comedy
35.5	480i	MeToons	MeTV Toons
35.6	480i	Movies	Movies!

=== Analog-to-digital conversion ===
WLOO (as WUFX) shut down its analog signal, over UHF channel 35, on May 4, 2009. The station's digital signal remained on its pre-transition UHF channel 41, using virtual channel 35.

WUFX was granted an original construction permit after the FCC finalized the digital television allotment plan on April 21, 1997. As a result, the station did not receive a companion channel for a digital television station.
