= Wireless Battle of the Mesh =

Convention on wireless networking

battlemesh v.12 organized in 2019, in "Le 6b" the art-residency in Saint-Denis, France (illustrating location/topic)

The Wireless Battle of the Mesh (referred to as Battlemesh or WBM) is an annual, non-commercial communal gathering/convention focused on the development and testing of wireless mesh networking protocols and community-owned network infrastructure. It gathers developers, community networks activists/advocates, and researchers. The event relies on sponsorships and community donations to remain accessible to activists from developing regions and students.

== Themes and relevance ==
The primary goal of the event is to test these protocols in a "real-world" environment—a large-scale test-bed consisting of numerous wireless nodes—to compare their performance, stability, and scalability. Beyond the technical "battle," the event features workshops and presentations on the political and social aspects of networking, including the right to Internet access, digital sovereignty, and the maintenance of grassroots internet infrastructure.

Activities include, but are not limited to: Protocol tests where participants set up a heterogeneous network of routers to run automated benchmarks, measuring throughput, latency, and convergence speed across different protocols; Hacking sessions often as late-night sessions dedicated to fixing bugs found during testing or developing new features for mesh-related software like LibreMesh; Social and political tracks for lectures, workshops and discussions on how community networks can bridge the digital divide and remain resilient against centralized corporate or government control.

Battlemesh serves as a physical meeting ground for the developers of various open-source routing protocols, such as Babel, B.A.T.M.A.N., BMX, and OLSR. It sometime also hosts the OpenWrt Summit, a gathering for the developers and users of the OpenWrt Linux distribution.Battlemesh significance was identified by NASA researchers as a key venue where enthusiast communities evaluate mesh technologies and routing protocols. Association for Progressive Communications (APC) reported on the significance of Battlemesh events for global community networks, highlighting the 2024 event in Cyprus for its role in fostering connections between grassroots networkers in conflict-affected regions. Widely cited report involving Battlemesh was: FCC Locks Down Router Firmware (2016) occurred when the community first alerted the tech world to a major policy shift with network hardware. The EU-funded netCommons project (Network Infrastructure as Commons) included Battlemesh in its official dissemination reports as a primary international forum for the development of community-owned network protocols and alternative network governance. Austrian media researcher Armin Medosch writes on technical evolution of the Battlemesh convention in his book: The Rise of the Network Commons.

== History ==
The event has been held annually since 2009, rotating through different European cities and sub-urban areas to support local community networks. Notable past locations include:

- v1 (2008): Paris, France
- v4 (2011): Barcelona, Spain
- v8 (2015): Maribor, Slovenia
- v12 (2019): Saint-Denis, France
- v16 (2024): Nicosia, Cyprus
- v17 (2025): Sundhausen, Germany
- v18 closing public presentation day at Residence Pueblo Escondido
  v18 (2026): Gornji Karin, Croatia

== Literature ==
- Medosch, Armin (2025). The Rise of the Network Commons. Institute of Network Cultures, Amsterdam. (ISBN 978-90-835209-2-6).
