= Web Business Management System =

WBMS (Web Business Management System) is a web-based software that manages or runs a website with specific business functions or requirements. These web-based tools allows business owners to run their website with a business mindset.

Features of a WBMS can contain:

- Content Management System or Content Control – the ability to change content in a website
- Blog – ability to post blogs and syndicate via RSS feeds
- E-commerce – to accept secure payment for products and/or services
- CRM – (Customer Relationship Management) manage customer data captured from all aspects of communication within the website
