= WLBT =

Television station in Jackson, Mississippi

- Jackson, Mississippi; United States
- Channels: Digital: 30 (UHF); Virtual: 3
- Branding: WLBT 3; WLBT News

Programming
- Affiliations: 3.1: NBC; for others, see § Subchannels

Ownership
- Owner: Gray Media; (Gray Television Licensee, LLC)
- Sister stations: WDBD, WLOO

History
- First air date: December 19, 1953; (current license dates from June 14, 1971)
- Former call signs: WJDT (CP)
- Former channel numbers: Analog: 3 (VHF, 1953–2009); Digital: 9 (VHF, 2005–2009), 7 (VHF, 2009–2010)
- Former affiliations: Both secondary: ABC (1953–1970); NTA (1956–1961)
- Call sign meaning: Lamar Broadcast Television (former owner)

Technical information
- Licensing authority: FCC
- Facility ID: 68542
- ERP: 535 kW
- HAAT: 624 m (2,047 ft)
- Transmitter coordinates: 32°12′49.9″N 90°22′56.5″W

Links
- Public license information: Public file; LMS
- Website: www.wlbt.com

WLBT (channel 3) is a television station in Jackson, Mississippi, United States, affiliated with NBC. It is owned by Gray Media alongside Fox affiliate WDBD (channel 40) and co-managed with Tougaloo College–owned WLOO (channel 35), an independent station with MyNetworkTV. The three stations share studios on South Jefferson Street in downtown Jackson; WLBT's transmitter is located on Thigpen Road southeast of Raymond, Mississippi.

Originally a pro-segregationist outlet, in 1969, it became the first television station to be stripped of its right to broadcast for failing to serve the public interest. It was then relaunched under different ownership, becoming a pioneer in racial equality among Southern broadcasters.

== History ==
The station was founded on December 19, 1953, by the Lamar Life Insurance Company, owners of radio station WJDX; the WLBT call sign stands for Lamar Broadcasting Television. It is Jackson's second-oldest television station, following WJTV (channel 25), which debuted in January 1953. Channel 3 is also Mississippi's third-oldest television station (WTOK-TV in Meridian went on the air three months earlier).

WLBT has always been an NBC affiliate, given WJDX's affiliation with that network, though it shared ABC with WJTV until WAPT (channel 16) started broadcasting in 1970. During the late 1950s, the station was also briefly affiliated with the NTA Film Network.

=== Opposition to civil rights ===
A 1962 WLBT editorial protesting the admission of James Meredith to the University of Mississippi.

The station gained notoriety for its aggressive support of racial segregation in Mississippi in the 1950s and 1960s. Lamar had close ties to the state's white political and business elite and with segregationist groups, such as the White Citizens' Council (WCC). Indeed, a number of station executives, including general manager Fred Beard, were Citizens' Council members. It went as far as to coordinate opposition to civil rights with these groups. For instance, the station allowed the WCC to operate a bookstore in the lobby of its studios in downtown Jackson. Beard editorialized on the air against the admission of James Meredith to the University of Mississippi in 1962, arguing that states should determine who should and should not be allowed to attend their schools.

For the most part, the station ignored the civil rights movement, blacking out coverage of it from NBC News programming (and often falsely claiming that the interruptions were the result of technical difficulties), and providing a platform on its local newscasts and public affairs programs for individuals advocating resistance to efforts by the federal government to integrate public schools and allow African-Americans to vote. It also preempted NBC programs that even mildly referred to racial justice or featured African-American actors prominently. In 1955, when civil rights lawyer Thurgood Marshall—later appointed to the U.S. Supreme Court—appeared on The Today Show, WLBT interrupted the interview, putting up a sign that said, "Sorry, Cable Trouble." Beard later declared he had pulled the interview, saying that television networks had become instruments of "Negro propaganda".

Owners and staffers at several other television stations in the South did not like network coverage of the Civil Rights Movement, including WBRC-TV in Birmingham, Alabama, WRAL-TV in Raleigh, North Carolina, and WUSN-TV in Charleston, South Carolina. Although some Southern stations severed their ties with their networks in order to prevent being forced to air coverage of the movement (WRAL and WUSN both switched from NBC to ABC in 1962), WLBT kept its affiliation with NBC, even though that network historically had an extremely low tolerance towards local preemptions at the time. Indeed, many NBC stars, like Bonanza's Michael Landon and Pernell Roberts, were speaking out on behalf of civil rights. This was largely because WLBT's only competition was CBS affiliate WJTV, a situation that lasted until 1970, when the market picked up a full-time ABC affiliate in WAPT.

Over the years, NBC—along with civil rights groups and the work of Rev. Everett Parker of the United Church of Christ (UCC)—sent numerous petitions to the Federal Communications Commission (FCC) to complain of WLBT's flagrant bias. The FCC issued several warnings to Lamar, but these went unheeded. Finally, in 1964, Rev. Parker and the UCC's Office of Communication formally petitioned the FCC to revoke WLBT's license. The FCC ruled that the petitioners had no standing because they had no economic interest in the station or were not subject to electronic interference from WLBT's signal. The UCC appealed to the United States Court of Appeals for the District of Columbia. In 1966, the court, in an opinion by Warren Burger, later to become Chief Justice of the United States, ruled that the public had the right to take part in FCC hearings in order to protect the public interest.

By this time, WLBT had taken a few steps to change its segregationist image. It had fired Beard, hired some Black announcers and began airing Black church services. At a new hearing held in 1967, the FCC again ruled in favor of Lamar. The UCC again appealed to the Appeals Court, which found Lamar's record to be beyond repair and ordered the FCC to revoke Lamar's license in 1969. Lamar appealed, but lost in 1971. To this day, WLBT remains one of only two television stations that has ever lost its license for violating FCC regulations on fairness. The other station, WJIM-TV in Lansing, Michigan, had its license reinstated on appeal.

While hearings were held for a permanent licensee, WLBT's license was transferred to Communications Improvement, Inc.—an integrated, non-profit group that promised to make the station a beacon of tolerance—on June 14, 1971, at 3 a.m. A new group of managers, including some of the first African American television executives in the South, recreated the station as a far more neutral news source. However, it retained the WLBT call sign and claimed the original station's history as its own. It also retained the NBC affiliation and most of its employees, and donated revenue to charities.

In 1973, the FCC was asked to revoke WLBT's broadcast license because the station's largest shareholder, William Mounger, also served as a Jackson Academy Vice President. The FCC filing stated that, since Mounger was affiliated with a segregation academy, he was not fit to hold a broadcast license. In 1974, the FCC rejected the complaint on the grounds that the complaint was untimely since the evidence of Mounger's association with the school and the school's discriminatory practices was available from at least 1969.

=== WLBT today ===
WLBT was one of the first television stations in the South to devote a significant block of airtime and dedicated personnel to the production of local investigative, documentary-style news—these blocks typically aired during off-network hours. Probe was a 30-minute program that aired weekly. It garnered numerous awards, including a George Foster Peabody award in 1976 for a segment called "Power Politics in Mississippi".

As the hearings dragged out through the 1970s, the five competing groups concluded that nothing was to be gained from further proceedings. They merged as TV-3, Inc., a consortium with Blacks holding controlling interest and headed by a majority-Black board. The merged group was awarded the license in late 1979, and took control of WLBT on January 9, 1980. In 1984, Civic Communications, one of the five groups that won the full license, bought out its partners and became sole owner of the station. Frank Melton, who later became mayor of Jackson, became CEO.

From 1982 to 1991, WLBT operated a low-power satellite in Meridian, WLBM; that station is now a stand-alone station, WGBC.

In 2000, Melton sold WLBT to Liberty Corporation. Even with the station's growth over the last two decades (see below), the growing trend toward consolidation in the media industry made it difficult for Melton to buy stronger syndicated programming or sell advertising. Liberty in turn merged with Raycom Media in 2006.

On June 25, 2018, Atlanta-based Gray Television announced it had reached an agreement with Raycom to merge their respective broadcasting assets (consisting of Raycom's 63 existing owned-and/or-operated television stations, including WLBT, WDBD and WLOO), and Gray's 93 television stations) under Gray's corporate umbrella. The cash-and-stock merger transaction valued at $3.6 billion—in which Gray shareholders would acquire preferred stock held by Raycom—resulted in WLBT gaining new sister stations in nearby markets, including CBS/ABC affiliate KNOE-TV in Monroe, Louisiana, and ABC affiliate WTOK-TV in Meridian. The combined company would be in every Mississippi market except for Greenville and Columbus–Tupelo as a result. The sale was approved on December 20, and was completed on January 2, 2019.

== Tower collapse ==
On October 23, 1997, three Canadian men from Canada's LeBlanc & Royal were preparing to replace the guy wires of WLBT's 1,999-foot (609 m) transmission tower near Raymond when the tower collapsed, killing them. The workers were at the 1,500-foot (457 m) level and held on to the tower as it fell.

The tower's collapse knocked WLBT and the local PBS/Mississippi ETV Network station WMPN off the air for several hours. WLBT was able to resume broadcasting on a 100-foot (30 m) secondary tower, which only reached about half of its normal viewing area until a new 2,000-foot (610 m) tower was completed in 1999.

The 1,999-foot tower was actually the second WLBT transmission tower to fall at their Raymond site. WLBT's original transmission tower collapsed on March 3, 1966, when the Candlestick Park Tornado, one of only two F5 tornadoes in Mississippi's history, struck the tower and transmitter building. WLBT engineers salvaged what they could of the transmitter and operated on the same stand by tower as it would operate with later after the second tower collapse. When the replacement tower was completed later in 1966, the new tower was one of the tallest structures east of the Mississippi River and was in service until the second collapse in 1997.

== Programming ==
There were two noteworthy preemptions made by WLBT after the start of its 1971 license. One was the miniseries Freedom Road (which was filmed in nearby Natchez) and another was the short-lived animated sitcom God, the Devil and Bob. The latter was mostly preempted due to the controversy it stirred within the religious community.

On December 30, 2023, WLBT parent company Gray Television announced it had reached an agreement with the New Orleans Pelicans to air 10 games on the station during the 2023–24 season. On September 17, 2024, Gray and the Pelicans announced a broader deal to form the Gulf Coast Sports & Entertainment Network, which would broadcast nearly all 2024–25 Pelicans games on Gray's stations in the Gulf South, including WLBT.

=== News operation ===
For most of the last 30 years, WLBT has been the dominant news station in Jackson. It currently has the market's only helicopter used for breaking news gathering and traffic reports. The station launched a weekday afternoon 4 p.m. newscast in March 2008; this was the first of its kind in Jackson. In October 2010, WLBT began broadcasting its local newscasts in high definition becoming the second television outlet in the area to make the upgrade.

After American Spirit Media completed its acquisition of WDBD and entered into a shared services agreement with WLBT, the Fox station's news department was shut down resulting in several members of the WDBD staff being laid-off. Production of its newscasts was assumed by WLBT on November 12, 2012, with all of the news programming retained (except for the 10 p.m. show on WUFX, now WLOO, since it would compete with WLBT). In addition, WDBD added Saturday and Sunday editions of its prime time broadcast at 9.

All newscasts on WDBD originate from WLBT's primary set at the South Jefferson Street studios except with separate on-air duratrans and graphics indicating the Fox-branded newscasts. Although it shares a majority of on-air personnel with WLBT, WDBD maintains a separate additional news anchor for the weekday morning and weeknight shows. WLBT and WDBD operate a combined news department under the Mississippi News Now branding.

==== Notable former on-air staff ====
- Woodie Assaf – weather reporter (1953–2001)
- Randall Pinkston – reporter and anchor (1971–1974)

== Technical information ==
=== Subchannels ===
The station's signal is multiplexed:

Subchannels of WLBT
| Subchannel | Res. | Short name | Programming |
|---|---|---|---|
| 3.1 | 1080i | WLBT-DT | NBC |
| 3.2 | 480i | Bounce | Bounce TV |
| 3.3 | 480i | GCSEN | Gulf Coast SEN |
| 3.4 | 480i | Laff | Laff |
| 3.5 | 480i | Mystery | Ion Mystery |
| 3.6 | 480i | DABL | Dabl |
| 3.7 | 480i | The365 | 365BLK |

=== Analog-to-digital conversion ===
WLBT shut down its analog signal, over VHF channel 3, on June 12, 2009, as part of the federally mandated transition from analog to digital television. The station's digital signal relocated its pre-transition to VHF channel 7, using virtual channel 3.

On January 14, 2010, WLBT moved to UHF channel 30, because of viewers having difficulty receiving their signal on VHF channel 7. Some stations solved the problem with the power increase, but WLBT could not due to potential interference to another station. The former channel 7 transmitter was later moved to its sister station in Laurel–Hattiesburg, WDAM-TV.

== See also ==
- Timeline of the civil rights movement
- On the Front Lines: Television and African-American Issues From the Museum of Television & Radio; includes info on WLBT in the 1960s
- Woodie Assaf
