= WGMB-TV =

Television station in Baton Rouge, Louisiana

- Baton Rouge, Louisiana; United States
- Channels: Digital: 24 (UHF); Virtual: 44
- Branding: WGMB Fox 44; Louisiana First News

Programming
- Affiliations: 44.1: Fox; 44.2: The CW; for others, see § Subchannels

Ownership
- Owner: Nexstar Media Group; (Nexstar Media Inc.)
- Sister stations: WBRL-CD, WVLA-TV, KZUP-CD

History
- Founded: September 21, 1990
- First air date: August 11, 1991
- Former call signs: WPFT (CP, 1990); WGMB (1990–2009)
- Former channel numbers: Analog: 44 (UHF, 1991–2009); Digital: 45 (UHF, until 2020)
- Call sign meaning: Galloway Media Broadcasting (former owner); -or-; Gumbo

Technical information
- Licensing authority: FCC
- Facility ID: 12520
- ERP: 665 kW
- HAAT: 422.6 m (1,386 ft)
- Transmitter coordinates: 30°19′34.6″N 91°16′36.1″W

Links
- Public license information: Public file; LMS
- Website: www.louisianafirstnews.com

WGMB-TV (channel 44) is a television station in Baton Rouge, Louisiana, United States, affiliated with the Fox network. It is owned by Nexstar Media Group alongside CW outlet WBRL-CD (channel 21) and independent station KZUP-CD (channel 19), and is co-managed with NBC affiliate WVLA-TV (channel 33). The four stations share studios on Perkins Road in Baton Rouge; WGMB-TV's transmitter is located near Addis, Louisiana.

== History ==
The station first signed on August 11, 1991, making Baton Rouge the last of the Top 100 television markets to receive a Fox affiliate. The station was originally owned by the Galloway family, whose broadcast holdings originally operated under both the Associated Broadcasters and Galloway Media and eventually the Communications Corporation of America banner. It took five years to bring Fox to Baton Rouge, as the Federal Communications Commission (FCC) assigned channel 44 to Baton Rouge in 1983, and several potential buyers sought a license. One company, Parish Family Television, expressed an interest in broadcasting an independent station affiliated with the network in 1986 with the call letters WPFT. Delays occurred as Southwest Multimedia of Houston expressed an ownership interest in Parish Family Television and rival company Louisiana Super Communications objected to this sale. In November 1990, Thomas Galloway of Lafayette purchased the license from PFTV in November 1990 as well as the Texas stations KVEO, KWKT, and KPEJ from Southwest Multimedia, causing Louisiana Super Communications to rescind its objections to the sale. The station installed an antenna on WVLA's tower, bought from future sister station WNTZ's parent company at the time, Delta Media Corporation. From April 1990 to February 1991, local NBC affiliate WVLA aired week-delayed episodes of Fox shows such as The Simpsons, Married... with Children, and In Living Color.

In addition to its Fox affiliation, WGMB also carried several syndicated movie packages including Columbia Pictures' Night at the Movies and Universal Television's Action Pack and was a secondary affiliate of PTEN in its early years of operation. In 1996, WGMB became a sister station of WVLA when Thomas Galloway's son, Sheldon, purchased the NBC affiliate from businessman Cyril Vetter. Sheldon had previously held a stake in WGMB but sold it to his father to make it easier for him to buy WVLA.

The station originally broadcast from Florida Boulevard, until the Galloways purchased WVLA. In 1999, WGMB, along with WVLA, WBBR (now WBRL), and WZUP (now KZUP), moved to their current studios on Perkins Road in Baton Rouge.

In June 2006, owner ComCorp filed for Chapter 11 bankruptcy protection. ComCorp said in a press release viewers and staff would see no changes at the station.

On April 24, 2013, ComCorp announced the sale of its entire group, including WGMB-TV, to the Nexstar Broadcasting Group. The local marketing agreement for WVLA-TV (which was to be sold to Mission Broadcasting, but it was later withdrawn) is included in the deal. The sale was completed on January 1, 2015.

== Programming ==
WGMB did not produce a local newscast until 2007; however, it usually broadcast children's events and programming from around the Baton Rouge area in the 1990s as part of its Fox 44 Kids Club. One locally-produced show was Fox Rox Saturday, which aired in the late 1990s on Saturday mornings. WGMB also aired one high school football game each week during the fall from the Baton Rouge area in the early 2000s.

=== News operation ===
Original Fox 44 News logo for WGMB

On March 12, 2007, WGMB debuted a local newscast entitled Fox News Louisiana airing weeknights at 9 p.m. In the summer of 2008, the newscast was rebranded as Fox News Baton Rouge. WGMB also produces and pre-records the 9 p.m. newscast for sister station KADN-TV in Lafayette, and formerly did so for KMSS-TV in Shreveport. The KMSS-TV evening newscast is now handled by sister station KTAL. The newscast was expanded to an hour in February 2013.

On August 20, 2007, WGMB debuted Fox News Louisiana AM to counter the national morning shows; the newscast, anchored by Rachel Slavik and Lauren Unger, featured eight weather updates an hour from meteorologist Jesse Gunkel. It also was simulcast on sister station WNTZ in Alexandria, although stories from that area rarely made it to the program. On December 2, 2008, WGMB canceled its morning newscast due to cost cuts; at the same time, the station also laid off an undisclosed number of employees. WGMB's sister station, NBC affiliate WVLA, would continue to air its 6 a.m. local newscast, which precedes Today.

On April 28, 2009, WGMB announced the discontinuation of all locally produced newscasts. Production of the 9 p.m. newscast was then moved to sister station KETK-TV in Tyler, Texas. WGMB also aired a 30-minute sports program called The Show on Sunday nights at 9 p.m., which was also produced by KETK. On January 3, 2011, WGMB returned to producing its 9 p.m. newscast locally from Baton Rouge.

On April 12, 2016, WGMB debuted a 5:30 p.m. weekday newscast. WGMB's newscast re-airs on sister station WBRL at 10:30 p.m. WGMB also produces two weekend sports programs: Geaux Nation, which focuses on LSU athletics and also airs on sister station KLFY in Lafayette, and Inside the Jaguar Nation, which focuses on Southern University athletics.

On January 10, 2025, WGMB and WVLA debuted new graphics and news music, uniting all the newscasts produced by the two stations under the title Louisiana First News. WGMB also updated its station logo.

== Technical information ==
=== Subchannels ===
The station's signal is multiplexed:

Subchannels of WGMB-TV
Subchannel	Res.	Short name	Programming
44.1	720p	WGMBTV1	Fox
44.2	1080i	WBRL-CW	The CW (WBRL-CD)
44.3	480i	COZI	Cozi TV
44.4	480i	365 Blk	365BLK

Simulcast of subchannels of another station

=== Analog-to-digital conversion ===
WGMB-TV ended regular programming on its analog signal, over UHF channel 44, on June 12, 2009, the official date on which full-power television stations in the United States transitioned from analog to digital broadcasts under federal mandate. The station digital signal remained on its pre-transition UHF channel 45, using virtual channel 44.

As part of the SAFER Act, WGMB-TV kept its analog signal on the air until June 26 to inform viewers of the digital television transition through a loop of public service announcements from the National Association of Broadcasters.

Since the station upgraded to digital, WGMB has rebroadcast the signal of the low-power WB and CW affiliate WBRL-CD on its second subchannel, originally in standard definition and later in 720p high definition in September 2021, and then 1080i in April 2023. On January 25, 2018, WGMB added Cozi TV to its third subchannel, and on May 2, 2025, WGMB added 365BLK to its fourth subchannel.
