= WBRL-CD =

Television station in Baton Rouge, Louisiana

- Baton Rouge, Louisiana; United States
- Channels: Digital: 21 (UHF); Virtual: 21
- Branding: Baton Rouge CW 21

Programming
- Affiliations: The CW

Ownership
- Owner: Nexstar Media Group; (Nexstar Media Inc.)
- Sister stations: WGMB-TV, WVLA-TV, KZUP-CD

History
- First air date: March 30, 1989
- Former call signs: K65EF (1989–1992); K21DQ (1992–1995); KANC-LP (1995–2002); WBRL-CA (2002–2011)
- Former channel numbers: Analog: 65 (UHF, 1989–1992), 21 (UHF, 1992–2011), 20 (UHF, share with KZUP-CD, 2011–2020s)
- Former affiliations: Independent (1989–1995); All News Channel (1995–2002); The WB (2002–2006)
- Call sign meaning: Baton Rouge, Louisiana

Technical information
- Licensing authority: FCC
- Facility ID: 24976
- ERP: 10 kW
- HAAT: 212.8 m (698 ft)
- Transmitter coordinates: 30°19′34.6″N 91°16′36.1″W
- Translator(s): WGMB-TV 44.2 Baton Rouge

Links
- Public license information: Public file; LMS
- Website: www.louisianafirstnews.com

WBRL-CD (channel 21) is a low-power, Class A television station in Baton Rouge, Louisiana, United States, serving as the local outlet for The CW. It is owned by Nexstar Media Group alongside Fox affiliate WGMB-TV (channel 44) and independent station KZUP-CD (channel 19), and is co-managed with NBC affiliate WVLA-TV (channel 33). The four stations share studios on Perkins Road in Baton Rouge; WBRL-CD's transmitter is located near Addis, Louisiana.

In addition to its own digital signal, WBRL-CD is simulcast in 1080i full high definition on WGMB's second digital subchannel (44.2) from the same transmitter site.

== History ==
Communications Corporation of America brought WB programming to Baton Rouge cable subscribers on February 1, 1999, as WBBR, a cable-only station on Cox Communications channel 10 (WBBR's call sign was used in a fictitious manner). Previously, WB programming was available on WTVK-LP, a low-power station owned by Gulf Atlantic Communications which was also affiliated with America One. While WTVK was carried by several smaller cable providers in the greater Baton Rouge area, including those in Clinton, Jackson, and Watson, as well as on LSU's cable system, TCI, then Baton Rouge's cable company, did not carry the station, and it only had a broadcasting range of six miles (9.7 km). TCI, however, did carry WGN irregularly between 1995 and 1999, making WB programming available to subscribers. Eventually, WTVK signed off, and channel 11 became occupied by KPBN-LP, an America One affiliate.

The station now known as WBRL signed on the air March 30, 1989, as K65EF on channel 65. It was founded by Woody Jenkins of Great Oaks Broadcasting Corporation and initially served as a translator for independent station WBTR, as that station initially had trouble getting picked up on local cable systems in the greater Baton Rouge area. In 1995, it became KANC-LP, channel 21 and served as Baton Rouge's first all-news station affiliated with the All News Channel. On November 13, 2002, WTNC was purchased by ComCorp with the objective of bringing WBBR/WB programming over-the air. The call sign was changed to WBRL and was initially supposed to be on channel 19 before Communications Corporation decided to put it on channel 21 (sister station KZUP-CD was on channel 19, but is now on channel 20; some station identifications from 2002 erroneously branded the station as WB 19 instead of WB 21). WBRL was previously used as the call letters to the FM counterpart to WJBO from 1941 to 1958—this station is now WYNK-FM and is unrelated to WBRL-CD.

On March 7, 2006, Baton Rouge's UPN affiliate, WBXH, announced that they would take affiliation with MyNetworkTV in September. On March 9, 2006, it was announced that WBRL would affiliate with The CW.

In June 2006, owner ComCorp filed for Chapter 11 bankruptcy protection. ComCorp said in a press release viewers and staff would see no changes at the station.

On April 24, 2013, ComCorp announced the sale of its entire group, including WGMB and WBRL-CD, to the Nexstar Broadcasting Group. The local marketing agreement for WVLA and KZUP-CD (which is retaining ownership with White Knight Broadcasting) is included in the deal. The sale was completed on January 1, 2015.

On July 1, 2020, WBRL relocated its digital channel from channel 21 to channel 20 to prevent co-interference from WHNO in New Orleans, sharing channel space with its sister station, KZUP. On November 1, 2021, WBRL's simulcast on WGMB-DT2 was upgraded to 720p high definition.

== Newscasts ==
Since March 2017, WBRL has reaired the 9 p.m. newscast from WGMB at 10:30 p.m.

== Subchannel ==
Subchannel of WBRL-CD
Subchannel	Res.	Short name	Programming
21.1	1080i	WBRL-CW	The CW
20.1	1080i	KZUP	KZUP-CD (Independent)

Broadcast on behalf of another station
