= KBTR-CD =

Television station in Baton Rouge, Louisiana

- Baton Rouge, Louisiana; United States
- Channels: Digital: 36 (UHF); Virtual: 36
- Branding: WBTR 36

Programming
- Affiliations: 36.1: Independent; for others, see § Subchannels

Ownership
- Owner: Manship family; (Louisiana Television Broadcasting, LLC)
- Sister stations: WBRZ-TV

History
- First air date: May 1, 1987
- Former call signs: W49KG (1987–1991); KBTR-CA (1991–2015)
- Former channel numbers: Analog: 49 (UHF, 1987–1988), 19 (UHF, 1988–2002), 41 (UHF, 2002–2015); Digital: 41 (UHF, 2015–2020)
- Former affiliations: Independent (1987–1995, 2006–2020); All News Channel (early–mid 1990s); UPN (1995–2001); Urban America Television (2001–2006); This TV (2012–2024)
- Call sign meaning: ICAO code for the Baton Rouge Metropolitan Airport; -or-; "Better Television for Baton Rouge" (former slogan)

Technical information
- Licensing authority: FCC
- Facility ID: 24977
- Class: CD
- ERP: 15 kW
- HAAT: 187.9 m (616 ft)
- Transmitter coordinates: 30°25′57″N 91°11′7″W

Links
- Public license information: Public file; LMS

KBTR-CD (channel 36), is a low-power, Class A independent television station in Baton Rouge, Louisiana, United States. It is owned by Louisiana Television Broadcasting alongside ABC affiliate WBRZ-TV (channel 2). The two stations share studios on Highland Road in Baton Rouge, where KBTR-CD's transmitter is also located.

While KBTR-CD is the station's official call sign, it uses WBTR for promotional purposes.

== History ==
The channel began on May 1, 1987, as W49KG, a low-power independent station on UHF channel 49. It was the first over-the-air outlet of non-network programming in Baton Rouge. Branding as "WKG-TV", it was owned by Woody Jenkins and Great Oaks Broadcasting. The call letters were chosen because of a partnership with WKG-TV-Video-Electronic College, which taught television and radio broadcasting and production. It did not have a local newscast but, instead, ran Independent Network News. Following several format tests, the station officially began broadcasting 24 hours a day on August 5, 1987.

On October 20, 1988, it moved to UHF channel 19. From the start, the station had trouble getting added to the Baton Rouge cable lineup due to its low-power status. To improve its reach, it retransmitted its signal on various translator stations; namely, K07UJ, K13VE, W19AW, W39AT, and K65EF. On May 15, 1989, Cablevision added the station to its lineup. The station changed its call letters to KBTR-CA on February 1, 1991, in order to emphasize its local programming and started branding itself using the melody of the Steely Dan song "Hey Nineteen" for its station IDs. In January 1995, it became Baton Rouge's first UPN affiliate; it also carried programming from the All News Channel overnight in the early-to-mid 1990s. While affiliated with UPN, KBTR continued to use W39AT and K65EF as translators, while K07UJ and K13VE were used as translators for Jenkins's other station in Baton Rouge: WTNC, which was a short-lived 24-hour news channel serving the capital city.

Even after KBTR affiliated with UPN, the station was in danger of being dropped from Baton Rouge cable systems. In 1996, TCI, which had bought Cablevision Baton Rouge, threatened to drop the station from the lineup, so Jenkins ran PSAs encouraging viewers to lobby to keep the station on the air. This, coupled with support from then-Governor Mike Foster kept the station on the air. In September 1999, cable-only WZUP became Baton Rouge's primary UPN affiliate; however, KBTR continued to air some programming from the network, primarily during the daytime. In 2001, KBTR affiliated with UATV and remained an affiliate of that network until it ceased operations in 2006. When White Knight Broadcasting (owner of WZUP) sought to extend its signal over the air in 2002, it purchased the channel 19 allocation from Jenkins to broadcast WZUP (rechristened KZUP) over the air; Jenkins moved KBTR to channel 41 during that time as well, a channel he licensed but had not used. During April 2003, Cox Communications removed the station from the cable lineup in favor of KPBN-LP, ironically a station launched from one of KBTR's former translators, yet Jenkins was able to lobby again to keep the station on cable.

Most of the former translator stations now broadcast other programming. K65EF is now WBRL, Baton Rouge's CW affiliate; W19AW is KZUP, an independent station in Baton Rouge; K07UJ is now KPBN-LD, a sportsman channel affiliated with America One and several other sportsman networks; W39AT became WSTY-LP (channel 23), a My Family TV affiliate for Hammond; K13VE is currently silent.

In 2005, Jenkins and Great Oaks Broadcasting sold the station to Veritas Broadcasting Company, who also purchased WSTY-LP in Hammond. In late Summer 2007, Veritas Broadcasting, sold the station to the Manship family, owners of WBRZ and The Advocate newspaper in order to concentrate on running WSTY-LP. This secured the station's place on area cable systems, since the Manships now had the option to require cable systems to carry WBTR as part of the must-carry compensation for carrying WBRZ.

KBTR continues to broadcast syndicated reruns and local programming catered to the Baton Rouge market. From 1991 until 2013, Baton Rouge Today, a news program covering local and state issues, has aired on the station. This program won 1st place as the Best Community News Program in the U.S. from the Community Broadcasters Association. WBTR also airs sporting events from St. Amant High School in Ascension Parish and the Southland Conference, as well as Newsbeat and Sports Showtime from LSU's Tiger TV, and rebroadcasts of WBRZ's News 2 newscast. In September 2012, the station took a secondary affiliation with This TV, which was previously on a subchannel of WVLA. This TV programming mostly aired overnight during the week, while it had aired nonstop on WVLA 33.2 previously. In August 2017, KBTR began simulcasting WBRZ's news and weather channels on 41.2 and 41.3, respectively and in September 2017, WBRZ removed the weather feed from channel 2.3, making KBTR's channel 41.3, the exclusive channel for the weather feed. In June 2020, due to the relocation of channels higher than 37, KBTR moved its virtual and on-air channels from 41 to 36. In August 2023, KBTR removed the redundant WBRZ news feed from channel 36.2 and replaced it with a full, uninterrupted feed of This TV, allowing the network to be seen in its entirety for the first time since it originally aired on WVLA. Upon the closure of This TV in late May 2024, KBTR reverted to being an independent station, airing a mixture of infomercials, syndicated programming, WBRZ news rebroadcasts, and VSiN on its main feed and returning its second subchannel as a rebroadcast of WBRZ's news feed.

One of its former news directors is Tony Perkins, who now heads the Family Research Council.

== Hurricane Gustav ==
As Hurricane Gustav made landfall on the Louisiana coastline during Labor Day weekend 2008, the station was used to simulcast New Orleans' WDSU-TV (channel 6) for evacuees heading to Baton Rouge. The two stations had a similar carriage agreement during Hurricane Katrina three years earlier.

== Subchannels ==
The station's signal is multiplexed:

Subchannels of KBTR-CD
Subchannel	Res.	Short name	Programming
36.1	720p	WBTR-HD	Main KBTR-CD programming
36.2	480i	NEWS	WBRZ Plus (WBRZ-TV)
36.3	480i	WX	WBRZ Weather
