= List of television stations in Louisiana =

This is a list of broadcast television stations that are licensed in the U.S. state of Louisiana.

== Full-power ==
- Stations are arranged by media market served and channel position.

Full-power television stations in Louisiana
Media market	Station	Channel	Primary affiliation(s)	Notes	Refs
Alexandria	KALB-TV	5	NBC, CBS on 5.2, The CW on 5.3		
Alexandria	KLPA-TV	25	PBS	(Note: Satellite of WLPB-TV.)	
Alexandria	KLAX-TV	31	ABC		
Alexandria	KBCA	41	Heroes & Icons		
Baton Rouge	WBRZ-TV	2	ABC		
Baton Rouge	WAFB	9	CBS, MyNetworkTV on 9.4		
Baton Rouge	WLPB-TV	27	PBS		
Baton Rouge	WVLA-TV	33	NBC		
Baton Rouge	WGMB-TV	44	Fox, The CW on 44.2		
Lafayette	KATC	3	ABC		
Lafayette	KPLC	7	NBC, The CW on 7.2	(Note: Licensed to Lake Charles, Louisiana.)	
Lafayette	KLFY-TV	10	CBS, The CW on 10.2		
Lafayette	KADN-TV	15	Fox, NBC on 15.2, MyNetworkTV on 15.3		
Lafayette	KLTL-TV	18	PBS		
Lafayette	KLPB-TV	24	PBS		
Lafayette	KLWB	50	MeTV, Telemundo on 50.3	(Note: Licensed to New Iberia, Louisiana.)	
Monroe	KNOE-TV	8	CBS, ABC on 8.2		
Monroe	KMLU	11	MeTV	(Note: Licensed to Minden, Louisiana.)	
Monroe	KLTM-TV	13	PBS		
Monroe	KARD	14	Fox, The CW on 14.2	(Note: Licensed to West Monroe, Louisiana.)	
Monroe	KMCT-TV	39	Religious Independent		
New Orleans	WWL-TV	4	CBS		
New Orleans	WDSU	6	NBC		
New Orleans	WVUE-DT	8	Fox		
New Orleans	WYES-TV	12	PBS		
New Orleans	WHNO	20	CTN		
New Orleans	WGNO	26	ABC		
New Orleans	WLAE-TV	32	Educational independent		
New Orleans	WNOL-TV	38	The CW		
New Orleans	KGLA-DT	42	Telemundo	(Note: Licensed to Hammond, Louisiana.)	
New Orleans	WPXL-TV	49	Ion Television		
New Orleans	WUPL	54	MyNetworkTV	(Note: Licensed to Slidell, Louisiana.)	
Shreveport	KTBS-TV	3	ABC		
Shreveport	KSLA	12	CBS		
Shreveport	KPXJ	21	The CW		
Shreveport	KLTS-TV	24	PBS		
Shreveport	KMSS-TV	33	Fox		
Shreveport	KSHV-TV	45	MyNetworkTV		
~Beaumont, TX	KVHP	29	Fox, ABC on 29.2		

== Low-power ==
Low-power television stations in Louisiana
Media market	Station	Channel	Primary affiliation(s)	Notes	Refs
Alexandria	K04SA-D	4	Various		
Alexandria	K22OW-D	22	[Blank]		
Alexandria	KLGC-LD	25	The CW		
Alexandria	K29NX-D	29	Various		
Baton Rouge	KPBN-LD	14	SonLife		
Baton Rouge	KZUP-CD	20	Independent		
Baton Rouge	WBRL-CD	21	The CW		
Baton Rouge	KWBJ-CD	22	YTA TV	(Note: Licensed to Morgan City, Louisiana.)	
Baton Rouge	WLFT-CD	30	SonLife		
Baton Rouge	KBTR-CD	36	Independent		
Baton Rouge	WBXH-CD	39	MyNetworkTV		
Baton Rouge	K27NB-D	43	Various		
Baton Rouge	K29LR-D	47	Various		
Baton Rouge	W31EL-D	48	Daystar		
Baton Rouge	WRUG-LD	50	Various		
Lafayette	KLAF-LD	14	NBC		
Lafayette	KSWL-LD	17	CBS		
Lafayette	KAJN-CD	19	Religious independent		
Lafayette	K21OM-D	20	Various		
Lafayette	KDCG-CD	22	Heroes & Icons	(Note: Licensed to Opelousas, Louisiana.)	
Lafayette	KXKW-LD	32	Various		
Monroe	KCWL-LD	40	Gulf Coast SEN		
Monroe	K29NC-D	45	Various		
New Orleans	WTNO-CD	22	Various		
New Orleans	KNLD-LD	28	Daystar		
New Orleans	KFOL-CD	30	Independent	(Note: Licensed to Houma, Louisiana.)	
New Orleans	WQDT-LD	33	Various		
New Orleans	KNOV-CD	41	Tourist info		
New Orleans	K20MM-D	47	HSN		
Shreveport	KTSH-CD	19	Telemundo, CBS on 19.5		
Shreveport	KVPO-LD	30	Various		
Shreveport	KADO-CD	40	Daystar		
Shreveport	K27NA-D	42	TBN		
Shreveport	K30QB-D	47	HSN		
~Beaumont, TX	KWWE-LD	19	MeTV		
~Beaumont, TX	KGCH-LD	32	Gulf Coast SEN		

== Translators ==
Television station translators in Louisiana
Media market	Station	Channel	Translating	Notes	Refs
Alexandria	K30QG-D	47	WNTZ-TV		
Alexandria	K22NI-D	48	WNTZ-TV	(Note: Licensed to Leesville, Louisiana.)	
Baton Rouge	KJUN-CD	30	KFOL-CD		
Lafayette	KAGN-CD	31	KAJN-CD	(Note: Licensed to Crowley, Louisiana.)	
Lafayette	KNGC-LD	36	KPLC-TV	(Note: Licensed to Iowa, Louisiana.)	
Monroe	K12XQ-D	27	KNOE-TV		
New Orleans	WBXN-CD	18	WUPL		
~Beaumont, TX	K30QV-D	30	KSWL-LD; KWWE-LD		

== Defunct ==
- KFAZ-TV Monroe (1953–1954)
- KHMA Houma (1972–1974)
- KLNI-TV Lafayette (1968–1975)
- KLSE Monroe (1957–1964)
- KTAG-TV Lake Charles (1953–1961)
- KUZN-TV West Monroe (1967–1968)
- KYAY-TV West Monroe (1970–1971)
- WCCL New Orleans (1989–1990)
- WJMR-TV New Orleans (1953–1959)

== See also ==
- Louisiana § Media

== Bibliography ==
- "United States TV Stations: Louisiana", Yearbook of Radio and Television, New York: Radio Television Daily, 1964, OCLC 7469377 – via Internet Archive
