= KWWE-LD =

Television station in Lake Charles, Louisiana

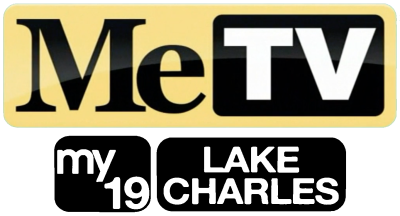

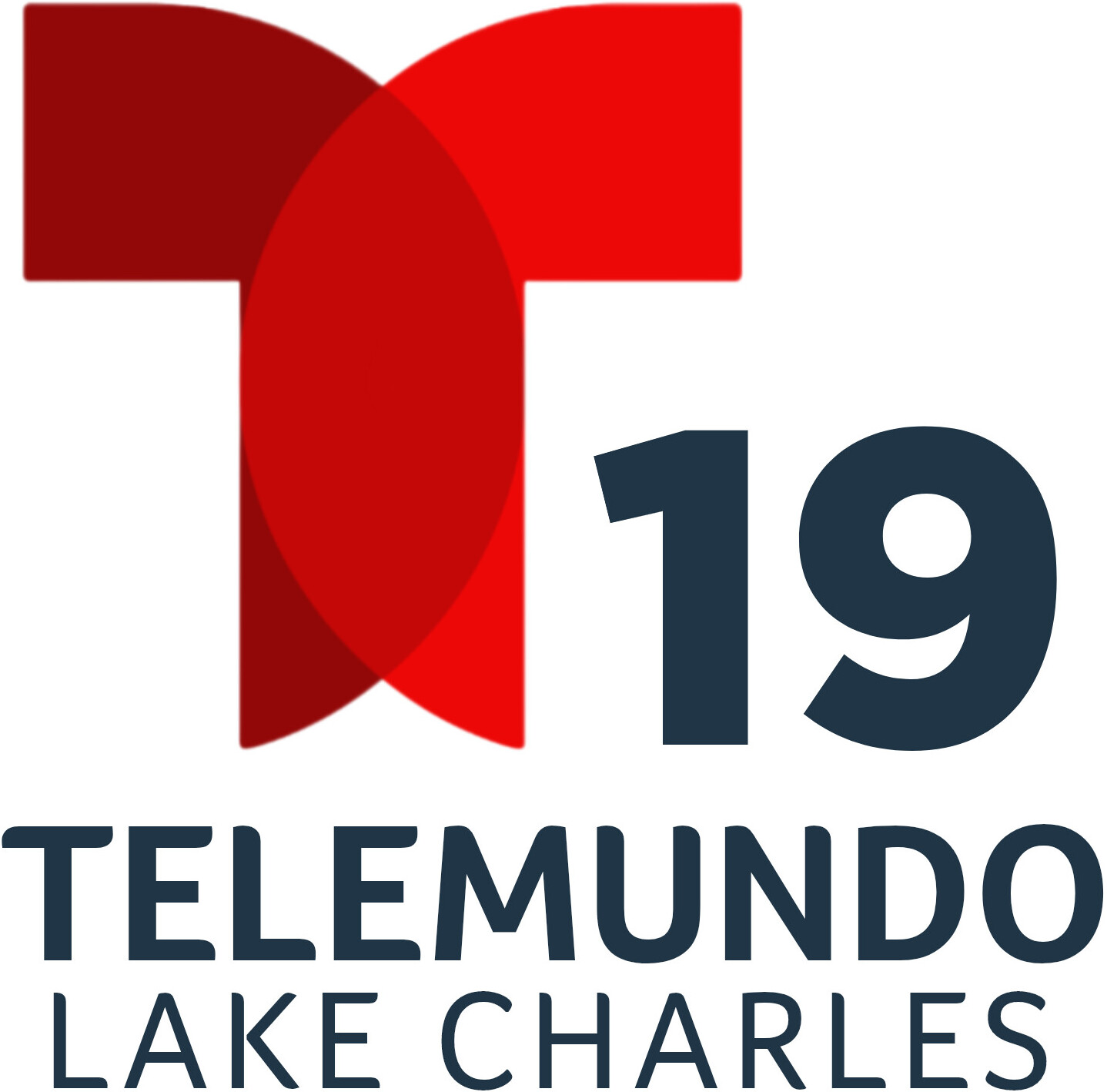
- Lake Charles, Louisiana; United States
- Channels: Digital: 19 (UHF); Virtual: 19
- Branding: MeTV & My 19 Lake Charles

Programming
- Affiliations: 19.1: MeTV/MyNetworkTV; 19.2: Telemundo; for others, see § Subchannels

Ownership
- Owner: SagamoreHill Broadcasting; (SagamoreHill Lake Charles, LLC)
- Sister stations: KSWL-LD

History
- Founded: February 22, 2011
- First air date: March 2017
- Former call signs: K19JB-D (2011–2017)

Technical information
- Licensing authority: FCC
- Facility ID: 184601
- Class: LD
- ERP: 15 kW
- HAAT: 163.5 m (536 ft)
- Transmitter coordinates: 30°13′16.4″N 93°18′40.9″W

Links
- Public license information: LMS

KWWE-LD (channel 19) is a low-power television station in Lake Charles, Louisiana, United States, affiliated with MeTV, MyNetworkTV, and Telemundo. It is owned by SagamoreHill Broadcasting alongside CBS affiliate KSWL-LD (channel 17). The two stations share studios on West Prien Lake Road in Lake Charles; KWWE-LD's transmitter is located at the KTSR tower in Westlake.

== History ==
Although granted a construction permit by the Federal Communications Commission (FCC) on February 22, 2011, the station did not make it to air for another six years or so. The permit was granted under the assigned callsign of K19JB-D. It was originally owned by DTV America of Sunrise, Florida.

In February 2017, the permit for K19JB-D was sold to Lake Charles Television, LLC, a unit of Waypoint Media, which signed on CBS affiliate KSWL-LD in the same month.

The callsign was changed to the current KWWE-LD on February 7, 2017. The following month, KWWE-LD signed on as the area's first MyNetworkTV affiliate, with some syndicated programming surrounding the network's prime time schedule. Prior to this, KADN-DT3 in Lafayette (and its sister station and now-NBC affiliate KLAF-LD prior to that) served as the market's default MyNetworkTV affiliate. KWWE-LD's sign-on also left ABC as the only major network not available on a local outlet in the Lake Charles area (Lafayette's KATC-TV and/or Beaumont, Texas–based KBMT served as Lake Charles' default ABC affiliates until August 31, 2017, when Fox affiliate KVHP launched an ABC affiliate on its second subchannel.

In addition to MyNetworkTV programming, KWWE-LD also serves as the Lake Charles market's MeTV affiliate, filling in programming for all time slots outside of the MyNetworkTV programming schedule with the MeTV schedule. Initially shown by itself on its LD2 subchannel, MeTV programming has since moved to KWWE-LD's main channel and was replaced on LD2 with a simulcast of KSWL-LD. In 2019, the station added Telemundo to its third subchannel.

On December 31, 2019, SagamoreHill Broadcasting acquired the station from Waypoint Media.

== Subchannels ==
The station's signal is multiplexed:

Subchannels of KWWE-LD
Subchannel	Res.	Short name	Programming
19.1	720p	KWWE-LD	MeTV (primary); MyNetworkTV (secondary)
19.2	1080i	Telemun	Telemundo
19.3	480i	Sonlife	SonLife
19.5	480i	JTV	Jewelry TV
