= KALB-TV =

Television station in Alexandria, Louisiana

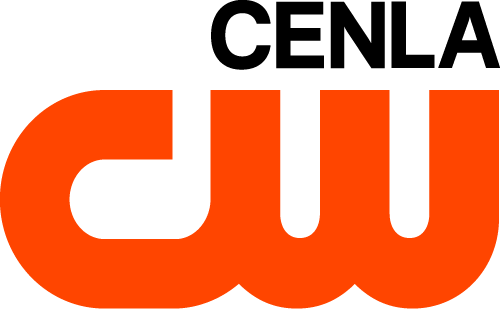
- Alexandria, Louisiana; United States
- Channels: Digital: 35 (UHF); Virtual: 5
- Branding: KALB; NewsChannel 5 Cenla CW (5.3)

Programming
- Affiliations: 5.1: NBC; 5.2: CBS; 5.3: CW+; for others, see § Subchannels

Ownership
- Owner: Gray Media; (Gray Television Licensee, LLC)

History
- First air date: September 29, 1954
- Former channel number: Analog: 5 (VHF, 1954–2009)
- Former affiliations: All secondary: DuMont (1954–1955); ABC (1954–1982); CBS (1954–1957); PBS (per program, 1970–1971)
- Call sign meaning: Know Alexandria, Louisiana Better

Technical information
- Licensing authority: FCC
- Facility ID: 51598
- ERP: 820 kW
- HAAT: 481 m (1,578 ft)
- Transmitter coordinates: 31°2′16″N 92°29′45″W
- Translator(s): KLGC-LD (25.1 for 5.3 CW+)

Links
- Public license information: Public file; LMS
- Website: www.kalb.com

KALB-TV (channel 5) is a television station in Alexandria, Louisiana, United States, affiliated with NBC, CBS and The CW Plus. Owned by Gray Media, the station maintains studios on Washington Street in downtown Alexandria, and its transmitter is located in Forest Hill.

== History ==
KALB began broadcasting on September 29, 1954, with NBC's airing of the 1954 World Series. It aired an analog signal on VHF channel 5. The station has been an NBC affiliate since its inception, although it also carried programs from the classic big four networks, until DuMont folded in 1955 and cable penetration in the early 1960s provided various network affiliates from Lafayette, Baton Rouge, Shreveport, and even Monroe. The original owners were W. H. Allen and Shreveport businessman T. B. Lanford. In 1957, Lanford purchased Allen's stake in the station as well as its radio partners, and he owned it via his company, Red River Valley Broadcasting, making KALB a sister station to fellow NBC affiliate KPLC in Lake Charles (which coincidentally signed on the same day as KALB) until that station was sold in 1964. KALB also aired programming from ABC, such as Happy Days, on a secondary basis from 1954 until the early 1980s, shortly before independent station (and future ABC affiliate) KLAX-TV (channel 31) signed on. Furthermore, KALB also aired Sesame Street for a brief period of time from December 1970 until December 1971; the show was removed to much viewer backlash, but over-the-air viewers could receive the program via WBRZ and later KLTM prior to KLPA's sign on.

The station was a major beneficiary of a quirk in the FCC's plan for allocating stations. In the early days of broadcast television, there were twelve VHF channels available and 69 UHF channels (later reduced to 55 in 1983). The VHF bands were more desirable because they carried longer distances. Since there were only twelve VHF channels available, there were limitations as to how closely the stations could be spaced.

After the FCC's Sixth Report and Order ended the license freeze and opened the UHF band in 1952, it devised a plan for allocating VHF licenses. Under this plan, almost all of the country would be able to receive two commercial VHF channels plus one noncommercial channel. Most of the rest of the country ("1/2") would be able to receive a third VHF channel. Other areas would be designated as "UHF islands" since they were too close to larger cities for VHF service. The "2" networks became CBS and NBC, "+1" represented non-commercial educational stations, and "1/2" became ABC (which was the weakest network usually winding up with the UHF allocation where no VHF was available).

However, Alexandria was sandwiched between Shreveport (channels 3, 6, and 12) and Monroe–El Dorado (channels 8, 10, and 13) to the north, Lafayette (channels 3 and 10), Lake Charles (channel 7), and Baton Rouge (channels 2 and 9) to the south, Northwestern Mississippi (channel 6), New Orleans (channels 4, 6, 8, and 12), Houma–Morgan City southwest of New Orleans and their now-defunct channel 11, and Jackson (channels 3 and 12) to the east. This created a large "doughnut" in Central Louisiana where there could be only one VHF license. (When cable arrived in the market in the 1970s, companies supplemented the area with stations from cities immediately surrounding the doughnut.) KALB was fortunate enough to gain that license, and consequently was the only television station to be based in Alexandria until KLAX and KLPA (channel 25) signed on in 1983.

KALB began broadcasting in stereo on November 28, 1986. Park Communications purchased KALB in 1993 and merged with Media General in 1997. KALB was Media General's first station west of the Mississippi River and the only station to hold that title until its purchase of Spartan Communications in 2000. On September 29, 1997, KALB began calling itself "Newschannel 5" and adopted a logo modeled after that company's flagship station, WFLA. The station launched its digital signal in 2002.

Regnal Wallace, the late public relations director of the Louisiana Farm Bureau Federation who created the television series This Week in Louisiana Agriculture, was from 1962 to 1969 a sportscaster at KALB.

From 1960 to 1966, Leverne Perry (1932–2016) hosted KALB's Leverne Perry and the Little Wranglers. He organized the Horses and Handicaps Program and was active in area rodeo events. He owned an Alexandria shoe store, was an elected member and former president of the Rapides Parish Police Jury, and in 1987 became the executive director of the Louisiana Quarter Horse Breeders Association.

In January 2007, KALB launched a CBS affiliate on its second subchannel, then branded as CBS Alexandria. This gave Central Louisiana full service programming from the Big Four networks for the first time. Prior to that, CBS programming was provided on local cable by KLFY-TV in Lafayette, KNOE-TV in Monroe, or WAFB in Baton Rouge. The subchannel is now branded as CBS 2 given it is carried on Suddenlink channel 2 and also uses the fictitious callsign NALB. Suddenlink carried both NALB and KLFY in Alexandria before dropping the latter on May 1, 2015.

On October 29, 2007, Media General announced it was exploring the sale of KALB. On March 14, 2008, the company reached an agreement to sell the station and sister outlet WMBB in Panama City, Florida, to Hoak Media. The deal was closed on July 16. KALB continued to use elements of its Media General–era presentation while owned by Hoak Media, keeping the news theme until 2011 and versions of the arc logo until 2014 (KALB made slight modifications to its logo and news theme in July 2012 upon launching its newscasts in high definition) On February 17, 2009, it turned off its analog signal on channel 5 and now only operates in digital on channel 35. However, digital tuners show the virtual channel as the former analog channel.

Originally, KALB aired a digital signal from a transmitter at its facilities in Downtown Alexandria. KALB is one of the country's most dominant stations in part because it was the only commercial station in town until KLAX-TV signed-on in 1983.

On November 20, 2013, Hoak announced the sale of most of its stations, including KALB-TV, to Gray Television. The sale was completed on June 13, 2014. At the end of 2014, the station adopted its current logo; aside from continuing to refer to itself as Newschannel 5, KALB's on-air look no longer included elements from the era of Media General ownership.

=== CW affiliation ===
On December 15, 2015, Gray Television came to terms on an extension of their existing CW stations and subchannels throughout their chain; the press release announcing the extension also revealed Gray also agreed to place The CW on a new third digital subchannel of KALB-TV on September 12, 2016. This saw KBCA (channel 41) lose its affiliation at that time to KALB-DT3 after their existing agreement expired. In mid-2021, Gray launched a low powered station, K25PZ-D (digital channel 25, virtual channel 3, later virtual channel 25), to bring a high definition feed of the CW back to Central Louisiana after the network moved to KALB. The channel was originally simulcast in 720p high definition but was later upgraded to 1080i in late 2022; at the same time, K25PZ-D added a simulcast of Circle TV to the channel as did KALB-TV (the duplicate Circle TV feed was removed from K25PZ when the network ended its over the air feed). K25PZ-D changed its call sign to KLGC-LD on January 30, 2024 and now provides a 720p HD simulcast of KALB-DT4 (Gulf Coast SEN) on channel 25.2, along with a simulcast of KALB-DT7 (365BLK) on channel 25.3.

On December 30, 2023, KALB-TV parent company Gray Television announced it had reached an agreement with the New Orleans Pelicans to air 10 games on the station during the 2023–24 season.

On September 17, 2024, Gray and the Pelicans announced a broader deal to form the Gulf Coast Sports & Entertainment Network, which would broadcast nearly all 2024–25 Pelicans games on Gray's stations in the Gulf South, including KALB-TV.

== News operation ==
KALB operates a relatively large news department compared with other Big Three affiliates in markets of its size. This results in a higher-quality product than conventional wisdom would suggest for such a small market. It is one of the country's most dominant stations largely because it had the area more or less to itself until KLAX launched in 1983.

The Jambalaya morning newscast was expanded to a two-hour broadcast in January 2012. Unlike some NBC affiliates in the Central Time Zone, there is no early evening local newscast on Sundays. On weeknights, KALB-DT2 airs CBS 2 News Second Look with the CBS Evening News airing at 6 p.m. This is unlike most affiliates in the Central Time Zone, which normally air the broadcast at 5:30 p.m. The morning news/weather updates and weekend newscasts are simulcast on both CBS 2 and News Channel 5. The weekend broadcasts are co-branded with the title Weekend Edition.

During weather forecast segments, KALB features a live NOAA National Weather Service weather radar feed from a site on the south side of Alexandria International Airport. On-air, this is known as "Sky Warn 5 Live Doppler". Additionally, KALB has a partnership with Radio Maria, AM 580 KJMJ in Alexandria, to simulcast its newscasts during severe weather or other emergencies. KALB's meteorologists also provide daily weather updates for Radio Maria and its network of stations.

The station also produces numerous live and recorded locally originated programs such as live coverage of the Komen Alexandria Race for the Cure and live political debates during election season.

The 5th Quarter airs from 10:05 to 10:35 p.m. on Friday nights during high school football season, featuring highlights and scores from schools throughout Central Louisiana. The three also host the weekly show Sportsnite, recapping local and national sports news.

=== Notable former on-air staff ===
- Rob Johnson (last at WBBM-TV in Chicago)

== Technical information ==
=== Subchannels ===
The station's digital signal is multiplexed:

Subchannels of KALB-TV
Channel	Res.	Short name	Programming
5.1	1080i	KALBDT	NBC
5.2	720p	CBS	CBS
5.3	480i	CW	The CW Plus
5.4	480i	GSN	Gulf Coast SEN
5.5	480i	Grit	Grit
5.6	480i	Oxygen	Oxygen
5.7	480i	THE365	365BLK

Beginning in October 2024, KALB's fourth subchannel has been affiliated with the Gray Television owned Gulf Coast SEN. The network is the television home of the New Orleans Pelicans of the National Basketball Association.

Subchannels of KLGC-LD
Subchannel	Res.	Short name	Programming
25.1	1080i	CW	The CW Plus (KALB-DT3) in HD
25.2	720p	GSN	Gulf Coast SEN (KALB-DT4) in HD
25.3	480i	THE365	365BLK (KALB-DT7)

Simulcast of subchannels of another station

== See also ==
- Channel 5 virtual TV stations in the United States
- Channel 35 digital TV stations in the United States
