= NBC 15 =

NBC 15 may refer to one of the following television stations in the United States:

== Current affiliates ==
- KADN-DT2, in Lafayette, Louisiana
- KYOU-DT2, in Ottumwa, Iowa
- WBTS-CD, in Nashua, New Hampshire / Boston, Massachusetts (O&O) (branded as NBC 10 Boston)
- WEAR-DT2, a digital subchannel of WEAR-TV in Pensacola, Florida / Mobile, Alabama (branded as NBC 15)
- WMTV, in Madison, Wisconsin
- WTAP-TV, in Parkersburg, West Virginia

== Formerly affiliated ==
- KLNI (now KADN-TV), in Lafayette, Louisiana (1968–1976)
- KOGG in Wailuku, Hawaii (1995 to 2009), a former satellite of KHNL
- PJA-TV, in Oranjestad, Aruba (was branded as 15 ATV and broadcast on analog channel 8 from 1996 to 2016)
- WICD (TV), in Champaign, Illinois (1959–2005)
- WOWL-TV (now WHDF), in Florence, Alabama (1957–1999)
- WPMI-TV, in Mobile, Alabama / Pensacola, Florida (1996–2025)
- WVEC-TV, in Hampton, Virginia (1953–1958)
