= KLNI-TV =

Television station in Lafayette–New Iberia, Louisiana (1968–1975)

- Lafayette–New Iberia, Louisiana; United States
- Channels: Analog: 15 (UHF)

Programming
- Affiliations: NBC

Ownership
- Owner: Southwest Louisiana Communications, Inc.

History
- First air date: September 16, 1968
- Last air date: February 21, 1975
- Call sign meaning: Lafayette/New Iberia

Technical information
- ERP: 1,585 kW
- HAAT: 490 ft (149 m)
- Transmitter coordinates: 30°02′54″N 91°59′49″W

KLNI-TV (channel 15) was a television station licensed to both Lafayette and New Iberia, Louisiana, United States. It broadcast from September 16, 1968, to February 21, 1975, and throughout its existence served as the NBC affiliate for the Lafayette area; the station closed due to financial difficulties. KLNI-TV broadcast from studios on the Evangeline Thruway in Broussard, halfway between the two towns, and a transmitter near Youngsville.

== History ==
The Federal Communications Commission (FCC) granted Southwest Louisiana Communications, Inc. a construction permit for a new commercial television station on channel 15 in September 1967. The permit was awarded on a 4–2 FCC vote; two commissioners dissented because of minimum mileage spacing concerns to a channel 14 allocation at Morgan City. Construction proceeded quickly, and KLNI-TV went on air a year later, on September 16, 1968. A week later, Leif Erickson, then the lead in NBC's The High Chaparral, was the featured guest at the station's open house. KLNI-TV operated from the first color-designed television studios in the state of Louisiana, which featured a viewing room to allow the public to watch program production and an outdoor patio for shows and commercials.

Channel 15 brought full NBC network service to Lafayette for the first time; previously, no NBC station put a Grade A signal into central Acadiana. KLNI-TV also aired Sesame Street beginning in 1970, as Lafayette was not served by a public television station at the time; this was also done by a number of commercial stations elsewhere in places that likewise did not have access to PBS then. However, channel 15 faced an uphill climb as a UHF outlet in a television market that had two VHF stations (KATC and KLFY-TV); long-ingrained viewing habits for those channels and, in some cases, the lack of UHF-compatible sets impeded KLNI-TV's progress, as was the case elsewhere in the country then with UHF startups in previously all-VHF markets. In 1969, the station filed an unsuccessful protest with the FCC when then-NBC affiliate WBRZ-TV in Baton Rouge sought to increase its tower height, saying it would cause a signal overlap for over 82,000 people, up from 5,300. In 1970, the station sued the American Research Bureau (ARB) ratings agency, seeking $625,000 in damages for having been wrongfully dropped from the November 1969 ARB survey; KLNI-TV claimed the omission caused a loss of advertising income and damaged its reputation. When KPLC in Lake Charles and WBRZ activated taller towers in 1970 and 1971, respectively, the western and eastern parts of Acadiana began receiving Grade B coverage from VHF NBC affiliates, a direct assault on the fledgling KLNI-TV.

In 1970, Charles A. Castille, former president of a chain of pharmacies in the Lafayette area, bought stock in Southwestern Louisiana Communications; he was also elected president of the board. In November 1974, Castille was elected to the Louisiana Board of Elementary and Secondary Education; his opponent in that election believed a recall petition could be made against him because, among other allegations, he believed Castille was about to try to sell KLNI-TV to the state to reduce his debt. At that time, KLNI-TV was described as "financially troubled". On February 21, 1975, channel 15 went dark: while it cited technical issues in the immediate aftermath of going silent, it noted "severe financial troubles" as the reason for its cessation of operations in an FCC filing. The three remaining board members, not including Castille, then actually made an attempt to sell the facility to the state-owned Louisiana Educational Television Authority; the state network opted not to purchase the facility, citing technical limitations and noting it might have taken as long as two years to begin operating.

Channel 15 would not be used again in Lafayette until a new group activated it as KADN-TV, which began telecasting March 1, 1980. It would be more than 40 years before an NBC affiliate was launched again in the Lafayette market, when KLAF-LD affiliated with NBC on July 1, 2015.
