= KTAG-TV =

Television station in Lake Charles, Louisiana (1953–1961)

Lake Charles, Louisiana; United States
- Channels: Analog: 25 (UHF)

Programming
- Affiliations: CBS (1953–1961); ABC (secondary, 1953–1954); DuMont (secondary, 1953–1956)

Ownership
- Owner: Charles W. Lamar Stations; (KTAG Associates)

History
- First air date: November 15, 1953
- Last air date: August 3, 1961

Technical information
- ERP: 20.4 kW
- HAAT: 348 m (1,142 ft)

KTAG-TV (channel 25) was a television station in Lake Charles, Louisiana, United States. Owned by Charles W. Lamar of Baton Rouge, it was Lake Charles' first television station.

== History ==
Originally, the station was affiliated with CBS, ABC, and Dumont, but by 1957, it was solely a CBS affiliate, as Dumont folded and when KPLC-TV signed on in 1954, it took the ABC affiliation on a secondary basis.

With the sign-on of KPLC, KTAG was at a major disadvantage being a UHF station in a small market competing with a VHF. In 1955, the Charles W. Lamar estate petitioned the Federal Communications Commission for VHF channel 3 to move the station to that spot, but it was not granted, as Acadian Television Corporation of Lafayette also lobbied (and was eventually granted) for the channel. By the early 1960s, KTAG operated only five hours a day with a staff of only three people, and on August 3, 1961, it signed off. In 1962, KATC signed on as the ABC affiliate for Lafayette (and, by extension, Lake Charles) on KTAG's desired channel 3. CBS would not return to Lake Charles until KSWL-LD signed on February 15, 2017; prior to this, Lafayette's KLFY-TV and Beaumont's KFDM served as the CBS affiliates for the area. It was not until the 1980s that another UHF station signed on to serve the Lake Charles area (KLTL-TV [channel 18], a satellite of Louisiana Public Broadcasting, signed on in 1981; and KVHP [channel 29], which is now a Fox affiliate, signed on in 1983).
