= KPLC =

Television station in Lake Charles, Louisiana

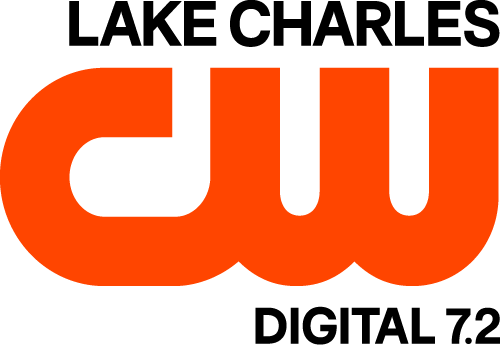
- Lake Charles, Louisiana; United States
- Channels: Digital: 7 (VHF); Virtual: 7
- Branding: KPLC 7; CW Lake Charles (7.2)

Programming
- Affiliations: 7.1: NBC; 7.2: CW+; for others, see § Subchannels

Ownership
- Owner: Gray Media; (Gray Television Licensee, LLC)
- Sister stations: KVHP

History
- First air date: September 29, 1954
- Former channel numbers: Analog: 7 (VHF, 1954–2009); Digital: 8 (VHF, until 2009)
- Former affiliations: ABC (secondary, 1954–1964)
- Call sign meaning: Port of Lake Charles

Technical information
- Licensing authority: FCC
- Facility ID: 13994
- ERP: 62 kW
- HAAT: 451 m (1,480 ft)
- Transmitter coordinates: 30°23′46″N 93°0′3″W
- Translator(s): KNGC-LD 36 Iowa

Links
- Public license information: Public file; LMS
- Website: www.kplctv.com

KPLC (channel 7) is a television station in Lake Charles, Louisiana, United States, affiliated with NBC and The CW Plus. It is owned by Gray Media alongside Fox/ABC/Univision affiliate KVHP (channel 29). The two stations share studios on Division Street in downtown Lake Charles; KPLC's transmitter is located near Fenton, Louisiana.

== History ==
KPLC-TV signed on September 29, 1954, with NBC's airing of the 1954 World Series. Owner T. B. Lanford of Shreveport had previously signed on KPLC radio (1470 AM) and was eager to expand into television, giving the new station the same call sign as its radio sister. On the same day, Lanford helped sign on then- and current sister station KALB-TV in Alexandria.

KPLC was a major beneficiary of a quirk in the Federal Communications Commission (FCC)'s plan for allocating stations. In the early days of broadcast television, there were twelve VHF channels available and 69 UHF channels (later reduced to 55 in 1983). The VHF bands were more desirable because they carried longer distances. Since there were only twelve VHF channels available, there were limitations as to how closely the stations could be spaced.

After the FCC's Sixth Report and Order ended the license freeze and opened the UHF band in 1952, it devised a plan for allocating VHF licenses. Under this plan, almost all of the country would be able to receive two commercial VHF channels plus one noncommercial channel. Most of the rest of the country ("1/2") would be able to receive a third VHF channel. Other areas would be designated as "UHF islands" since they were too close to larger cities for VHF service. The "2" networks became CBS and NBC, "+1" represented non-commercial educational stations, and "1/2" became ABC (which was the weakest network usually winding up with the UHF allocation where no VHF was available).

However, what would become of the Lake Charles market was sandwiched between Houston (channels 2, 8, 11 and 13), Beaumont–Port Arthur (channels 4, 6, and 12) and Lufkin (channel 9) to the west, Lafayette (channels 3 and 10), Baton Rouge (channels 2 and 9) and New Orleans (channels 4, 6, 8 and 12) to the east, and Alexandria (channel 5), Shreveport (channels 3, 6, and 12) and Monroe (channels 8, 10, and 13) to the north. This created a large "doughnut" in southwestern Louisiana where there could only be one VHF license. KPLC-TV was fortunate to gain that license and eventually became the only station to be based in Lake Charles when the market's original TV station, KTAG-TV (channel 25), went off the air due to being on the UHF frequency (before all-channel tuning was made mandatory on TVs in 1962) and unable to compete with KPLC in 1961. This changed in the early 1980s when LPB outlet KLTL (channel 18) signed on in 1981, and independent-turned-Fox affiliate KVHP (channel 29) signed on a year later.

In 1964, Lanford sold KPLC to a St. Louis group headed by investor Elliot Stien. He visited KPLC frequently along with his friend, St. Louis Cardinals baseball legend Stan Musial. Shortly after this sale, ABC programming began to disappear from the station's lineup, as then-recently launched stations KBMT in Beaumont provided a grade A signal to Lake Charles and Lafayette's KATC a grade B signal. Lanford continued to own fellow NBC affiliate KALB in Alexandria until 1993.

In 1970, G. Russell Chambers purchased KPLC-TV from the St. Louis group and dramatically increased the station's coverage by adding a 1,500-foot (460 m) tower, providing a quality signal for the NBC affiliate as far north as Leesville, as far east as Lafayette and to the Gulf of Mexico. FCC regulations required that the radio stations be sold. Perry Sanders purchased KPLC AM and KPLC-FM 99.5 and changed their call letters to KLCL. Chambers established a company, Calcasieu Television & Radio, Inc., to operate KPLC-TV.

On August 9, 1983, Chambers, acting both in his individual capacity and on behalf of CTR, entered into a purchase agreement to sell the station's facilities and broadcast license to respondent NASCO, Inc., for a purchase price of $18 million. The agreement was not recorded in the parishes in which the two properties housing the station's facilities were located. Consummation of the agreement was subject to the approval of the FCC; both parties were obligated to file the necessary documents with the FCC no later than September 23, 1983. By late August, however, Chambers had changed his mind and tried to talk NASCO out of consummating the sale. NASCO refused. On September 23, Chambers, through counsel, informed NASCO that he would not file the necessary papers with the FCC. In 1986, the U.S. District Court ordered Chambers to sell the station to NASCO, and the deal was consummated on August 26, 1986.

Less than two months after the sale of KPLC to NASCO, Cosmos Broadcasting, a subsidiary of Liberty Life Insurance Company, purchased the station and KAIT of Jonesboro, Arkansas, from NASCO. This resulted in KPLC becoming a sister station to New Orleans NBC affiliate and first Louisiana TV station WDSU until that station was sold in 1989. Within the next two years, the station adopted a circle 7 logo and its current slogan "7 at your service". KPLC was one of the first television stations in the U.S. to launch its own website in the 1990s.

In 2004, KPLC began broadcasting in digital as well as analog with the launch of KPLC-DT. Later in the year, the station launched its first local 24-hour weather channel, "KPLC WeatherPlus". Simultaneously, the station launched a service specifically for cellphones and PDAs, "7 On Your Cell".

In March 2004, while workers were installing a new transmission tower in high winds, the old transmission tower fell, causing a service disruption lasting about two weeks to over-the-air viewers in Southwest Louisiana. Service to cable customers was not interrupted due to the station's signal being delivered by fiber lines. A lower-power temporary tower was erected on top of the station's broadcast studios a couple of days after the tower fell, allowing viewers within a few miles of the station to again receive the signal over the air. KPLC was also simulcast on KJEF-CA in Jennings.

In January 2006, Liberty and KPLC were purchased by Raycom Media, which also owned two other Louisiana television stations, KSLA in Shreveport and WAFB in Baton Rouge.

In August 2012, KPLC started broadcasting in high definition with a new HD studio.

Until 2015, KPLC doubled as the default NBC affiliate for the Lafayette market, since that market did not have an NBC affiliate of its own. Before its purchase by Raycom, it even included Lafayette as one of the cities it served in station identifications. It operated a "virtual station" for Acadiana cable systems and sold advertising in the area. On July 1, 2015, KLAF-LD became Lafayette's first local NBC affiliate since KLNI-TV's shutdown in 1975, and local cable providers removed KPLC and Baton Rouge NBC affiliate WVLA-TV from channel lineups.

On August 31, 2017, KPLC's second subchannel became the market's CW affiliate. Virtual sister KVHP, which formerly operated as an affiliate of The CW Plus on its second subchannel, launched a new station, "SWLA ABC" on that day over KVHP 29.2, carrying ABC and syndicated programming. Grit, which formerly occupied DT2, was subsequently moved to a new fourth subchannel. By September 2017, the over-the-air signal of KPLC-DT2 had been upgraded into 720p 16:9 HD.

On June 25, 2018, Gray Television announced its intent to acquire Raycom for $3.65 billion. Coincidentally, in 1983, Gray attempted to purchase KPLC from Chambers at the same time NASCO considered purchasing the station. The sale was approved by the FCC on December 20 and completed on January 2, 2019.

On December 30, 2023, KPLC parent company Gray Television announced it had reached an agreement with the New Orleans Pelicans to air 10 games on the station during the 2023–24 season. On September 17, 2024, Gray and the Pelicans announced a broader deal to form the Gulf Coast Sports & Entertainment Network, which would broadcast nearly all 2024–25 Pelicans games on Gray's stations in the Gulf South, including KPLC.

=== Effects of Hurricanes Laura and Delta ===
KPLC and KVHP began 24-hour continuous coverage of Hurricane Laura on August 25, 2020, from their shared studio building, a few days after it provided some coverage of Hurricane Marco, which had affected Louisiana earlier that week; KPLC and KVHP were forced to relocate their operations to that of Baton Rouge sister station WAFB in the late afternoon hours of August 26, as mandatory evacuation orders had been issued for the city of Lake Charles ahead of the hurricane's landfall. When the hurricane made landfall in the early morning hours of August 27, both stations were forced off the air after their studio-to-transmitter-link tower collapsed onto the roof of their shared studio building and punctured a hole in the building's roof; the city's National Weather Service radar was also destroyed in the storm. Staff returned to the KPLC building on September 26; the anchor desk was moved to the station's newsroom. While KPLC was able to resume operations following the hurricane, KVHP remained dark due to a lack of an alternate transmitter; as a result, Fox provided a Foxnet-like feed to cable companies in Southwestern Louisiana for a temporary period until KVHP resumed full operations at the end of 2020.

== News operation ==
KPLC presently broadcasts 27 hours of locally produced newscasts each week (with five hours each weekday and two hours each on Saturdays and Sundays).

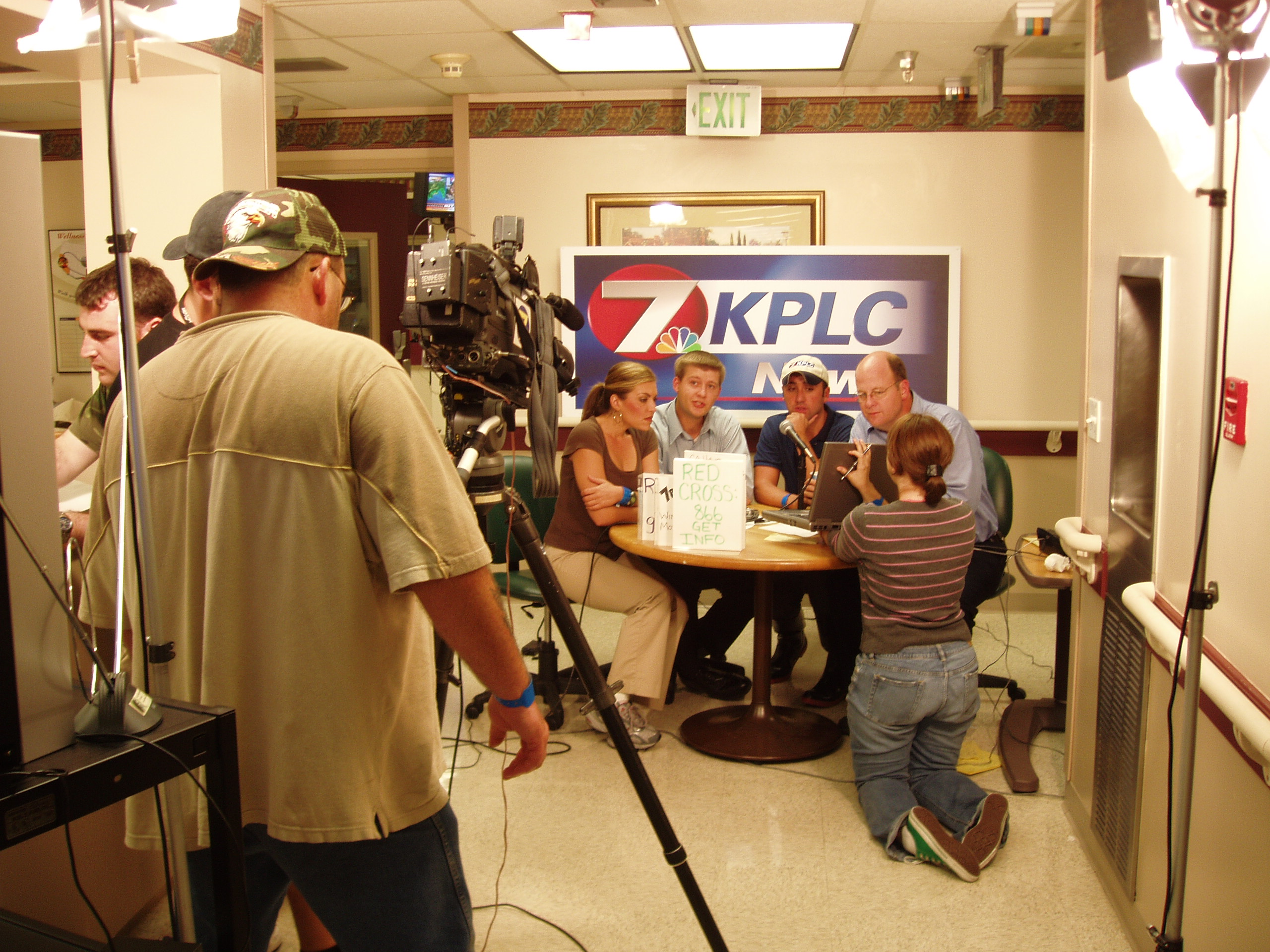
KPLC's makeshift studio during Hurricane Rita coverage

During Hurricane Rita, which struck in September 2005, the station delivered around-the-clock news from a temporary, makeshift studio in a safer location than its normal studios in downtown Lake Charles. Similarly, during Hurricane Laura in August 2020, the station evacuated to the studios of sister station WAFB in Baton Rouge. At the time, KPLC's tower ripped and partially collapsed during the storm.

=== Notable former on-air staff ===
- Rob Marciano – chief meteorologist (1994–1997)
- Bonnie Schneider – meteorologist

== Technical information ==
=== Subchannels ===
The station's signal is multiplexed:

Subchannels of KPLC
Subchannel	Res.	Short name	Programming
7.1	1080i	KPLC-DT	NBC
7.2	720p	CW	The CW Plus
7.3	480i	Bounce	Bounce TV
7.4	480i	Grit	Grit
7.5	480i	DABL	Dabl
7.6	480i	MYSTERY	Ion Mystery
7.7	480i	365BLK	365BLK

Subchannel broadcast with MPEG-4 video

=== Analog-to-digital conversion ===
KPLC shut down its analog signal, over VHF channel 7, on June 12, 2009, the official date on which full-power television stations in the United States transitioned from analog to digital broadcasts under federal mandate. The station's digital signal relocated from its pre-transition VHF channel 8 to channel 7 for post-transition operations.

=== Translators ===
In 2021, KPLC launched two UHF translators, K36QM (now KNGC-LD) in Iowa and K32PB (now KGCH-LD) in western Calcasieu Parish between Starks and Vinton to help strengthen its signal along Interstate 10 and Lake Charles' southwestern suburbs and into Lafayette to the east (with KNGC-LD's signal covering that city). KGCH-LD and KNGC-LD's main channels serve as affiliates of Gray Media's Gulf Coast Sports & Entertainment Network.
