= LDMA =

LDMA may refer to:

- Linked direct memory access, a type of direct memory access controllers
- Louisiana Digital Media Archive, an archive containing the state archives' multimedia and public broadcasting collections
- Lost Dutchman's Mining Association, see Stanton, Arizona
- Left-Democratic Manch, Assam, see Revolutionary Communist Party of India
