= Bill Elder (newscaster) =

American journalist (1938–2003)

William Stanley Elder Jr. (January 28, 1938 – September 17, 2003) was an anchor and investigative reporter for WWL-TV, the CBS-affiliated television station in New Orleans, from July 1966 to February 2000, nicknamed the "Mike Wallace of Louisiana" because of his hard-hitting stories.

== Career ==
Elder graduated with an English degree from the University of Southwestern Louisiana and worked for two newspapers, the Daily World in his hometown of Opelousas and The Daily Advertiser in Lafayette. He then moved to television at Lafayette station KATC.

In 1966, Elder was hired by WWL-TV, where he would remain for nearly 34 years. His hiring came after WWL's equipment broke down on the way to Lafayette to conduct an interview, Elder offered his and impressed management. In addition to reporting, Elder anchored the station's noon and 5 p.m. local newscasts. In 1979, Elder defused a hostage situation at the Louisiana Superdome where a disgruntled employee had taken his boss hostage and held her at knifepoint; Elder convinced the hostage-taker to drop his weapon and surrender.

His investigative reports, which included a 1971 exposé of the Orleans Parish Prison, won several Edward R. Murrow Awards; a 26-part series, "Facing Reality", uncovered drug use and sexual misconduct at a drug patient facility and earned him a Peabody Award, the fifth in the history of WWL-TV.

Elder was diagnosed with brain cancer in 1998 and took a leave of absence for surgery (which removed the cancer); his recovery was documented in a series of reports aired by WWL-TV. While he eventually returned to the anchor desk, his speech and memory were impaired, and he retired in February 2000. Complications from radiation treatment led to his death on September 17, 2003; he was survived by a wife and three sons.
