= Louisiana Digital Media Archive =

The Louisiana Digital Media Archive (LDMA) is an archive containing both the Louisiana State Archives' Multimedia Collection and the Louisiana Public Broadcasting (LPB) Digital Collection. It endeavors to preserve as well as provide public access to both collections. The LDMA is the first media collections collaboration between an American state archives and a public broadcaster. It also contributes to the American Archive of Public Broadcasting. The LDMA contains thousands of hours of media documenting over 50 years of Louisiana history, including glimpses of the state's endangered and remote communities and locales as well as interviews with notable Louisianians, such as artists, civil rights activists, military personnel, politicians, and writers.

== History ==
The history of the LDMA began with a report on archival media deterioration in Louisiana commissioned by LPB in 2005, which ultimately recommended that the broadcaster work collaboratively with other media collections in the state in order to preserve and enable access to Louisiana's historic recorded media. In 2009, LPB joined the Corporation for Public Broadcasting's American Archive Initiative, a national effort to catalog, preserve, and enable access to content produced by public broadcasters in the United States. As a result of this project's grant funding, LPB was able to inventory over 20,000 videotapes as well as digitize more than 500 hours of content. LPB and the LDMA have subsequently contributed digitized audiovisual recordings to the American Archive of Public Broadcasting, a joint initiative of the Library of Congress and WGBH Educational Foundation.

In 2010, LPB and the State Archives together received a $96,600 National Leadership Grant from the Institute of Museum and Library Services (IMLS) for the purpose of designing the LDMA. With the grant, LPB and the State Archives were able to develop best practices, policies, and procedures for access, acquisition, digitization, intellectual control, preservation, and safe handling of their physical media, which have in the process become a "national model for media archiving". Among the LDMA's best practices are its creation of two sets of digital files for each physical video, a high-quality file for broadcasts and a lower-quality one for online use, and its adoption of the PBCore audiovisual standards.

After five years of design and construction, the LDMA was officially launched to the public on January 20, 2015. At its launch, it contained over 1,500 digitized videos, with plans to add thousands more in the years to come; at the time, LPB and the State Archives held approximately 40,000 archival videos in total. The collection is intended to grow continually. The LDMA is also the first media collections collaboration between an American state archives and a public broadcaster. Aside from providing public access to its content, another core mission of the LDMA is to preserve its archival media collections, from inherent vice as well as the Louisiana climate, particularly its humidity and Gulf storms such as hurricanes.

At the official launch announcement, Secretary of State Tom Schedler described the LDMA as a place to "watch history unfold from the past", while LPB president and CEO Beth Courtney noted the potential of the collections to be "powerful tools in education". By February 2015, almost 40,000 teachers had registered to use education content that was contributed by LPB. According to LPB archivist Leslie Bourgeois, the two main audiences for the LDMA are K–12 students and the general public. The site's users are able to browse the collections by television series as well as by topic. Users are able to stream videos on the LDMA's website; while at launch they were not able to download them, it is expected that select videos will eventually become available for download.

Aside from continuing to increase the size of its collections, future goals for the LDMA include achieving project sustainability, continuing to obtain grants, securing donations, and courting potential partner institutions, such as historical societies.

== Collections ==
The LDMA contains both the Louisiana State Archives Multimedia Collection and the LPB Digital Collection, and it endeavors to preserve as well as provide public access to both collections. It contains thousands of hours of media documenting over 50 years of Louisiana history, including glimpses of the state's endangered and remote communities and locales as well as interviews with several notable Louisianians, such as artists, civil rights activists, military personnel, politicians, and writers. Individual people featured in the collections include Stephen E. Ambrose, Ruby Bridges, Jim Garrison, Archbishop Philip Hannan, Pete Maravich, Governor John McKeithen, Lee Harvey Oswald, and Mayor Victor H. Schiro. State governors are particularly well represented, from Earl Long to Bobby Jindal, as are Mayors of New Orleans, from Chep Morrison to Mitch Landrieu. Schedler described the LDMA's coverage of politics as extending "all the way...back to Huey Long". A number of hurricanes that impacted Louisiana, including Audrey, Betsy, and Camille, are also featured subjects.

LPB contributed over forty years worth of television programs to the LDMA, including cooking shows, documentaries, and public affairs as well as news content; among them is "Louisiana: The State We're In," the longest-running statewide news magazine in the country. Other LPB shows in the LDMA include "Louisiana Public Square" and the six-part series "Louisiana: A History". The State Archives' contribution to the LDMA consisted of media collections from numerous broadcasters in Louisiana, including historic stations such as KLFY-TV in Lafayette, WBRZ-TV in Baton Rouge, and WWL-TV in New Orleans; the WWL collection in the LDMA comprises numerous clips from its sign-on in 1957 to its transition to videotape in 1978. Other archival materials contributed by the State Archives include campaign commercials, newsreels, and oral history interviews. Included among the oral history collection are interviews with civil rights activists Avery Alexander, Revius Ortique, Jr., John Minor Wisdom, and J. Skelly Wright.
