= Louisiana State Archive and Research Library =

Coordinates: 30.414461°N 91.097331°W

The Louisiana State Archives, established 1956, is the agency under the Secretary of State of Louisiana "designated to fulfill the function of directing a program of collecting, preserving, and making available for use the state's historical records" Located in Baton Rouge, Louisiana, the archives house records from the Spanish, French, and early American past of the state, including vital records, immigration, military, and legislative documents ranging back into the 18th century. The five-panel facade on the building, sculpted by Baton Rouge artist Al Lavergne, offers a panoramic "study in stone" of Louisiana's unique history both as a colony and as a state.

The archives also feature an exhibit gallery with changing displays of art from its collections, and a permanent exhibit of posters from World War I.

== See also ==
- Louisiana Digital Media Archive
