= Bonnie Schneider =

American TV meteorologist

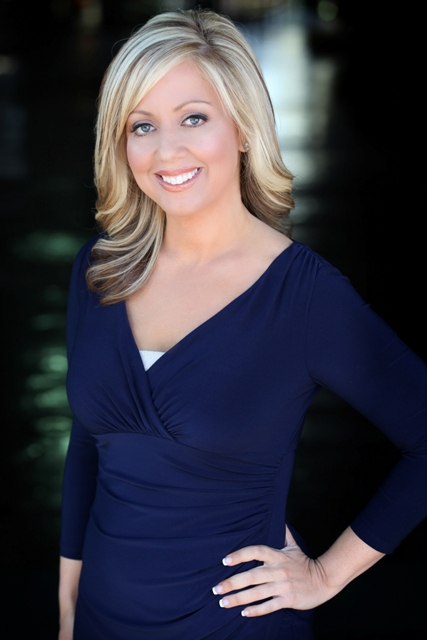
Extreme Weather, Bonnie Schneider - Meteorologist/Author

Bonnie Schneider is a national television meteorologist and the author of Extreme Weather, published by Palgrave Macmillan. She appears on The Weather Channel. She previously worked for Headline News, and Bloomberg Television.

A native of Jericho, New York, Schneider earned a bachelor's degree in journalism from Boston University. She pursued her meteorological studies at the State University of New York at Stony Brook and Hunter College in Manhattan. She started her career as a weekend meteorologist at KPLC-TV in Lake Charles, Louisiana.

Bonnie covered Hurricane Sandy for Bloomberg Television from their world headquarters in New York City While reporting on Hurricane Sandy for Bloomberg, Schneider was asked to participate on a panel for a live chat for Huffington Post Live and provide her analysis on the storm in an interview with Former Arkansas Governor Mike Huckabee on his nationally syndicated radio show on Cumulus Media Networks.

Schneider is the co-executive producer and Extreme Weather expert for a television special airing on the DIY Network, called Last House Standing. The show, which was shot on location in California, Alabama and Florida, provides home-owners tips on how to storm-proof against earthquakes, tornadoes and hurricanes.

Schneider's debut on CNN was on June 11, 2005, which was just in time to cover the 2005 Atlantic hurricane season, which included in-studio analysis of Hurricane Katrina. In 2008, she contributed to CNN International's coverage of Cyclone Nargis and the 2008 earthquake in China. During HLN's coverage of Hurricane Irene in August 2011.

Bonnie contributed news reports for Atlanta's NBC affiliate, WXIA throughout the 2012 Summer Olympics and the 2014 Winter Olympics.

Prior to CNN, Bloomberg TV, and WXIA, Schneider had been the weekend meteorologist and special assignment reporter for "The Ten O'Clock News" on WLVI-TV in Boston. While in Boston, she also provided entertainment and lifestyle reporting as a special assignment reporter three days a week. Prior to WLVI, she was the weekend meteorologist at WFOR-TV in Miami. She has held several meteorology and reporting positions, including News 12 Long Island, a 24-hour cable news television network, and WXII-TV, the NBC affiliate in Winston-Salem, North Carolina. She also worked for the CBS network in New York City as a frequent fill-in meteorologist on The Saturday Early Show.

Schneider was awarded the American Meteorological Society's seal of approval for broadcast meteorologists who achieve the highest standard of excellence in both technical weather knowledge and communication skills. She has also had the opportunity to interview a number of famous celebrities. While in New York at News 12, she earned the Associated Press Award for "Best Interview" for her half-hour special, "A Conversation with Billy Joel." She said she suffered from nerves just prior to the interview, but her uneasiness subsided after the legendary singer flashed her a smile and admitted that he watched her station's newscasts frequently and always kept an eye out for her "marine forecasts."

Bonnie was inducted into the Jericho High School Hall of Fame on April 16, 2015.
