= KSWL-LD =

Television station in Lake Charles, Louisiana

- Lake Charles, Louisiana; United States
- Channels: Digital: 34 (UHF); Virtual: 17
- Branding: CBS Lake Charles

Programming
- Affiliations: 17.1: CBS; for others, see § Subchannels

Ownership
- Owner: SagamoreHill Broadcasting; (SagamoreHill Lake Charles, LLC)
- Sister stations: KWWE-LD

History
- First air date: February 15, 2017
- Former call signs: K17KH-D (2011–2017)
- Former channel numbers: Digital: 17 (UHF, 2017–2019)
- Call sign meaning: Southwest Louisiana

Technical information
- Licensing authority: FCC
- Facility ID: 185296
- Class: LD
- ERP: 15 kW
- HAAT: 163.5 m (536 ft)
- Transmitter coordinates: 30°13′16.4″N 93°18′40.9″W

Links
- Public license information: LMS
- Website: www.cbslakecharles.tv

KSWL-LD (channel 17) is a low-power television station in Lake Charles, Louisiana, United States, affiliated with CBS. It is owned by SagamoreHill Broadcasting alongside MeTV/MyNetworkTV/Telemundo affiliate KWWE-LD (channel 19). The two stations share studios on West Prien Lake Road in Lake Charles; KSWL-LD's transmitter is located at the KTSR tower in Westlake.

== History ==
In 2011, the FCC awarded a construction permit for the station, with the call sign of K17KH-D. The current KSWL-LD calls were adopted on February 10, 2017. Five days later, the station went on the air as the Lake Charles area's CBS affiliate, owned by Lake Charles Television, LLC, a unit of Waypoint Media.

KSWL-LD is the area's first CBS affiliate since the shutdown of its original CBS affiliate, KTAG-TV (UHF channel 25), in August 1961. Between that time, KLFY-TV in Lafayette served as the default CBS affiliate via cable for Southwestern Louisiana, while Beaumont affiliate KFDM was carried by a few cable providers in some areas of the market. Between KSWL-LD's sign-on as part of CBS, sister station KWWE-LD's sign on as a MyNetworkTV affiliate, and Fox affiliate KVHP launching ABC programming on its DT2 subchannel, the year 2017 marks the first time that the Lake Charles area has received over-the-air service from every major television network, having previously relied on cable television to supply network affiliates from Lafayette and Beaumont for CBS, ABC, MyNetworkTV, and until 2009, The CW.

On December 31, 2019, SagamoreHill Broadcasting acquired the station from Waypoint Media.

== News operation ==
The station is unusual among CBS affiliates in that it carries no local news. However, it airs local weather inserts during CBS Mornings as well as a five-minute weathercast at the conclusion of CBS' prime time programming. KSWL also produces and airs two sports programs focused on Southwest Louisiana-area sports: Sound Off, which is a call-in show about secondary and postsecondary sports, and Poke Nation, covering sports at McNeese State University.

== Subchannels ==
The station's signal is multiplexed:

Subchannels of KSWL-LD
Subchannel	Res.	Short name	Programming
17.1	1080i	KSWLCBS	CBS
17.2	480i	CourtTV	Court TV
17.3	480i	LaffTV	Laff
17.4	480i	QVC	QVC
17.5	480i	Mystery	Ion Mystery
