= Louisiana Farm Bureau Federation =

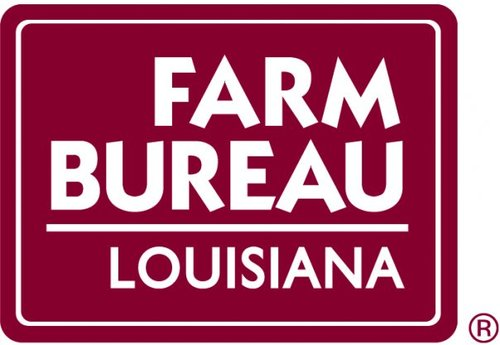

The Louisiana Farm Bureau Federation (LFB) is a state chapter of the United States's largest general farm organization representing farmers, ranchers, and rural residents. The organization provides assistance toward the development and prosperity of Louisiana agriculture. It is a private, non-profit, non-governmental agency established in 1922 to bring a voice to Louisiana farmers and their families. It is based in Baton Rouge, Louisiana.

== Organizational overview ==
The Louisiana Farm Bureau Federation is part of the American Farm Bureau Federation, established in 1919, and is the nation's largest general farm and ranch organization. State Senator Norris C. Williamson of East Carroll Parish, was among the founders of the Louisiana branch of the federation and served on the first board of directors.

In 2016, the Louisiana Farm Bureau had a membership of over 142,000 including farmers, ranchers, rural residents, landowners, agricultural lenders and other stakeholders in Louisiana agriculture.

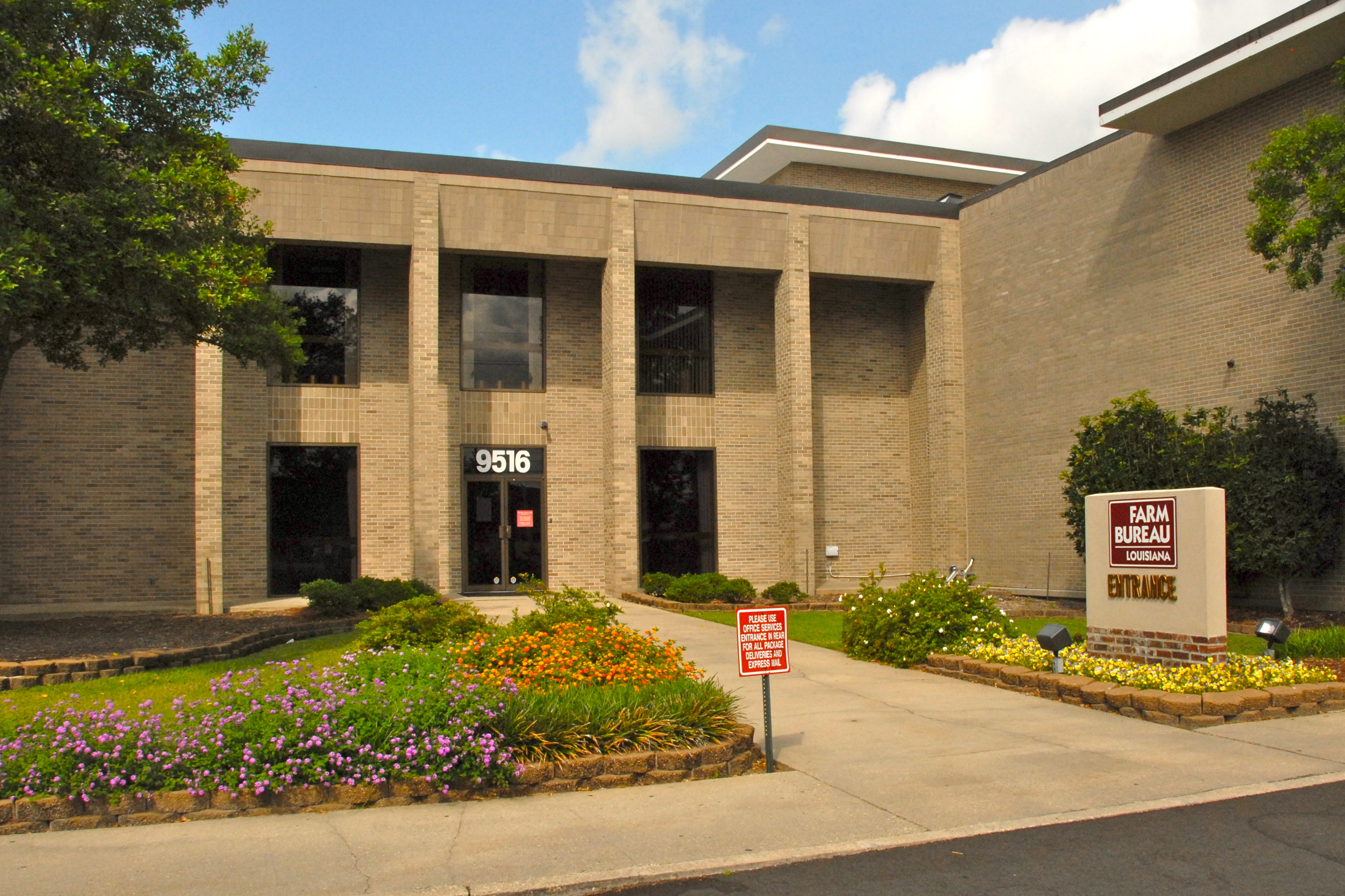
Federation office

The Louisiana Farm Bureau Federation is made up of volunteer leaders at the local, parish and statewide level. Each parish has a parish Farm Bureau, with its own president and board of directors. These local leaders are farmers who usually grow crops specific to their area and thereby are better in touch with the needs of their local parish membership.

Ronald R. Anderson is currently the president of the Louisiana Farm Bureau Federation. He was first elected in 1989 and succeeded long-time president and St. James sugar grower James Graugnard. Anderson, who also sits on the American Farm Bureau Board of Directors, is a cattle producer from Ethel, La. He has served in various leadership positions in organizations across Louisiana, including membership on the LSU Board of Supervisors. In 2000 he was inducted into the LSU Alumni Hall of Distinction for his service to LSU and Louisiana agriculture.

Anderson is one of a five-member executive committee, made up of the president, first, second and third vice presidents and a secretary-treasurer. Eleven other members representing geographical districts along with the chairs of the Women's Leadership Committee and the Young Farmers & Ranchers Committee form the Farm Bureau Board of Directors. All members of the board and executive committee are elected by voting delegates sent to the annual Farm Bureau convention each summer to vote on policy recommendations from the local parish Farm Bureaus.

In March 2017, Anderson was among some seventy farmers from the federation who met in Washington, D.C., with U.S. Representative Ralph Abraham of Louisiana's 5th congressional district to lobby for agricultural interests. Abraham responded favorably to the farmers: "Food security is national security. Agriculture is at the forefront of the fight because any interruption in the food supply or a compromise in its safety goes right to the heart of the nation." Marty Wooldridge, a cattleman from Caddo Parish, said that Abraham's slogan "Food security is national security" should be incorporated into the slogan of the Farm Bureau.

== Programs ==
=== Television programming ===
This Week in Louisiana Agriculture, or TWILA, is an agricultural television series produced by the Louisiana Farm Bureau Federation. The 30-minute weekly program was created in 1981 by Regnal Wallace, the public relations director at the time. The series airs across Louisiana and nationwide on the RFD-TV network. TWILA's team of reporters and producers tell the story of Louisiana agriculture from the perspective of both farmers and consumers. The program is one of the longest running, independently produced television series in the state.

This Week in Louisiana Agriculture draws some 500,000 viewers across Louisiana and the nation.

=== Community outreach ===
The Women's Leadership Committee works year-round to educate consumers on the importance of agriculture while engaging in statewide commodity promotion. Each year the committee leads special projects such as National Food Checkout Week, Hunger Awareness Month, Farm-City Celebrations and other commodity promotional events. Parish committees also work at the local level to bring nutritional awareness to consumers.

=== Youth programs ===
The Louisiana Farm Bureau Young Farmers & Ranchers program promotes and strengthens Louisiana agriculture by offering opportunities for training and leadership experience to younger producers. The program focuses on personal growth and leadership development in the areas of public speaking, media training, issue advocacy, business development, networking, service leadership and telling the story of agriculture.\

Louisiana Farm Bureau also has a large role in the aid in many student-related youth programs around agriculture, including LSU AgCenter's Louisiana 4-H program as well as the Louisiana FFA Organization.

=== Educational programs ===
Agriculture in the Classroom (AITC) is a distinctly focused, uniquely structured organization dedicated to engaging and enlightening students and teachers across Louisiana about the importance of agriculture to consumers at large and in their own lives.

The mission of the Louisiana's AITC program is to increase understanding of agriculture and instill an appreciation for our renewable food, fiber and fuel systems through education.
