= Daily World (Opelousas) =

Daily newspaper published in Opelousas, Louisiana

- Type: Daily newspaper
- Owner: USA Today Co.
- Founder(s): John R. Thistlethwaite and Ducote Andrepont
- Founded: 1939
- Headquarters: Opelousas, Louisiana
- Country: United States
- Website: dailyworld.com

The Daily World is a USA Today Co.-owned daily newspaper in Opelousas, Louisiana, United States.

== History ==
The Opelousas Daily World was founded by John R. Thistlethwaite and Ducote Andrepont. The newspaper was the first offset-printed daily newspaper in the world, and remained the sole offset-printed daily newspaper for nine years. Its first edition was published on December 24, 1939. Thistlethwaite later acquired Mr. Andrepont's interest in the operation.

Rigby Owen was the managing editor during World War II while John Thistlethwaite was a Marine aviator flying the F4U Corsair, night fighter squadron, in the South Pacific. Thistlethwaite took over editor and publisher duties on his return from the war.

The Daily World was sold to Worrel Newspapers Inc. in 1972. The New York Times Company acquired 8 daily papers, including the Daily World, from Worrell in 1982, as part of the New York Times Regional Newspaper Group. Gannett acquired the Daily World from the Times Company in 2000.
