= This Week in Louisiana Agriculture =

This Week in Louisiana Agriculture, or TWILA, is an agricultural television series produced by the Louisiana Farm Bureau Federation based in Baton Rouge, Louisiana. The 30-minute weekly program airs across Louisiana and nationwide on both the RFD-TV network and SiriusXM satellite radio. TWILA's team of reporters and producers tell the story of Louisiana agriculture from the perspective of both farmers and consumers.

The series, which began on September 24, 1981, was created and produced by Regnal Wallace, then director of public relations for the Farm Bureau. Michael "Mike" Danna (1960-2015) broadcast the program after Wallace retired. The two died a year apart, Danna in 2015 and Wallace in 2016. Today the show is produced by Josh Meeks and co-hosted by Avery Davidson and Kristen Oaks-White.
