= KADN-TV =

Television station in Lafayette, Louisiana

- Lafayette, Louisiana; United States
- Channels: Digital: 16 (UHF); Virtual: 15
- Branding: Fox 15; Acadiana News First (newscasts)

Programming
- Affiliations: 15.1: Fox; 15.2: NBC; 15.3: Independent with MyNetworkTV; for others, see § Subchannels

Ownership
- Owner: Gray Media; (Gray Television Licensee, LLC)
- Sister stations: KATC; KLAF-LD; KNGC-LD

History
- First air date: March 1, 1980
- Former call signs: KADN (1980−2009)
- Former channel numbers: Analog: 15 (UHF, 1980–2009)
- Former affiliations: Independent (1980–1986); CBS (secondary, 1980–2005)
- Call sign meaning: "Acadian"

Technical information
- Licensing authority: FCC
- Facility ID: 33261
- ERP: 800 kW
- HAAT: 359 m (1,178 ft)
- Transmitter coordinates: 30°21′43.5″N 92°12′52.5″W

Links
- Public license information: Public file; LMS
- Website: www.acadiananewsfirst.com

KADN-TV (channel 15) is a television station in Lafayette, Louisiana, United States, affiliated with Fox and MyNetworkTV. It is owned by Gray Media alongside ABC affiliate KATC (channel 3) and NBC affiliate KLAF-LD (channel 14). KADN-TV and KLAF-LD share studios on Eraste Landry Road in Lafayette; KADN-TV's transmitter is located south of Church Point, in rural Acadia Parish.

== History ==
=== Prior use of channel 15 in Lafayette ===
Channel 15 in Lafayette was originally home to KLNI-TV (licensed to Lafayette and New Iberia), which operated as an NBC affiliate beginning on September 16, 1968. It was owned by Southwestern Louisiana Communications, Inc., and it was the first TV station built in southwestern Louisiana to broadcast in full color. Like other NBC affiliates in the region, it temporarily brought PBS programming, specifically Sesame Street, to the Acadiana area from 1970 until 1972. However, Lafayette was just barely large enough at the time to support three full network affiliates. KLNI-TV, a UHF station, found it difficult to compete against longer-established KATC-TV (channel 3) and KLFY-TV (channel 10). It did not help matters that WBRZ-TV in Baton Rouge and KPLC-TV in Lake Charles both provided strong grade B coverage to most of the market after relocating their transmission towers and increasing their respective heights. After suffering financial difficulties for most of its existence, KLNI discontinued operations on February 21, 1975. This left WBRZ (and later WRBT) and KPLC as the region's de facto NBC affiliates; the latter was carried by most cable providers in south-central Louisiana. The allocation for channel 15 in Lafayette as a commercial TV station remained after the demise of KLNI-TV, but the frequency stayed dark for the next five years.

=== Early years ===
KADN-TV, the current incarnation of channel 15, began broadcasting on March 1, 1980, as an independent station, offering mainly movies, old sitcoms, children's programming, and local sports. It was owned by Charles Chatelain and his company, Delta Media Corporation. The station used the on-air slogan "Acadiana's Alternative", and also called itself "The Movie Station".

Unusually for an independent station in what, then as now, was a fairly small market, KADN was innovative in creating its own original programming. It gained particular notice for its music programming. Shows such as The Larry Brasso Show (country music), Cypress with Warren Storm (swamp pop) and the long-running Laissez les Bon Temps Rouler (Cajun French music) were Saturday mainstays during the station's early years. The latter program also aired in reruns aired weekday mornings under the title Bon Temps Rouler Encore. A music video hour aired daily called Acadiana Music Box around the same time MTV was catching on.

Also in the early years, KADN had its own news department, first with five-minute newsbreaks and then its own 5 p.m. daily newscast called Acadiana in Review. After just a couple of years, station management realized that it was not financially feasible to compete with KLFY and KATC in news, so the news department was eliminated.

Shortly after KADN signed on the air, KLFY preempted an episode of the popular prime time drama series Dallas to run a Billy Graham televangelism special. Chatelain persuaded CBS to let KADN clear the episode. At that time, an arrangement was made for channel 15 to officially become a CBS secondary affiliate, picking up a microwave relay of WAFB in Baton Rouge for network programming. KADN then began airing any CBS programming that KLFY preempted for one reason or another, especially the morning daytime offerings from 9 to 10 a.m. (KADN would air those shows in the afternoon.) The arrangement lasted until 2005, with preempted CBS programming running in the later years on sister station KLAF-LP.

KADN-TV is a charter affiliate of Fox, having joined the network upon its debut in October 1986.

From the late 1980s to 1997, KADN operated a low-powered semi-satellite in Alexandria, K47DW, to bring Fox programming to central Louisiana. It aired separate commercials for the Alexandria market, identifying as "Fox 47". In 1991, when Delta Media bought WNTZ in Natchez, the Fox affiliation moved to channel 48. The channel 47 translator then simulcast WNTZ to serve portions of Alexandria where channel 48's signal was weak.

=== ComCorp operating agreement ===
In 1997, Communications Corporation of America (ComCorp) began operating KADN in 1997 through a leased marketing agreement with original owner Charles Chatelain until purchasing the station outright in late 2004. After being located on cable channel 8 since sign-on, KADN moved to channel 6 on August 15, 2006, as part of a lineup restructuring of the Cox Communications Greater Lafayette system.

In June 2006, owner ComCorp filed for Chapter 11 bankruptcy protection. ComCorp said in a press release viewers and staff would see no changes at the station. ComCorp emerged from bankruptcy in October 2007.

The programming of sister station KLAF-LP was added to KADN-DT's signal on channel 15.2 in August 2007. This began a period of transition in which all four translators that made up KLAF were shut off.

In early 2008, KADN became the first station in the Lafayette market to air high-definition programming outside of network-provided offerings with syndicated reruns of Two and a Half Men airing in 720p HD. Further, on February 29, 2008, KADN began airing promotional materials throughout the day in 720p HD and identifying on the HD signal as "Fox 15 HD".

KADN-TV shut down its analog signal, over UHF channel 15, on June 12, 2009, the official date on which full-power television stations in the United States transitioned from analog to digital broadcasts under federal mandate. The station's digital signal remained on its pre-transition UHF channel 16, using virtual channel 15.

=== Three sales in six years ===
On April 24, 2013, ComCorp announced the sale of its entire group (including flagship KADN and sister station KLAF-LD) to Nexstar Broadcasting Group. The sale was completed on January 1, 2015.

On May 7, 2015, Nexstar Broadcasting announced that KLAF-LD, which was simulcast on KADN-TV 15.2, would be the new NBC affiliate for the Lafayette market effective July 1, 2015. They also announced that on that same date, KADN-TV would launch a third subchannel and move KLAF-LD's former MyNetworkTV affiliation there.

On January 27, 2016, Nexstar announced it would acquire Media General for $4.6 billion. Since Media General already owned CBS affiliate KLFY-TV, the company was required to sell either KLFY or KADN to another company. On May 27, 2016, Nexstar announced that it would keep KLFY-TV and sell KADN-TV and KLAF-LD to Bayou City Broadcasting for $40 million. The sale was finalized January 17, 2017.

On May 6, 2019, it was announced that Entertainment Studios through its Allen Media Broadcasting division would purchase the Bayou City stations (including KADN-TV) for $165 million. The sale was completed on July 31, 2019.

On January 11, 2024, KADN-TV reached an agreement with New Orleans Pelicans over-the-air rightsholder Gray Television to air 10 games on the station during the 2023–24 NBA season.

On September 17, 2024, Gray and the Pelicans announced a broader deal to form the Gulf Coast Sports & Entertainment Network, which would broadcast nearly all 2024–25 Pelicans games on Gray's stations in the Gulf South, as well as KADN-TV.

On June 1, 2025, amid financial woes and rising debt, Allen Media Group announced that it would explore "strategic options" for the company, such as a sale of its television stations (including KADN and KLAF-LD). On August 8, 2025, it was announced that AMG would sell 13 of its stations, including KADN and KLAF-LD, to Gray Media for $171 million. This acquisition, along with that of KATC from E. W. Scripps Company, would bring the ABC, NBC, and Fox affiliations in the region under common ownership. The FCC approved the multi-market Gray–Scripps exchange on April 28, 2026; the KADN/KLAF purchase was completed on May 1.

== Newscasts ==
Fox News Louisiana

On March 26, 2007, KADN began running on-air promos teasing a 9 p.m. newscast with the tagline "At 9 it's news, by 10 it's history."

Fox News Louisiana was produced by Baton Rouge Fox affiliate WGMB. Originally, the first 20 minutes of the program were taped earlier and geared specifically towards the Acadiana audience, with stories by Lafayette-based reporters, plus a local forecast. KADN then joined WGMB's live broadcast for the final two segments, which included generic national and world news, plus a statewide sportscast. In 2008, the newscast was retitled Fox News Lafayette, although the former branding (Fox News Louisiana) was not removed from the set.

On August 20, 2007, KADN debuted Fox News Louisiana AM, a 7 to 9 a.m. newscast. Like the evening news, certain segments were taped and included stories by the Lafayette-based reporting staff, while other segments were aired live. In December 2008, Fox News Louisiana AM was canceled.

In April 2009, KADN canceled its 30-minute evening newscast and let go of its local news staff. KADN then aired Fox News Now at 9 p.m., a five-minute newscast featuring local headlines and a weather forecast. This was expanded to a full half-hour and renamed Fox15 News Lafayette when KADN's DT2 signal, simulcasting KLAF-LD, launched its news department on April 1, 2016. Until that time, KLAF-LD simulcast newscasts from Baton Rouge-based NBC affiliate WVLA-TV, which Nexstar operates under a shared services agreement (SSA) with White Knight Broadcasting.

News 15

On April 3, 2017, KADN/KLAF unveiled a refurbished news set, adopted the current News 15 branding, and dropped the "Acadiana's KLAF" branding for KLAF and KADN 15.2. KADN 15.1 aired newscasts from 5 to 9 a.m. daily (except on weekends) and 9 p.m. nightly seven days a week. NBC 15.2 aired newscasts at noon, 5, 6, and 10 p.m. on weekdays, and 10 p.m. only on weekends. KADN 15.2 continued to be a simulcast of KLAF 14.1.

On January 17, 2025, Allen Media Group announced plans to cut local meteorologist/weather forecaster positions from its stations, including KADN/KLAF, and replacing them with a "weather hub" produced by The Weather Channel, which AMG also owns. The decision was reversed within a week by management in response to "viewer and advertiser reaction".

In September 2026, Gray announced the merger of KADN/KLAF's news department with KATC under the Acadiana News First branding.

== Subchannels ==
The station's signal is multiplexed:

Subchannels of KADN-TV
Subchannel	Res.	Short name	Programming
15.1	720p	KADN HD	Fox
15.2	1080i	KLAF HD	NBC (KLAF-LD)
15.3	480i	MyTV	Independent with MyNetworkTV
15.4	480i	DABL	Dabl
15.5	480i	MeTVToo	MeTV Toons

Simulcast of subchannels of another station
