= KLAF-LD =

Television station in Lafayette, Louisiana

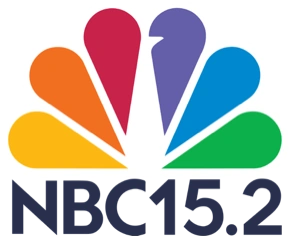
- Lafayette, Louisiana; United States
- Channels: Digital: 14 (UHF); Virtual: 14
- Branding: NBC 15.2, Acadiana News First (newscasts)

Programming
- Affiliations: 14.1: NBC

Ownership
- Owner: Gray Media; (Gray Television Licensee, LLC)
- Sister stations: KATC; KADN-TV; KNGC-LD

History
- Founded: January 11, 1993
- First air date: November 29, 1995
- Former call signs: K46DG (1993–1999); K58GA (1999–2007); KOPP-LP (2007); KLAF-LP (2007–2012)
- Former channel numbers: Analog: 62 (UHF, 1991−2007); Digital: 46 (UHF, 2007–2020)
- Former affiliations: Channel America (1991–1995); UPN (1995–2006); The WB (secondary, 1995–1999); CBS (per program, 2000–2005); MyNetworkTV (2006–2015)
- Call sign meaning: "Lafayette"

Technical information
- Licensing authority: FCC
- Facility ID: 16535
- ERP: 2.65 kW
- HAAT: 147 m (482 ft)
- Transmitter coordinates: 30°12′17.9″N 92°4′43.2″W
- Translator(s): KADN-TV 15.2 Lafayette

Links
- Public license information: LMS
- Website: www.acadiananewsfirst.com

KLAF-LD (channel 14) is a low-power television station in Lafayette, Louisiana, United States, affiliated with NBC. It is owned by Gray Media alongside ABC affiliate KATC (channel 3) and Fox affiliate KADN-TV (channel 15). KLAF-LD and KADN-TV share studios on Eraste Landry Road in Lafayette; KLAF-LD's transmitter is located near Scott, Louisiana.

Even though KLAF-LD airs a digital signal of its own, it only covers the immediate Lafayette area. Therefore, in order to expand its broadcasting radius, KLAF-LD is simulcast in high definition on KADN-TV's second digital subchannel (hence the NBC 15.2 branding) from a transmitter south of Church Point.

== History ==
KLAF's origins begin on October 17, 1991, when Delta Media–then the owner of KADN-TV–signed on low-power television station K62DW in Lafayette as "K62TV". In its beginnings, K62TV broadcast mostly Channel America programming mixed in with some repurposed local shows from KADN—such as Laissez les Bon Temps Rouler and In Brief—along with local USL sports and Houston Astros baseball games. K62DW was renamed to Variety TV in late 1993 and VTV shortly thereafter.

When UPN launched in January 1995, K62DW became a charter affiliate as "UPN Lafayette" and dropped Channel America programming. At the same time, Delta Media signed on translators in New Iberia (K55HA) and Church Point (K69HD) and K62DW picked up the callsign KLAF-LP. Shortly after, the KLAF-LP transmitter moved to Opelousas and K46DG signed on in Lafayette. KLAF added a secondary WB affiliation in August 1995 but lost it in 1999 when KLWB launched as a cable-only WB affiliate as part of The WB 100+. KLAF went through branding changes in 1997, when "UPN Lafayette" was dropped in favor of "KLAF", then in 2004, under pressure from the network to standardize all affiliates' branding, KLAF became "UPN 17", reflecting its channel position on the local cable system. From 2000 to 2005, KLAF also served as a secondary CBS affiliate, clearing programs that the area's main affiliate, KLFY-TV (channel 10) did not.

UPN and the WB announced in early 2006 that network operations would shutter that September. Shortly after the announcement, Fox Entertainment Group created the MyNetworkTV syndication service, and on March 15, it was announced that KLAF would become Lafayette's MyNetworkTV affiliate at the network's launch in September. During a transitional period that ran from August 15 to September 4, the on-air branding reverted to "KLAF", with no network or channel number designation. On September 5, KLAF became a full-fledged MyNetworkTV affiliate as "MyKLAF TV".

In June 2006, then-owner Communications Corporation of America (ComCorp) filed for Chapter 11 bankruptcy protection. ComCorp said in a press release viewers and staff would see no changes at the station. ComCorp emerged from bankruptcy in October 2007.

On July 5, 2012, the station changed its call sign to KLAF-LD upon conversion to digital transmission.

On April 24, 2013, ComCorp announced the sale of its entire group (including flagship KADN and KLAF) to Nexstar Broadcasting Group. The sale was completed on January 1, 2015.

On July 1, 2015, KLAF-LD changed affiliations to NBC, the network's first affiliate in Lafayette since the 1975 shutdown of KLNI-TV (channel 15, now occupied by KADN-TV) four decades earlier; in the interim, area cable systems imported KPLC from Lake Charles (Lafayette's default NBC station at the time), KALB-TV from Alexandria, and/or sister station WVLA-TV from Baton Rouge for NBC programming. MyNetworkTV programming moved to the 15.3 subchannel on KADN-TV.

On January 27, 2016, Nexstar announced it would acquire Media General for $4.6 billion. Since Media General owned CBS affiliate KLFY-TV, the company was required to sell either KLFY or sister station KADN to another company. On May 27, 2016, Nexstar announced that it would keep KLFY-TV and sell KLAF-LD, along with KADN-TV, to Bayou City Broadcasting for $40 million. The sale was finalized January 17, 2017.

On May 6, 2019, it was announced that Entertainment Studios, headed by entertainment entrepreneur Byron Allen, would purchase the Bayou City stations (including KLAF-LD) for $165 million. The sale was completed on July 3, 2019. In 2020, KLAF relocated its digital channel from 46 to 14; at the same time, its virtual channel also moved to 14.

On June 1, 2025, amid financial woes and rising debt, Allen Media Group announced that it would explore "strategic options" for the company, such as a sale of its television stations (including KLAF-LD and KADN). On August 8, 2025, it was announced that AMG would sell 12 of its stations, including KLAF-LD and KADN, to Gray Media for $171 million. This acquisition, along with that of KATC from E. W. Scripps Company, would bring the ABC, NBC, and Fox affiliations in the region under common ownership. The FCC approved the multi-market Gray–Scripps exchange on April 28, 2026; the KADN/KLAF purchase was completed on May 1.

== Newscasts ==
Concurrent with KLAF-LD's move to NBC, the station began simulcasting newscasts from virtual sister station WVLA-TV (the station that KLAF replaced on channels 3 and 1003 on Cox Communications' Lafayette system) on July 1, 2015.

On March 31, 2016, Nexstar announced that KLAF (alongside sister station KADN) would launch its own news department on April 1 at 5 p.m. The formation of the news department resulted in the hiring of 24 news and production employees.

On April 3, 2017, KADN/KLAF unveiled a refurbished news set, adopted the current News 15 branding, and dropped the "Acadiana's KLAF" branding for KLAF and KADN 15.2. KADN 15.1 airs newscasts from 5 to 9 a.m. daily (except on weekends) and 9 p.m. nightly seven days a week. NBC 15.2 airs newscasts at 5–7 a.m., noon, 5, 6, and 10 p.m. on weekdays, and 10 p.m. only on weekends. KADN 15.2 continues to be a simulcast of KLAF 14.1.

On January 17, 2025, Allen Media Group announced plans to cut local meteorologist/weather forecaster positions from its stations, including KADN/KLAF, and replacing them with a "weather hub" produced by The Weather Channel, which AMG also owns. The decision was reversed within a week by management in response to "viewer and advertiser reaction".

In September 2026, following the acquisition of KATC, KADN, and KLAF by Gray, the company announced that it would merge the stations' news departments under the joint branding Acadiana News First.

== Technical information ==
=== Subchannel ===
Subchannel of KLAF-LD
| Subchannel | Res. | Short name | Programming |
|---|---|---|---|
| 14.1 | 1080i | KLAF-LD | NBC |

=== Former translators ===
KLAF previously broadcast its analog signal on UHF channel 62, but because of its low power output and distance from the city of Lafayette, it was relayed across a small network of three translator stations:

- K58GA (channel 46) in Lafayette
- K55HA (channel 55) in New Iberia
- K69HD (channel 69) in Church Point

In August 2007, KLAF began to make the transition to a single, full-market station as programming was added to KADN-TV on channel 15.2. One by one, the translators were taken off the air, beginning with K69HD (Church Point) on October 25 until only K58GA (Lafayette) remained. On November 9, 2007, K58GA became KOPP-LP, in preparation to move KLAF-LP's calls there.
