= KATC (TV) =

Television station in Lafayette, Louisiana

- Lafayette, Louisiana; United States
- Channels: Digital: 28 (UHF); Virtual: 3
- Branding: ABC 3; Acadiana News First (newscasts)

Programming
- Affiliations: 3.1: ABC; for others, see § Subchannels

Ownership
- Owner: Gray Media; (Gray Television Licensee, LLC)
- Sister stations: KADN-TV; KLAF-LD; KNGC-LD

History
- First air date: September 19, 1962
- Former channel numbers: Analog: 3 (VHF, 1962–2009)
- Call sign meaning: Acadian Television Corporation, founding owner

Technical information
- Licensing authority: FCC
- Facility ID: 33471
- ERP: 1,000 kW
- HAAT: 537 m (1,762 ft)
- Transmitter coordinates: 30°19′25.7″N 92°17′24.5″W

Links
- Public license information: Public file; LMS
- Website: www.acadiananewsfirst.com

KATC (channel 3) is a television station in Lafayette, Louisiana, United States, affiliated with ABC. It is owned by Gray Media alongside Fox affiliate KADN-TV (channel 15) and NBC affiliate KLAF-LD (channel 14). KATC's studios are located on Eraste Landry Road in Lafayette, and its transmitter is located near Branch, Louisiana.

KATC began broadcasting on September 19, 1962, and has been an ABC affiliate since its inception. It was Lafayette's second TV station after KLFY-TV (channel 10) and for decades was a distant second-place outlet in local news under several owners, including Loyola University. A typo in a letter to the station's founding owner and namesake, Acadian Television Corporation, is claimed to have resulted in the coining of the term Acadiana for southern Louisiana. The station airs local newscasts covering the region.

== History ==
In 1957, the Federal Communications Commission (FCC) authorized the insertion of channel 3 at either Lafayette or Lake Charles as one of three new television channels assigned to the state. With the channel approved, applicants filed seeking authority to build a station to use it. The Acadian Television Corporation was formed on April 8, 1957, and had two primary stockholders: Paul Kurzweg Jr. a Lafayette doctor, and Edward E. Wilson, son of U.S. defense secretary Charles Erwin Wilson. Evangeline Broadcasting Company, owner of Lafayette radio station KVOL, applied in June. Also seeking the channel were Lake Charles TV station KTAG-TV, seeking approval to move to channel 3 from UHF channel 25, and two consulting engineers from Los Angeles, whose bid was dismissed twice on technical grounds. Additionally, Lafayette's existing television station, KLFY-TV (channel 10), was in the contest until February 1960 because it wanted to change transmitter sites and therefore cause possible interference to the proposed channel 3.

On June 7, 1961, FCC hearing examiner Millard French handed down an initial decision favoring Acadian Television Corporation for channel 3. KTAG-TV's proposal was rejected because of concerns over signal strength in Lake Charles. French turned down Evangeline in most comparative criteria, most notably diversity of business interests and diversification of media ownership. The decision to award the channel to Acadian prompted KTAG-TV to leave the air two months later. With final technical approval granted in January 1962, Acadian began construction and obtained primary affiliation with ABC. KATC began broadcasting on September 19, 1962. Kurzweg died in 1964, and his widow Frances became company president the following year.

KATC claims to have coined the term "Acadiana" for its coverage area. In 1963, a New York typist sent a letter to Acadian Television and inadvertently addressed it as "Acadiana Television". Bob Hamm and Bill Patton claimed to have adopted the term, which then stuck and displaced Evangeline as the primary regional identifier.

In 1981, Acadian Television Corporation sold KATC to Loyola University, owners of WWL radio and WWL-TV in New Orleans. The $20 million purchase was handled through Abellor Corporation, a Loyola subsidiary. Five years later, in spite of KATC being what president James C. Carter called a "marvelous investment", Loyola's trustees elected to focus on their New Orleans properties and put the Lafayette station on the market. Adams Communications was selected as the buyer for $31 million, but the offer fell through, and ML Media Partners acquired KATC for $28 million. ML was one of several ventures involving former ABC executives Elton Rule and I. Martin Pompadur, in this case with New York investment firm Merrill Lynch.

ML Media Partners put KATC up for sale in January 1995 as the company sought to divest itself of nearly all its television station properties. Cordillera Communications, a subsidiary of the Evening Post Publishing Company, acquired the station from ML, citing its then-recent improvements in local news ratings.

In 2007, KATC built its high-power digital transmission facility; previously, it had broadcast a low-power signal serving the immediate Lafayette area. KATC opted not to use its existing tower located near Kaplan, Louisiana, because of its proximity to the Gulf Coast, hurricane risk, and higher insurance premiums south of Interstate 10. Instead, the station constructed a new, 1,800-foot (550 m) mast capable of providing high-power service to the Lafayette and Lake Charles area. At the time, KATC was the closest ABC affiliate to Lake Charles; in 2017, a subchannel of KVHP became that market's ABC affiliate. The original tower remained standing and in use by KAJN-FM and Louisiana Public Broadcasting until 2018, when an airplane crashed into it, killing the pilot. A subchannel of KATC served as Lafayette's affiliate of The CW beginning in June 2010.

Cordillera announced on October 29, 2018, that it would sell most of its stations, including KATC, to the E. W. Scripps Company. The sale was completed on May 1, 2019. The CW—by this time majority-owned by Nexstar Media Group, owner of KLFY-TV—dropped its remaining affiliations with Scripps in 2024, and the network moved to a subchannel of KLFY.

On July 7, 2025, it was announced that, as part of an exchange of several stations between Scripps and Gray Media, KATC would be traded to Gray, giving that company a presence in every media market in Louisiana. The following month, Gray announced its intent to purchase KADN-TV and KLAF-LD from Allen Media Group, which would bring the ABC, NBC, and Fox affiliations in the region under common ownership. The FCC approved the multi-market Gray–Scripps exchange on April 28, 2026; the KADN/KLAF purchase was completed on May 1.

== News operation ==
Historically, KATC was a distant runner-up to KLFY in news ratings, with stronger performance in the immediate Lafayette metro area than in the full media market. In the 2000s, KATC recruited talent from KLFY's news staff, including anchors Hoyt Harris and Darla Montgomery and meteorologist Rob Perillo.

In 2023, Scripps implemented a new model of evening newscast production that utilized live and pre-recorded segments. After the announcement, main evening anchors Marcelle Fontenot and Jim Hummel departed at the same time after over 10 years together on KATC's evening news. Station management emphasized that the reformatting would free up resources for reporting and increased local content. Fontenot and Hummel then joined the staff of KADN-TV. As of June 2025, KATC produced 25 hours a week of local news programming.

In September 2026, Gray announced that it would merge KLAF and KADN's news department with KATC under the joint branding Acadiana News First; the changes were scheduled to take effect in October 2026.

=== Notable former on-air staff ===
- Bill Elder – reporter, –1966

== Technical information ==
=== Subchannels ===
KATC's transmitter is located in Branch, Louisiana. The station's signal is multiplexed:

Subchannels of KATC
Subchannel	Res.	Short name	Programming
3.1	720p	KATC-HD	ABC
3.2	720p	GCSEN	Gulf Coast SEN
3.3	480i	Grit	Grit (4:3)
3.4	480i	CourtTV	Court TV
3.5	480i	Bounce	Bounce TV
3.6	480i	QVC	QVC

=== Analog-to-digital conversion ===
KATC shut down its analog signal, over VHF channel 3, on June 12, 2009, as part of the federally mandated transition from analog to digital television. The station's digital signal remained on its pre-transition UHF channel 28, using virtual channel 3.
