= KVHP =

Television station in Lake Charles, Louisiana

- Lake Charles, Louisiana; United States
- Channels: Digital: 18 (UHF); Virtual: 29
- Branding: KVHP Fox 29; Fox 29 Now @ 9 (newscasts); SWLA ABC (29.2); Univision Lake Charles (29.4)

Programming
- Affiliations: 29.1: Fox; 29.2: ABC; 29.4: Univision; for others, see § Subchannels

Ownership
- Owner: Gray Media; (Gray Television Licensee, LLC)
- Sister stations: KPLC

History
- First air date: December 12, 1982
- Former channel numbers: Analog: 29 (UHF, 1982–2009); Digital: 30 (UHF, until 2018)
- Former affiliations: Independent (1982–1986); The CW (29.2, 2009–2017)
- Call sign meaning: Hugh Van Eaton, Herschell Hardesty, Harold Protter (original owners)

Technical information
- Licensing authority: FCC
- Facility ID: 35852
- ERP: 400 kW
- HAAT: 393 m (1,289 ft)
- Transmitter coordinates: 30°17′27″N 93°34′36″W

Links
- Public license information: Public file; LMS
- Website: watchfox29.revrocket.us

KVHP (channel 29) is a television station in Lake Charles, Louisiana, United States, affiliated with Fox, ABC and Univision. It is owned by Gray Media alongside dual NBC/CW+ affiliate KPLC (channel 7). The two stations share studios on Division Street in downtown Lake Charles; KVHP's transmitter is located in rural northwestern Calcasieu Parish five miles (8 km) northwest of Edgerly (halfway between Lake Charles and Beaumont, Texas, allowing the station's signal to reach both markets).

== History ==
The station first signed on the air on December 12, 1982, as an independent station with the slogan "Make a U-Turn to KVHP, Channel 29", airing a mixture of religious and family programming. It signed on by Dr. Hugh Van Eaton, a local Baptist minister, and he entered a partnership with Dr. J. W. DiGiglia and Herschell Hardesty and Harold E. Protter (also a co-owner of independent station WNOL in New Orleans) in 1984, under the name Lake Charles Electronic Media. In 1986, New Orleans televangelist Marvin Gorman purchased the station out of receivership, and he, in turn, sold the station to a group of five businessmen, Gary Hardesty (son of Herschell Hardesty), Michael Dillon, Jon Kurtin, Sol Gerber, and Donald Muckenthaler operating as KVHP-TV Partners. KVHP became a charter affiliate of the upstart Fox Broadcasting Company on October 9, 1986. In 1996, National Communications purchased KVHP from KVHP-TV Partners.

In 2003, KVHP established a low-power repeater station for the Beaumont area, KUIL-LP (channel 64), which served as the Fox affiliate for southeast Texas and held a secondary affiliation with UPN (KUIL-LP lost its Fox affiliation to KBTV-TV in January 2009 and became a MyNetworkTV affiliate). KVHP also operated another Texas-based repeater, KVHP-LD (channel 44) in Jasper; in March 2011, KVHP-LD ceased to serve as a translator of KVHP and began relaying programming from Beaumont ABC affiliate KBMT.

On July 28, 2009, KVHP began carrying programming from The CW on digital subchannel 29.2 (which had simulcast the main channel's programming in standard-definition prior to joining the network), after KVHP owner National Communications assumed promotional and advertising control of cable-only CW Plus affiliate "WBLC" from Suddenlink Communications. This was moved to KPLC's second subchannel on August 31, 2017, so that KVHP could launch Lake Charles' first standalone ABC affiliate, under the branding "SWLA ABC". Prior to this move, Lafayette's KATC served as Lake Charles' default ABC station, although some area cable and satellite providers also carried other nearby ABC affiliates, such as KBMT from Beaumont or KLAX-TV from Alexandria. The new channel returns the network to the market 53 years after KPLC dropped its secondary ABC affiliation.

On March 10, 2016, National Communications, Inc. agreed to sell KVHP to KVHP License Subsidiary, LLC (a subsidiary of American Spirit Media) for $2 million. American Spirit Media entered into a shared services agreement and studio lease agreement with Raycom Media (owner of local NBC affiliate KPLC) to operate KVHP when the acquisition was completed. The application was accepted for filing on March 18 by the Federal Communications Commission; the sale was completed on August 15, 2016.

Gray Media announced on July 1, 2026, that it would buy American Spirit Media's six stations, including KPLC, for $50 million; the deal is permissible because of the 2025 federal appeals court decision Zimmer Radio of Mid-Missouri v. FCC, which struck down limitations on one company owning two of the top four stations in a market.

=== Effects of Hurricanes Laura and Delta ===
KPLC and KVHP began airing continuous coverage of Hurricane Laura on August 25, 2020, from their studio facility in Lake Charles. The personnel of both stations evacuated to the facilities of Baton Rouge sister station WAFB in the afternoon hours of August 26, as mandatory evacuations for the city of Lake Charles had been issued ahead of the hurricane's landfall. On August 27, the hurricane made landfall in Cameron, Louisiana; the KPLC/KVHP studio transmitter link tower collapsed shortly after landfall, resulting in severe damage to the studio building and taking both stations out of commission. While KPLC was able to resume operations from the facilities of WAFB after the hurricane, KVHP was forced to remain silent due to the lack of an alternate tower; Fox thus provided a Foxnet-like national feed to local cable providers until KVHP resumed operations at the end of 2020, and KPLC simulcast KVHP's Fox feed on channel 7.5 and ABC feed on channel 7.4.

== Newscasts and local programming ==
KVHP aired news capsules and newscasts for a time during the late 1980s and early 1990s, before dropping them for a number of years. The station began airing local newscast once again in 1999, when it established an in-house news department and began producing a prime time newscast at 9 p.m. Within a year of the news department's launch, the station expanded its news programming and began producing a two-hour morning show and an hour-long 5 p.m. newscast. KVHP's newscasts were never considered a serious threat to the ratings dominance of NBC affiliate KPLC and by 2004, KVHP's news department was shut down with local news dropped from the station's lineup entirely.

Soon afterward, the station's only locally produced program consisted of a half-hour public affairs program called On the Air with Fox 29, which aired twice on Sundays and has since been canceled. On April 27, 2009, KVHP began broadcasting a tape-delay of Baton Rouge ABC affiliate WBRZ's weeknight 6 p.m. newscast, under the repackaged title Fox 29 News from the Capital at 9 p.m. on Monday through Friday evenings; the WBRZ rebroadcast was dropped in 2011.

On May 7, 2012, KVHP reinstated an in-house news department with the launch of a half-hour midday newscast at noon on weekdays (later titled Fox 29 News Express). On February 29, 2016, the station premiered a 30-minute evening newscast, Fox 29 News at 9, following Fox's prime time lineup. The standalone newscast was short lived, as KVHP's news operations were taken over by KPLC after American Spirit Media acquired the station in late 2016.

KVHP-DT2 did not simulcast any newscasts from either KPLC or KVHP during its time as a CW affiliate, but began simulcasting KPLC's morning, 5 p.m., and 10 p.m. newscasts when it joined ABC on August 31, 2017. In October 2017, it began airing a KPLC-produced 6:30 p.m. newscast, which is exclusive to KVHP-DT2.

== Technical information ==
=== Subchannels ===
The station's signal is multiplexed:

Subchannels of KVHP
Subchannel	Res.	Short name	Programming
29.1	720p	KVHP	Fox
29.2	720p	ABC	ABC
29.3	480i	Nosey	Nosey
29.4	480i	UNIVSN	Univision
29.5	480i	IONPLUS	Ion Plus
29.6	480i	MOVIESG	MovieSphere Gold

=== Analog-to-digital conversion ===
KVHP shut down its analog signal, over UHF channel 29, on June 12, 2009, the official date on which full-power television stations in the United States transitioned from analog to digital broadcasts under federal mandate. The station's digital signal remained on its pre-transition UHF channel 30, using virtual channel 29. Effective December 11, 2018, KVHP was licensed to move from channel 30 to channel 18 for the spectrum reallocation.
