= KLFY-TV =

Television station in Lafayette, Louisiana

- Lafayette, Louisiana; United States
- Channels: Digital: 10 (VHF); Virtual: 10
- Branding: KLFY 10; KLFY News 10; Acadiana's CW (10.2)

Programming
- Affiliations: 10.1: CBS; 10.2: The CW Plus; for others, see § Subchannels

Ownership
- Owner: Nexstar Media Group; (Nexstar Media Inc.)

History
- First air date: June 3, 1955
- Former channel numbers: Analog: 10 (VHF, 1955–2009); Digital: 56 (UHF, until 2009)
- Former affiliations: ABC (secondary, 1955–1962)
- Call sign meaning: Lafayette; derived from former sister station KLFY radio (now KPEL)

Technical information
- Licensing authority: FCC
- Facility ID: 35059
- ERP: 20.3 kW
- HAAT: 527 m (1,729 ft)
- Transmitter coordinates: 30°19′20″N 92°16′59″W

Links
- Public license information: Public file; LMS
- Website: www.klfy.com

KLFY-TV (channel 10) is a television station in Lafayette, Louisiana, United States, affiliated with CBS and The CW. Owned by Nexstar Media Group, the station has studios on Eraste Landry Road in Lafayette, and its transmitter is located in Maxie, north of Rayne.

KLFY-TV is notable as the oldest television station in the Lafayette area.

The station is also carried on cable and satellite providers in the Lake Charles metro area and Southwest Louisiana, where it previously served as the market's default CBS affiliate until February 15, 2017, when KSWL-LD signed on as the first CBS affiliate in the area since the sign-off of KTAG-TV in 1961, as well as over-the-air in most of the Baton Rouge and Alexandria viewing areas. KLFY also served as one of two default CBS affiliates for the Alexandria market (along with KNOE-TV) of Monroe until local NBC affiliate KALB-TV launched a CBS affiliate on its subchannel in 2006. Until mid-2015, KLFY was carried on Suddenlink cable in Alexandria concurrently with CBS affiliate KALB-DT2.

== History ==
The station began broadcasting on June 3, 1955. Owned by Camellia Broadcasting at the time alongside KLFY radio (AM 1420, now KPEL), it was intended to share time on channel 10 with KVOL-TV, owned at the time by the Morgan Murphy Stations along with KVOL, KVOL-FM (96.1, off-air and moved to Lake Charles by 1976), and The Daily Advertiser. However, prior to the station's launch, KVOL's owners decided to yield the channel's operations to Camellia Broadcasting; Morgan Murphy later filed an interest to broadcast on channel 3, but this was denied. Its original studio facilities were located on Jefferson Street in downtown Lafayette. It has always been a CBS affiliate, though it aired some ABC programming until KATC signed on in 1962. During the late 1950s, the station was also briefly affiliated with the NTA Film Network. In 1965, Camellia Broadcasting sold KLFY to Texoma Broadcasters, which owned KWTX-TV in Waco, Texas, and was partially owned by Lyndon B. Johnson along with businessman Milford N. "Buddy" Bostick. The station currently operates out of newer, larger purpose-built studio facilities on Eraste Landry Road, on the city's south side. KLFY was the first station in Lafayette and one of the earliest in Louisiana to broadcast in stereo, launching stereo broadcasting in mid-1986.

KLFY logo used from 1998 until December 27, 2011. The "10" had been used since 1974, with the hurricane eye surround motif added in 1982.

Young Broadcasting acquired the station from Texoma Broadcasters in 1988. Young, and KLFY with it, was sold to Media General in 2013. This marked Media General's return to Louisiana after selling Alexandria NBC affiliate KALB-TV to Hoak Media in 2008.

After an aborted merger plan with Meredith Corporation, Media General announced on January 27, 2016, that it was being acquired by Nexstar Broadcasting Group with the new company named "Nexstar Media Group". As Nexstar had already owned KADN-TV and since the Lafayette market is too small to allow duopolies in any case, in order to comply with FCC ownership rules as well as planned changes to rules regarding same-market television stations which would prohibit future joint sales agreements, the company was required to sell either KLFY or KADN to another company. NBC affiliate KLAF-LD, KADN-TV's sister station, was the only station involved in the deal that could have been legally acquired, since FCC rules allow for common ownership of full-power and low-power television stations, regardless of the number of stations in a market. However, four months later, Nexstar agreed to sell KADN and KLAF-LD to Bayou City Broadcasting, allowing it to retain KLFY.

Upon being acquired by Nexstar, the station upgraded its set and look. It has retained the "Hello Acadiana" greeting as well as the morning newscast title Passe Partout. However, in November 2017, the station dropped its hurricane eye logo it has used for over four decades, has renamed its noon newscast (formerly titled Meet Your Neighbor) to KLFY News 10 at Noon, and has changed its news theme to Stephen Arnold Music's "Canvas", which was and is still used by numerous former Media General stations.

On September 23, 2024, KLFY became the Lafayette market's third affiliate of The CW once its contract with KATC expired, as part of a plan for Nexstar to carry the network on more of its owned and operated stations. The CW replaced Dabl on subchannel 10.2.

== News operation ==
Former news open

KLFY-TV broadcasts to and gathers news from throughout the South Central Louisiana area, a region known as "Acadiana". This includes the parishes (counties) of Lafayette, Saint Martin, Saint Landry, Evangeline, Acadia, Vermilion, Iberia, Saint Mary, and Jefferson Davis. Many of the station's branding campaigns and slogans use the moniker "Acadiana", such as "Hello Acadiana", which was adopted in 1982 along with the Frank Gari news theme "Hello News", which KLFY used from 1982 until 2004.

KLFY logo from 2011 through 2017

KLFY is well known in the market for its local morning show, Passe Partout–derived from the French word for "all-purpose". It has been on the air for over half a century (since 1957), and is one of the longest-running programs of its kind in the country. The station's noon show, KLFY 10 News at Noon, has been on the air for almost as long; it was formerly known as Meet Your Neighbor. The two programs are typically accompanied by paid live remotes promoting local car dealers, furniture stores and other commercial businesses. KLFY's weather department utilizes the "Live Doppler 10 Stormtracker" title for live up to date weather forecasts and branding. Weather coverage is featured prominently throughout station branding promotions.

In Lafayette, KLFY ranked first in viewership throughout most of its early history. This changed in the early-to-mid-2000s when a resurgent KATC began to attract viewers away from KLFY with different news formats and by luring various well-known talent from KLFY.

On December 28, 2011, KLFY became the first television station in the Lafayette market to begin broadcasting its local newscasts in high definition. In May 2013, the longtime Eyewitness News name in use since 1969 was dropped for Acadiana's Multi-Media News; it has since been replaced by simply KLFY News 10. Upon being acquired by Nexstar, KLFY began producing and airing a weekend sports program Cajun Nation, focusing on sporting events from UL Lafayette, and airs Geaux Nation, focusing on athletic events from LSU, that is produced by sister station WVLA in Baton Rouge.

=== Former on-air staff ===
- Rob Johnson (later at WBBM-TV in Chicago)

== Technical information ==
=== Subchannels ===
The station's signal is multiplexed:

Subchannels of KLFY-TV
Channel	Res.	Short name	Programming
10.1	1080i	KLFY-HD	CBS
10.2	720p	CW+	The CW Plus
10.3	480i	ION	Ion
10.4	480i	Mystery	Ion Mystery

=== Analog-to-digital conversion ===
KLFY-TV shut down its analog signal, over VHF channel 10, on June 12, 2009, the official date on which full-power television stations in the United States transitioned from analog to digital broadcasts under federal mandate. The station's digital signal relocated from its pre-transition UHF channel 56, which was among the high band UHF channels (52–69) that were removed from broadcasting use as a result of the transition, to its former analog-era VHF channel 10.

In June 2012, Young Broadcasting signed on the Live Well Network to its stations including KLFY. On May 29, 2015, the Live Well Network was pulled off the air on all Media General Stations (including the former Young ones). Media General launched Ion Television on KLFY on November 11, 2015, as part of a deal on their stations where there was no stand-alone Ion channel in those markets. On November 16, 2015, KLFY began running a signal test on 10.2 (formerly Live Well Network) with GetTV launching as the subchannel replacing the defunct Live Well Network. According to an article on TV Newscheck's website, Media General signed an agreement to launch GetTV on 20 of its stations, including KLFY, beginning February 1, 2016. On October 30, 2017, Nexstar launched a fourth subchannel on 10.4, adding Katz Broadcasting's Laff network. On February 2, 2021, KLFY-DT2 dropped GetTV (now on KDCG-CD 22.2) and replaced it with Dabl.
