= Louisiana Public Broadcasting =

PBS member network serving Louisiana

- Statewide Louisiana (except Greater New Orleans); United States
- Branding: LPB PBS; Louisiana Public Broadcasting (productions until early-mid 2000s)

Programming
- Affiliations: .1: PBS; .2: PBS Kids; .3: Create

Ownership
- Owner: Louisiana Educational Television Authority

History
- First air date: September 6, 1975

Links
- Website: www.lpb.org
- For technical information, see § Stations.

Louisiana Public Broadcasting (LPB) is a state network of PBS member television stations serving the U.S. state of Louisiana. The stations are operated by the Louisiana Educational Television Authority, an agency created by the executive department of the Louisiana state government which holds the licenses for six of the seven PBS member stations licensed in the state. Louisiana Public Broadcasting's studio facilities and offices are located on Perkins Road in Baton Rouge.

The network serves most of the state outside Greater New Orleans. That market's PBS member station, WYES-TV (channel 12), is the only PBS station in Louisiana that is not associated with LPB; a noncommercial independent station there, WLAE-TV (channel 32), is part-owned by LPB in order to provide the market with the state network's news and public affairs programming.

== History ==
Louisiana became one of the first states in the Deep South with an educational television station licensed to the state when KLSE signed on from Monroe on March 1, 1957. Louisiana State University professor Lucille Woodward had urged Governor Robert Kennon to create an Educational Television Commission as part of the State Department of Education, and KLSE was intended as the first station in a statewide educational television network along the lines of Alabama Educational Television (now Alabama Public Television). However, KLSE signed off the air in 1964. For the next eleven years, the only area of the state with a clear signal from a National Educational Television or PBS station was New Orleans, which was served by WYES-TV. That station had signed on one month after KLSE, but was separately owned and operated.

Woodward continued to urge the Louisiana State Legislature not to drop the idea of educational television service in the state during the 1960s. Finally, in 1971, the recently created Louisiana Educational Television Authority approved the money to build and sign on the stations. On September 6, 1975, WLPB-TV in Baton Rouge debuted as the state's first PBS member station outside New Orleans. Five more stations launched throughout the state, extending LPB's signal to portions of Arkansas, Mississippi and Texas: KLTM-TV in Monroe signed on in September 1976, followed by KLTS-TV in Shreveport in August 1978, KLPB-TV in Lafayette, KLTL-TV in Lake Charles in May 1981 and finally, KLPA-TV in Alexandria in July 1983.

In 1985, Shreveport native and longtime Baton Rouge resident Beth Courtney was named president and CEO of Louisiana Public Broadcasting, a capacity she remained until her retirement in January 2022.

LPB began broadcasting in stereo in 1990. In 2001, LPB launched a cable-only channel, LPB Kids & You, on cable channel 11 in Baton Rouge. The channel, a predecessor to LPB 2, aired children's programming during prime time (atypical for PBS stations, which normally air children's programs only during the daytime hours) and adult and creative programs during the daytime hours. When PBS You and PBS Kids ceased operations in 2005, the channel became LPB Plus and expanded its cable coverage to Lafayette. In 2008, the service changed its name to LPB 2.

Since 2009, Louisiana Public Broadcasting has added records of digitized audiovisual recordings to the American Archive of Public Broadcasting via external links to the Louisiana Digital Media Archive.

== Programming ==
Louisiana Public Broadcasting's flagship news program is Louisiana: The State We're In, which debuted in 1976. For nineteen years, political consultant, raconteur, and author Gus Weill hosted the acclaimed Louisiana Legends program on the state network. Among the original programs that LPB has produced includes Evangeline, which was broadcast by PBS stations throughout the United States and educational stations in Canada in 2000. A Taste of Louisiana and one of Justin Wilson's cooking series were also produced by LPB. LPB carries, as well as produces, programs distributed by PBS, American Public Television and other distributors.

In April 2016, LPB announced a content partnership with TFO, a French-language public broadcaster owned by the Canadian province of Ontario, under which it will supply fourteen hours per-week of French-language children's programming for airing on LPB2. The partnership is designed to appeal to Louisiana's strong French heritage and French immersion programs.

=== Hurricane coverage ===
During coverage of major hurricanes affecting the state (as has happened with Hurricanes Katrina in 2005 and Gustav in 2008), LPB's Baton Rouge facilities are used by New Orleans CBS affiliate WWL-TV (channel 4) as a backup studio to provide additional news coverage from the station inland, and act as the station's main set should WWL-TV be unable to broadcast from its Rampart Street facilities in New Orleans. As part of this agreement, WWL's coverage airs across the entire LPB network to provide a statewide conduit for news and information from a well-established news organization.

=== COVID-19 events ===
In response to the COVID-19 pandemic, LPB started "Learning@Home" in partnership with the Louisiana Department of Education. The goal is to help students in grades Pre-K through 12 stay at home more educated and productive.

== Stations ==
| Station | City of license | Channels (RF/VC) | First air date | Third and fourth letters of callsign meaning | ERP | HAAT | Facility ID | Transmitter coordinates | Public license information |
|---|---|---|---|---|---|---|---|---|---|
| WLPB-TV (Note: Flagship station) (Note: WLPB did not use the -TV suffix from 1980 to 1981.) | Baton Rouge | 25 (UHF); 27 | September 6, 1975 | Public Broadcasting | 355 kW | 308.8 m (1,013 ft) | 38586 | 30°22′22.7″N 91°12′16.4″W | Public file LMS |
| KLTM-TV (Note: KLTM did not use the -TV suffix until 1981.) | Monroe (El Dorado, AR/ Greenwood/ Greenville, MS) | 13 (VHF); 13 | September 8, 1976 | Television Monroe | 17.2 kW | 544 m (1,785 ft) | 38589 | 32°11′51″N 92°4′14″W | Public file LMS |
| KLTS-TV (Note: KLTS did not use the -TV suffix until 1981.) | Shreveport (Texarkana, TX–AR) | 17 (UHF); 24 | August 9, 1978 | Television Shreveport | 350 kW; 550 kW (CP) | 326 m (1,070 ft); 325.8 m (1,069 ft) (CP) | 38591 | 32°40′40.1″N 93°55′30.7″W | Public file LMS |
| KLPB-TV (Note: KLPB did not use the -TV suffix during its construction permit from 1979 to 1981.) | Lafayette | 23 (UHF); 24 | May 13, 1981 | Public Broadcasting | 137.4 kW | 463.2 m (1,520 ft) | 38588 | 30°19′20″N 92°16′59″W | Public file LMS |
| KLTL-TV | Lake Charles (Beaumont/ Port Arthur/ Orange, TX) (Note: KLTL is carried on some cable providers in the extreme eastern portion of the Beaumont–Port Arthur–Orange market, which lacks a PBS member station of its own; most of the market (corresponding to the cities of Beaumont and Port Arthur) receives the network's programming on cable via Houston member station KUHT.) | 20 (UHF); 18 | May 5, 1981 | Television Lake Charles | 131.4 kW | 299.1 m (981 ft) | 38587 | 30°23′46.7″N 93°0′3.5″W | Public file LMS |
| KLPA-TV (Note: KLPA did not use the -TV suffix during its construction permit from 1980 to 1981.) | Alexandria (Vidalia/Natchez, MS) | 33 (UHF); 25 | July 1, 1983 | Public Alexandria | 572 kW | 412.6 m (1,354 ft) | 38590 | 31°33′57″N 92°32′51″W | Public file LMS |

== Technical information ==
=== Subchannels ===
The stations' digital channels are multiplexed:

LPB multiplex
| Subchannel | Res. | Short name | Programming |
|---|---|---|---|
| x.1 | 1080i | LPBHD | PBS |
| x.2 | 480i | LPB Kids | PBS Kids |
| x.3 | 480i | LPB3 | Create |

=== Analog-to-digital conversion ===
Louisiana Public Broadcasting's stations shut down their analog signals at 7:00 a.m. on June 12, 2009, the official date on which full-power television stations in the United States transitioned from analog to digital broadcasts under federal mandate. The stations' digital channel allocations post-transition are as follows:

- WLPB-TV shut down its analog signal, over UHF channel 27; the station's digital signal remained on its pre-transition UHF channel 25, using virtual channel 27.
- KLTM-TV shut down its analog signal, over VHF channel 13; the station's digital signal relocated from its pre-transition UHF channel 19 to VHF channel 13.
- KLTS-TV shut down its analog signal, over UHF channel 24; the station's digital signal remained on its pre-transition UHF channel 25, using virtual channel 24.
- KLPB-TV shut down its analog signal, over UHF channel 23; the station's digital signal remained on its pre-transition UHF channel 24, using virtual channel 23.
- KLTL-TV shut down its analog signal, over UHF channel 18; the station's digital signal remained on its pre-transition UHF channel 20, using virtual channel 18.
- KLPA-TV shut down its analog signal, over UHF channel 26; the station's digital signal remained on its pre-transition UHF channel 25, using virtual channel 26.

As a result of the FCC spectrum auction, KLPA-TV and KLTS were to change channels in their respective markets again; KLTS will be on channel 17, and KLPA-TV is now on channel 33.

== See also ==
- Louisiana Digital Media Archive
- American Archive of Public Broadcasting
