= KNEK (AM) =

Coordinates: 30°35′9.71″N 92°04′0.43″W

Former simulcast of KNEK-FM

Washington, Louisiana; United States
- Broadcast area: Lafayette metropolitan area
- Frequency: 1190 kHz
- Branding: Magic 104.7 KNEK

Programming
- Format: Urban adult contemporary
- Affiliations: Premiere Networks

Ownership
- Owner: Cumulus Media; (Radio License Holding CBC, LLC)
- Sister stations: KNEK-FM, KRRQ, KSMB, KXKC

History
- First air date: August 18, 1980
- Last air date: May 2023

Technical information
- Licensing authority: FCC
- Facility ID: 15801
- Class: D
- Power: 250 watts day

Links
- Public license information: Public file; LMS

KNEK (1190 AM) was a radio station in Washington, Louisiana, United States, under ownership of Cumulus Media. The station simulcast sister station KNEK-FM, which broadcasts on the frequency of 104.7 FM. Its studios were located on Galbert Road in Lafayette, and its transmitter was located south of Washington, Louisiana. Because it shared the same frequency as clear-channel station XEWK-AM at Guadalajara, Jalisco, Mexico, KNEK only operated during the daytime hours.

== History ==
KNEK started in August 1980 as a daytime-only, country music–formatted station, the first new AM outlet in the area since the 1940s.

In 1994, KNEK AM dropped its then-current format of gospel music and adopted an all-zydeco format, the only one of its kind. The format was dropped in 1998, a year after Citywide Broadcasting of Lafayette bought the station from Dee Broadcasting; the new owners locked out the old disc jockeys and changed the format to satellite-delivered Motown music.

Citadel Broadcasting acquired all of Citywide's stations in the Baton Rouge and Lafayette markets for $34 million in late 1998. In 2006, Citadel placed KNEK-FM in The Last Bastion Station Trust, LLC, upon its 2006 merger with ABC Radio. Citadel swapped KRDJ with KNEK-FM in 2008, opting to keep the latter. Citadel merged with Cumulus Media on September 16, 2011.

The station went off the air in May 2023 due to transmitter issues. Cumulus Media would surrender the KNEK license to the Federal Communications Commission (FCC) in March 2024. The FCC canceled the station's license on April 26, 2024.
