= KOGM =

- Opelousas, Louisiana; United States
- Broadcast area: Lafayette, Louisiana
- Frequency: 107.1 MHz
- Branding: Mustang 107.1

Programming
- Format: Classic Country

Ownership
- Owner: Delta Media Corporation; (KSLO Broadcasting Co.)
- Sister stations: KXKW-LP, KXKW-LD, KSLO-FM, KSLO, KLWB-FM, KYMK-FM, KFXZ, KFXZ-FM, KVOL, KDCG-CD, KLWB

History
- First air date: 1965

Technical information
- Licensing authority: FCC
- Facility ID: 33220
- Class: A
- ERP: 990 watts
- HAAT: 249.9 meters (820 ft)
- Transmitter coordinates: 30°20′32.00″N 91°57′46.00″W

Links
- Public license information: Public file; LMS
- Webcast: Listen Live
- Website: mustang1071.com

KOGM (107.1 FM) is an American radio station licensed to Opelousas, Louisiana, United States, and serving the Lafayette area. The station is currently owned by Delta Media Company. KOGM's studios are located on Evangeline Thruway in Carencro, and its transmitter is located northeast of Lafayette.

== History ==
On June 12, 2012, KOGM changed their format from classic hits (as "Kool 107.1") to hot adult contemporary, branded as "Mix 107.1".

On August 1, 2014, KOGM flipped to a simulcast of Classic Country KXKW-LP as Mustang 87.7/107.1.

On November 1, 2015, KOGM rebranded as "Mustang 107.1", after dropping the simulcast with KXKW-LP.
