= KXKW =

KXKW may refer to:

- KXKW-LP, a low-power television station (channel 6) licensed to serve Lafayette, Louisiana, United States
- KXKW-LD, a low-power television station (channel 30, virtual 32) licensed to serve Lafayette, Louisiana
- KSLO-FM, a radio station (105.3 FM) licensed to serve Simmesport, Louisiana, which held the call sign KXKW from 2008 to 2011
- KFXZ (AM), a radio station (1520 AM) licensed to serve Lafayette, Louisiana, which held the call sign KXKW from 1960 to 1990
