= KPEL =

KPEL may refer to:

- KPEL (AM), a radio station (1420 AM) licensed to Lafayette, Louisiana, United States
- KPEL-FM, a radio station (96.5 FM) licensed to Breaux Bridge, Louisiana, United States
