= KNEK =

KNEK may refer to:

- KNEK-FM, a radio station (104.7 FM) licensed to Lafayette, Louisiana, United States
- KNEK (AM), a radio station (1190 AM) licensed to Washington, Louisiana, United States
