= KLFT =

KLFT may refer to:

- KLFT (FM), a radio station (90.5 FM) licensed to serve Kaplan, Louisiana, United States
- KXKW-LP, a low-power television station (channel 6) licensed to serve Lafayette, Louisiana, formerly known as KLFT-LP
- Lafayette Regional Airport (ICAO code KLFT)
