= KFXZ =

KFXZ may refer to:

- KFXZ (AM), a radio station (1520 AM) licensed to Lafayette, Louisiana, United States
- KFXZ-FM, a radio station (105.9 FM) licensed to Opelousas, Louisiana, United States
