= KSLO =

KSLO may refer to:

- KSLO (AM), a radio station (1230 AM) licensed to serve Opelousas, Louisiana, United States
- KSLO-FM, a radio station (105.3 FM) licensed to serve Simmesport, Louisiana
