= KLWB =

KLWB may refer to:

- KLWB (TV), a television station (channel 17, virtual 50) licensed to serve New Iberia, Louisiana, United States
- KLWB-FM, a radio station (103.7 FM) licensed to serve Carencro, Louisiana
- Greenbrier Valley Airport (ICAO code KLWB
