= KVOL =

Radio station in Lafayette, Louisiana

Lafayette, Louisiana; United States
- Broadcast area: Acadiana
- Frequency: 1330 kHz
- Branding: 97.7/1330 MeTV FM

Programming
- Format: Oldies
- Affiliations: Compass Media Networks

Ownership
- Owner: Charles Chatelain; (Delta Media Corporation)
- Sister stations: KLWB-FM, KSLO-FM, KSLO, KOGM, KFXZ-FM, KFXZ, KYMK, KLCJ

History
- First air date: May 18, 1935
- Former call signs: KVOL (1935–1986); KRKR (1986–1989)
- Call sign meaning: K Voice Of Lafayette

Technical information
- Licensing authority: FCC
- Facility ID: 9415
- Class: B
- Power: 5,000 watts day 1,000 watts night
- Transmitter coordinates: 30°14′29″N 92°03′31″W
- Translator: 97.7 K249EY (Lafayette)

Links
- Public license information: Public file; LMS
- Webcast: Listen Live
- Website: kvol1330.com

KVOL (1330 AM) is an American radio station licensed to Lafayette, Louisiana, United States. It serves the Acadiana area. KVOL was the first radio station in Lafayette when they signed on-air on May 18, 1935. It is owned and operated by Delta Media Corporation. KVOL's studios are located on Evangeline Thruway in Carencro, and its transmitter is located in west Lafayette.

== History ==
The Evangeline Broadcasting Co. obtained a license from the Federal Communications Commission to establish a radio station at frequency 1330 on the AM band in Lafayette, where there were none at the time, in early 1935. The station was assigned the call letters KVOL and officially signed on for the first time on May 18, 1935 with a programming schedule of live music by local artists and news. The original station studios were in a downtown hotel, the Evangeline on Jefferson Street. KVOL reported on the start of the Second World War on September 1, 1939, when Adolf Hitler ordered his Nazi German troops to invade Poland, and broadcast then-President Franklin D. Roosevelt's radio address on December 9, 1941 announcing the United States' entry into the war. It promoted local involvement in the national war effort throughout the war, including war-bond drives, relief programs and blackout announcements. In 1944, KVOL joined the NBC Radio Network as a primary affiliate.

During the 1950s, 1960s and 1970s, KVOL served as a Top 40 radio station for the Lafayette area. It employed the area's first Black disc jockey, Paul Thibeaux, who helped make it the number-one AM station in the area by ratings. In the 1950s it also produced and distributed a pamphlet of "Household Hints" for local housewives as an advertisement for the station. In 1986, the station changed its call letters to KRKR, but this change only lasted three years before it reverted back to the original calls in 1989. It also moved its studios to the present location on the Evangeline Thruway (Interstate Highway 49) in the suburb of Carencro.

In the 1990s and since 2001, KVOL has focused on oldies music programming, most recently branded as "The Rewind." During the FCC's AM Revitalization project in mid-2016, Delta Media purchased 99.9 W260CK in Slidell from Educational Media Foundation, intending to relocate it to Lafayette as a KVOL repeater at 97.7 FM. The move was completed and the newly rechristened K249EY signed on, relaying KVOL from its new location September 5, 2016.

On March 7, 2022, KVOL changed from the Rewind to MeTV-FM and dropped the 104.1 FM simulcast.

== Programming ==
KVOL is a soft oldies formatted radio station known as "97.7/1330 MeTV FM". MeTV FM focuses on "The Greatest Hits of All Time" from 1965 to 1985. Feature programming also includes "On The Turntable", a weekly program that features a historic look at classic vinyl albums and played in their entirety. The Rewind also airs Scott Shannon presents America's Greatest Hits each Sunday morning at 9 am, The Blue Suede Connection each Saturday morning at 7 am, and The Beatles Brunch each Sunday morning at 10 am.

== Previous logo ==
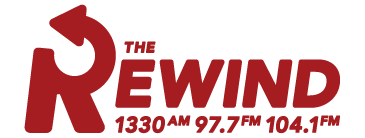
