= KTDY =

Radio station in Lafayette, Louisiana

Coordinates: 30.202°N 91.777°W

Lafayette, Louisiana; United States
- Broadcast area: Lafayette, Louisiana; Baton Rouge, Louisiana
- Frequency: 99.9 MHz (HD Radio)
- Branding: 99.9 KTDY

Programming
- Format: Adult contemporary
- Affiliations: Premiere Networks

Ownership
- Owner: Townsquare Media; (Townsquare Media of Lafayette, LLC)
- Sister stations: KFTE, KHXT, KMDL, KPEL, KPEL-FM, KROF

History
- First air date: September 15, 1966
- Former call signs: KPEL-FM (1966–1977)
- Call sign meaning: "Acadiana's Today Radio"

Technical information
- Licensing authority: FCC
- Facility ID: 12674
- Class: C
- ERP: 100,000 watts
- HAAT: 300 meters (980 ft)

Links
- Public license information: Public file; LMS
- Webcast: Listen live
- Website: 999ktdy.com

KTDY (99.9 FM) is an adult contemporary music formatted radio station in the Lafayette/Acadiana market in Louisiana, United States, owned by Townsquare Media. Its studios are located on Bertrand Road in Lafayette, and its transmitter, shared with KHXT and KXKC, is located north of St. Martinville, Louisiana. The station's 100,000-watt signal allows it to be picked up clearly 24/7 in Baton Rouge, 55 miles to the east, and Lake Charles, 70 miles to the west.

== History ==
KTDY signed on on September 15, 1966 as KPEL-FM, and was at first a beautiful music simulcast of sister station 1420/KPEL. In the early 1970s, due to Federal Communications Commission (FCC) regulations discouraging full AM/FM simulcasts, KPEL-FM began programming a Progressive Rock format in the overnight hours, retaining the beautiful music format during the day. Eventually, KPEL-FM changed its calls to KTDY in early 1977, and the progressive format was expanded to broadcast the entire day. In 1979, KTDY began testing a three-hour nightly disco format called "the Electric Disco." The disco experiment lasted only a year before KTDY shifted to become Acadiana's first FM Top 40/CHR station under their moniker as "The New KTDY FM 100, Today's Radio!". In short of weeks the new KTDY was beating KSMB by four years. The Disco show lives on Friday mornings in an all-request show titled "The Polyester Power Hour" (or Poly Po Ho, for short). After KSMB switched to their new & improved top 40/CHR format in October 1984, the two stations were engaged in a heated format competition until KTDY shifted from CHR to their now legendary AC format as "The All New Magic 100 KTDY" in 1986.

Since shifting to AC, KTDY has tweaked the format back and forth from mainstream AC to oldies-based Soft AC in the early 1990s to Hot AC in 1998, then back to AC in 2000.

KTDY at one point aired American Top 40 with Casey Kasem, King Biscuit Flower Hour, The Record Report and The Special Of The Week with Robert W. Morgan, Scan, Powerline, Earth News, Dr. Demento, Off The Record with Mary Turner, 60 Second LP, and in the early days of the station a strange daily comedy serial called Kremmin of the Star Corps which turns out was created by well known BBC Radio 1's on air personality Kenny Everett. Currently The Polyester Power Hour is the blockbuster on Friday mornings with CJ. KTDY launched their app in 2017.

== HD Radio ==
An Ibiquity-licensed station, KTDY began broadcasting HD Radio in August 2007. KTDY was the first commercial station in the Acadiana market to do so, and was the second overall, after KRVS. Currently, KTDY does not multicast. However the DJs have reported that multicast is coming (date and how it will be used is unknown at this time).

== Current on-air staff ==
The morning show was hosted by CJ Clements and Debbie Ray until late 2018, when Debbie Ray retired. She was replaced temporarily by Emily J, who has since relocated with her husband due to a military transfer. In August 2019, it became CJ And Ellen In The Morning, until CJ's departure in early 2023. The new morning show is now hosted by Chris Reed (previously on KHXT) and Bernadette Lee. The midday show is hosted by Michelle Heart. The afternoon show was hosted by JayCee, who in 2013 was tagged by The American Lung Association as Southwest Regional's "Volunteer of the Year", until his departure in early 2023. The evening show is hosted by the iconic Delilah starting at 7:00 p.m.
