= KMDL =

Coordinates: 30.049°N 91.997°W

- Kaplan, Louisiana; United States
- Broadcast area: Lafayette metropolitan area
- Frequency: 97.3 MHz (HD Radio)
- Branding: 97.3 The Dawg

Programming
- Format: Country
- Affiliations: Compass Media Networks; New Orleans Saints Radio Network

Ownership
- Owner: Townsquare Media; (Townsquare Media of Lafayette, LLC)
- Sister stations: KFTE, KHXT, KPEL, KPEL-FM, KROF, KTDY

History
- First air date: August 1, 1981; 44 years ago
- Call sign meaning: K-Middle (original branding)

Technical information
- Licensing authority: FCC
- Facility ID: 59289
- Class: C2
- ERP: 38,000 watts
- HAAT: 171 meters (561 ft)

Links
- Public license information: Public file; LMS
- Webcast: Listen Live
- Website: 973thedawg.com

KMDL (97.3 FM, "97.3 The Dawg") is a commercial radio station in Lafayette, Louisiana. It airs a country music format and is owned by Townsquare Media. Its studios are located on Bertrand Road in Lafayette, and its transmitter is off Guillot Road in Youngsivlle.

The station is an affiliate of the New Orleans Saints Radio Network.

== History ==
KMDL began broadcasting August 1, 1981, at 97.7 MHz. When it signed on, it had a 3,000 watt signal, a fraction of its current output. It concentrated on Kaplan-area listeners with a signal that was hard to hear in Lafayette. In 1991, in an effort to serve listeners in the more lucrative Lafayette radio market, KMDL upgraded to 40,000 watts and relocated to 97.5 MHz. The move lasted for a short time, however, as interference forced the station to return to 97.7 until it was found that the station could move to 97.3 interference-free.

KMDL has been playing country music since first signing on as "K-Middle," in reference to 97.7 appearing in the middle of the FM dial on an analog radio. After relocating to 97.3, KMDL dropped the "K-Middle" branding and identified only using its frequency and call letters. It later shifted from a traditional country format to a current hit-based country sound in September 1995. It began identifying as "the Dawg," a reference to the University of Louisiana at Lafayette's Bulldog mascot. (The university has since switched its sports teams' names to the Louisiana Ragin' Cajuns.)

== HD radio ==
An Ibiquity-licensed station, KMDL began broadcasting using HD Radio technology in November 2007. Currently, KMDL does not offer additional subchannel programming.
