= KYFJ =

Coordinates: 30.339°N 91.523°W

- New Iberia, Louisiana; United States
- Broadcast area: Lafayette and Baton Rouge metropolitan areas
- Frequency: 93.7 MHz

Programming
- Format: Religious

Ownership
- Owner: Bible Broadcasting Network; (Bible Broadcasting Network, Incorporated)

History
- First air date: June 1992 (as KKZN)
- Former call signs: KKZN (1991-11/1992); KDEA (11/1992-2/1997); KTBT (2/1997-10/1998); KOOJ (10/1998-4/2005); KRDJ (4/2005-8/2014)
- Call sign meaning: Your Faith

Technical information
- Facility ID: 8167
- Class: C1
- ERP: 100,000 watts
- HAAT: 296 meters (971 ft)

Links
- Webcast: Listen Live
- Website: Official website

KYFJ is a radio station serving the Lafayette and Baton Rouge areas. The station broadcasts at 93.7 MHz with 100 kW and is licensed to New Iberia, Louisiana. KYFJ is currently under ownership of Bible Broadcasting Network. It was previously held by The Last Bastion Station Trust, LLC, who picked up this station after its previous owner Citadel Broadcasting swapped the station for KNEK-FM. The station's transmitter is located in the Atchafalaya Basin area in rural St. Martin Parish.

== History ==
=== Z-Rock, 1992 ===
KRDJ signed on in June 1992 as KKZN, an affiliate of the Z-Rock satellite network. KKZN was a Cavaness Broadcasting station, co-owned with what was then KVOL and KVOL-FM as the first FM duopoly in the Lafayette market; Z-Rock 93.7 was effectively the replacement of the rock format previously heard on KVOL-FM before that station flipped to Urban AC in July 1992. At the time, KKZN was broadcasting with 34 kilowatts from a tower located off Highway 90 in southern Iberia Parish between the towns of Jeanerette and Glencoe.

=== Adult contemporary, 1992–1997 ===
The rock format lasted only until November, when KKZN became KDEA, picking up the calls dropped in favor of KXKC by another New Iberia station earlier in the year. KDEA switched to hot adult contemporary as KD93.7 shortly afterward.

=== Urban/urban AC, 1997–1998 ===
In 1997, Cavaness Broadcasting sold KDEA, along with KVOL and KVOL-FM, to Baton Rouge-based Powell Broadcasting, who also owned KSMB. Also around that time, they applied to the Federal Communications Commission (FCC) to upgrade from 34 kilowatts to a full 100 kilowatts and relocate to a tower south of Maringouin, allowing the station to serve both the Lafayette and Baton Rouge radio markets. To prepare for the upgrade, the formats of KDEA and KVOL-FM were swapped in late January, with KVOL-FM becoming adult contemporary as "Star 105.9" and KDEA picking up the urban AC format. Once the signal upgrade was completed in February, KDEA's shifted its focus exclusively toward the Baton Rouge market and shifted to mainstream urban as "93-7 the Beat" KTBT, eventually shifting back to urban AC as "93-7 Jamz."

=== Oldies, 1998–2002 ===
In October 1998, KTBT was sold to Citadel Broadcasting, who had recently purchased a group of Baton Rouge stations that included KQXL, a more popular urban AC station. Shortly after the sale was completed, KTBT's urban AC format was abruptly ended and the station began stunting with Christmas music. The stunt lasted for three weeks before Citadel launched "Oldies 93.7" KOOJ with a '50s–'70s oldies format.

=== Rock/active rock, 2002–2005 ===
The oldies format lasted until KOOJ began airing a loop of "Hair of the Dog" by Nazareth and "Rock You Like a Hurricane" by the Scorpions on October 7, 2002—two days after much of the station's coverage area was hit by Hurricane Lili. On October 11, KOOJ launched a mainstream rock format as "Rock 93-7, Real Rock for Baton Rouge." The mainstream rock format was tweaked in 2004 to a more modern active rock presentation and the Lex & Terry morning show was added.

=== Variety hits, 2005–2007 ===
The active rock format came to an end at 5:00PM on April 28, 2005, when, after playing "Click Click Boom" by Saliva, KOOJ flipped to variety hits as "Red @ 93.7" under new callsign KRDJ. The first song on Red was "Start Me Up" by The Rolling Stones. The name was likely inspired by Baton Rouge being French for "red stick" (the liners even promoted the station as "broadcasting from our 5,000 foot big red stick in downtown Baton Rouge".)

=== Classic rock/active rock, 2007–2014 ===
On February 1, 2007, KRDJ moved its focus back to the Lafayette market and changed format to classic rock, recycling the "Rock 93.7" moniker and logo previously used by the station. Rock 93.7 launched with Opie and Anthony in the morning, but the show was dropped in October 2008 when the station shifted to its active rock format. Nick and Drew then held morning duties before moving to their assigned slot at night. Jace Edwards was brought in as Program Director and Morning Host. With his arrival, Rock 93.7 became more active in the community benefiting many organizations like Toys for Tots with the United States Marine Corps Reserves and Acadiana Outreach.

=== Future: Rock is over, BBN takes over ===
On June 6, 2014, RadioInsight reported that Last Bastion Trust sold KRDJ to Bible Broadcasting Network for $1,775,000. BBN will use 93.7 as a repeater for WYFQ in Charlotte, NC. The station ended its former format at 12:15 pm on August 1. On the last night of Rock 93.7, KRDJ played requests from the DJs of Rock 93.7. Morning DJ Jace Edwards and middayer Rach moved to similarly formatted KKGB, with the rest of the self-proclaimed "Rock Krewe" to reveal their new positions in the near future. They held a contest to text in the first word in the last song on Rock 93.7 (which was Losing My Religion by R.E.M.) and 937 to 63582 with the first person to text in (who was Monic Boulette of New Iberia) winning "everything that's left" of the station. Following that, 93.7 signed off. The station would remain off the air until repairs to the studio were finished in the Fall. The former staff on the station's Facebook page has flipped its logo upside down, also signifying the end of its format. The Facebook page was still online days after and posted on a regular basis, claiming "the rock doesn't stop when we're gone." As of late August, the link to the station's Facebook URL redirects to Facebook's newsfeed. On August 1, 2014, KRDJ changed its call sign to KYFJ. On December 18, 2014, KYFJ returned to the air with Bible Broadcasting Network's religious format.

== Former on-air staff ==
- Bob Laborde
- Jace Edwards (moved to KKGB)
- Rach (moved to KKGB)
- D-Man
- Big Kev
- TylerTyme
- Evil Dexter's Rock Lab
- OoLaLa
- SuperFreak
- Full Metal Jackie
- Poppa Voodoo
- K-Rox
- Sandman
- Mayhem
- Tasha Stevens
- Larry LeBlanc
- Richard Condon
- Vydra
- Sig
- Caroline Kennedy
- Frezno
- Bill Jackson
- Doc Brock
- Brian King
- Kevin Gallagher
- Darren Gauthier
- Chad Presley
- Bob Bishop
- Delaney

== Previous logo ==
(KRDJ's logo under previous classic rock format)
