= KYMK-FM =

Radio station in Maurice, Louisiana

Coordinates: 30.155472°N 92.108444°W

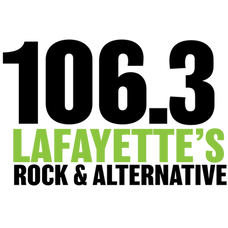
- Maurice, Louisiana; United States
- Broadcast area: Lafayette metropolitan area
- Frequency: 106.3 MHz
- Branding: 106.3 Radio Lafayette

Programming
- Format: Alternative rock
- Affiliations: Compass Media Networks

Ownership
- Owner: Delta Media Corporation
- Sister stations: KVOL, KFXZ, KFXZ-FM KLWB-FM, KOGM, KXKW-LD, KLWB KDCG-CD, KXKW-LP, KSLO-FM, KSLO

History
- First air date: 1985 (as KFXZ)
- Former call signs: KFXZ (1985–August 18, 2004); KFXZ-FM (August 18–26, 2004); KKSJ (August 26, 2004–2008)
- Call sign meaning: Jumbled representation of the word "Monkey" (former Hot AC branding)

Technical information
- Licensing authority: FCC
- Facility ID: 11605
- Class: A
- ERP: 2,100 watts
- HAAT: 105 meters (344 ft)

Links
- Public license information: Public file; LMS
- Webcast: Listen Live
- Website: 1063radiolafayette.com

KYMK-FM (106.3 MHz) is a commercial radio station located in Maurice, Louisiana, broadcasting to the Lafayette, Louisiana area. The station is owned by Delta Media Corporation. KYMK's studios are located on Evangeline Thruway in Carencro, and its transmitter is located southwest of Maurice in rural Vermilion Parish, Louisiana.

KYMK airs an alternative rock music format branded as "106.3 Radio Lafayette." Pittman flipped 106.3 to urban contemporary (as "The Juice 106.3") in 2009. Before that, they flipped to Hot AC from Jones Radio Networks' Smooth Jazz format on Friday, March 28, 2008. On March 31, the station officially switched calls from KKSJ to KYMK. As a smooth jazz-formatted station, KKSJ was branded as "Smooth Jazz 106".

Previous logo

== Current on-air staff ==
Leblanc - Mornings

Morgan Pierce - Middays and Homegrown (specialty show)

Brigette Rose - Afternoons

Clint Domingue - Weeknights and Saturdays

Tanya Ardoin - Sundays (specialty show)
