= KSMB =

KSMB may refer to:

- Kap Shui Mun Bridge, a cable-stayed bridge in Hong Kong
- KSMB (FM), a radio station (94.5 FM) licensed to Lafayette, Louisiana, United States
- KSMB (band), Swedish punk rock band
