= KKSJ =

KKSJ may refer to:

- KKSJ-LP, a low-power radio station (107.5 FM) licensed to serve Beloit, Kansas, United States
- KYMK-FM, a radio station (106.3 FM) licensed to serve Maurice, Louisiana, United States, which held the call sign KKSJ from 2004 to 2008
- KZSF, a radio station (1370 AM) licensed to serve San Jose, California, United States, which held the call sign KKSJ from 1993 to 1998
