= KFXZ (AM) =

Radio station in Lafayette, Louisiana

- Lafayette, Louisiana; United States
- Frequency: 1520 kHz
- Branding: News Talk 98.5 FM, 1520 AM

Programming
- Format: News/talk
- Affiliations: Louisiana Radio Network; Compass Media Networks; Genesis Communications Network; Premiere Networks

Ownership
- Owner: Charles Chatelain; (Delta Media Corporation)
- Sister stations: KVOL; KYMK-FM; KFXZ-FM; KLWB-FM; KOGM; KXKW-LD; KLWB; KDCG-CD; KXKW-LP; KSLO-FM; KSLO

History
- First air date: 1960
- Former call signs: KXKW (1960–1990); KINF (1990); KACY (1990–1996); KDYS (1996–2004)

Technical information
- Licensing authority: FCC
- Facility ID: 41054
- Class: B
- Power: 10,000 watts (day and critical hours); 500 watts (night)
- Transmitter coordinates: 30°16′51″N 92°00′53″W
- Translator: 98.5 K253CO (Lafayette)

Links
- Public license information: Public file; LMS
- Webcast: Listen live
- Website: newstalk985.com

KFXZ (1520 kHz) is a commercial AM radio station in Lafayette, Louisiana. It is owned by Delta Media and broadcasts a news/talk format. KFXZ's studios and offices are on Evangeline Thruway in Carencro. The transmitter is in Lafayette, northeast of the I-10/I-49 interchange.

By day, KFXZ is powered at 10,000 watts. But to protect Class A Clear-channel stations KOKC in Oklahoma City and WWKB in Buffalo from interference, KFXZ reduces its power to 500 watts at night and sends most of its signal southward while nulling it to the north, east, and west. The station is owned and operated by Charles Chatelain's Delta Media Corporation. Programming is also heard on FM translator 98.5 K253CO in Lafayette.

== History ==
In 1960, the station first signed on as KXKW. In March 1990, the call sign was changed to KINF, then to KACY in July 1990, followed by KDYS in September 1996, and in August 2004, the station was assigned its current callsign KFXZ.

After a year of running Radio AAHS, KDYS switched to the competing children's radio network, Radio Disney on December 1, 1997, following the announcement of Radio AAHS' end of service. As KDYS, the station aired the Radio Disney format until the fall of 2004.

On October 28, 2012, KFXZ changed the format from urban gospel to urban adult contemporary, branded as "Z 1520", picking up the format from KFXZ-FM 105.9, which flipped to country music.

On May 1, 2013, KFXZ changed its format to Spanish language adult hits, branded as "Juan AM 1520".

On November 1, 2015, KFXZ flipped to Regional Mexican music, branded as "El Sabor", simulcasting KSLO-FM.

On July 1, 2020, KFXZ dropped its simulcast and began stunting with Christmas music, in advance of a change of format. On July 17, 2020, KFXZ switched to talk radio, branded as "News Talk 98.5" (simulcast on FM translator K253CO 98.5 FM Lafayette). It also picked up a simulcast partner serving the Lake Charles area, KLCJ (104.1 FM). On February 7, 2022, KLCJ switched to simulcasting KLWB-FM.

== Programming ==
KFXZ mostly carries nationally syndicated shows. The station does have two local programs that air weekdays "Austins on the Air" and "The Ross Report".
