= KRDJ =

KRDJ may refer to:

- KRDJ-LD, a defunct low-power television station (channel 10) formerly licensed to serve Lubbock, Texas, United States; see List of television stations in Texas
- KYFJ, a radio station (93.7 FM) licensed to serve New Iberia, Louisiana, United States, which held the call sign KRDJ from 2005 to 2014
