= KXKC =

Coordinates: 30.202°N 91.777°W

- New Iberia, Louisiana; United States
- Broadcast area: Lafayette metropolitan area (secondary coverage of Baton Rouge, Louisiana)
- Frequency: 99.1 MHz
- Branding: 99.1 KXKC

Programming
- Format: Classic country
- Affiliations: Westwood One

Ownership
- Owner: Cumulus Media; (Radio License Holding CBC, LLC)
- Sister stations: KNEK-FM, KRRQ, KSMB

History
- First air date: January 1969
- Former call signs: KNIR-FM (1969–1972); KDEA (1972–1992)
- Call sign meaning: Variation of KXKW

Technical information
- Licensing authority: FCC
- Facility ID: 6350
- Class: C0
- ERP: 100,000 watts
- HAAT: 300 meters (980 ft)

Links
- Public license information: Public file; LMS
- Webcast: Listen live; Listen live (via iHeartRadio)
- Website: kxkc.com

KXKC (99.1 FM) is an American radio station licensed for New Iberia, Louisiana, in the Lafayette metropolitan area. It airs a classic country music format, and is under ownership of Cumulus Media. Its studios are located on Galbert Road in Lafayette, and its transmitter, shared with KHXT and KTDY, is located north of St. Martinville, Louisiana.

== History ==
Don Bonin first signed on the 99.1 frequency in January 1969 as the FM counterpart of KNIR with the calls KNIR-FM. KNIR-FM became KDEA on August 1, 1972, playing beautiful music-easy listening for the Lafayette and Baton Rouge radio markets. The format continued through the 1980s and into the early 1990s, when the popularity of the easy listening format began to decline nationwide and KDEA went into competition with KTDY with a mainstream adult contemporary format.

Logo as "99.1 KXKC"

On August 21, 1992, at 6 pm KDEA started playing the song "American Pie" by Don McLean on a continuous loop. Between each playing of the song, a voice could be heard saying, "A new day begins Monday." The song continued to play over and over until 6 am Monday, August 24, when a jingle played announcing that the station was now "Hot Country 99.1, KXKC". This was followed by "Friends in Low Places", by Garth Brooks.

The station had normal operations for only one day as Hurricane Andrew was approaching. On Tuesday, August 25 at 10 am, the station began continuous coverage of the approaching hurricane. The storm came ashore early Wednesday morning, knocking the station off the air for 20 hours when water shorted out the transmitter in Parks, Louisiana. Hurricane recovery information dominated the station for the next few days, but by the following Monday morning, August 31, 1992, KXKC was operating as normal.

In 2003, Don Bonin exited the radio business, selling KNIR to Radio Maria and KXKC to Citadel Broadcasting in exchange for KRXE (now KFXZ-FM) and KFXZ (now KYMK-FM), which he immediately sold to Pittman Broadcasting Services. Citadel merged with Cumulus Media on September 16, 2011.

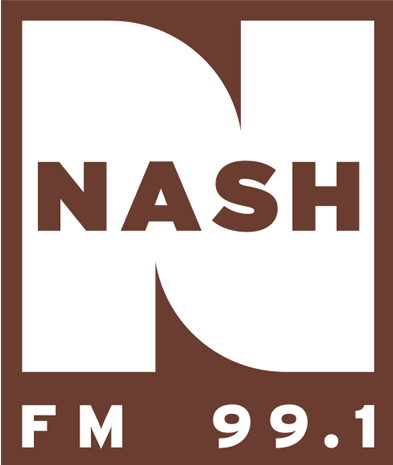
Logo as "Nash FM 99.1"

On September 4, 2020, KXKC dropped Nash FM and rebranded back to "99.1 KXKC". On September 2, 2022, KXKC shifted its format to 1990s-based classic country.
