= Louisiana Ragin' Cajuns =

University of Louisiana-Lafayette athletic teams

- University: University of Louisiana at Lafayette
- Nickname: Ragin' Cajuns
- NCAA: Division I (FBS)
- Conference: Sun Belt
- Athletic director: Bryan Maggard
- Location: Lafayette, Louisiana
- Varsity teams: 16
- Football stadium: Cajun Field
- Basketball arena: Cajundome; Earl K. Long Gymnasium
- Baseball stadium: M. L. Tigue Moore Field at Russo Park
- Softball stadium: Yvette Girouard Field at Lamson Park
- Soccer stadium: Home Bank Soccer/Track Facility
- Other venues: Cajun Courts; Oakbourne Country Club
- Colors: Vermilion and white
- Mascot: Cayenne
- Fight song: Ragin' Cajuns Fight Song
- Website: ragincajuns.com

The Louisiana Ragin' Cajuns are the athletic teams of the University of Louisiana at Lafayette. The college has been competing athletically since 1901. The Ragin' Cajuns compete in NCAA Division I, fielding 16 varsity teams.

== Nickname ==
The university states that "Louisiana Ragin' Cajuns" is the nickname of the school's athletic teams.

Founded in 1898 as Southwestern Louisiana Industrial Institute (SLII), the school adopted Bulldogs as a team nickname in 1921. The nickname persisted when the school was renamed Southwestern Louisiana Institute (SLI) in 1921 and the University of Southwestern Louisiana (USL) in 1960.

Sun Belt Conference logo in Louisiana's colors

The university's 1963 football team was unusually strong in homegrown talent; 35 of its 39 players were from Louisiana, with 30 from within 100 miles of Lafayette. As a result, coach Russ Faulkinberry changed the team's nickname to the Raging Cajuns, a nod to the ethnic group based in south Louisiana. (The team went 4–5.) The name change also ended a longstanding nickname overlap with the Louisiana Tech Bulldogs.

The term Raging (or Ragin') Cajuns had been used in a number of contexts before 1963, including as the nickname of the Louisiana-based U.S. Marine Corps Reserve Squadron VMF-143. The team changed the nickname from "Raging" to "Ragin'" in 1967 and formally adopted it for all athletic teams in 1974.

Briefly in 1984, USL's name became the University of Louisiana, but was reverted to University of Southwestern Louisiana via court challenge. In 1999, it became the University of Louisiana at Lafayette (UL Lafayette) and maintained the Ragin' Cajuns nickname.

== Facilities ==
The area where the majority of the school's athletic facilities are located is formally known as the "Edgar G. "Sonny" Mouton, Jr. Sports and Entertainment Plaza." It is located apart from the main campus, and is bounded by West Congress Street to the north, Bertrand Drive to the west, Reinhardt Drive and Souvenir Gate to the south, and the coulee feeding into Coulee Mine to the east. It is more informally known as the Athletic Complex. Located in this area are:

- Cajundome

The Cajundome is a 13,500-seat multi-purpose arena. It is home to the Louisiana Ragin' Cajuns Men's and Women's basketball programs in addition to hosting various university events and commencement ceremonies including high school graduations. It also hosts many regional concerts (seating for concerts 8,481 to 13,500) and special events

- Cajun Field

Nicknamed The Swamp, Cajun Field is the home field of Louisiana Ragin' Cajuns football team. Cajun Field has an official capacity of 41,426 with 2,577 chairback seats.

- Cajun Courts

The facility is the home of Ragin' Cajuns men's and women's tennis teams. The facility built in 1975 has a seating capacity of 1,200.

- Home Bank Soccer/Track Facility

The facility is the home of Ragin' Cajuns women's soccer and men's and women's track and field teams. The facility built in 1976 has a seating capacity of 5,000.

- M. L. Tigue Moore Field at Russo Park

More commonly known as "the Tigue," is the home stadium of the Louisiana Ragin' Cajuns baseball team. Built in 1979 it currently has a capacity of 6,033.

- Yvette Girouard Field at Lamson Park

The park is the home of the Louisiana Ragin' Cajuns softball program. Built in 1985 it currently has a capacity of 2,790.

- Donald and Janice Mosing Student-Athlete Performance Center

The SAPC is a 100,000-square foot facility that houses the Ragin' Cajuns football offices, strength and conditioning, athletic training and the equipment room. Opened in September 2015, is the largest in the Sun Belt Conference and is one of the largest among Division I schools across the South. It includes a 12,000-square foot weight room, the state-of-the-art athletic training room and hydrotherapy area, nutrition station and the 150-seat auditorium.

- Leon Moncla Indoor Practice Facility

Completed in August, 2007, at a cost of approximately $4.5 million, the facility houses a full 120-yard football field covered by a turf surface. It also contains a basketball practice facility which includes a full court with six goals, locker room, video room, players lounge and meeting room. The facility also contains drop-down batting cages which are utilized by the basketball, softball and golf teams. The baseball and softball teams also use the facility as needed.

Additionally, while just outside the sports complex, Bourgeois Hall (Health & PE) is located immediately next to Lamson Park. Also, Earl K. Long Gym (Women's basketball and volleyball) is located on the main campus

== Sports sponsored ==
| Men's sports | Women's sports |
|---|---|
| Baseball | Basketball |
| Basketball | Cross country |
| Cross country | Soccer |
| Football | Softball |
| Golf | Tennis |
| Tennis | Track and field^{†} |
| Track and field^{†} | Volleyball |
† – Track and field includes both indoor and outdoor.

=== Baseball ===
- First Year of Baseball: 1903
- First Year of Division I: 1972
- Years of Baseball: 101st season
- All-Time Division I Record (since 1972): 1,301–885–4 (.595)
- All-Time Sun Belt Record: 315–181 (.635)
- NCAA Appearances/Last: Fifteen/2016
- All-Time NCAA Tournament Record: 20–25
- Regular Season Conference Championships: 16
  - Gulf States Conference (1949, 1950, 1951, 1952, 1953)
  - Southland Conference (1972 and 1973)
  - American South Conference (1989, 1990, 1991)
  - Sun Belt Conference (1997, 2005, 2007, 2010, 2014, 2016)
- Conference Tournament championships: 7
  - American South Conference (1988, 1990, 1991)
  - Sun Belt Conference (1998, 2014, 2015, 2016)
- Last time in postseason: Lafayette Regional (2016)
- Finished tied for 3rd at 2000 College World Series after knocking off overall #1 South Carolina in Super Regional. Defeated Clemson and San Jose State, lost to Stanford twice.

=== Men's basketball ===
The Ragin' Cajuns men's basketball team came to prominence under the leadership of head coach Beryl Shipley, who was responsible for breaking the color barrier in the South and won just under 70% of all games from 1957 to 1973.

Notable players include NCAA 2nd All-time leading scorer Dwight "Bo" Lamar, Dean Church, Andrew Toney, Marv Winkler, Dwayne Mitchell, and Elfrid Payton.

In 1973, the university became one of only five schools to ever receive the NCAA's Death Penalty, when their basketball program was barred from competing in the NCAA for the 1973–74 and 1974–75 seasons.

The current head coach is Quannas White.

- 1964, 1966, 1967, 1968, and 1969 Gulf States Conference regular season champions
- 1977 and 1982 Southland Conference regular season champions
- 1992, 2000, and 2018 Sun Belt Conference regular season champions
- 2002, 2003, 2008, and 2011 Sun Belt Conference West division champions
- 1982 Southland Conference tournament champions
- 1992, 1994, 2000, 2014, 2023 Sun Belt Conference tournament champions
- 1982, 1983, 1992, 1994, 2000, 2014, 2023 NCAA Tournament appearances

=== Women's basketball ===
The Ragin' Cajuns women's basketball team plays their home games at the Cajundome. They are currently coached by Gary Brodhead.

- 2007 NCAA Tournament appearance
- 2015 and 2016 Women's Basketball Invitational National champions

=== Football ===
Football was the first team organized at the then institute (SLII) in 1901, although an advertisement promoting women's gymnastics was placed in 1900. The team participates in NCAA Division I FBS in the Sun Belt Conference. First played in 1901 under the school's previous name SLII. They are a charter member of NCAA Division I-A football.

Louisiana vacated 22 wins from 2011 to 2014 including the 2011 and 2013 New Orleans Bowls and also vacated the 2013 Sun Belt Conference co-championship as the result of NCAA violations of ACT exam fraud, payments to recruits, and not cooperating with the NCAA investigation.

On December 15, 2017, Billy Napier was named head football coach of the Louisiana Ragin' Cajuns. Napier led the Cajuns to a period of unprecedented success, including records of 11–3, 10–1, and 12–1 in consecutive seasons before he was hired away to be the head coach of Florida. His successor is Michael Desormeaux.

=== Softball ===
The Softball team is among the most successful of all Ragin' Cajun teams, having won 21 regular season championships, 16 conference tournament championships, and six appearances in the Women's College World Series (1993, 1995, 1996, 2003, 2008, and 2014). During the 2008 WCWS appearance the Ragin' Cajuns defeated #1 ranked Florida and eventually finished fifth. The Ragin' Cajun softball team has seen post-season play in 19 of the past 20 seasons. The Ragin' Cajuns have been Sun Belt Conference regular season champions in 2000, 2001, 2002, 2003, 2004, 2005, 2006, 2008, 2009, 2010, 2011, 2014, 2016, 2017, and 2019, Sun Belt tournament champions in 2000, 2001, 2002, 2003, 2004, 2005, 2006, 2008, 2009, 2010, 2011, 2014, 2016, 2017, and 2019 along with 27 NCAA Regionals, 33 NFCA All-Americans, and 37 consecutive winning seasons (only having one losing season, 1981, their first year of play in which they would finish 6–14).

The current head coach is Alyson Habetz. She replaced former head coach Gerry Glasco, who left for Texas Tech.

=== Men's tennis ===
1977, 1978, 1979, 1980, 1981, and 1982 Southland Conference Champions; 1992, 1998, 2006, and 2014 Sun Belt Conference Champions, highest national ranking #15 (1988).

The current head coach is Mark Jeffrey. They play their home matches at Cajun Courts, an off-campus tennis complex at the University of Louisiana at Lafayette near M. L. Tigue Moore Field at Russo Park, the Athletic Training facility, Yvette Girouard Field at Lamson Park and Cajun Field.

=== Women's Tennis ===
1986 and 1987 Southland Conference Champions and 1990 and 1991 American Southwest Conference Champions, highest national ranking was in 2006 at No. 51.

The current head coach is Stephanie Vallejos. They play their home matches at Cajun Courts, an off-campus tennis complex at the University of Louisiana at Lafayette near M. L. Tigue Moore Field at Russo Park, the Athletic Training facility, Yvette Girouard Field at Lamson Park and Cajun Field.

== Non–varsity sports ==
Men's Lacrosse as part of the MCLA, Badminton, Bowling, Cheerleading, Cricket, Ice Hockey as part of the ACHA, Inline Hockey as part of the NCRHA, Judo, Powerlifting, Rugby, Men's Soccer, Sport Shooting, Tae Kwon Do, Water Skiing.

- Water Skiing - First year of competition: 1989. Has finished no worse than third in the annual NCWSA National Collegiate Water Ski Association championships since 1993. National champions: 1995, 1997, 2003, 2005, 2010, 2015, 2019 and 2022

== Traditions ==
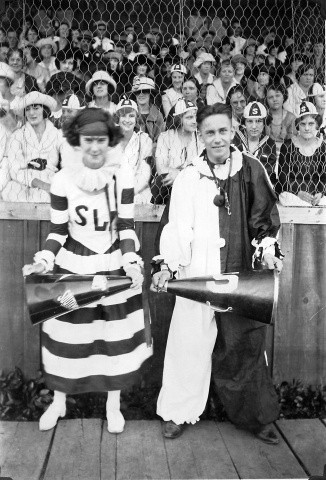
Lafayette Cheerleaders, 1922

=== Mascots ===
- Bulldog
- Mr. Cajun (animated)
- RC the Bulldog (live)
- "Gee" the bulldog (live) prior to being the Ragin' Cajuns
- "The Fabulous Cajun Chicken" (animated) 1982–1999
- Cayenne (animated) (2000–2010)

== Ragin Cajun Network ==
Louisiana launched the Ragin' Cajun Radio Network in August 2011. The Network is a series of radio and television networks that provide access to sporting events throughout the state of Louisiana. Two Lafayette radio stations, KPEL-AM and KHXT-FM, provide play by play radio commentary called by broadcasters Jay Walker, and Steve Peloquin. The full list of participating stations are:

- KPEL 1420 AM/KPEL 96.5 FM /KHXT 107.9 FM in Lafayette
- WGSO 990 AM in New Orleans
- KTUX 98.9 FM in Shreveport
- KLCL 1470 AM in Lake Charles

Television coverage is provided by Cox Communications as part of their Cox 4 and Cox Sports Television networks. Cox Sports Television now has over 2 million subscriptions in the states of Texas, Arkansas, Louisiana, Georgia, Florida, Mississippi, Oklahoma and Virginia. Additionally, all games aired by the channels will also be available online at ESPN3.com provided nationwide coverage to the Ragin' Cajuns.

== See also ==
- List of NCAA Division I institutions
