= CW 50 =

CW 50 may refer to one of the following television stations:

== Current ==
- WKBD-TV in Detroit, Michigan
- WDCW in Washington, D.C. (O&O)
- WWTI-DT2 in Watertown, New York (O&O)

== Former ==
- KLWB in Lafayette, Louisiana (2006–2010)
- WPWR-TV in Chicago, Illinois (2016–2019)
