= KFTE =

Radio station in Abbeville, Louisiana

- Abbeville, Louisiana; United States
- Broadcast area: Lafayette metropolitan area
- Frequency: 105.1 MHz
- Branding: Classic Rock 105.1

Programming
- Format: Classic rock

Ownership
- Owner: Townsquare Media (sale pending); (The Fort Collins/Lafayette Divestiture Trust)
- Sister stations: KHXT, KMDL, KPEL, KPEL-FM, KROF, KTDY

History
- First air date: May 25, 1974
- Former call signs: KROF-FM (1974–1980); KASC (1980–1986); KROF-FM (1986–1999); KPEL-FM (1999–2010)
- Former frequencies: 104.9 MHz
- Call sign meaning: Lafayette

Technical information
- Licensing authority: FCC
- Facility ID: 276
- Class: C3
- ERP: 25,000 watts
- HAAT: 89 meters (292 ft)
- Transmitter coordinates: 30.011°N 92.123°W

Links
- Public license information: Public file; LMS
- Webcast: Listen Live
- Website: classicrock1051.com

KFTE (105.1 FM, "Classic Rock 105.1") is a commercial radio station in Abbeville, Louisiana, broadcasting to the Lafayette, Louisiana, area. KFTE airs a classic rock music format, and is owned by Townsquare Media. Its studios are located on Bertrand Road in Lafayette, and its transmitter is located north of Abbeville, Louisiana.

== History ==
KFTE was established as KROF-FM 104.9, sister station to KROF (960 AM), on May 25, 1974. It initially simulcasted KROF during the day and continued its broadcasts at night. The call letters were changed to KASC on November 1, 1980. In 1994, Schilling Distributing Co., a beer distributor, bought the station from Mid-Acadiana Broadcasting. Previously, it was the last alternative rock station under Townsquare Media ownership since Townsquare Media is withdrawing alternative rock stations from ownership. For example, some Townsquare Media stations dumped the format entirely such as WGRD-FM in Grand Rapids, Michigan. In 2012, KFTE shifted to Mainstream Rock.

On January 19, 2017, KFTE changed their format to classic rock, branded as "Classic Rock 105.1".
