= KROF =

Radio station in Abbeville, Louisiana

- Abbeville, Louisiana; United States
- Broadcast area: Lafayette metropolitan area
- Frequency: 960 kHz
- Branding: Talk Radio 960am

Programming
- Format: Talk
- Affiliations: Fox News Radio; Westwood One; Premiere Networks

Ownership
- Owner: Townsquare Media; (Townsquare Media of Lafayette, LLC)
- Sister stations: KFTE, KHXT, KMDL, KPEL, KPEL-FM, KTDY

History
- First air date: July 9, 1948
- Call sign meaning: Rice, Oil, and Furs, the three main exports of Vermilion Parish

Technical information
- Licensing authority: FCC
- Facility ID: 275
- Class: D
- Power: 1,000 watts day 95 watts night
- Transmitter coordinates: 30°00′40″N 92°07′21″W

Links
- Public license information: Public file; LMS
- Webcast: Listen Live
- Website: talkradio960.com

KROF (960 kHz) is an American radio station broadcasting a talk format. Licensed to Abbeville, Louisiana, United States, the station serves the Lafayette area. The station is currently owned by Townsquare Media. Its studios are located on Bertrand Road in Lafayette, and its transmitter is located north of Abbeville.

== History ==
KROF made its official debut on July 9, 1948. It broadcast as a daytime-only station on 960 with 1,000 watts and was the first radio station in Abbeville. The station was owned by Abbeville Broadcasting Service, a local corporation in which residents of Vermilion Parish invested $50,000. The station affiliated with the short-lived Progressive Broadcasting System in 1950.

In October 1970, interests from Crowley began a bid to take over KROF. William C. Broadhurst, an attorney, sent letters to the shareholders in Abbeville Broadcasting Service, offering $400 per share. However, Broadhurst was only able to acquire 176 of the 187 shares necessary to gather a controlling interest in the licensee. Local groups, including the Abbeville city council, passed resolutions asking the Federal Communications Commission to disapprove of any sale of KROF to out-of-town parties, fearful that with the recent sale of the Abbeville Meridional newspaper to other Crowley-based investors, there would be no locally owned source of news and information in Vermilion Parish.

Abbeville Broadcasting Service filed to build an FM counterpart for KROF in 1973. KROF-FM debuted May 25, 1974, allowing Abbeville Broadcasting Service to broadcast after dark; during the day, it simulcast its AM counterpart. The AM and FM sides began to air more separate programming as the 1970s went on, with 960 AM continuing in its Top 40 format while 104.9 FM became a country outlet, changing its call letters on November 1, 1980, to KASC, for "Acadiana/Stereo Country".

In 1984, KROF became known as "Boss 96". Two years later, however, 104.9 became KROF-FM and the two stations resumed a simulcast of what had been the FM's country format. When KROF-FM moved to 105.1 MHz in 1991 as part of a power increase, the two stations flipped to oldies.

The AM and FM frequencies split again in 1993, but this time, it was the AM's turn to make the change. On March 1, KROF AM began broadcasting entirely in French, including Cajun music and commercials. It was the only all-French station in Louisiana. The effort ended after seven months on September 30, when the station resumed simulcasting the FM due to lack of support for the French-language format. In January 1994, KROF AM rolled out a new "Cajun Country Gold" format. Local Vermilion Parish sports broadcasts remained on AM until they moved to the FM frequency in 1996.

Larger changes came in 1999 when a majority stake in KROF-AM-FM was sold to Galloway Consulting Services, owners of multiple stations in the Lafayette market, for $787,500. Galloway, which became known as ComCorp of Lafayette, sold the entire cluster to Regent Communications—predecessor to Townsquare Media—in 2001 for $39.6 million, marking its exit from radio while continuing to own television stations.
