= Cayenne (mascot) =

Mascot of the University of Louisiana at Lafayette

- University: University of Louisiana at Lafayette
- Conference: Sun Belt
- Description: Anthropomorphic Cayenne pepper
- First seen: 2000
- Last seen: Current

Cayenne was a "spirit leader" of the Louisiana Ragin' Cajuns. He was an anthropomorphic Cayenne pepper (a staple spice of the Acadiana region in which the school is located).

Louisiana does not have an official mascot. In recent years the university has had several mascots including live bulldogs (when the athletic teams were named the Bulldogs), Mr. Ragin' Cajun (animated), and the Fabulous Cajun Chicken (the most popular mascot in the history of the school). Cayenne was created using an "out of the box" method. Instead of being a physical representation of Ragin' Cajuns, like most mascots are, Cayenne was the embodiment of the Ragin' Cajun spirit of Acadiana.

Cayenne was introduced in 2000, and changes clothes depending on what sporting event he's at, e.g., he wears a Ragin' Cajun football uniform at the football games, and a Louisiana basketball jersey for the basketball games.

== Disappearance and replacement ==
Around 2010, Cayenne went into apparent exile due to budget issues. In 2017, Louisiana Director of Athletics Bryan Maggard announced that a new mascot would be unveiled within two years. In 2019, a secret committee was discovered to be working on creating a new mascot. As of 2020, the Ragin' Cajuns are still without a mascot. For Halloween 2020, the Athletic site’s social media posted a picture of a graveyard with the words “Cayenne” and “The Fabulous Cajun Chicken” (the former Cajuns’ mascot) on two graves, suggesting that Cayenne’s mascot is “dead” and not making a return.
