= KLWB-FM =

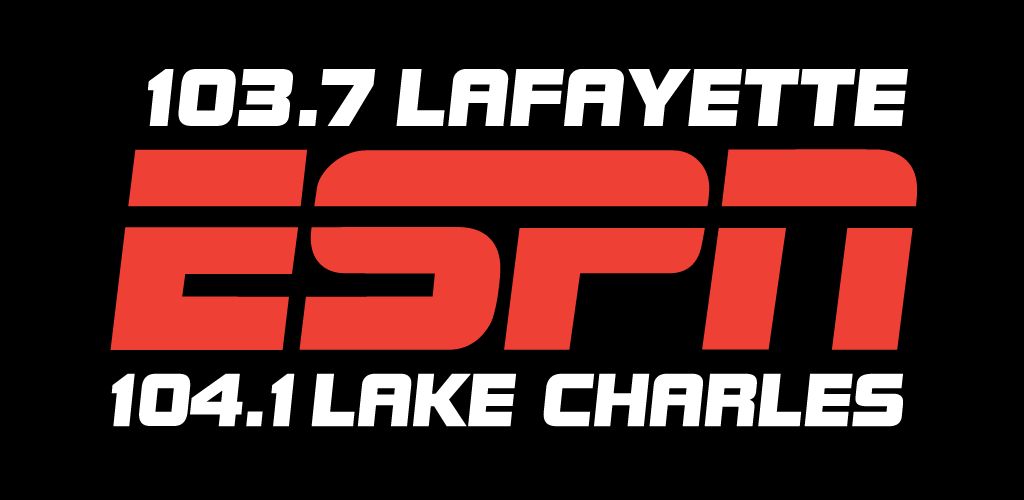
- Carencro, Louisiana; United States
- Broadcast area: Lafayette metropolitan area
- Frequency: 103.7 MHz
- Branding: ESPN 103.7 Lafayette and 104.1 Lake Charles

Programming
- Format: Sports radio
- Affiliations: ESPN Radio; LSU Sports Radio Network; Houston Astros Radio Network; NFL on Westwood One

Ownership
- Owner: Delta Media Corporation
- Sister stations: KLWB; KXKW-LP; KXKW-LD; KSLO; KSLO-FM; KFXZ-FM; KFXZ; KYMK-FM; KDCG-CD; KVOL

History
- First air date: May 27, 2010; 15 years ago
- Call sign meaning: Station is co-owned with television station KLWB and shares its calls

Technical information
- Licensing authority: FCC
- Facility ID: 183335
- Class: C2
- ERP: 10,000 watts
- HAAT: 284 meters (932 ft)
- Transmitter coordinates: 30°20′32.00″N 91°57′46.00″W
- Repeater: 104.1 KLCJ (Oak Grove)

Links
- Public license information: Public file; LMS
- Webcast: Listen live
- Website: espnsouthwestlouisiana.com

KLWB-FM (103.7 MHz) is a commercial radio station broadcasting a sports format. Licensed to Carencro, Louisiana, it serves the Lafayette metropolitan area. KLWB-FM programming is also heard in the Lake Charles region of Louisiana, with a simulcast on KLCJ 104.1 FM. The two stations carry ESPN Radio's morning programming as well as Matt Moscona's After Further Review.

KLWB-FM is owned by the Delta Media Corporation and calls itself "Southwest Louisiana's Sports Station." KLWB-FM's studios are on Evangeline Thruway in Carencro, and its transmitter is located northeast of Lafayette.

== History ==
KLWB-FM signed on in May 2010, with its official launch coming on May 27. The station's format originated as classic hits on sister station KXKW. That station - Mustang 87.7 - now airs a classic country format.

Former logo

On June 1, 2012, KLWB-FM changed its format from classic rock (as "Snap 103.7) to sports radio, branded as "103.7 The Game".

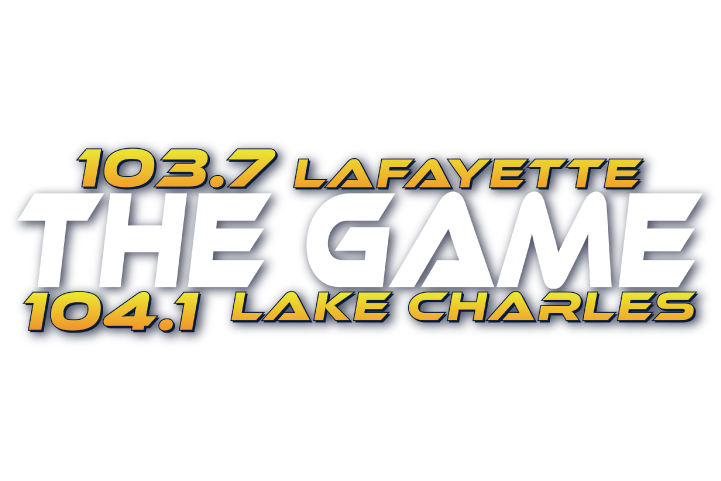
Previous logo

On February 7, 2022, KLWB-FM began simulcasting on KLCJ 104.1 FM in Oak Grove. The KLCJ simulcast brings KLWB-FM's sports programming into the Lake Charles radio market.

On June 26, 2023, KLWB-FM and KLCJ became ESPN Radio Affiliates and also picked up Matt Moscona's After Further Review for their afternoon drive programming
