= KHXT =

Radio station in Erath–Lafayette, Louisiana

Coordinates: 30.202°N 91.777°W

- Erath, Louisiana; United States
- Broadcast area: Lafayette metro; Baton Rouge metro
- Frequency: 107.9 MHz
- Branding: Hot 107.9

Programming
- Format: Rhythmic contemporary
- Affiliations: Compass Media Networks; Louisiana Ragin' Cajuns football

Ownership
- Owner: Townsquare Media; (Townsquare Media of Lafayette, LLC)
- Sister stations: KFTE, KMDL, KPEL, KPEL-FM, KROF, KTDY

History
- First air date: 1992
- Former call signs: KRAR (1989–1990, CP); KXKW (1990–1992, CP); KPEL-FM (1992–1998); KRXZ (1998–2000); KRKA (2000–2010)
- Former frequencies: 107.7 MHz (1992–1997)
- Call sign meaning: "Hot"

Technical information
- Licensing authority: FCC
- Facility ID: 54650
- Class: C1
- ERP: 97,000 watts
- HAAT: 263 meters (863 ft)

Links
- Public license information: Public file; LMS
- Webcast: Listen live
- Website: 1079ishot.com

KHXT (107.9 FM, "HOT 107.9") is a rhythmic top 40 radio station serving the Lafayette area, as well as parts of Baton Rouge. The Townsquare Media outlet broadcasts with an ERP of 97 kW and is licensed to Erath, Louisiana. Its studios are located on Bertrand Road in Lafayette, and its transmitter, shared with KTDY and KXKC, is located north of St. Martinville, Louisiana. Every weekday from 6 AM to 10 AM, they host DJ Digital in the Morning Show with RV and Caroline, and Friday mornings from 6 AM to 10 AM, they host the Breakfast Jam, an all-request mix show mixed by DJ Digital, featuring throwbacks and party music, specifically from the 90s-2010s. The station also hosts Louisiana Ragin' Cajuns football games.

== History ==
The station originally debuted with a news/talk format at 107.7 as KPEL-FM in 1992, but by 1997 they switched frequencies to 107.9 and format to classic rock as KRXZ. In 2000 it changed the calls to KRKA and on November 11, 2003 they switched to Rhythmic Top-40. In 2010, it changed the calls to KHXT.

== DJs ==
- DJ Digital, morning show host and Brand Manager, is also the host of XXL Higher Level Radio.
- This station also carries Sunday Night Slow Jams with R Dub (Sundays 8pm-Midnight) and The Loud Mix with DJ Grooves (Saturdays 10pm-2am).
- Chris Reed, now Brand Manager of KTDY, co-hosted the Morning Buzz with DJ Digital until his promotion in 2023.
