= KRRQ =

Urban contemporary radio station in Lafayette, Louisiana

Coordinates: 30.352°N 92.181°W

Lafayette, Louisiana; United States
- Broadcast area: Lafayette metropolitan area
- Frequency: 95.5 MHz
- Branding: Q-95.5

Programming
- Format: Urban contemporary
- Affiliations: Premiere Networks

Ownership
- Owner: Cumulus Media; (Radio License Holding CBC, LLC)
- Sister stations: KXKC, KNEK-FM, KSMB

History
- First air date: July 15, 1996; 29 years ago

Technical information
- Licensing authority: FCC
- Facility ID: 36227
- Class: C2
- ERP: 50,000 watts
- HAAT: 135 meters (443 ft)

Links
- Public license information: Public file; LMS
- Webcast: Listen live
- Website: krrq.com

KRRQ (95.5 FM, "Q-95.5") is an American radio station serving the Lafayette metropolitan area with an urban contemporary format. It is under ownership of Cumulus Media. Its studios are located on Galbert Road in Lafayette, and its transmitter is located southeast of Church Point, Louisiana.

KRRQ first signed on March 1, 1996, with a contemporary hip hop and R&B format, owned by Citywide Communications. Citywide was later bought by Citadel Broadcasting, which merged with Cumulus Media in 2011. They are very well known for their 48-hour live Christmas special, donated to Africa.
