= KNEK-FM =

Coordinates: 30.422°N 92.114°W

- Washington, Louisiana; United States
- Broadcast area: Lafayette metropolitan area
- Frequency: 104.7 MHz
- Branding: Magic 104.7 KNEK

Programming
- Format: Urban adult contemporary
- Affiliations: Premiere Networks

Ownership
- Owner: Cumulus Media; (Radio License Holding CBC, LLC)
- Sister stations: KSMB, KRRQ, KXKC

History
- First air date: 1989

Technical information
- Licensing authority: FCC
- Facility ID: 16370
- Class: C3
- ERP: 25,000 watts
- HAAT: 100 meters (330 ft)

Links
- Public license information: Public file; LMS
- Webcast: Listen live
- Website: knek.com

KNEK-FM (104.7 MHz, "Magic 104.7 KNEK") is an American radio station playing an urban adult contemporary format in the Lafayette metropolitan area. It broadcasts under ownership of Cumulus Media. Its studios are located on Galbert Road in Lafayette, Louisiana, and its transmitter is located south of Opelousas, Louisiana.

Former logo

The station used to be owned by Citadel Broadcasting. In 2007, Citadel transferred 11 of its radio stations (including KNEK-FM) to The Last Bastion Station Trust, LLC upon merger of many ABC Radio stations. However, in January 2008, Last Bastion Station Trust transferred KNEK-FM back to Citadel Broadcasting, effectively placing it back into the Lafayette cluster. In exchange for KNEK-FM, the trust received KRDJ. Citadel merged with Cumulus Media on September 16, 2011.

KNEK-FM simulcasted their programing on AM 1190 KNEK until it left the air in May 2023 due to transmitter issues. Cumulus Media would surrender the KNEK AM license to the Federal Communications Commission (FCC) in March 2024.
