= KFXZ-FM =

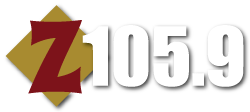
- Opelousas, Louisiana; United States
- Broadcast area: Lafayette, Louisiana
- Branding: Z 105.9

Programming
- Format: Urban adult contemporary
- Affiliations: Compass Media Networks; Premiere Networks

Ownership
- Owner: Charles Chatelain; (Delta Media Corporation)
- Sister stations: KVOL, KFXZ, KYMK-FM KLWB-FM, KOGM, KXKW-LD, KLWB KDCG-CD, KXKW-LP, KSLO-FM, KSLO

History
- First air date: 1988; 38 years ago
- Former call signs: KFND (1988–1989); KVOL-FM (1989–2002); KRXE (2002–2004); KTSJ (2004–2007)

Technical information
- Licensing authority: FCC
- Facility ID: 9416
- Class: A
- ERP: 3,400 watts
- HAAT: 132 meters (433 ft)

Links
- Public license information: Public file; LMS
- Webcast: Listen Live
- Website: z1059.com

KFXZ-FM (105.9 MHz, "Z 105.9") is an American radio station licensed to Opelousas, Louisiana. The station is owned by Charles Chatelain, through licensee Delta Media Corporation. It airs an urban adult contemporary format. KFXZ's studios are located on Evangeline Thruway in Carencro, and its transmitter is located south of Opelousas.

The station was assigned the KFXZ-FM call letters by the Federal Communications Commission on March 4, 2007.

== History ==
The station started out as an Alternative Rock station, but was later replaced as an easy listening jazz station. The station had been broadcasting a classic country format until November 4, 2008, when the format was changed to Urban AC. The new format featured the syndicated Tom Joyner Morning Show.

On October 28, 2012, KFXZ-FM changed their format from urban AC to country, branded as "Cat Country 105.9".

On May 1, 2013, KFXZ-FM changed their format back to urban AC, branded as "Z 105.9". The station also broadcast over the air on KLWB DT4.
