= KSLO (AM) =

Radio station in Opelousas, Louisiana

- Opelousas, Louisiana; United States
- Broadcast area: Lafayette metropolitan area
- Frequency: 1230 (kHz)
- Branding: Catholic Radio for Acadiana

Programming
- Format: Catholic Radio
- Affiliations: EWTN

Ownership
- Owner: Delta Media Corporation
- Sister stations: KSLO-FM, KLWB-FM, KLWB-FM, KOGM, KYMK, KFXZ, KFXZ-FM, KVOL, KXKW-LP, KXKW-LD

History
- First air date: September 21, 1947; 78 years ago
- Call sign meaning: OpeLouSas

Technical information
- Licensing authority: FCC
- Facility ID: 35607
- Class: C
- Power: 1,000 watts
- Transmitter coordinates: 30.52519°N 92.10630°W
- Translators: K258DQ (99.5 MHz, Lafayette)

Links
- Public license information: Public file; LMS
- Webcast: Listen Live
- Website: http://catholicradioforacadiana.com/

KSLO (1230 kHz) is a Catholic AM radio station licensed to Opelousas, Louisiana, and serving the Lafayette metropolitan area. KSLO simulcasts the programming of KLFT 90.5 in Kaplan, Louisiana. KSLO is owned by Delta Media Corporation. KSLO's studios are located on Evangeline Thruway in Carencro, and its transmitter is located in Opelousas.

== History ==
KSLO was Opelousas' first radio station, beginning broadcasting September 21, 1947, on 1230 kHz with a power of 250 watts. The station was owned and operated by Hugh O. Jones and W. Eugene Jones. It was affiliated with the Mutual network and used the United Press news service and World Broadcasting System transcriptions.

== Simulcast ==
KSLO simulcasts the programming of 90.5 KLFT in Kaplan, Louisiana.

Call sign	Frequency	City of license	FID	ERP (W)	HAAT	Class	FCC info
KLFT	90.5 FM	Kaplan, Louisiana	172397	17,000	149.9 m (492 ft)	C2	LMS
