= KSLO-FM =

Radio station in Simmesport, Louisiana

- Simmesport, Louisiana; United States
- Broadcast area: Opelousas–Lafayette–Alexandria–Baton Rouge areas
- Frequency: 105.3 MHz
- Branding: KSLO 105.3

Programming
- Format: Zydeco
- Affiliations: Westwood One

Ownership
- Owner: Delta Media Corporation
- Sister stations: KSLO; KXKW-LP/KXKW-LD; KLWB; KLWB-FM; KVOL; KYMK-FM; KFXZ-FM; KFXZ; KOGM

History
- First air date: March 2008 (as KXKW)
- Former call signs: KCJN (2007–2008); KXKW (2008–2011)

Technical information
- Facility ID: 164163
- Class: A
- ERP: 3,000 watts
- HAAT: 142.6 meters (468 ft)
- Transmitter coordinates: 30°54′08.0″N 91°56′07.7″W

Links
- Webcast: Listen Live
- Website: kslo1053.com

KSLO-FM (105.3 MHz) is a zydeco radio station licensed to Simmesport, Louisiana, serving the fringe area between the Lafayette, Alexandria, and Baton Rouge, Louisiana radio markets. KSLO-FM is owned by Delta Media Corporation along with KLWB, KLWB-FM, KXKW-LD, and KXKW-LP.

KXKW's old logo

KSLO-FM's studios are located on Evangeline Thruway in Carencro, and its transmitter is located in Avoyelles Parish, Louisiana (south of Plaucheville). KSLO-FM's audio feed was simulcast on KBCA's fourth subchannel in Alexandria until late 2019.

On March 7, 2022, KSLO-FM changed its format from Regional Mexican to soft oldies, branded as "105.3 MeTV FM".

On July 13, 2023, KSLO-FM changed its format from soft oldies to zydeco music, branded as "KSLO 105.3".
