= KPEL-FM =

Radio station in Breaux Bridge–Lafayette, Louisiana

- Breaux Bridge, Louisiana; United States
- Broadcast area: Lafayette metropolitan area
- Frequency: 96.5 MHz

Programming
- Format: News-Talk
- Network: Fox News Radio
- Affiliations: Louisiana Ragin' Cajuns; Premiere Networks; Westwood One; Compass Media Networks; KATC-TV Weather

Ownership
- Owner: Townsquare Media; (Townsquare Media of Lafayette, LLC)
- Sister stations: KFTE, KHXT, KMDL, KPEL, KROF, KTDY

History
- First air date: May 1, 1993; 33 years ago (as KFTE)
- Former call signs: KFTE (1992–2010)
- Call sign meaning: PELican State

Technical information
- Licensing authority: FCC
- Facility ID: 59288
- Class: C2
- ERP: 42,000 watts
- HAAT: 163 meters (535 ft)

Links
- Public license information: Public file; LMS
- Webcast: Listen Live
- Website: kpel965.com

KPEL-FM (96.5 FM) is a radio station in the United States. Licensed to Breaux Bridge, Louisiana, KPEL-FM serves the Lafayette metropolitan area with a news/talk format. It is owned by Townsquare Media.

Initially signing on with call sign KFTE in 1993, KPEL-FM was a music station for its first 17 years. After having easy listening and oldies formats, KFTE had an alternative rock format branded "Planet Radio 96.5" until changing to KPEL-FM and news/talk in 2010. Since 2001, KPEL-FM has been owned by Townsquare Media and its predecessor Regent Communications.

== History ==
=== As KFTE (1991–2010) ===
A construction permit was first issued for a new 96.5 MHz FM station on April 19, 1991. JBC Inc. (doing business as ComCorp of Lafayette License Corporation) was the owner. Licensed on November 15, 1992, the station first signed on with call sign KFTE on May 1, 1993. Its format was easy listening.

In July 1993, the Mid-Acadiana Broadcasting Corporation purchased KFTE, pairing it with KMDL. The price tag was $517,750 plus debt cancellation from ComCorp. At 6:00AM on Labor Day (September 5th) 1994, KFTE flipped to a unique mix of 70s and 80s pop and rock, using the brand "Cool 96."

Beer wholesale company Schilling Distributing Company purchased KFTE and KMDL for a combined $1.55 million in 1994. In 1996, Schilling took the station's broad format and focused it on 1970s oldies.

In 1996, ComCorp bought back KFTE, along with KMDL, from Schilling Distributing. The total price was nearly $4.5 million. On January 22, 1997, ComCorp flipped KFTE's format to alternative rock, with the brand "Planet Radio 96.5".

On August 29, 2001, Regent Communications (later Townsquare Media) reached an agreement to buy KFTE and six other radio stations from ComCorp. The price was over $39 million.

=== As KPEL-FM (2010–present) ===
When Regent Communications was reorganized as Townsquare Media in 2010, the group lost its grandfathered status of owning five FM stations in the market, where four is the current legal limit. With the weakest signal in the cluster, 105.1 in Abbeville (then KPEL-FM) was chosen to be spun off to a trust to be sold later. Despite the relatively weak signal, KPEL-FM was a strong performer in the cluster financially, so Townsquare wanted to keep it in the fold. Planet Radio's position in the cluster and market, on the other hand, had weakened significantly since its peak in the early 2000s.

On June 25, 2010, KFTE switched call signs and formats with KPEL-FM at 105.1 MHz. KFTE's rock format moved to 105.1, while KPEL-FM's news/talk format moved to 96.5 MHz.

In June 2020, early afternoon host Carol Ross decided to end her program and leave the station. On March 15, 2025, KPEL-FM began carrying Erick Erickson on weekdays from WSB Atlanta.

== Programming ==
KPEL-FM has local news and talk shows during the daytime, in addition to national news updates from Fox News Radio and nationally syndicated programs including The Erick Erickson Show, The Mark Levin Show, and The Ramsey Show.

Weekends feature specialty lifestyle shows, such as The Kim Komando Show and The Car Doctor, and paid programming. KPEL-FM also broadcasts Louisiana Ragin' Cajuns men's basketball and baseball games.

== Technical information ==
Licensed to Breaux Bridge, KPEL-FM broadcasts from a 167.6-meter transmitter located in Youngsville at 42 kW of effective radiated power.
