= KPEL (AM) =

Radio station in Lafayette, Louisiana

Lafayette, Louisiana; United States
- Frequency: 1420 kHz
- Branding: 103.3 The Goat

Programming
- Format: Sports
- Affiliations: Fox Sports Radio; Louisiana Ragin' Cajuns women's basketball Louisiana Ragin' Cajuns softball

Ownership
- Owner: Townsquare Media; (Townsquare Media of Lafayette, LLC)
- Sister stations: KFTE, KHXT, KMDL, KPEL-FM, KROF, KTDY

History
- First air date: November 1951
- Former call signs: KLFY (1949–1957)
- Call sign meaning: Pelican Broadcasting (former owner)

Technical information
- Licensing authority: FCC
- Facility ID: 12682
- Class: B
- Power: 1,000 watts (day); 750 watts (night)
- Transmitter coordinates: 30°16′38″N 92°3′51″W
- Translator: 103.3 K277DQ (Lafayette)

Links
- Public license information: Public file; LMS
- Webcast: Listen live
- Website: 1033thegoat.com

KPEL (1420 kHz, "103.3 The Goat") is an AM radio station licensed to serve Lafayette, Louisiana. The station is owned by Townsquare Media and licensed to Townsquare Media of Lafayette, LLC. It airs a sports radio format featuring programming from Fox Sports Radio. Its studios are located on Bertrand Road in Lafayette, and its transmitter is located about two miles north of the studios.

The station was founded in 1949 as KLFY-AM by Camellia Broadcasting and first went on air in November of 1951. Due to ownership change of its sister TV station KLFY-TV and Federal Communications Commission regulations in force at the time, KLFY-FM was assigned the new call letters KPEL by the FCC on July 1, 1957.

The station is the base of the Great S.C.O.T.T. Show with Scott Prather. The station serves as the flagship station of Louisiana Ragin' Cajun Athletics, airing UL football, men's and women's basketball, baseball, and softball games.

On September 30, 2022, KPEL rebranded as "103.3 The Goat".
