= Carencro, Louisiana =

Carencro, Louisiana de Carencro
- City
- City of Carencro
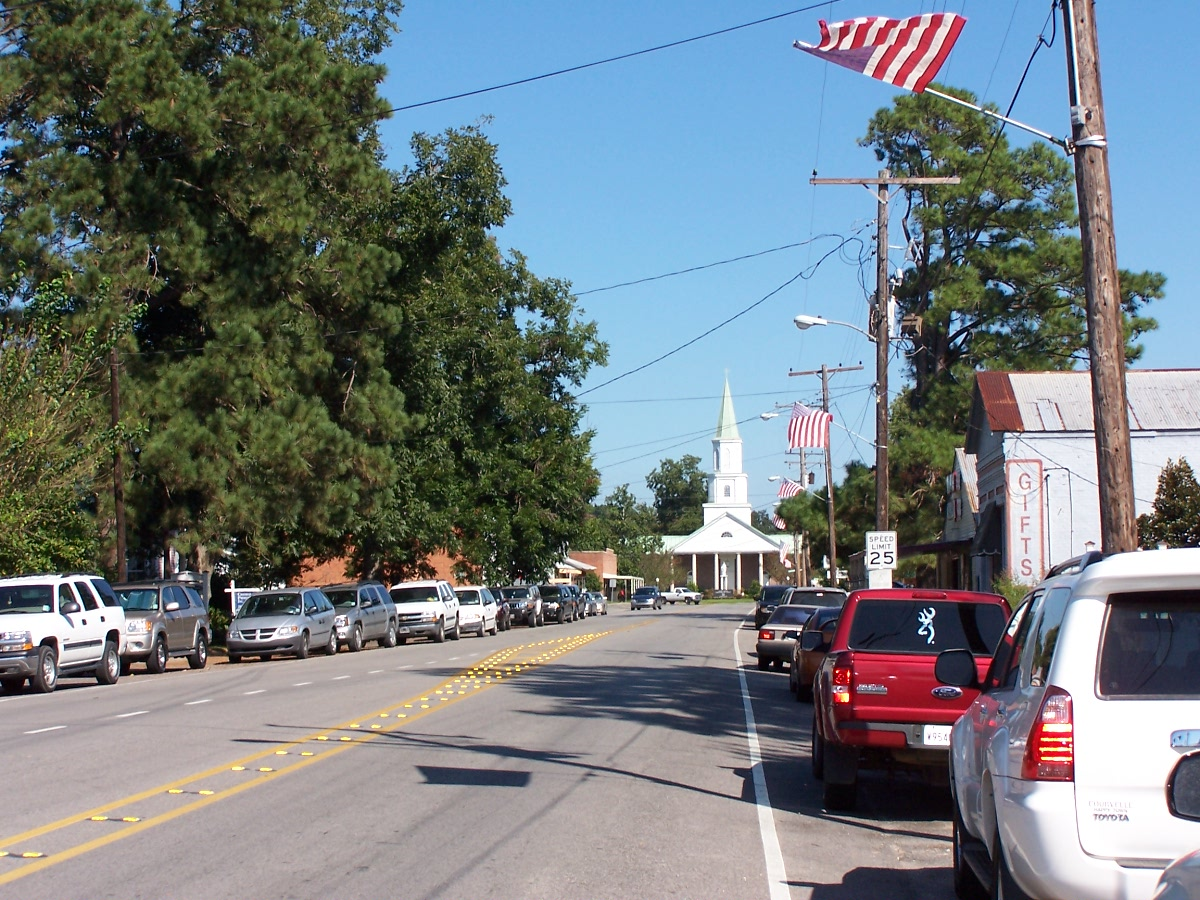
- Downtown Carencro

- Location of Carencro in Lafayette Parish, Louisiana.

- Location of Louisiana in the United States
- Coordinates: 30°18′51″N 92°02′37″W
- Country: United States
- State: Louisiana
- Parish: Lafayette

Government
  - Mayor: Charlotte Clavier (I)

Area
  - Total: 7.86 sq mi (20.35 km^{2})
  - Land: 7.86 sq mi (20.35 km^{2})
  - Water: 0 sq mi (0.00 km^{2})
- Elevation: 39 ft (12 m)

Population (2020)
  - Total: 9,272
  - Density: 1,180.2/sq mi (455.69/km^{2})
- Time zone: UTC-6 (CST)
  - Summer (DST): UTC-5 (CDT)
- ZIP code: 70520
- Area code: 337
- FIPS code: 22-12665
- Website: Carenco, Louisiana

Carencro (/ˈkærənkroʊ/; historically French: Saint-Pierre) is a city in Lafayette Parish, Louisiana, United States. It is a suburb of the nearby city of Lafayette. The population was 7,526 at the 2010 census, up from 6,120 in 2000; at the 2020 census, its population was 9,272. The name of the city is derived from the Cajun French word for buzzard; the spot where the community was settled was one where large flocks of American black vultures roosted in the bald cypress trees. The name means "carrion crow." Carencro is part of the Lafayette metropolitan area.

== Etymology ==
Many senior Carencro natives attest that the town's name originates from before the American Civil War. According to this local legend, Native Americans told Vermilionville settlers that in old times a large number of "carrion crows" (vultures, called carencro in French) had settled around the Vermilion River between Lafayette and Opelousas, Louisiana to feast on a fish die-off.

There is a related theory, consistent with the spelling, that the place is named for the carencro tête rouge, a red-headed buzzard referred to by European explorers as early as 1699, and described in 1774 by Antoine-Simon Le Page du Pratz. Du Pratz described the bird as having black plumage and a head covered with red flesh. He said the Spanish government protected the birds, "for as they do not use the whole carcass of the buffaloes which (the Spaniards) kill, those birds eat what they leave, which otherwise, by rotting on the ground, would ... infect the air."

In a letter written on April 23, 1802, Martin Duralde, a former commandant of the Opelousas post, related the legend as it had come down from an Attakapas Indian. Duralde wrote:

"Many years before the discovery of the elephant in the bayou called Carancro [sic] an Attakapas savage had informed a man who is at present in my service in the capacity of cow-herd that the ancestors of his nation transmitted (the story) to their descendants that a beast of enormous size had perished either in this bayou or in one of the two water courses a short distance from it without their being able to indicate the true place, the antiquity of the event having without doubt made them forget it."

(Note: The mastodon became extinct 4500–10,000 years ago)

A late 19th-century account stated the legend came from buzzards (vultures) feasting on a mastodon carcass. Its fossilized bones were reportedly discovered and collected by a French naturalist in the 18th century and shipped to the Jardin des Plantes of Paris, but the ship was wrecked on the way, and the bones were lost at sea. The only relic of the mastodon was a femur or leg bone, which was kept by an early settler, the first Guilbeau. He used it as a pestle to bruise indigo for processing, a crop then cultivated in the Attakapas Indian country. The Indians termed the birds carecros; and from the spot where the mastodon died, the river takes the name of Bayou Carencro.

First called St. Pierre, in the late 19th century, the town was renamed Carencro, after the "carrion crow" (vulture) legend. Although Carencro's current town center lies well west of the Vermilion River, this legend has permanence within the community.

Some people think that the name comes from the Spanish carnero, meaning "bone pile". This idea also comes from the mastodon legend, and the idea that the buzzards left nothing but a pile of white bones after they had picked the mastodon clean.

== History ==
=== Early settlement ===
Few European people settled in the Carencro area (around Lafayette) until the coming of the Acadian refugees in the 18th century. Some of the Acadians transported in 1765 to the Attakapas district were given lands along Bayou Carencro, although probably not in what is now the town of Carencro. At that time, Jean and Marin Mouton, Charles Peck, Louis Pierre Arceneaux and others began to establish vacheries in the vicinity. More cattlemen would follow after 1770, when Spanish Gov. Alejandro O'Reilly decreed that "a grant of 42 arpents [35 acres] in front by 42 in depth could be issued only to those who owned 100 head of tame cattle, some sheep and horses, and two slaves to oversee them."

In 1769, Juan Kelly and Eduardo Nugent toured the area for the government and reported to O'Reilly that "the inhabitants maintain everything imaginable in the way of livestock, such as cows, horses and sheep." A Frenchman named Lyonnet, visiting in 1793, found thousands of cattle on the Attakapas and Opelousas prairies.

Jean and Marin Mouton were among the early settlers on Bayou Carencro. Other early settlers in the Carencro area were Charles Peck, Traveille Bernard, Rosamond Breaux, Ovignar Arceneaux, and the Babineaux family. An 1803 census of the Carencro area listed family names including Arceneaux, Babineaux, Benoit, Bernard, Breaux, Carmouche, Caruthers, Comeaux, Cormier, Guilbeaux, Hébert, Holway, LeBlanc, Melançon, Mire, Mouton, Pierre, Prejean, Roger, St. Julien, Savoie, and Thibodeaux.

=== First post office ===
The first post office in Carencro was established on January 11, 1872, with Auguste Melchior as postmaster. The telegraph line reached there in 1884. The first telephones were installed by the Teche and Vermilion Telephone Line in 1894. The company was headquartered in New Iberia.

=== Historic churches ===
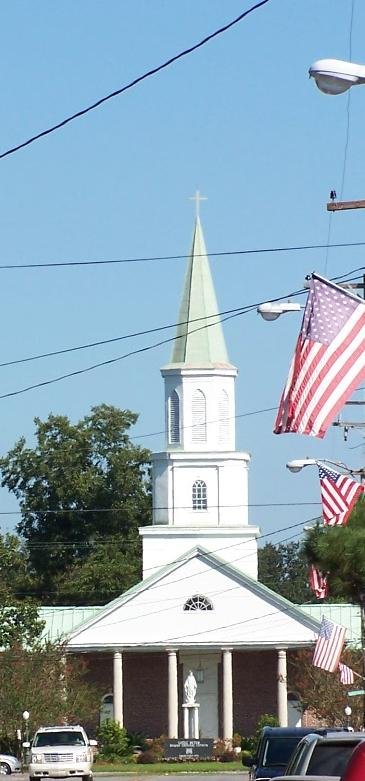
Downtown facing St. Peter's church.

According to Roger Baudier's history of the Catholic Church of Louisiana, the Carencro area was first served from Grand Coteau, Louisiana, later from Vermilionville, and then from Breaux Bridge, Louisiana.

The parish of St. Peter was established in 1874 and the archdiocese sent Father Andre Marie Guillot as its first pastor. Before a church was built at Carencro, services were held in the Carmouche blacksmith shop. The church was initially called St. Pierre au Carencro, named for Pierre Cormier, who donated land for the first church. Father Guillot died of yellow fever while serving in Carencro. He was buried in the church cemetery.

According to Baudier, "(Father Guillot's) successor was Father J.F Suriray. Trouble with the parishioners arose and Father Suriray was threatened by the people. Some three years after his coming to Carencro, he was obliged to leave. Some time after, the church was destroyed by fire and the parish remained without a pastor until 1883."

A plaque outside the later church notes the land was donated by the Jean Jacques Coussan family. A new church was built in 1893, but was destroyed by a tornado before it was ever used. Another church was built, and it burned in 1904. The current church was built in 1906 under the administration of Father F.J. Grimeaux, who served the parish for some 25 years. In addition, he organized the Carencro Brass Band and played clarinet with it.

A young carpenter named Hector Connolly worked for $2.50 a day to build the 110-foot steeple.

The Church of the Assumption was built in 1925 to serve a Black congregation. The Holy Ghost Fathers accepted an invitation to direct the parish and sent Father Joseph Dolan as the first pastor. Assumption Church continues to operate today with its original structure. This is the only white, wood-frame structure of its kind in the Diocese of Lafayette.

Our Lady of the Assumption Religious Complex consists of the church, rectory, school, Drexel Parish Hall (former Sisters of the Blessed Sacrament Convent), the church cemetery, and St. Katharine Drexel Shrine. The complex was listed on the State and National Register of Historic Places in November 2001.

=== Historic schools ===
In 1870 Auguste Melchior, a Frenchman from New Orleans, was appointed as director of the Lafayette Parish educational system. In 1874, what was probably the first school in Carencro, was opened on his farm in town. His wife, Viviana Carencro, taught at the village school.

In 1889, Carencro had two private schools. Charles Heichelheim, a German, ran a school for boys, and Edmond Villére operated one for both boys and girls. That year, the first public school was built in Carencro. A second story was added to it 10 years later. The school became an approved high school about 1917.

About the turn of the century, Father J.B. Laforet sold three lots to Mother St. Patrick of the Sisters of Mount Carmel. They opened St. Ann's School of Carencro, in 1897.

Assumption School was built in 1932 and was staffed by the Sisters of the Blessed Sacrament. It brought together Black students from several smaller Catholic schools in the area. The school was operated with funding from Saint Katharine Drexel of New Orleans.

After the 1950s, the Sisters of the Blessed Sacrament taught at Carencro Catholic School, located at the west end of Church Street. In the early 1980s, the students of Assumption School were combined with those of St. Pierre School to form Carencro Catholic.

=== Economic prosperity ===
The Opelousas Courier reported on the young settlement at least twice during the year 1879. The April 19 edition stated, "This little village is rapidly expanding. ... The grounds of the church have been planted in trees and enclosed with a fence of a new kind. This enclosure is of iron wire and armed with steel barbs, forming a barrier inaccessible to animals."

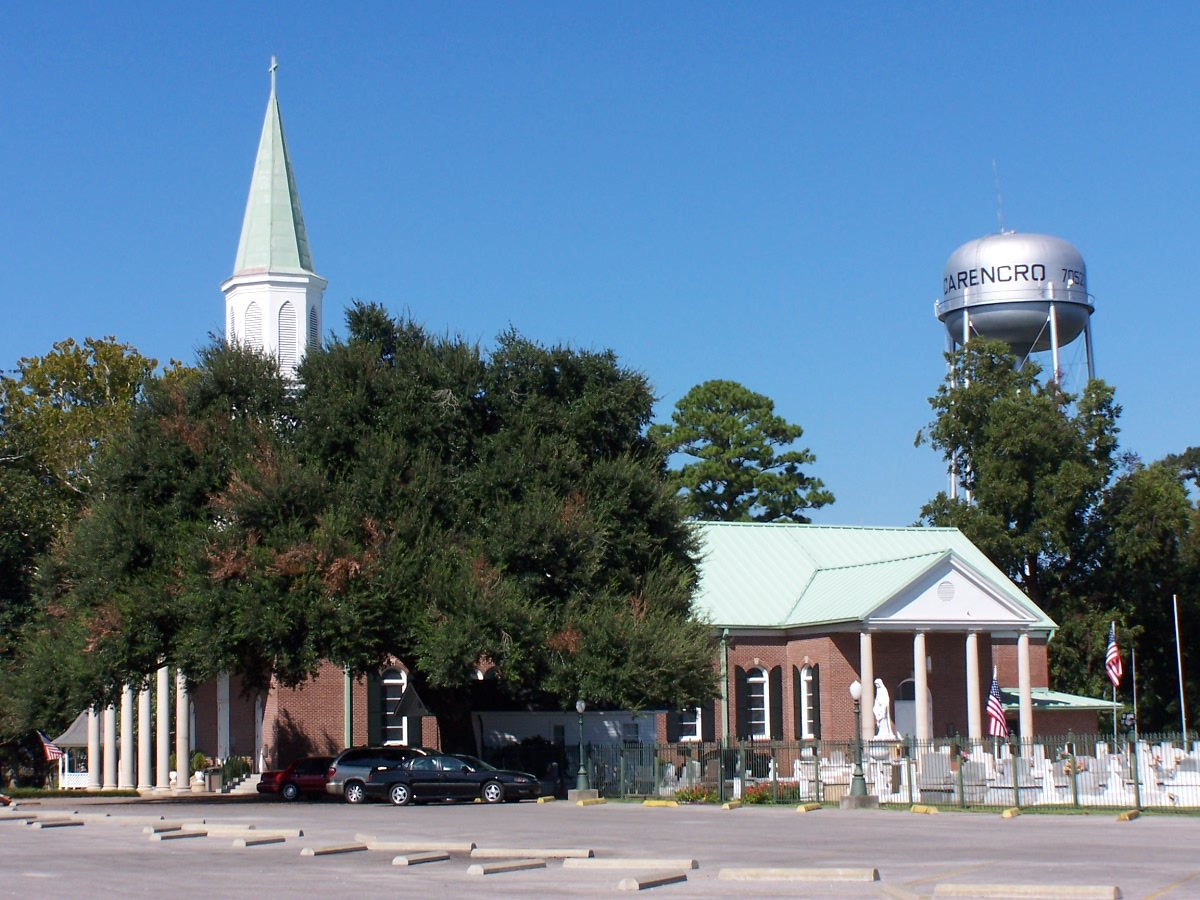
St. Peters Catholic church next to the town's water tower.

On September 6, the newspaper gave this account: "The little village of St. Pierre, at Carencro, born only a short time ago, tends to stretch itself in an astonishing fashion with numbers of buildings where all kinds of trades and professions are prospering there. Many beautiful stores, well assorted with that which meets the needs of the inhabitants, are established there since a short time ago and we note, among others, the fine establishment of Mr. Ignace Bernard near the church."

By 1889, Carencro had two sugar factories, one operated by J.C. Couvillon, and another run by I. Singleton. In 1894, Victor E. Dupuis, one of the larger cane growers of the area, formed the Carencro Sugar Company to build another sugar mill alongside Morgan's Railroad. The sugar mills in the area closed about 1900.

There were several horse-powered cotton gins in Carencro before 1876. In that year, Avignac Arceneaux built the first steam-powered gin in the parish. Four more gins were built there in the late 1880s and in the 1890s. In 1889, 1,800 bales of cotton were shipped from the Carencro Station. Cotton gins continued to operate in Carencro until the middle 1970s, when the last two, Cotton Products Co. and Farmer's Gin Co., were closed.

==== Merchants and plantation owners ====
In 1891, historian William Henry Perrin suggested that "there is no prettier site for a town (than Carencro) nor one with more solid advantages than comprised in this place. "

Among leading merchants in the 1890s were the Brown Brothers, Jacob Mitchell, D. Daret, A.G. Guilbeau, G. Schmuler, C. Micou, and J.C. Martin.

People owning large plantations near the town were Mrs. Z. Broussard, Dr. R.J. Francez, Mrs. O.C. Mouton, Louis Roger, Mrs. F. Abadie, C.C. Brown, St. Clair Kilchrist, V.C. Dupuis. and L.J. Arceneaux. Entrepreneur Charles J. Richard opened the town's lumberyard along the Southern Pacific Railroad. Nearly 100 years later, the enterprise closed during a regional economic recession in 1985.

=== Modern ===
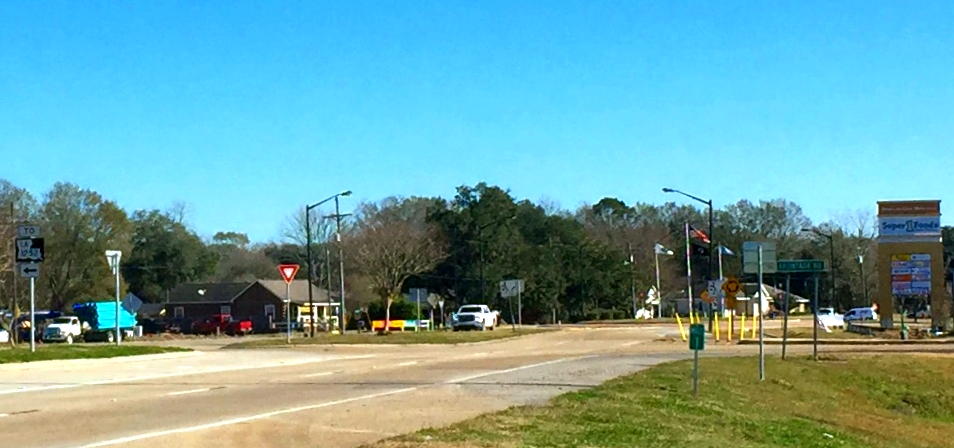
Roadside businesses along Hector Connoly Road at I-49 Frontage Road.

Carencro's St. Peter's Catholic Church and cemetery form an artistic centerpiece of the town. St. Peter's Catholic Church has an ornate cypress-carved entrance, altar and narthex, as well as intricate pew end caps. These unique end caps were designed by Catholic Frs. Wassler and Edwards (now both deceased). In one period, the pews were 'sold' to parishioners for their use at worship to raise money for the church.

Carencro notables such as former postmaster William J. Broussard and former lumberyard owner Oliver Richard are buried in this cemetery. Carencro's cemetery is above ground, unlike low-lying areas to the east in the Atchafalaya Basin and areas south of Baton Rouge. These eschew the ground-level graves of Lafayette (as well as points west and north) for mausoleums because of the high water table.

The City Hall and Fire Station complex, designed by local architect Lynn Guidry, is a modern counterpoint to the traditional Catholic church. It can be seen at the southern turn of Church Street east of U.S. 182.

== Geography ==
Carencro is located at 30°18′51″N 92°2′37″W (30.314232, -92.043614) and has an elevation of 39 feet (11.9 m). According to the United States Census Bureau, the city has a total area of 6.1 square miles (16 km^{2}), all land.

== Demographics ==
Historical population
Census	Pop.	Note	%±
1890	289		—
1900	445		54.0%
1910	609		36.9%
1920	630		3.4%
1930	684		8.6%
1940	914		33.6%
1950	1,587		73.6%
1960	1,519		−4.3%
1970	2,302		51.5%
1980	3,712		61.3%
1990	5,429		46.3%
2000	6,120		12.7%
2010	7,526		23.0%
2020	9,272		23.2%
2025 (est.)	13,224	▲	42.6%
U.S. Decennial Census

Carencro racial composition
Race	Number	Percentage
White (non-Hispanic)	4,002	43.16%
Black or African American (non-Hispanic)	4,339	46.8%
Native American	24	0.26%
Asian	88	0.95%
Pacific Islander	6	0.06%
Other/Mixed	326	3.52%
Hispanic or Latino	487	5.25%

As of the 2020 United States census, there were 9,272 people, 3,533 households, and 1,980 families residing in the city. According to the 2019 American Community Survey, its racial and ethnic makeup was 52.1% non-Hispanic white, 46.0% Black and African American, 0.1% American Indian and Alaska Native, 0.3% Asian, 1.1% some other race, and 0.3% two or more races. The median household income was $39,162 and 19.0% of the population lived at or below the poverty line.

At the 2000 U.S. census, there were 6,120 people, 2,237 households, and 1,579 families residing in the city. The population density was 1,005.9 inhabitants per square mile (388.4/km^{2}). There were 2,401 housing units at an average density of 394.6 per square mile (152.4/km^{2}). The racial makeup of the city was 56.37% White, 42.19% African American, 0.20% Native American, 0.23% Asian, 0.25% from other races, and 0.77% from two or more races. Hispanic or Latin Americans of any race were 1.09% of the population.

There were 2,237 households, out of which 39.8% had children under the age of 18 living with them, 45.4% were married couples living together, 21.1% had a female householder with no husband present, and 29.4% were non-families. 25.5% of all households were made up of individuals, and 9.3% had someone living alone who was 65 years of age or older. The average household size was 2.66 and the average family size was 3.19.

In the city, the population was spread out, with 30.2% under the age of 18, 9.2% from 18 to 24, 28.5% from 25 to 44, 19.8% from 45 to 64, and 12.3% who were 65 years of age or older. The median age was 33 years. For every 100 females, there were 88.0 males. For every 100 females age 18 and over, there were 80.5 males.

The median income for a household in the city was $22,716, and the median income for a family was $27,539. Males had a median income of $27,879 versus $21,496 for females. The per capita income for the city was $11,491. About 24.1% of families and 29.8% of the population were below the poverty line, including 42.6% of those under age 18 and 27.1% of those age 65 or over.

== Sister city ==
- Dieppe, New Brunswick, Canada
- Leuze-en-Hainaut, Belgium

== See also ==
- KDCG-CD
- KLWB-FM
