= KSMB (FM) =

Radio station in Lafayette, Louisiana

Coordinates: 30.3624°N 92.2148°W

Lafayette, Louisiana; United States
- Broadcast area: Lafayette metro; Baton Rouge metro
- Frequency: 94.5 MHz
- Branding: 94.5 KSMB

Programming
- Languages: English
- Format: Top 40 (CHR)
- Affiliations: Premiere Networks; United Stations Radio Networks; Westwood One

Ownership
- Owner: Cumulus Media; (Radio License Holding CBC, LLC)
- Sister stations: KNEK-FM, KRRQ, KXKC

History
- First air date: 1964; 61 years ago
- Call sign meaning: Southland Music Broadcasting (original owner)

Technical information
- Licensing authority: FCC
- Facility ID: 41057
- Class: C
- ERP: 100,000 watts
- HAAT: 329 meters (1,079 ft)

Links
- Public license information: Public file; LMS
- Webcast: Listen live
- Website: ksmb.com

KSMB (94.5 MHz, "94.5 KSMB") is a top 40 (CHR) radio station in Lafayette, Louisiana, owned by Cumulus Media. Its studios are located on Galbert Road in Lafayette, and its transmitter is located south of Church Point, Louisiana.

== History ==
KSMB began broadcasting in 1964 as Lafayette's first FM station. Its call letters stand for Southland Music Broadcasting, the station's original owner.

Through the 1960s it featured a strictly Cajun, swamp pop and zydeco Americana format. By the 1970s, the station had established an AOR format as "K94 The Stereo Rock". In late 1984, the format was gradually shifted to top 40 as "HitRadio 94½", a process completed by October. This branding lasted until 1994, when it became "94.5 KSMB".

Citadel Broadcasting purchased KSMB from Powell Broadcasting in 1999. Citadel merged with Cumulus Media on September 16, 2011.
