= KXKW-LD =

Television station in Lafayette, Louisiana

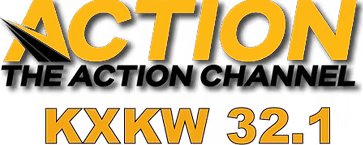

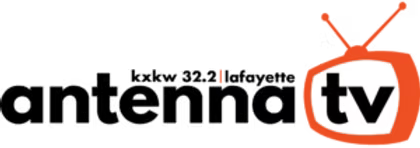
- Lafayette, Louisiana; United States
- Channels: Digital: 30 (UHF); Virtual: 32

Programming
- Affiliations: 32.1: The Action Channel; for others, see § Subchannels

Ownership
- Owner: Delta Media Corporation
- Sister stations: KDCG-CD, KLWB

History
- First air date: 1991
- Former call signs: K21DM (1991–1995); KLFT-LP (1995–April 2009); KXKW-CA (April–August 2009)
- Former channel numbers: Analog: 21 (UHF, 1991−2009), 6 (VHF, 2009–2021); Digital: 32 (UHF, 2009–2021)
- Former affiliations: The Box (1991–1999); Pax TV (via KDCG-LP, 1999–2004); UATV (2004–2006); The Sportsman Channel (2006–2007); Independent (2007−2011); This TV (2011–2016); Stadium (2016−2021); NewsNet (2021–2024); ShopHQ (2024)

Technical information
- Licensing authority: FCC
- Facility ID: 167755
- Class: LD
- ERP: 15 kW
- HAAT: 275.5 m (904 ft)
- Transmitter coordinates: 30°20′33″N 91°57′46.6″W

Links
- Public license information: LMS

KXKW-LD (channel 32) is a low-power television station in Lafayette, Louisiana, United States. It is owned by Delta Media Corporation alongside dual MeTV/Telemundo affiliate KLWB (channel 50) and Class A Heroes & Icons affiliate KDCG-CD (channel 22). The three stations share studios on Evangeline Thruway in Carencro; KXKW-LD's transmitter is located northeast of Lafayette.

KXKW-LP (channel 6) was an LPTV station also licensed to Lafayette. The station's primary content was the audio programming on the aural carrier of 87.74 MHz and using a 19 kHz stereo pilot carrier with 75 kHz deviation. This could be received on many FM broadcast receivers, and as a result KXKW-LP marketed itself as an FM radio station. The station aired a Regional Mexican format under the brand "Radio Lazer". To meet the legal requirements for visual content, the station ran a feed of the local National Weather Service radar.

== History ==
KXKW-LP signed on in 1991 as K21DM from Sunset. At the time, it was one of many low-power affiliates of the now-defunct Video Jukebox Network, which later became known simply as "The Box". K21DN changed its calls to KLFT-LP in 1995 and moved from Sunset to Lafayette shortly thereafter.

In 1999, KLFT-LP dropped its music video format when programming time was leased to KDCG-LP, which used the station to simulcast its Pax programming. After not having a strong enough signal to warrant must-carry status on the Lafayette cable system, KDCG ended the LMA in 2004. Without any programming to air, the station aired nothing but a webcam image of its transmitting equipment with a posterboard reading "KLFT-LP LAFAYETTE" attached, intended to keep the station from losing its license for not properly identifying itself or being off the air for a long period of time. In October 2004, KLFT began airing programming from the Urban America Television network. After hurricanes Katrina and Rita, the station ran community service information 24 hours a day. UATV suspended operations in May 2006, upon which the Sportsman Channel replaced its feed.

On October 1, 2007, programming was changed at the station, including old sitcoms like The Andy Griffith Show and a showcase for old horror movies called Boogeyman Theater. On April 2, 2009, the station changed the call sign to KXKW-CA. The -CA denoted that the station was a Class A low-power television station, giving it protection to its signal area (which normal low power stations do not have).

Upon the digital TV transition on June 12, 2009, Delta Media simultaneously moved the visual programming of KXKW-CA to KXKW-LD (which, despite sharing call letters, never simulcast KXKW-CA's programming), moved KXKW-CA from channel 21 to channel 6, and launched the station as a simulcast of KSLO-FM radio. Two months later, the station gave up its class A classification and became KXKW-LP.

On December 26, 2012, the "Mustang 87.7" format launched on KXKW-LP, simulcasting KOGM 107.1.

In 2011, KXKW-LD would go from Independent to This TV, when KLWB signed on with Weigel's MeTV. On July 1, 2015, Antenna TV moved to 32.2 when Delta Media Corporation launched H&I on KDCG-CD and exactly a year later (July 1, 2016) This TV was dropped on 32.1 being replaced by Sinclair Broadcast Group's Stadium. On March 14, 2021, NewsNet launched on KXKW's main channel while Stadium moved to the station's DT3 slot. NewsNet shut down on in August 2024, and the station became affiliated with home shopping network The Action Channel and simulcast of sister station KLWB-FM 103.7 on 32.3.

On October 16, 2024, KXKW announced that New Orleans Pelicans games produced by Gulf Coast Sports & Entertainment Network (GCSEN) would air on the station for the 2024–25 season, as GCSEN did not yet have a station in Lafayette. An Iowa-licensed and Gray-owned translator station of Lake Charles station KGCH-LD (channel 32) launched in time for the 2025–26 season on KNGC-LD (channel 25), taking the GCSEN affiliation in the market.

== Subchannels ==
The station's signal is multiplexed:

Subchannels of KXKW-LD
Channel	Res.	Short name	Programming
32.1	720p	Action	The Action Channel
32.2	480i	KXKWATV	Antenna TV (4:3)
32.3	Audio only	Sports	Simulcast of KLWB-FM 103.7
32.4	480i	TRCRIME	True Crime Network
32.5	480i	Quest	Quest
