= KLWB (TV) =

Television station in New Iberia, Louisiana

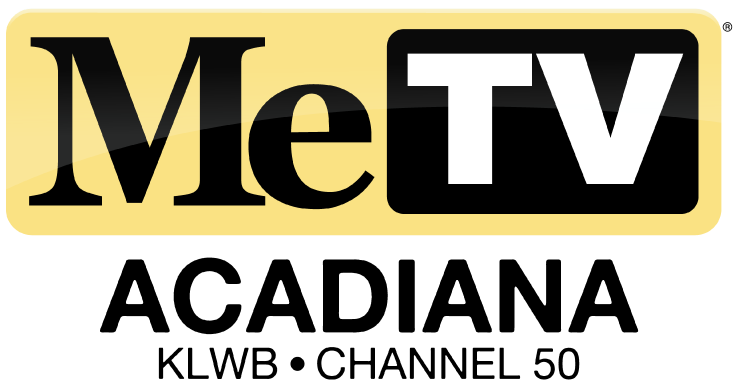
- New Iberia–Lafayette, Louisiana; United States
- City: New Iberia, Louisiana
- Channels: Digital: 17 (UHF); Virtual: 50
- Branding: MeTV Acadiana

Programming
- Affiliations: 50.1: MeTV; for others, see § Subchannels

Ownership
- Owner: Delta Media Corporation; (Wilderness Communications, LLC)
- Sister stations: KLWB-FM, KFXZ-FM, KXKW-LD, KDCG-CD

History
- Founded: June 12, 1996
- First air date: April 3, 2006
- Former channel numbers: Analog: 50 (UHF, 2006–2009); Digital: 50 (UHF, 2009–2019)
- Former affiliations: The WB (2006); The CW (2006–2010); This TV (2010–2011)
- Call sign meaning: Lafayette's WB (former affiliation), and "L" can also stand for its channel number 50 as a Roman numeral

Technical information
- Licensing authority: FCC
- Facility ID: 82476
- ERP: 1,000 kW
- HAAT: 303.1 m (994 ft)
- Transmitter coordinates: 30°20′33″N 91°57′46.6″W

Links
- Public license information: Public file; LMS
- Website: www.metvacadiana.com

KLWB (channel 50) is a television station licensed to New Iberia, Louisiana, United States, serving the Lafayette area as an affiliate of MeTV and Telemundo. It is owned by Delta Media Corporation alongside low-power station KXKW-LD (channel 32) and Class A station KDCG-CD (channel 22). The three stations share studios on Evangeline Thruway in Carencro; KLWB's transmitter is located on West Wilderness Trail in northern Lafayette Parish.

== History ==
KLWB originated in 1999 as a cable-only affiliate of The WB, via The WB 100+. It was branded as "Acadiana's WB" and was known as "WB 2" and later "WB 10", based on its cable position. Its broadcast signal began broadcasting on April 3, 2006. Soon afterward, it began to be carried by DirecTV (which previously imported WBZL in Miami and WNUV in Baltimore for WB programming) and Dish Network. The station joined The CW upon its formation that September, carrying The WB 100+'s successor, The CW Plus.

KLWB lost its CW affiliation to a subchannel of KATC (channel 3) on June 14, 2010. At that time, the station switched to This TV (which had previously been carried on one of KLWB's subchannels, as well as on sister station KXKW-LD). The station also moved to channel 23 on Cox Cable (its previous position, channel 10, is now occupied by the KATC subchannel). On July 25, 2011, KLWB began airing MeTV on its main channel.

Beginning in fall 2011, KLWB became part of the Southland Conference Television Network, airing live sporting events from that league.

On March 30, 2012, Delta Media (Wilderness Communications) purchased then-RTV affiliate KDCG from Acadiana Cable Advertising and added the station on channel 50.2.

On August 1, 2012, KDCG switched affiliations from RTV to Antenna TV and in the process Antenna TV was moved to 50.2, RTV was moved to 50.3 but was dropped from the lineup months later.

On July 1, 2015, Heroes & Icons launched on 22.1 subchannel, (This TV on 22.2), and KLWB-DT2 stemming from an agreement between Delta Media Corporation and Weigel Broadcasting of Chicago and Antenna TV launched on KXKW-LD2.

On July 1, 2016, American Sports Network, now Stadium was launched replacing This TV, which was also removed from KDCG-CD2, which remained silent until November 2019 when it began carrying MeTV (as a simulcast of KLWB) while that channel relocated its digital channel from 50 to 17.

On November 30, 2019, KLWB relaunched its digital signal on channel 17, using virtual channel 50.

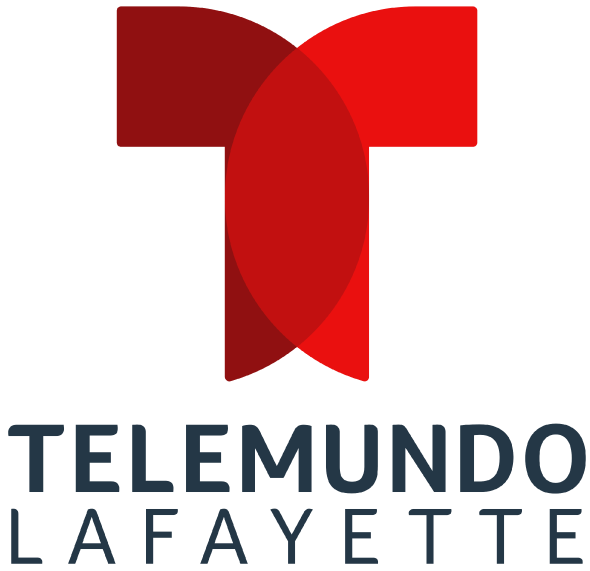
Telemundo Lafayette logo on KLWB-DT3 from January 22, 2020 to December 31, 2025.

On January 22, 2020, Telemundo was added to 50.3.

On March 15, 2021, Delta Media executives announced the addition of several new networks on its stations. Start TV launched on May 7 on KLWB-DT4. Cozi TV launched on June 14 on KLWB-DT5. Buzzr launched on sister station KDCG's third subchannel on January 21, 2022, Tegna's Twist (KDCG 22.4)/True Crime Network/Quest (KXKW-LD 32.4 & 32.5) on November 21, 2022, Story Television on KLWB 50.6 February 22, 2023, and Movies! on January 1, 2024 (replacing the now defunct Twist).

On December 31, 2025, it was announced that the Telemundo affiliate would be removed from the station and moved to KNGC-LD on 25.2 and took effect on January 1, 2026.

== Technical information ==
=== Subchannels ===
The station's signal is multiplexed:

Subchannels of KLWB
Channel	Res.	Short name	Programming
50.1	720p	KLWB DT	MeTV
50.2	480i	KDCG TV	Great (KDCG-CD)
50.3	1080i	KLWB D3	NBC True CRMZ
50.4	480i	StartTV	Start TV
50.5	480i	COZI TV	Cozi TV
50.6	480i	StoryTV	Story Television

Simulcast of subchannels of another station

=== Analog-to-digital conversion ===
KLWB shut down its analog signal, over UHF channel 50, on June 12, 2009, and "flash-cut" its digital signal into operation on channel 50. Because it was granted an original construction permit after the FCC finalized the DTV allotment plan on April 21, 1997, the station did not receive a companion channel for a digital television station.
