= KDCG-CD =

Television station in Opelousas, Louisiana

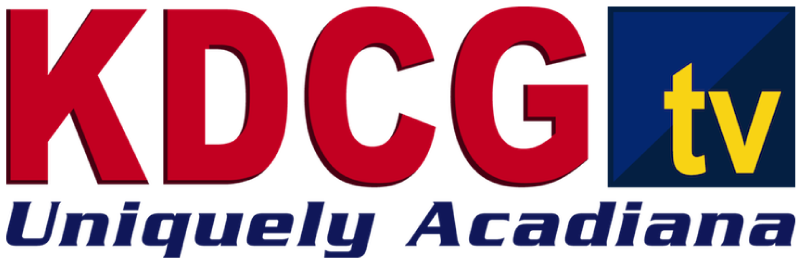
- Opelousas–Lafayette, Louisiana; United States
- City: Opelousas, Louisiana
- Channels: Digital: 22 (UHF); Virtual: 22
- Branding: KDCG TV

Programming
- Affiliations: 22.1: Heroes & Icons; for others, see § Subchannels

Ownership
- Owner: Delta Media Corporation
- Sister stations: KLWB, KXKW-LD

History
- Founded: February 1996
- First air date: 1996
- Former call signs: K22EP (1994−1996)
- Former affiliations: Independent (1996−1998); Pax TV (1998−2003); The Sportsman Channel; America One (2005−2009); FamilyNet (1994–2017); RTV (2007−2012); Antenna TV (2012−2015); This TV (2015−2016)
- Call sign meaning: Dupre Carrier Godchaux (co-owned insurance agency)

Technical information
- Licensing authority: FCC
- Facility ID: 349
- Class: LD
- ERP: 15 kW
- HAAT: 279 m (915 ft)
- Transmitter coordinates: 30°20′33″N 91°57′46.6″W

Links
- Public license information: Public file; LMS
- Website: kdcg.com

KDCG-CD (channel 22) is a low-power, Class A television station licensed to Opelousas, Louisiana, United States, serving the Lafayette area as an affiliate of Heroes & Icons. It is owned by Delta Media Corporation alongside dual MeTV/Telemundo affiliate KLWB (channel 50) and low-power station KXKW-LD (channel 32). The three stations share studios on Evangeline Thruway in Carencro; KDCG-CD's transmitter is located northeast of Lafayette.

== History ==
It signed on in 1996 as an independent station serving Opelousas with a focus on family entertainment programming and broadcasting local news. The station gained its first network affiliation by affiliating with Pax TV (now Ion Television) in 1998. It has had numerous affiliations, primary and secondary, ever since. It was previously associated with Antenna TV, Retro Television Network and America One, while also airing programming from The Sportsman Channel, FamilyNet, America's Voice, and the Pandamerica Shopping Network. KDCG dropped Pax TV when the Lafayette cable system chose to add the network's national feed to its lineup instead of the local station due to signal reception issues.

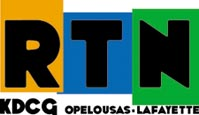
KDCG logo while RTV was branded RTN

On November 8, 2007, KDCG joined the Retro Television Network and changed branding to "RTN KDCG". At this time, programming from the Sportsman Channel was reduced to a limited basis, whenever the signal from RTN is off the air, plus some scheduled programming weekdays and Sunday mornings. The branding was changed again to "RTV 22.1" upon RTN's own rebranding to RTV and KDCG's flash-cut to digital broadcasts.

On August 15, 2006, after a long and drawn-out negotiation process, KDCG was added to Cox Communications' Acadiana cable system, reaching viewers in Abbeville, Crowley, Franklin, Lafayette, New Iberia, and St. Martinville. KDCG previously offered a live video feed of its programming over the Internet, a practice that ended in the late 2000s.

On March 30, 2012, Delta Media purchased KDCG from Acadiana Cable Advertising and added the station to the second subchannel of KLWB (50.2). On August 1 that year, KDCG changed its affiliation from RTV to Antenna TV on 22.1 and 50.2. RTV was switched to KLWB's third subchannel thereafter and eventually dropped from the station altogether a few months later. On July 1, 2015, KDCG changed its affiliation again, this time adding Weigel's newest diginet Heroes & Icons on 22.2 with This TV (simulcast off sister station KXKW-LD) broadcasting on 22.1, however, Delta Media kept Antenna TV by launching it on KXKW-LD with Tribune Media's other owned diginet This TV. When KDCG dropped its affiliation with This TV on June 30 the following year and affiliated with American Sports Network, its second subchannel went silent. It was announced mid-2022 that a fourth subchannel will launch with Tegna's Twist airing at a later date. On November 21, 2022, Twist made its official launch on KDCG and sister station K29NX-D out of Alexandria, Louisiana. On January 1, 2024, Twist ceased operations and 22.4 was replaced with Movies!.

In 2017, Delta Media moved KDCG-CD from its location on LA 182 in Opelousas to their main office in Carencro, Louisiana.

== Subchannels ==
The station's signal is multiplexed:

Subchannels of KDCG-CD
| Channel | Res. | Short name | Programming |
|---|---|---|---|
| 22.1 | 480i | KDCG 22 | Heroes & Icons |
| 22.2 | 480i | Get TV | Great (4:3) |
| 22.3 | 480i | BuzzrTV | Buzzr |
| 22.4 | 480i | Movies! | Movies! |
