= Foxnet =

National cable feed of Fox for smaller markets (1991–2006)

- Type: Basic cable network (general entertainment and national network programming service)
- Country: United States
- Broadcast area: Nationwide (available mainly in smaller television markets)
- Network: Fox
- Headquarters: Los Angeles, California

Programming
- Language: English
- Picture format: 480i (SDTV)
- Timeshift service: Foxnet East; Foxnet West

Ownership
- Owner: News Corporation
- Parent: Fox Entertainment Group

History
- Founded: September 6, 1990; 36 years ago
- Launched: June 6, 1991; 35 years ago
- Founder: Jamie Kellner
- Closed: September 12, 2006; 20 years ago (generic national Fox feed has been offered in the event of affiliate clearance and disruption incidences since 2017)

Foxnet was a national cable programming service of the Fox Broadcasting Company (known simply as Fox) that was owned by the Fox Entertainment Group division of News Corporation. The service, which operated (in its original form) from June 6, 1991 to September 12, 2006, was intended for American television markets ranked #100 and above by Nielsen Media Research estimates that lacked availability for a locally based Fox broadcast affiliate.

Foxnet acted as a nationalized programming feed offering Fox prime time, sports and children's programming, and a master schedule of syndicated entertainment and brokered programs that were broadcast outside of time periods designated for Fox programming. Fox handled programming, advertising and promotional services for the service at its Fox Network Center corporate headquarters at the Fox Studio Lot in the Century City district of Los Angeles.

Since 2017, Fox (owned by indirect successor Fox Corporation since 2019) has at times provided a generic national feed of the network (identified as "Foxnet" on certain interactive program guides) to selected cable and virtual multichannel video programming distributors (vMVPD) without access to a local or nearby Fox station, or in the event that a local affiliate is off the air temporarily due to transmitter damage caused by severe weather.

== History ==
=== Background ===
At the time of the service's launch in 1991, Fox's programming reached only 91% of all U.S. households with at least one television set, giving it the lowest nationwide coverage among the four largest American broadcast networks of the time. This was because, around the time of the network's launch in October 1986, most large and mid-sized markets were served by at least four commercial over-the-air television stations: three that were each affiliated with one of the established broadcast networks, ABC, NBC and CBS; and at least one that usually operated as an independent station, typically offering a mix of syndicated programs, movies and in many cases, sports. Independents, most of which had no prior history as a major network affiliate, made up the vast majority of Fox's charter affiliates (in most cases, the network aligned with the highest-rated independent within a particular market).

Many smaller markets, however, were served by three or fewer commercial stations, most of which were already affiliated with at least one of the existing major broadcast networks. This issue left Fox's only options to reach these areas being to either settle for a secondary affiliation with one of the major network stations (which would have forced Fox programs to air in off-peak timeslots subject to lower viewership or in a hodgepodge of program and timeslot clearances), going with a station owned by a religious broadcaster which could block portions of their schedule based on moral concerns (which actually was the cause of Fox terminating several affiliations in its early days), or affiliate with a spare low-power station, which often maintained low-quality schedules prevalent with home shopping or paid programming outside of prime time and were usually associated with smaller networks such as Channel America; the network rarely utilized these options in order to not associate their programming with low-effort stations and networks, leaving it with gaps in national clearance in several smaller markets, while it only began maintaining secondary affiliations on Big Three stations starting in 1994 to distribute their NFL coverage in selected smaller markets ranked below #75 in the Nielsen and Arbitron television market rankings until a standalone station could launch.

To expand its distribution to these areas, original network president Jamie Kellner (who would remain in the role until his departure in 1993, when he co-founded Time Warner and the Tribune Company's network venture The WB) developed the concept of a national cable feed of Fox that would provide the network's programming to smaller television markets throughout the United States where the network could not maintain an exclusive over-the-air affiliation – known as "white areas" – due to the limited number of commercial television stations available or where a local cable provider did not import the signal of an out-of-market Fox station to act as a default affiliate of the network.

=== Development and launch ===
On September 6, 1990, Fox reached an agreement with Tele-Communications Inc. – at the time, the nation's largest cable operator – in which TCI systems in certain markets would become charter affiliates of a cable-only version of the network, breaking the traditional method of broadcast networks offering their programming to over-the-air television stations that distribute their signals and content to local cable systems. John C. Malone, then the chief executive officer of TCI, referred to the agreement as "precedent setting" since it allowed TCI systems to obtain "network affiliate status" in places where Fox programming was not available. When it launched, Fox charged smaller cable providers that agreed to carry Foxnet a flat annual carriage fee of $100, instead of the monthly fees traditionally charged by other broadcast and cable channels; in turn, TCI agreed to pay Fox a subscriber fee of 6¢ per month, a precursor to the reverse compensation revenue model that Fox and other broadcast networks would adopt for their conventional stations by the early 2000s.

Foxnet launched on June 6, 1991, originally maintaining an 18-hour daily schedule (from 6:00 a.m. to 1:00 a.m. Eastern and Pacific Time). The service maintained a master schedule of programs intended for broadcast syndication from various distributors (some sourced from then-sister company 20th Television) and brokered programming to pad out its broadcast day outside of Fox programming hours, utilizing a general entertainment format similar to that of the parent network's broadcast stations during that timeframe. (At the time Foxnet debuted, Fox only offered a limited schedule of prime time programs—two hours Thursday through Saturday, and four hours on Sundays—and the nascent Fox Kids block, then consisting of a three-hour Saturday morning lineup as well as a single half-hour program each weekday.) Foxnet's inaugural schedule consisted mostly of theatrical and made-for-TV movies, and reruns of classic and obscure television series from the 1960s, 1970s and 1980s (such as The Ann Sothern Show, Husbands, Wives & Lovers, The Felony Squad and Peyton Place); separate national advertising airing within syndicated programs and local ad slots during Fox network shows mainly consisted per inquiry ads and public service announcements in its early years.

During its existence, the service never officially identified itself specifically as "Foxnet" on-air; its network identifications consisted solely of the Fox logo in use at the time, with a voiceover reading "you're watching Fox." (Separate logos incorporating Foxnet branding were used to advertise the service in media publications and promotional materials for prospective providers.) Timeslot cards and verbal continuity announcements promoting the service's syndicated programs identified show airtimes by Eastern Time Zone scheduling (sometimes accompanied by Central Time references, mirroring conventional network promotions). By 1992, Foxnet reached 1.3 million subscribers throughout the United States, and served nearly two million viewers at its peak.

As Fox expanded its presence to most television markets through primary affiliations with full-power or low-power broadcast television stations (the latter now more well-associated under the ownership of other full-power stations, and refusing the low-quality networks and paid programming prevalent in the early low-power era), and by the mid-2000s, carriage on digital subchannels of stations affiliated with other broadcast networks, Foxnet's coverage had in turn shrunk to the point where very few areas had a need for the service. In addition, most cable providers in markets that remained unserved by a local Fox station until it acquired a standalone primary or subchannel-only affiliation began importing out-of-market affiliates to relay the network's programming (in many cases, replacing Foxnet on the provider's lineup), or in rare cases, partnered with an already-existing major network affiliate to create a dedicated Fox cable channel (one such example was "CGEM" in the Hannibal, Missouri/Quincy, Illinois media market, which was initially operated by NBC affiliate WGEM-TV and Continental Cablevision at the time of its launch in 1994 before migrating to a digital subchannel of WGEM-TV in 2006). Foxnet was also carried in portions of some larger media markets where a reliable signal from an over-the-air affiliate or a translator was not receivable; one such example included Eastern Iowa (where KOCR's signal—partly due to its transmitter’s shorter than typical height for an analog UHF station—only covered Cedar Rapids and Iowa City, and did not reach the Cedar Rapids market’s two other major cities, Waterloo or Dubuque; Foxnet was carried across most of Eastern Iowa between October 1994 and August 1995, when KFXB-TV switched affiliations from ABC to Fox, as KOCR was off the air during that time owing to financial issues).

Viewers in Foxnet markets that subscribed to a direct broadcast satellite service also had the ability to watch an out-of-market Fox station via a given provider after receiving permission from the network: DirecTV and Dish Network subscribers could receive network-owned KTTV (channel 11) from Los Angeles or WNYW (channel 5) from New York City; until that provider's 1999 merger with DirecTV, subscribers of Primestar could receive either Oakland/San Francisco affiliate KTVU (channel 2, also now a Fox owned-and-operated station) or Philadelphia affiliate-turned-O&O WTXF-TV (channel 29). However, in some cases, satellite subscribers could receive the Fox station with rights to the network's programming within the market. As a result, some areas that were not served by a Fox affiliate at the time of the network's launch never offered Foxnet; examples included Palm Springs, California (which was served by KTTV prior to KDFX-CD's September 1994 switch from CBS to Fox), South Bend, Indiana (which was served by WFLD/Chicago, WXMI/Grand Rapids, WFFT-TV/Fort Wayne and, until the network moved to former CBS affiliate WJBK in December 1994, WKBD-TV/Detroit—with Fox’s NFL coverage and selected entertainment programs airing locally on CBS affiliate WSBT-TV starting in September 1994—prior to WSJV's October 1995 switch from ABC to Fox) and the western portion of the Plattsburgh/Burlington market (which was mostly served by WNYW prior to WFFF-TV's August 1997 sign-on).

From October 2001 to April 2003, most Fox programming in the state of Maine was only available via Foxnet, as WPXT (which served as the network's Portland affiliate) disaffiliated from the network to join The WB after affiliation renewal negotiations between then-owner Pegasus Broadcasting and Fox broke down; that station had been carried by cable providers in Bangor since the network's launch. When WPFO and WFVX-LD affiliated with Fox in the respective markets, Foxnet was relegated to the Presque Isle area, which was one of the last remaining markets without a local Fox affiliate. A similar situation happened in the Jackson, Mississippi market, when WDBD (also affected by the Pegasus–Fox dispute) initially disaffiliated from the network at that time also to join The WB; WDBD would eventually reaffiliate with Fox in 2006, taking the affiliation from WUFX (which signed on in September 2003, now WLOO).

=== Discontinuation ===
As time went on, more local or adjacent-market Fox affiliates became available over-the-air or on cable in smaller markets. Eventually, Foxnet's national coverage was reduced to the level where it was only carried on a few small cable systems, none of which had more than 1,000 subscribers. As such, it no longer made economic sense for the service to remain on the air. It was for this reason that Fox's then-owner News Corporation (whose entertainment assets were largely spun off into 21st Century Fox in July 2013) made the decision to discontinue Foxnet. The service officially shut down on September 12, 2006; it was originally slated to cease operations two weeks earlier on September 1, but the shutdown was delayed in order to allow ABC affiliate WABG-TV in Greenwood, Mississippi and CBS affiliate WAGM-TV in Presque Isle time to quickly launch Fox affiliates on their second digital subchannels.

Because of Foxnet's shutdown, 13,000 cable subscribers nationwide were estimated to have lost access to Fox network programming. By this time, the network's market share had increased to 98.97% of all U.S. television households. Indeed, network executives had been looking forward to the point that its national penetration had increased to the level that Foxnet would no longer be needed. (Note: Affiliates of other networks, like the now-defunct UPN, also aired Fox programming.)

The concept and programming strategy behind Foxnet served as the basis for The WB 100+ Station Group, a service owned by Time Warner and Tribune that operated from September 1998 to September 2006 – which was succeeded by The CW Plus, once The WB and UPN were shut down and replaced by The CW in September 2006 – for markets that did not have a WB-affiliated station. Though unlike Foxnet, The WB 100+, which was also co-founded by Kellner, was stylized (to an extent) similarly to an over-the-air broadcast station and local operators were allowed to tailor the service to their individual market with their own branding, with some of the outlets even carrying local news or sports programming. Foxnet, however, was formatted in the manner of a traditional cable channel with no local programming content provided by its carriers.

=== 2017-present: Partial revival with Hulu and as emergency backup service ===
In May 2017, Hulu (then partially owned by 21st Century Fox, Fox's owner at the time) launched an optional live TV offering that included feeds of local Fox O&Os and affiliates which had agreed to contractual terms to distribute their programming through the streaming service. In June 2017, The Wall Street Journal (a sister newspaper to Fox through the Murdoch family's shared ownership of News Corp) mentioned that Fox had offered a secondary national feed to serve selected markets where local affiliates (mainly those owned by Sinclair Broadcast Group and Raycom Media) had not come to terms with Hulu to provide access to their station feeds.

The national Fox live feed, however, differs drastically from the structure of Foxnet in that secondary programming from Fox's sister cable networks, including Fox News Channel and Fox Business Network, and previously National Geographic Channel and Nat Geo Wild (both now majority-owned by The Walt Disney Company through its 2019 acquisition of 20th Century Fox and most Fox Entertainment Group assets from the Murdochs), is offered outside of network programming hours, rather than any syndicated content. Like Foxnet, this national feed is likely to eventually be discontinued as Fox and the network's affiliates agree to terms allowing full streaming of their stations on the Hulu live TV service and other streaming live television providers under future affiliation agreements.

After the landfall of Hurricane Laura in August 2020, KVHP, the Fox affiliate for Lake Charles, Louisiana, was taken off the air as its studio facility (shared with fellow Gray Television-owned NBC affiliate KPLC) sustained damage when their studio transmitter link tower toppled into the building. Fox then fed its default national feed meant for streaming use to local cable providers until KVHP resumed full operations at the end of 2020. Fox also provided the default national feed to YouTube TV subscribers in the Tallahassee, Florida market in September 2024, after that provider lost access to WTWC-DT2 (as well as its Sinclair-owned parent NBC affiliate, which was temporarily replaced by that network's New York City flagship station WNBC) amid the landfall of Hurricane Helene.

== Programming ==
Foxnet aired the Fox network's primetime schedule and its children's programming blocks (originally Fox Kids, then FoxBox/4Kids TV from September 2002 onward); beginning with the network's assumption of rights to the NFL's National Football Conference in September 1994, it also carries telecasts of sporting events produced by the Fox Sports division, though being a national service having to choose from certain games rather than taking regional coverage, it was possible for an NHL, NFL or MLB matchup with teams with no rooting interest in a certain area to be of no interest to those viewers. In some areas where Foxnet was offered, affiliates of other networks carried secondary affiliations with Fox to air the network's sports programming (and in some areas, children's or selected prime time programming) over-the-air; during this time, some cable systems blacked out Foxnet whenever sports programming was aired due to syndex laws.

Otherwise, a dual programming model was utilized for Foxnet that differed from the traditional affiliate model – in which the local station handled responsibilities for acquiring and scheduling syndicated and local programming to fill timeslots not occupied by network content – that is used by Fox stations in large and medium-sized markets. Fox maintained responsibility over the programming of timeslots within Foxnet's schedule that were not occupied by Fox network programming, absolving the local cable provider of the duty of having to acquire syndicated programming to fill timeslots outside of Fox's network schedule. The acquired programs primarily consisted of shows that were airing at the time in national syndication and classic television series; syndicated film packages – with most titles being sourced from the library of then-sister studio 20th Century Fox – usually filled select weekend timeslots (which following the incorporation of Fox Sports in 1994, began to be limited to weekend time periods that were not occupied by sports programming), and, until 1993, primetime slots (Fox began offering primetime shows seven nights a week in the fall of that year). Fox also leased time to direct response program producers and ministries to carry brokered programming (such as infomercials and religious programs) during overnight and some morning and early afternoon timeslots.

Foxnet was designed for the Eastern and Pacific Time Zones; as such, the Fox Kids and (from September 2002 to September 2006, after the network leased its children's programming to 4Kids Entertainment) 4Kids TV blocks, which were designed to be tape-delayed, were aired an hour early on affiliates in other time zones. As the network was carried as a cable network without any broadcast distribution, the FCC's educational content regulations for children's programming did not need to be fulfilled, nor was it subject to any FCC regulations which applied to broadcast networks.

Foxnet carried one original program, The Spud Goodman Show, a talk show that aired Sunday nights at 10:00 p.m. Eastern Time – following the conclusion of Fox's primetime lineup – from 1996 to 1998. Though Fox did not carry any national news programming of its own at the time of its launch (and only has one news program presently on its schedule in the form of the political talk show Fox News Sunday), Foxnet did carry a simulcast of sister network Fox News Channel's daily evening newscast Fox Report in the 10:00 p.m. (Eastern) time slot from February 1999 until the service's discontinuation.

=== Dramas ===
- Action Pack (1994–2001) (excluding Jack of All Trades and Cleopatra 2525)
- The Adventures of Sinbad (1996–97)
- Alias Smith and Jones (1993–96)
- Automan (1991–92)
- Bat Masterson (2003–05)
- Baywatch (1995–2001)
- Baywatch Nights (1995–96)
- Beverly Hills, 90210 (1994–98)
- Beyond Reality (1995–96)
- The Big Valley (2002–03)
- Black Sheep Squadron (1993–94)
- Blue Light (1991)
- Bracken's World (1991–92)
- Breaking Away (1991–92)
- Cade's County (1991–93)
- Cagney & Lacey (2003–05)
- Catwalk (1992–93)
- Code 3 (1993)
- Conan the Adventurer (1997–98)
- The Crow: Stairway to Heaven (1998–99)
- Custer (1991–93)
- The Fall Guy (2002–06)
- Fame (2003–04)
- Felony Squad (1991–92)
- Flipper (1995–96)
- F/X: The Series (1996–97)
- Half Nelson (1991)
- Heart of the City (1992)
- Heaven Help Us (1994–95)
- The High Chaparral (1992–93)
- Highlander: The Series (1992–98)
- The Hitchhiker (1995–97)
- I Spy (1998–2000)
- The Invisible Man (2001–04)
- It Takes a Thief (1993–94)
- James at 15 (1991–92)
- Judd, for the Defense (1991–92)
- Knight Rider (2002–03)
- Kojak (2003–06)
- Leg Work (1992)
- The Love Boat (1992–99)
- Manimal (1991–92)
- M.A.N.T.I.S. (2003–04)
- Maximum Exposure (2000–02)
- Movin' On (1991)
- One West Waikiki (1995–96)
- The Outer Limits (2001–05)
- Outlaws (1992–94)
- Pensacola: Wings of Gold (1997–2000)
- Peyton Place (1991–95)
- PSI Factor: Chronicles of the Paranormal (1998–99)
- Queen of Swords (2000–01)
- Quincy M.E. (2002–06)
- Relic Hunter (2001–02)
- Remington Steele (2004–06)
- Renegade (1995–96)
- Return of the Saint (1993)
- Robin's Hoods (1994–95)
- The Saint (1992–93)
- Secret Agent (1992)
- She Spies (2003–05)
- Simon & Simon (1993–95)
- St. Elsewhere (2005–06)
- Stargate SG-1 (2001–05)
- Strike Force (1991)
- Switch (1994–95)
- Tales from the Crypt (1994–97)
- Tarzan: The Epic Adventures (1996–97)
- Trapper John, M.D. (2002–03)
- University Hospital (1995)
- The Virginian (1993–95; 2003–04)
- The Wizard (1991–92)

=== Comedies ===
- The Addams Family (2004–05)
- The Ann Sothern Show (1991–92)
- The Bob Newhart Show (2004–06)
- Boy Meets World (1998–2000)
- California Dreams (1993–95; 1996–98)
- Charlie & Co. (1991–92)
- Doogie Howser, M.D. (1996)
- Eye for an Eye (2005–06)
- The Ghost and Mrs. Muir (1992)
- Green Acres (2003–05)
- Have Faith (1991)
- HBO Comedy Showcase (1994–99)
- Home Improvement (1998–2001)
- Honey, I Shrunk the Kids: The TV Show (1997–2000)
- House Calls (1993–96)
- How to Marry a Millionaire (1992–94)
- Karen (1991–92)
- In Living Color (1993)
- The Mary Tyler Moore Show (2004–06)
- Mister Ed (2003–05)
- The Munsters (1993)
- The Munsters Today (1993–95)
- My World and Welcome to It (1992–94)
- The Mystery Science Theater Hour (1995–96)
- Night Stand with Dick Dietrick (1995–97)
- Northern Exposure (1995–96)
- Pursuit of Happiness (1991–92)
- Roll Out (1991)
- Susie (1991–92)
- Super Dave (1994–95)
- The Simpsons (1997–2001)
- Throb (1992–93)
- Unhappily Ever After (1999–2000)
- Working Girl (1991–92)

=== Reality/other ===
- Access Hollywood (1996–99)
- America's Country Connection (1993–94)
- America's Dumbest Criminals (1996–98)
- America's Most Wanted (1992–95)
- The American Athlete (1998–2003)
- American Gladiators (1995–96; 2003–04)
- Blind Date (1999–2006)
- Club Golf (1992–95)
- COPS (1996–2002)
- Court TV: Inside America's Courts (1996–97)
- Crossing Over with John Edward (2001–04)
- A Current Affair (1996)
- A Current Affair Extra (1995–96)
- Divorce Court (1994–95; 1999–2002; 2005–06)
- Emergency Call (1993–96)
- Entertainers (1994–96)
- The Extremists (1997)
- Fox Report (1999–2006)
- The Gayle King Show (1997–98)
- Global Wrestling Federation (1991–93)
- Golf Magazine TV (1999–2001)
- The Gordon Elliott Show (1996–97)
- Home Team (1997)
- Home Videos of the Stars (1993–94)
- House Calls (2000–01; 2005)
- Infatuation (1992–94)
- Jane Goodall and the World of Animal Behavior (1992)
- JBTV (1992–94)
- The Jerry Springer Show (1999–2006)
- Judge Joe Brown (1998–2002)
- Judge Judy (1996–2002)
- The Keenen Ivory Wayans Show (1997–98)
- LAPD: Life on the Beat (2001–05)
- Lauren Hutton and... (1995–96)
- Lifestyles of the Rich and Famous (1993–95)
- Love Connection (1994)
- Lover or Loser (2000)
- The Magic Hour (1998)
- The Mark Walberg Show (1995–96)
- Martha Stewart Living (1997–2001)
- Match Game (1998–99)
- Maury (1998–2006)
- Motown Live (1999–2000)
- Mounties: True Stories of the Royal Canadian Mounted Police (1998–2000)
- Pictionary (1997–98)
- Planet X Television (1997–98)
- Power of Attorney (2000–04)
- Prime Suspect (1993–94)
- Raceline (2003–06)
- Real Stories of the Highway Patrol (1993–98)
- Runaway with the Rich and Famous (1993–94)
- Sally (1999–2002)
- Sex Wars (2002–03)
- Shirley (1994–95)
- Siskel & Ebert & the Movies/At the Movies with Ebert and Roeper (1997–2003)
- Sports Waves (1994–95)
- The Spud Goodman Show (1996–98)
- Starting Over (2005–06)
- Strange Universe (1996–98)
- Talk About Money (1993–95)
- Top Cops (1994–96)
- Uptown Comedy Club (1992–94)
- U.S. Customs: Classified (1995–96)
- WCW Main Event (1994)
- WCW Pro (1991–94)
- WCW WorldWide (1993)
- The Whoopi Goldberg Show (1993)
- WWF Jakked (1999–2000)
- WWF Metal (1999–2002)
- Your Big Break (1999–2001)

=== Children's programming ===
- Adventures of Sonic the Hedgehog (1993–95)
- All Dogs Go to Heaven: The Series (1996–98)
- All New Captain Kangaroo (1997–98)
- Amazin' Adventures (1992–97)
- Animal Kingdom (1998–99)
- Animal Rescue (1998–2005)
- The Baby Huey Show (1994–96)
- BattleTech (1994–95)
- Biker Mice from Mars (1993–96)
- Captain N & The Video Game Masters (1992–93)
- Cool McCool (1992–93)
- Conan the Adventurer (1993–94)
- Creepy Crawlers (1994–96)
- Crusader Rabbit (1991–92)
- Disney's Doug (1998–99)
- Dragon Ball (1995–96)
- Dragon Ball Z (1997–98)
- Fantastic Four (1994–96)
- Flash Gordon (1996–97)
- Gadget Boy & Heather (1997)
- Hercules: The Animated Series (1998–99)
- Highlander: The Animated Series (1995–96)
- Iron Man (1994–96)
- Mighty Max (1993–96)
- Mutant League (1994–96)
- Phantom 2040 (1995–96)
- The Pink Panther (1993–94)
- Popeye (1992–93)
- Popular Mechanics for Kids (1997–99)
- Real Life 101 (2003–06)
- Reality Check (1995–96)
- Saban's Adventures of Oliver Twist (1997–98)
- Sailor Moon (1995–96)
- Saved by the Bell (1991–2000)
- Scramble (1993–94)
- Student Bodies (1997–99)
- Stunt Dawgs (1992–94)
- Sweet Valley High (1994–97)
- Tenko and the Guardians of the Magic (1995–96)
- Transformers: Generation 2 (1994–95)
- The Tribe (2005–06)
- Ultimate Choice (2003–06)
- VR Troopers (1994–96)
- Wild, Wild Web (1998–99)
- What's Up Network (1993–95)
- WMAC Masters (1995–96)

== See also ==
- WGN America – a cable channel that originally operated as a superstation feed of WGN-TV, which broadcast programming from The WB Television Network for markets without an affiliate from January 1995 to October 1999
- The WB 100+ Station Group – a similar cable-only network for markets without an affiliate of The WB, that operated from September 1998 to September 2006
- The CW Plus – a successor of The WB 100+; most of the remaining cable-only channels and some over-the-air stations that are outlets of The CW Plus formerly served as affiliates of The WB 100+ Station Group
- Univision – American Spanish-language network that offers a national cable/satellite feed for markets without a local affiliate
- UniMás – American Spanish-language network that offers a national cable/satellite feed for markets without a local affiliate
- Telemundo – American Spanish-language network that offers a national cable/satellite feed for markets without a local affiliate
- Azteca América – American Spanish-language network that formerly offered a national cable/satellite feed for markets without a local affiliate
- Estrella TV – American Spanish-language network that offers a national cable/satellite feed for markets without a local affiliate
- CTV 2 Alberta – a similar cable-only affiliate of CTV 2 in the Canadian province of Alberta (formerly known as Access)
- CTV 2 Atlantic – a similar cable-only affiliate of CTV 2 in Atlantic Canada (formerly known as the Atlantic Satellite Network and A Atlantic)
- Citytv Saskatchewan – a similar cable-only affiliate of Citytv in the Canadian province of Saskatchewan (formerly known as the Saskatchewan Communications Network)
