= Emergency Call =

Emergency Call may refer to:

== Film ==
- Emergency Call (1933 film), a 1933 American film
- Emergency Call (1952 film), a 1952 British film
- Emergency (1962 film), a 1962 British film based on the 1952 British film

== Television ==
- Emergency Call (1991 TV series), a 1991 American television series in broadcast syndication; alternately known as Emergency with Alex Paen
- Emergency Call (Australian TV series), a 2018 Australian broadcast network television series
- Emergency Call (2020 TV series), a 2020 American broadcast network television series

== Video games ==
- Emergency Call Ambulance, a 1999 Sega arcade game
- Emergency Call 112: The Fire Fighting Simulation, a 2016 simulation game made by Crenetic GmbH Studios

== Other uses ==
- Emergency telephone number, which is needed to make an emergency call
