= KZJO =

Television station in Seattle

- Seattle–Tacoma, Washington; United States
- City: Seattle, Washington
- Channels: Digital: 36 (UHF); Virtual: 22
- Branding: Fox 13 Plus

Programming
- Affiliations: 22.1: Independent with MyNetworkTV; 22.2: Fox; for others, see § Subchannels

Ownership
- Owner: Fox Television Stations, LLC
- Sister stations: KCPQ

History
- First air date: June 22, 1985
- Former call signs: KTZZ-TV (1985–1999); KTWB-TV (1999–2006); KMYQ (2006–2010)
- Former channel numbers: Analog: 22 (UHF, 1985–2009); Digital: 25 (UHF, until 2019)
- Former affiliations: Independent (1985–1995); The WB (1995–2006)
- Call sign meaning: Station branded as JoeTV from 2010 through 2022

Technical information
- Licensing authority: FCC
- Facility ID: 69571
- ERP: 1,000 kW
- HAAT: 287 m (942 ft)
- Transmitter coordinates: 47°36′56.3″N 122°18′30.4″W
- Translator(s): see § Translators

Links
- Public license information: Public file; LMS
- Website: www.fox13seattle.com

KZJO (channel 22), branded as Fox 13 Plus, is a television station in Seattle, Washington, United States. It is programmed primarily as an independent station, but maintains a secondary affiliation with MyNetworkTV. KZJO is owned by Fox Television Stations alongside KCPQ (channel 13) and the two stations share studios on 9th Avenue in the Denny Triangle section of downtown Seattle; KZJO's transmitter is located near the city's Capitol Hill area.

Channel 22 began broadcasting as KTZZ-TV in 1985. It was the third independent station in the Seattle market and the first commercial ultra high frequency (UHF) station. It struggled to gain ratings attention competing against Seattle's established independents, KSTW and KCPQ. US-TV, a company owned by the Dudley family, acquired the station in two parts between 1987 and 1990; debts incurred under its original ownership prompted a bankruptcy in the early 1990s. In its early years, the station offered a range of local programs, including newscasts and sports telecasts produced by KIRO-TV; the eclectic talk show The Spud Goodman Show; and classic reruns and children's shows.

KTZZ-TV became Seattle's affiliate of The WB in 1995. When the Dudleys sought to exit broadcasting, they entered into a three-way deal that saw the stations transferred to Tribune Broadcasting. Shortly after, Tribune acquired KCPQ and had to place channel 22 in a divestiture trust before being able to form a duopoly in 1999. During that time, the station improved its technical facilities and relaunched as KTWB-TV. When The WB and UPN merged in 2006, the station was passed over for affiliation with The CW and signed up with MyNetworkTV, being renamed KMYQ. It debuted a 9 p.m. newscast from KCPQ in 2008. In 2010, the station changed its call sign to KZJO and rebranded as JoeTV, a name it used until 2022. Tribune was purchased by Nexstar Media Group in 2019; Nexstar then traded KCPQ and KZJO to Fox as part of an exchange of Fox affiliates in three cities. The station was the primary local broadcast home of Seattle Storm women's basketball from 2016 through 2024.

== History ==
In 1966, King's Garden, operator of religious AM and FM radio stations in Edmonds, applied for ultra high frequency (UHF) channel 22. The Federal Communications Commission (FCC) granted the construction permit, but King's Garden never built the station. By 1973, Maharishi International University applied for channel 22 and six other UHF stations across the United States, proposing educational and commercial programming.

=== Construction and early years ===
In 1981, the FCC designated three applications for channel 22 for comparative hearing, from Trinity Broadcasting of Seattle; Seattle STV; and Tavitac Corporation. The Tavitac application had been made in 1977. Trinity Broadcasting dropped out, and the other two applicants merged their bids into Seattle Broadcasting Corporation and won the construction permit in 1982. By late 1984, work was beginning on the station, which had taken the call sign KTZZ-TV. Dean Woodring, a general manager of TV stations in Spokane and Portland, Oregon, was named to the post for KTZZ and a station under construction in Portland.

KTZZ-TV began broadcasting on June 22, 1985. Broadcasting from studios at 945 Dexter Avenue North and a tower on Capitol Hill, it was Seattle's first full service UHF television station; at the time, the only such stations in the area were Christian outlet KTBW-TV (channel 20) and non-commercial KTPS-TV (channel 28), both in Tacoma. Its programming largely consisted of classic TV shows and children's programming, in contrast to existing independents KSTW and KCPQ, which emphasized movies. The station was bypassed in favor of KCPQ by the new Fox when it started later that year. The lineup was bolstered in 1986 when KIRO-TV (channel 7) struck a deal with the Seattle SuperSonics basketball team; KIRO produced 30 games, of which 15 aired on KTZZ. This was followed by a similar deal for Seattle Mariners baseball games in 1987. In both deals, KIRO sold most of the advertising with KTZZ getting selected advertising slots. KIRO dropped its Mariners agreement after 1988 due to the team's poor ratings performance.

Financially, channel 22's early history was rough. As the first major UHF station in town, many viewers thought they could not receive it even when it was available to them on cable. The station was the third-rated of Seattle's three independents in the first year after it signed on; though it came much closer to KSTW in the ratings for its children's programming, its first foray into local program production, the dance show Seattle Bandstand, lost its sponsors due to low ratings and left the air. In September 1986, several employees were laid off to control costs. In 1987, 40 percent of the station was sold to US-TV Network, a New York City firm run by ad sales representative Robert Dudley and financially backed by Australian broadcaster and businessman Kevin Parry. Despite the infusion of cash, the station continued to pare its payroll with more firings in late 1987 and early 1988. The Dudleys acquired the remainder of KTZZ in 1990 from Alden Television; it was their second television property after WXMI in Grand Rapids, Michigan.

On September 23, 1991, KTZZ began airing a 10 p.m. local newscast produced by KIRO-TV. The program was originally hosted by KIRO's evening news team of Aaron Brown, Harry Wappler, and Wayne Cody and provided competition for KSTW's 10 p.m. news. Later, KIRO anchors Gary Justice and Susan Hutchison became anchors at 10 on top of their existing assignments. This caused strife at KIRO and led to KIRO's union, AFTRA, suing the station in June 1992 for unfair labor practices; an administrative law judge sided with Justice and Hutchison, stating that the additional newscast took away from preparation for the 5 and 11 p.m. reports and that there was no full-time producer dedicated to the KTZZ broadcast, further increasing the workload of existing KIRO employees. By that time, officials at both stations were discussing ending the newscast. Among all programs airing at 10 p.m. locally, the KTZZ news placed seventh. In spite of this, KIRO expanded its presence on channel 22 in April 1993 when the station began simulcasting two hours of KIRO radio's morning newscast. The partnership ended shortly thereafter, and on September 17, 1993, the 10 p.m. newscast for KTZZ was ended.

KTZZ gained a reputation as a home for prime-time tabloid talk shows as well as some eclectic local programming. In 1992, The Spud Goodman Show debuted on channel 22. Spud Goodman formed part of a block of local shows aired between midnight and 2 a.m., including three music programs: Music Inner City, Rock Northwest, and Bohemia After Dark. All four programs were to be removed from the channel 22 schedule in September 1994, but Spud Goodman lasted on the lineup into 1995. During this time, KTZZ spent two years in bankruptcy reorganization. Three creditors—television program distributors MCA Television, MTM Distribution, and DLT Entertainment—forced the station into involuntary Chapter 11 bankruptcy in mid-1992. The debts were inherited by the Dudleys from the original ownership and had been accrued during the 1980s, when prices for syndicated programs were more expensive.

=== WB affiliation ===
On January 11, 1995, KTZZ affiliated with the newly-formed WB Television Network, signing an agreement just a week before the new network launched. The WB had initially signed KSTW in 1993 as its Seattle affiliate; that station's owner, Gaylord Broadcasting, backed out of the deal a year later to affiliate with CBS, while UPN signed up KIRO, which had been the CBS affiliate.

The Dudleys put their two television stations on the market in 1996, citing industry consolidation. KTZZ and WXMI were sold to Emmis Communications in 1998; the two stations were then promptly dealt to Tribune Broadcasting in exchange for WQCD, an FM radio station in New York City. Eleven weeks after the sale to Tribune closed, the company agreed to purchase KCPQ, the market's Fox affiliate. At the time, one company could only own one TV station in a market. As a result, KTZZ went on the market, and in December, Tribune applied to the FCC to place the station into a disposition trust headed by John Dudley.

Nonetheless, channel 22 forged ahead with plans formulated by Tribune to relaunch the station with new call letters and as a higher-profile WB affiliate in 1999. On April 26, 1999, KTZZ-TV became KTWB-TV, broadcasting from a new transmitter and antenna. The original facility had signal deficiencies in some areas, including in parts of Seattle.

Tribune originally needed to find a buyer for KTWB by September 1, 1999. The search became a moot point in August, when the FCC voted to legalize television duopolies. Deals creating duopolies were permitted beginning in November, at which time Tribune filed to purchase KTWB outright and own it alongside KCPQ. Its operations moved in with KCPQ; Tribune created 50 positions to match the 50 jobs that channel 22 had as an independent business, but not all of them matched the skill set of KTWB's employees, some of whom Tribune offered to transfer elsewhere in the company. The station began airing newscasts from KCPQ preempted by Fox network sports programming and sharing some of KCPQ's syndicated program inventory. In 2005, the KCPQ–KTWB facility began handling master control operations for KWBP-TV in Portland, which Tribune acquired from ACME Communications; the general manager of the Seattle stations also assumed responsibility for KWBP.

=== MyNetworkTV and Joe TV ===
On January 24, 2006, CBS Corporation and the Warner Bros. unit of Time Warner announced that the two companies would respectively shut down UPN and The WB and combine the networks' respective programming to create a new "fifth" network called The CW; the day of the announcement, it was revealed that 13 of Tribune's 16 WB affiliates would become CW stations. The merger of networks left out Tribune-owned WB stations in three markets, including KTWB in Seattle, where The CW affiliated with a CBS-owned station. These three stations—WPHL-TV in Philadelphia, WATL in Atlanta, and KTWB—signed affiliation agreements in May with MyNetworkTV, set up by Fox Television Stations to serve its own ex-UPN outlets and other displaced stations. The station changed its call sign to KMYQ and branded as "MyQ²", a brand extension of KCPQ.

At a time when the company was relaunching several of its secondary stations with new branding, Tribune rebranded KMYQ as "JoeTV" on September 13, 2010, and changed its call sign to KZJO. The station was positioned to be grittier and appeal to a younger male audience with its mix of syndicated shows. MyNetworkTV programming was deemphasized; for several years, the station website's 'about us' copy erroneously said that the MyNetworkTV affiliation ended with the JoeTV relaunch.

=== Sinclair sale attempt; acquisition by Nexstar and Fox ===
Tribune Media agreed to be sold to Sinclair Broadcast Group on May 8, 2017, for $3.9 billion and the assumption of $2.9 billion in debt held by Tribune. As Sinclair already owned KOMO-TV and KUNS-TV, KCPQ was among 23 stations identified for divestment in order to meet regulatory compliance for the merger. Sinclair agreed to purchase KZJO and sell KCPQ to Fox Television Stations as part of a $910 million deal; Howard Stirk Holdings additionally agreed to purchase KUNS-TV. Lead FCC commissioner Ajit Pai publicly rejected the deal in July 2018 after details of Sinclair's proposed divestitures came to light; weeks later, Tribune terminated the merger agreement with Sinclair, nullifying both transactions.

Tribune Media agreed to be acquired by Nexstar Media Group for $6.9 billion in cash and debt on December 3, 2018. Following the merger's completion on September 19, 2019, Fox Television Stations purchased KCPQ and KZJO as part of a $350 million deal, with Fox citing KCPQ's status as the broadcaster of most Seahawks home games as the impetus for the transaction. The sale was completed on March 2, 2020. After its acquisition by Fox, KZJO dropped the Joe TV moniker and rebranded to "Fox 13+" on September 26, 2021, conforming with the branding of other Fox-owned stations.

== Local programming ==
=== Newscasts ===
On March 31, 2008, KMYQ began airing a KCPQ-produced 9 p.m. newscast airing Monday through Sunday. The station also exclusively airs KCPQ's weekend editions of Good Day Seattle, its morning newscast.

=== Sports programming ===
In 2014, the station began to air Major League Soccer matches featuring Seattle Sounders FC alongside KCPQ. The station also aired pre-match and post-match coverage for the team through the end of the 2022 season. (Note: All Major League Soccer local television rights agreements ended after 2022 to make way for MLS's 10-year deal with Apple.)

In 2016, KCPQ and KZJO began broadcasting locally televised games of the Seattle Storm of the WNBA; initially starting with 15 home games on channel 22 in 2016, KZJO was slated to carry 29 games in the 2023 season with six more on KCPQ. In 2024, it was scheduled to air 23 games with KCPQ airing another seven. KOMO-TV and KUNS became the rightsholders for the 2025 season. In November 2025, it was announced that the Seattle Torrent of the Professional Women's Hockey League (PWHL) would air the majority of its games on KZJO for its inaugural season, with an additional six on KONG.

Other local sports are aired in limited quantities on KZJO. It is the Seattle affiliate for Gonzaga men's basketball games and The Mark Few Show, produced by KHQ-TV in Spokane. In the 2022 and 2023 season, the station aired telecasts of OL Reign women's soccer; it was supplanted in this role by KONG (channel 16) for 2024. In 2023, the station agreed to air ten Seattle Thunderbirds junior hockey games. As of 2025, KZJO also airs games from the Seattle Seawolves of Major League Rugby. The station also agreed to carry the entire schedule of the Washington Wolfpack of Arena Football One for 2026.

== Technical information ==
=== Subchannels ===
KZJO's transmitter is located near the Capitol Hill section of Seattle. The station's signal is multiplexed:

Subchannels of KZJO
| Subchannel | Res. | Short name | Programming |
|---|---|---|---|
| 22.1 | 720p | FOX13+ | MyNetworkTV |
| 22.2 | 720p | FOX13 | Fox (KCPQ) |
| 22.3 | 480i | AntTV | Antenna TV → TBA (soon) |
| 22.5 | 480i | NOSEY | Nosey |
| 16.2 | 480i | TCN | True Crime Network → Antenna TV (soon) (KONG) |

Simulcast of subchannels of another station
Broadcast on behalf of another station

=== Analog-to-digital conversion ===
KMYQ shut down its analog signal, over UHF channel 22, on June 12, 2009, as part of the mandatory federally mandated transition from analog to digital television. The station's digital signal remained on its pre-transition UHF channel 25, using virtual channel 22. KZJO relocated its signal from channel 25 to channel 36 on January 17, 2020, as a result of the 2016 United States wireless spectrum auction.

=== Translators ===
The station is broadcast on two translators:

- Centralia/Chehalis: K15MI-D
- Everett: K29ED-D

Grade A signal contours for KZJO and associated translators.; KZJO; Low-power translators
