= KFXB-TV =

Television station in Dubuque, Iowa

- Dubuque–Cedar Rapids–; Waterloo–Iowa City, Iowa; United States
- City: Dubuque, Iowa
- Channels: Digital: 14 (UHF); Virtual: 40
- Branding: CTN Eastern Iowa

Programming
- Affiliations: 40.1: CTN; for others, see § Subchannels

Ownership
- Owner: Christian Television Network; (Christian Television Network of Iowa, Inc.)

History
- First air date: June 1, 1970
- Former call signs: KDUB-TV (1970–1995)
- Former channel numbers: Analog: 40 (UHF, 1970–2009); Digital: 43 (UHF, until 2018)
- Former affiliations: ABC (1970–1974, 1976–1995); Dark (1974–1976); Fox (1995–2004)
- Call sign meaning: Disambiguation of former sister station KFXA

Technical information
- Licensing authority: FCC
- Facility ID: 17625
- ERP: 580 kW
- HAAT: 261 m (856 ft)
- Transmitter coordinates: 42°31′9″N 90°37′11″W

Links
- Public license information: Public file; LMS
- Website: ctnonline.com/affiliate-stations/ctn-eastern-iowa-kfxb/

KFXB-TV (channel 40) is a religious television station licensed to Dubuque, Iowa, United States, serving the Eastern Iowa television market. The station is owned by the Christian Television Network (CTN). KFXB-TV's studios are located on Main Street in downtown Dubuque, and its transmitter is located in extreme southwestern Grant County, Wisconsin (in the Madison television market).

== History ==
The station signed on as KDUB-TV on June 1, 1970, on channel 40 as an ABC affiliate. Original owner Dubuque Communications Corporation, owned by Gerald J. Green, his brother Timothy, and their wives, had been established in May 1968, even after Green had been advised that Dubuque was too small to support a television station; the station was initially unable to obtain an affiliation with any of the three television networks before ABC finally agreed to affiliate with KDUB-TV. In 1972, Gerald Green, who also served as station president and general manager, was embroiled in a controversy with the Federal Communications Commission (FCC) over whether $19,000 he paid to an ABC network representative was a bribe. Green testified that he thought the money was a legitimate expense in obtaining the network affiliation. Green was later exonerated, but the ABC executive was found guilty of extorting payoffs.

After encountering financial difficulties, KDUB-TV ceased operations at 11:06 p.m. on September 30, 1974, after that night's Monday Night Football telecast; the shutdown was announced to viewers during halftime by news director Jim Esmoil, who said that the station would be leaving the air instead of producing a newscast that night. Much of KDUB-TV's equipment was repossessed by the station's largest creditor, RCA. The closure came after Green spent two years trying to sell the station, including unsuccessful negotiations with the Moline Television Corporation, owner of Quad Cities station WQAD-TV.

In 1976, Dubuque Communications Corporation, which had become insolvent, sold the dormant station for $30,000 to Lloyd Hearing Aid Corp of Rockford, Illinois. The new owners returned KDUB-TV to the air on September 12, 1976, again as an ABC affiliate. Lloyd Hearing Aid Corp. would sell the station to the Commercial Dispatch Publishing Company in 1979; the $1.5 million sale to Birney Imes Jr. and his family added KDUB-TV to a broadcast group that included WCBI-TV in Columbus, Mississippi, WBOY-TV in Clarksburg, West Virginia, and several Mississippi radio stations. Dubuque TV Limited Partnership, led by general partner Thomas Bond, acquired the station in April 1985; Bond, whose group paid $3.25 million for KDUB-TV, had been a manager at WCBI-TV.

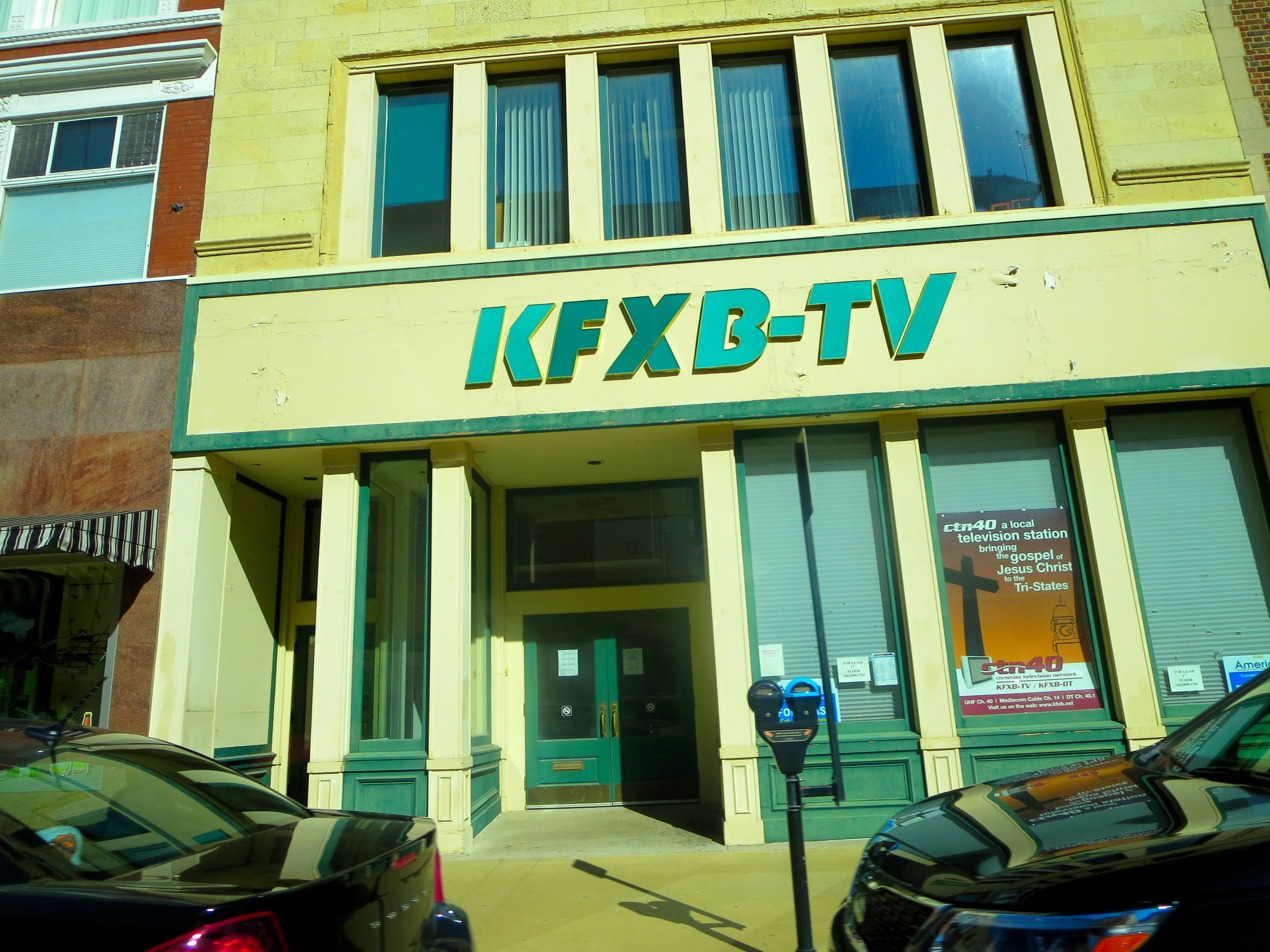
KFXB-TV's former studios in downtown Dubuque

The first and only television station to be based out of Dubuque, KDUB was originally based in an office building just south of Dubuque, near Key West, Iowa. The station eventually moved into offices on the ninth floor of the former Roshek's Department Store building in downtown Dubuque, and later moved to its current location on Main Street.

For a number of years, KDUB and KCRG-TV (channel 9), the ABC affiliate in Cedar Rapids, were in conflict with each other. In 1981, KDUB won a decision in which the Dubuque cable company was required to black out KCRG when the same shows were shown at the same time on both stations. In August 1987, KDUB's owners turned down a $2.4 million offer to sell channel 40 to KCRG; that December, Bond announced that KDUB would be sold to Sage Broadcasting, a Stamford, Connecticut–based radio station group, for $4 million. The sale was challenged by KCRG in January 1988, claiming that KDUB had conspired with TCI Cablevision by using the blackouts to limit KCRG's ability to reach Dubuque viewers. While the sale would receive FCC approval in early 1989, a clause in the deal allowed for it to be canceled if it was not approved within 180 days; Sage would walk away from the deal in late 1988, and Bond announced on March 17, 1989, that KDUB would not be sold. In April 1990, KDUB's owners sued KCRG, claiming its objections led to the sale falling through. TCI would ultimately stop blacking out KCRG on April 1, 1988.

In 1995, KDUB entered into a management agreement with Second Generation of Iowa, which was in the process of acquiring Cedar Rapids Fox affiliate KOCR-TV (channel 28). On August 13, KDUB discontinued the ABC affiliation and joined Fox as KFXB, a semi-satellite of channel 28 (which concurrently relaunched as KFXA). Most programming was simulcast from KFXA, but KFXB would continue its news operation (at that time, KFXA had no newscast at all). Prior to this, KOCR served as the network's over-the air affiliate for most of the southern portion of the market while Foxnet (which had launched in 1991) served as the network's cable-only affiliate for the remainder of the market, including the cities of Waterloo and Dubuque (it was carried on cable channel 13 in Dubuque); between October 7, 1994, and August 12, 1995, Foxnet was carried on all cable systems in most of Eastern Iowa as KOCR was off the air during that time due to financial issues. The first season of the NFL on Fox was carried by Cedar Rapids CBS affiliate KGAN, which had a greater coverage area than KOCR; Foxnet was blacked out during the games.

On October 14, 2002, KFXB announced that the Dubuque news operation would be closed after October 25; the cancellation of the local Dubuque newscasts at 5 and 10 p.m. was a byproduct of an agreement between KFXA and KGAN to launch a regional 9 p.m. newscast to air on both KFXA and KFXB. KFXB's eight news staffers were laid off in the transition, with its former reporters telling the Telegraph Herald that the first indication of the planned change was a promo aired during Fox's baseball coverage.

In September 2004, Dubuque TV Limited Partnership sold the station to the Christian Television Network, who switched the station to its primarily-religious programming; general partner Tom Bond, who would stay with the relaunched KFXB as general manager, said that he felt that Christian programming was "the niche that the station could best fill in this market". Fox programming would continue to be transmitted on KFXA—which would operate as the sole Fox affiliate for northeast Iowa. At that time, KFXB lost its longstanding channel 4 assignment on Mediacom's Dubuque cable system to KFXA, with KFXB being moved to channel 14. Mediacom would add KFXB to its Cedar Rapids and Iowa City systems in 2005.

KFXB has been digital-only since February 17, 2009.

== Subchannels ==
The station's signal is multiplexed:

Subchannels of KFXB-TV
Subchannel	Res.	Short name	Programming
40.1	1080i	KFXB	CTN
40.2	480i	N2	Newsmax2 (4:3)
40.3	480i	CTNi	CTN International (4:3)
40.4	480i	BUZZR	Buzzr (4:3)
40.5	480i	BIZ-TV	Biz TV (4:3)
