= The Spud Goodman Show =

Radio show and television series

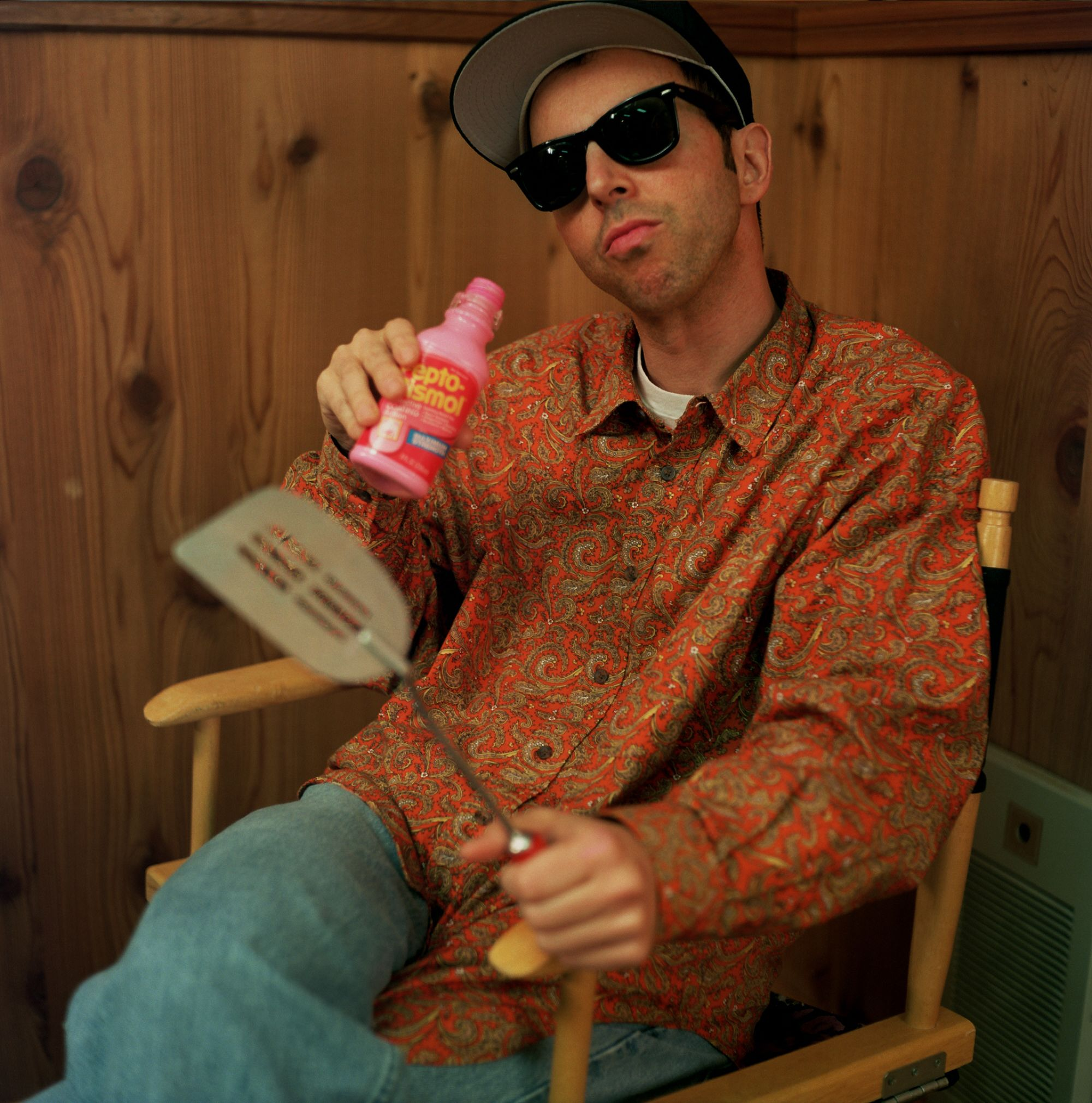
Promotional photo of Spud Goodman from the 1990s.

The Spud Goodman Show is a radio program heard on several terrestrial radio and internet radio stations in North America and Europe. It began as a cable TV talk show in the Puget Sound area in the state of Washington, USA, and later transitioned to broadcast television. The show usually features eccentric celebrities, scripted pseudo-celebrities and live music. The show was originally hosted by Spud Goodman and his co-host, Chick Hunter.

== History ==
The Spud Goodman Show was a counter-culture talk and music program which was prominent in the Puget Sound area from the mid-1980s to the late 1990s. The program debuted on local origination cable TV channels in the Tacoma market in February 1985. The pilot program was titled Can We Talk?? but the title was changed to incorporate the host's name not long after regular broadcasts began. The producers purchased time on local cable outlets and commercial time was sold within the program. Later, radio versions were made of these programs in the Seattle-Tacoma area.

Purporting to originate from Goodman's apartment, the original set was an ad-hoc studio built in the basement of an abandoned Eagles Club in downtown Tacoma. After several years at this location, the program moved to the public-access television facilities of TCI Cablevision in Seattle, where it was broadcast live. After one season on Public-access television, the show moved to TCI's commercial "local origination" channel which allowed sponsor tie-ins and other production synergies. Featuring genuine celebrities in addition to scripted ones, live music, a live audience and call-ins from viewers, the show became a genuine weekly event in the Seattle television market and frequently played to a standing-room-only house.

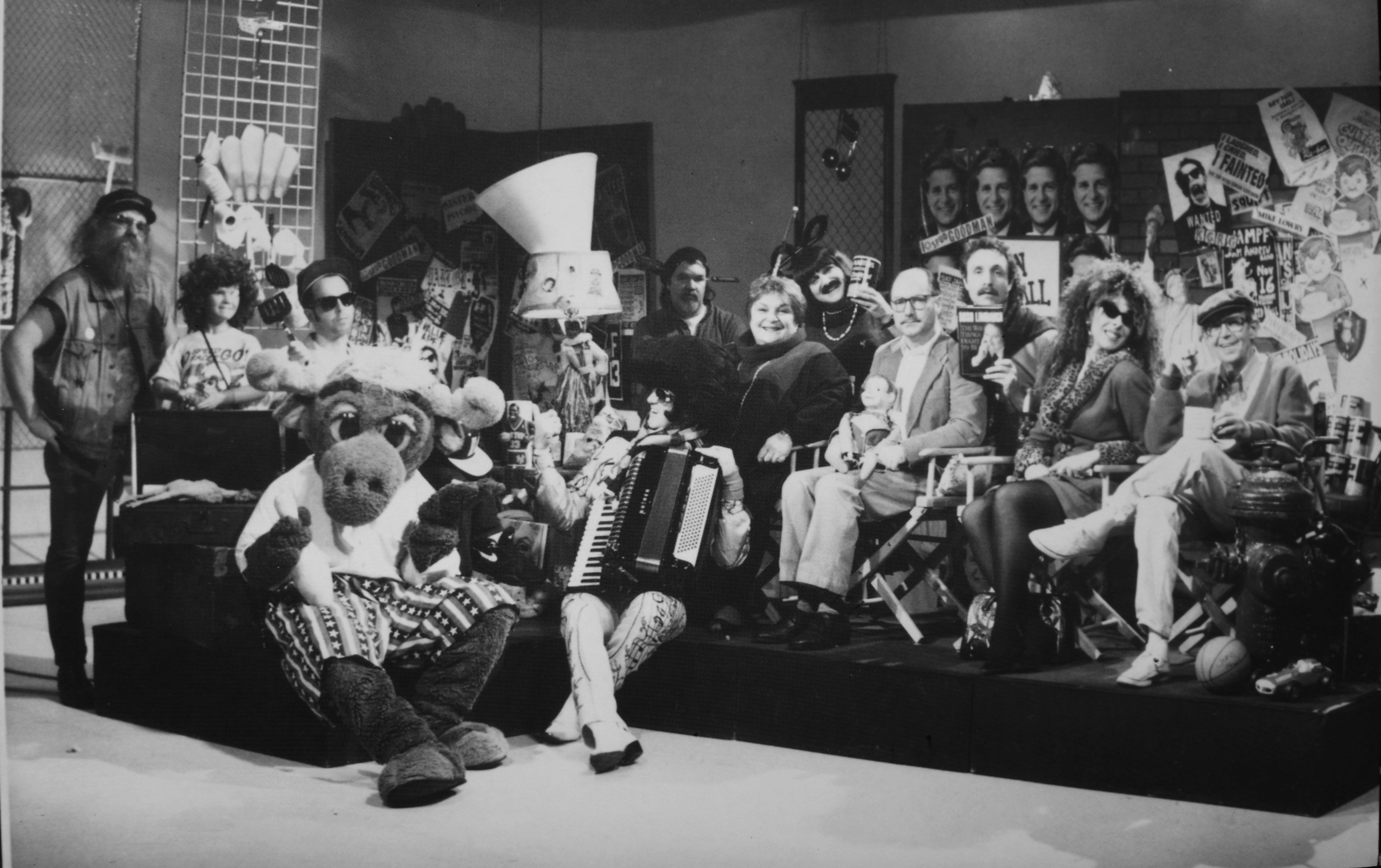
Bodyguard Irish, a mannequin, Spud Goodman, the Mariner Moose, Accordion Joe, human prop Dick, Spud's mom Saffola, Spud's cousin Samuel, Spud's Uncle Steve (and Jerry), Jeff Larson, Spud's sister Sophia, Spud's dad Sparky.

Although the program was the highest-rated locally produced cable show in the Seattle market, its popularity also made it a target of some Public-access television advocates who saw its popularity as unfair to their own programs. Rather than accept an unfavorable time slot for the sake of such fairness the program left the air at the height of its popularity. The show made the transition from Public-access television to broadcast television in 1992 when it began a three-year run at KTZZ-TV (later KTWB, then KMYQ, now KZJO) in Seattle.

Since KTZZ operated on a limited budget, the program was heavily dependent on volunteer staff working in all aspects of production. By the mid-1990s, however, the viability for locally produced variety programs diminished, and after a three-year run the management of KTZZ reluctantly cancelled the show.

The show was to have one more television run, but not as a local production. The Fox TV network had introduced its "Foxnet" cable network as a means to get its prime time programming into markets that did not have Fox stations available over-the-air. Produced on a practically non-existent budget out of rooms rented from a local service club with declining membership, the program enjoyed another three years on Foxnet from 1995 to 1998, a quirky counterpoint to the network's slicker Hollywood offerings.

== Show format ==
The show was hosted by Spud Goodman; a hip, cynical and occasionally mean-spirited underachiever. Goodman was joined by his co-host and boyhood friend Chick Hunter, who was credulous, sincere and naive. The differing world outlooks of the two men made for good character interplay as well as entertainingly disjointed interviews of the program's guests. The show's guests usually fell into one of two categories: eccentric celebrities or scripted pseudo-celebrities, and it was sometimes difficult to tell which type of guest was being interviewed, which added to the show's "edgy" character. In an effort to maintain control of frequently anarchic program, Goodman often admonished Hunter to "know your role" and limited him to one question per guest.

During the run at TCI, the show began to acquire the repertory company that carried it through to its end. Accordion Joe, the "world's only accordion playing Elvis impersonator", served as the program's ersatz studio orchestra. Goodman and Hunter were also joined by Spud's divorced parents, Sparky and Saffola. Still contentious after their bitter divorce, they tried to pull Spud's career in different directions which they saw as advantageous to both his future and their own. Spud's cross dressing cousin, Samuel, yearned for a career as a TV weather man. After moving to broadcast, Spud's Uncle Steve joined the group. Although not a ventriloquist, he never went anywhere without his ventriloquial figure Jerry, who could channel Greg, the Ancient Inca Warrior. Spud also was forced to deal with Jeff Larson, who was at times a self-obsessed yuppie, a rabid Rush Limbaugh fan, and in a character reboot, the program's producer. By the time the program arrived on broadcast TV, it had grown even more ambitious than the live version had been on cable, and while it was pre-recorded without a studio audience, it maintained much of the "circus atmosphere" of its previous live version.

== Related programs ==
Following the live program, Spud resurfaced in Spud on Sports, in which he interviewed professional athletes and other sports boosters in a pre-recorded format. He also had a 13-week pre-recorded series called The Other Spud Goodman Show which was built around the theme of his "failure" with the live show, and his attempts to resurrect his career by establishing a cult of personality for himself.

In addition to the public access television show, Goodman and Hunter also hosted a similarly themed three-hour Sunday afternoon call-in show on Tacoma radio station KAMT, and later a half-hour pre-recorded radio program syndicated to college radio stations around the US including Tacoma's KVTI.

== Radio ==
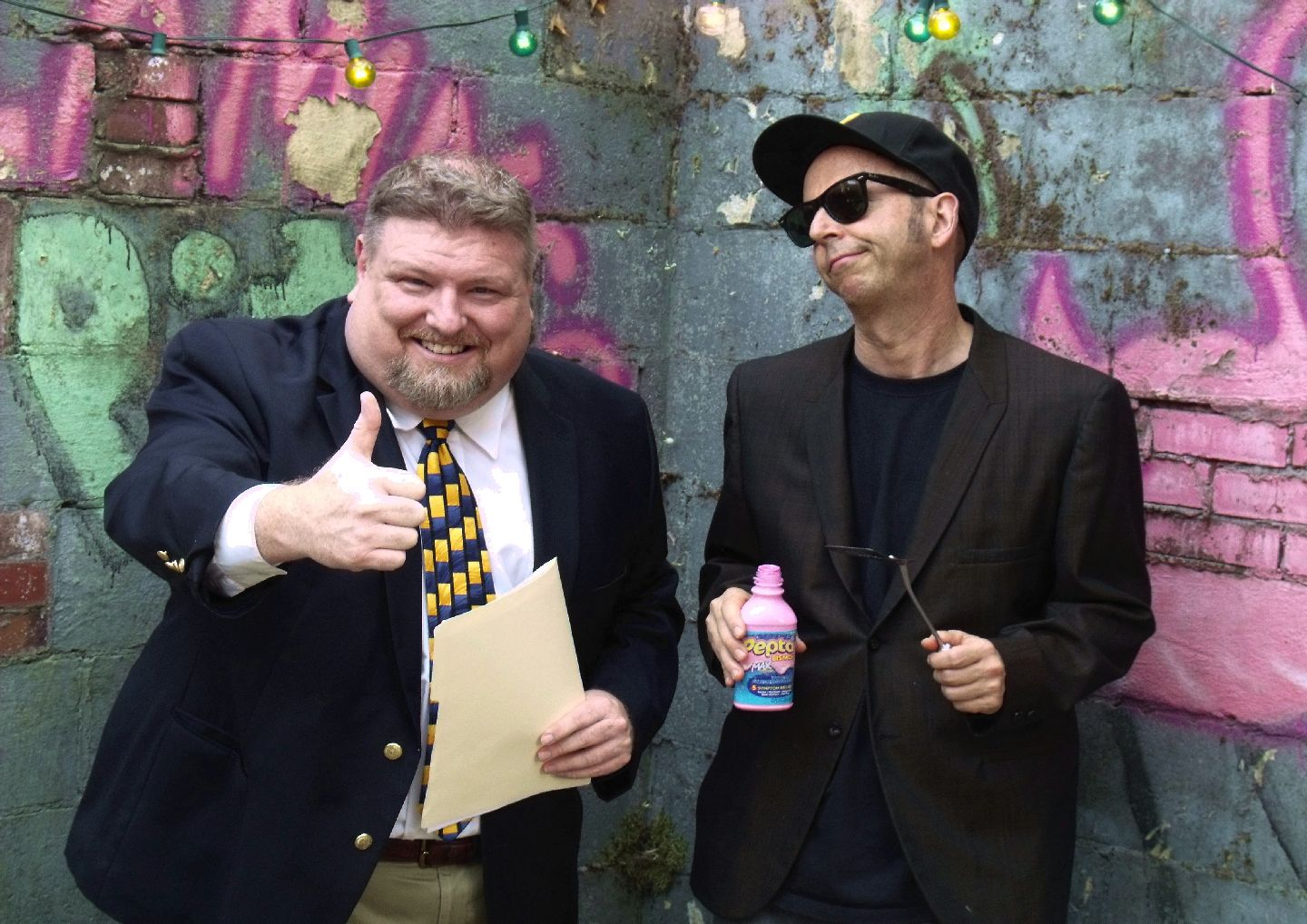
Spud Goodman (right) and Permanent Temporary Co-Host Gerald Holcomb (left) from The Spud Goodman Radio Show.

In the Summer of 2013, Goodman and Hunter revived their characters for The Spud Goodman Radio Show, a weekly hour-long live radio program originating from NWCZ Radio , which is re-broadcast on several other stations in North America and Europe. Like their live cable program on TCI, the show features live music, calls from listeners, celebrity and scripted guests, and members of Spud's family. The program is also distributed on iTunes. Since Chick Hunter's departure, the unctuous and smarmy carpet and linoleum salesman Gerald Holcomb has joined the cast as Temporary Permanent Co-Host, accompanied by Gina, Spud's Official Laugher. In many markets, Spud's show is followed by a second hour, "The Spud Goodman Post Show Report" in which host Lawrence, a convicted art forger out on parole, discusses the previous hour's highlights and plays an eclectic assortment of music.
