= KFXA =

Television station in Cedar Rapids, Iowa

- Cedar Rapids–Waterloo–; Iowa City–Dubuque, Iowa; United States
- City: Cedar Rapids, Iowa
- Channels: Digital: 27 (UHF); Virtual: 28

Programming
- Affiliations: 28.1: Roar; for others, see § Subchannels

Ownership
- Owner: Sinclair Broadcast Group; (KFXA Licensee, LLC)
- Sister stations: KGAN

History
- First air date: January 10, 1988
- Former call signs: KOCR (1988–1995)
- Former channel numbers: Analog: 28 (UHF, 1988–2009)
- Former affiliations: Fox (1988–1994, 1995–2021); Silent (1994–1995); Dabl (2021–2025; moved to 28.5)
- Call sign meaning: "Fox A" (former affiliation and KFXB-TV simulcast)

Technical information
- Licensing authority: FCC
- Facility ID: 35336
- ERP: 1,000 kW
- HAAT: 449 m (1,473 ft)
- Transmitter coordinates: 42°5′25″N 92°5′14″W

Links
- Public license information: Public file; LMS

KFXA (channel 28) is a television station licensed to Cedar Rapids, Iowa, United States, serving Eastern Iowa with programming from the digital multicast network Roar. It is owned by Sinclair Broadcast Group alongside dual CBS/Fox affiliate KGAN (channel 2). The two stations share studios at Broadcast Park on Old Marion Road Northeast (along IA 100) in Cedar Rapids; KFXA's transmitter is located in Van Horne, Iowa.

Channel 28 began broadcasting as KOCR in January 1988. The region's Fox affiliate for most of its history, the station started out on poor financial footing; its owner, Metro Program Network, was repeatedly sued for breaching various financial obligations. The station lacked the resources to build a transmitter facility adequate to broadcast beyond the Cedar Rapids and Iowa City area, which was highlighted when it allowed KGAN to broadcast the NFL on Fox in 1994 because it could not serve the entire market. In October 1994, the station's financial troubles culminated in an eviction from its studios in northeast Cedar Rapids. The station's founding owner later admitted he did not have the resources to properly run the station.

Second Generation acquired KOCR in 1995 and returned it to air that August as KFXA. Until 2004, it was paired with KFXB-TV (channel 40), a separately owned station in Dubuque, to provide regional coverage. Second Generation also built a new transmitter facility to increase KFXA's coverage area. KGAN owner Sinclair Broadcast Group assumed most of the station's operating functions in 2002 and bought its assets, other than the license, in 2008. Under Sinclair, KGAN added morning and late evening newscasts to KFXA's programming. On January 1, 2021, "Fox 28" became a subchannel of KGAN, leaving KFXA to broadcast national digital multicast television networks.

== History ==
=== KOCR: Construction and financial woes ===
In January 1983, Stanley G. Emert Jr., an attorney from Knoxville, Tennessee, applied to the Federal Communications Commission (FCC) for a new television station on ultra high frequency (UHF) channel 28 in Cedar Rapids, Iowa. A second application was filed by Metro Program Network, a company owned by Gerald Fitzgerald, on March 9. Fitzgerald was a former communications professor at the University of Northern Iowa. Both applications proposed the establishment of an independent station with movies and local programming. However, an FCC administrative law judge selected the Metro Program Network application in March 1985. By July, the company also had construction permits for stations at Ames and Dubuque.

Construction had accelerated by August 1987, when Fitzgerald announced he was negotiating to affiliate with Fox; studios on Boyson Road Northeast in Cedar Rapids were nearly complete. KOCR began broadcasting on January 10, 1988, for three hours a day. The first week contained unscheduled "previews" of the station's Fox and syndicated programming, as not all of the programs for which KOCR had paid had arrived.

However, the station was unable to remain on the air at the outset. Before broadcasting, Fitzgerald sought to modify the construction permit to again reflect a Cedar Rapids transmitter site instead of one in Garrison, where Benton County officials declined to approve the erection of a taller tower. In what Fitzgerald later called a "procedural problem", the Garrison site was still active in FCC records when the station began operating from the Cedar Rapids location. When the FCC learned KOCR was broadcasting from an unauthorized facility, and after a $150 payment check to the commission bounced—rendering the station without a license as the construction permit expired—it ordered KOCR off the air on March 25, 1988. The commission granted verbal approval on April 22 for the station to resume; the next year, the FCC levied a $20,000 fine against Metro Program Network for the construction of KOCR at the then-unauthorized location.

Within two weeks of being ordered off the air, Metro Program Network's financial problems began to become apparent. On April 8, while the station was off the air, Fitzgerald paid nearly $5,000 to settle a mechanic's lien on the property brought by a Cedar Rapids drywall firm; this nullified a public auction of the Boyson Road studio. In June, programming distributor Paramount Pictures sued Metro Program Network in federal court, alleging that the station violated copyright laws by playing series such as Happy Days and Mork and Mindy despite not paying the company. Paramount then amended its suit to seek more than $217,000 in damages. The case went to trial in November 1990; in April 1991, a federal judge ordered KOCR and Fitzgerald to pay more than $250,000 to Paramount in his ruling on the 1988 lawsuit, finding that the contract with the syndicator carried no pro rata provisions. Similar lawsuits by Orion Pictures and MTM Enterprises were settled out of court. Broadcast Music, Inc. won $60,000 after the station continued playing songs it represented without a license, while the Associated Press won a $140,000 judgment in 1992 over KOCR's failure to pay for news services it received under contract.

The decision to build a smaller tower in Cedar Rapids also had the consequence of limiting the station's over-the-air coverage outside of the Cedar Rapids and Iowa City area. This left Waterloo, located within the market, completely out of Fox broadcast coverage; the city's main cable provider TCI carried Foxnet instead of KOCR since it could not reliably receive the station's signal. KOCR leased a translator in Dubuque for four and a half months in 1991 before it was turned off because the owner was not being paid. When Fox outbid CBS for the rights to broadcast National Football League games beginning in 1994, viewers expressed concern about the lack of a local Fox signal to cable companies serving Waterloo and smaller communities in Eastern Iowa. Unable to broadcast to the entire region, KOCR permitted KGAN, the CBS affiliate based in Cedar Rapids, to negotiate with the Fox network to carry the NFL on Fox; this was intended as a stopgap measure until the station could finalize construction of a taller tower with better signal coverage (a process started in April) in time for the 1995 season.

In addition to the lawsuits in court, KOCR faced the threat of eviction beginning in 1991. Under a capital crunch in 1989, Fitzgerald sold KOCR's facilities to two landlords, Don Tauke and Joan Nickol, who then leased the property back to the station. Tauke and Nickol received court approval to evict KOCR in June 1991, having sought court action against Fitzgerald for some time prior due to lapsed payments, but reached an eleventh-hour agreement because Fitzgerald provided evidence of activity with potential buyers. Tauke and Nickol carried out an attempt to evict the station on September 7, 1994, which was stopped an hour after it began by a court order. While Linn County sheriff's deputies who had fretted about how to explain the loss of Mighty Morphin Power Rangers and Beverly Hills, 90210 to their children were relieved, station officials were forced to take equipment back inside after work crews had already removed it. Days later, electricity to the studios was cut off, though the station continued to broadcast using generators for power, annoying nearby residents. After Fitzgerald missed payments on a short-term lease that was supposed to run through June 1995, Tauke and Nickol finally lost patience with KOCR. On October 6, they won court approval for another attempt to evict the station, which sheriff's deputies carried out later that day. Cable systems in Cedar Rapids and Iowa City immediately substituted Foxnet for the lost affiliate. At the time of the eviction, the station owed more than $45,000 to IES Utilities, along with $100,000 in back rent. Tauke and Nickol then sold the land to a communications company. Fitzgerald was later accused of felony fraud for failing to pay the state of Iowa more than $4,400 in taxes. During this time, it was not even certain that channel 28 would remain a Fox affiliate if it returned; Fant Broadcasting held the construction permit for channel 48, KTVC, and openly floated that it might replace KOCR as the regional Fox affiliate.

=== Second Generation ownership and return to air as KFXA ===
In May 1995, Second Generation of Iowa, a company owned by Thomas Embrescia of Cleveland, acquired KOCR for $1.25 million. Embrescia had previously owned WUPW in Toledo, Ohio, and was also a part-owner of two Cleveland radio stations. An advance of the purchase price allowed Fitzgerald to purchase equipment needed to get the station back on the air, with the remainder of the proceeds satisfying debts. At the time, Eastern Iowa was the largest market in the country without a local Fox affiliate. Fitzgerald conceded that he had been in over his head running the station; he said he did not have the financial wherewithal "to operate the station the way it should be operated". The next month, it was announced that KDUB-TV (channel 40) in Dubuque, an ABC affiliate with local news programming for that city, would switch to Fox in partnership with channel 28, though the Dubuque station would continue to be separately owned.

On August 13, 1995, the station began broadcasting again as KFXA, with the Dubuque station becoming KFXB-TV. With channel 28 back in service, KGAN ultimately withdrew its claim to be able to broadcast NFL games in 1995. Channel 40 would continue to split from KFXA's programming to air its existing local news for the Dubuque area. Second Generation operated the station under a local marketing agreement (LMA) until January 23, 1996, when it closed on the outright acquisition of KFXA.

An immediate priority for Second Generation was improving channel 28's signal. While KFXA was carried on Waterloo cable, it too could not be seen over the air in that city. In September 1996, a new transmitter facility 6 miles (9.7 km) south of Vinton, featuring a 1,500-foot (460 m) tower and broadcasting with an effective radiated power of 5 million watts, was commissioned to provide parity with the other major network affiliates in the market. In 1999, KFXA began selling advertising for KPXR-TV (the former KTVC, built as the local outlet of Pax TV) in a joint sales agreement.

=== Sinclair takes over; newscast ===
In 2002, Sinclair and Second Generation of Iowa entered into an outsourcing agreement whereby Sinclair began providing KFXA's sales and other non-programming services. The first on-air product of this relationship debuted later that year, when KFXA began airing Fox News at Nine, a regional news program for central and eastern Iowa that KGAN had already been producing for Sinclair's KDSM-TV in Des Moines. The new Cedar Rapids-based news program marked the end of KFXB-TV's separate news operation, with its eight employees being laid off; KFXB-TV split from KFXA in 2004 when its owner, Dubuque TV Limited Partnership, sold the station to the Christian Television Network.

Separate from the evening newscast, KFXA produced and aired a two-hour morning show, Good Day Iowa, from 2005 to 2007. The program, hosted by Eadie Fawcett and Craig Johnson—both former anchors at other Eastern Iowa TV stations—failed to attract significant ratings to ensure its survival.

In 2008, Sinclair acquired KFXA's non-license assets, though Second Generation remained the nominal owner. A 7 a.m. news hour was added to KFXA in 2011.

=== Loss of Fox affiliation ===
On January 1, 2021, Sinclair quietly sent a letter to cable and satellite providers saying that it had consolidated the Fox affiliations of stations in five markets where it had been on a station operated via an LMA onto Sinclair-owned stations, putting those affiliations directly in Sinclair's control. KFXA was one of the affected stations. On that day, KFXA's Fox affiliation, "Fox 28" branding and syndicated programming moved to the second subchannel of KGAN. On-air operations mostly continued unchanged, though over-the-air viewers were asked to rescan their sets in order to continue watching Fox. On July 28, the FCC issued a forfeiture order stemming from a lawsuit against Second Generation of Iowa. The lawsuit, filed by AT&T, alleged that Second Generation failed to negotiate for retransmission consent in good faith for KFXA. Owners of other Sinclair-managed stations, such as Deerfield Media, were also named in the lawsuit. Second Generation was ordered to pay a fine of $512,228.

Second Generation of Iowa filed on May 8, 2025, to sell KFXA to Sinclair for $19 million per an asset purchase agreement agreed in 2008. KFXA did not rank in the top four stations in the market. The sale was completed on June 1, 2026.

In August 2025, the station flipped to Roar.

== Subchannels ==
KFXA's transmitter is located in Van Horne, Iowa. Its signal is multiplexed:

Subchannels of KFXA
Subchannel	Res.	Short name	Programming
28.1	480i	ROAR	Roar
28.2	480i	Charge!	Charge!
28.3	480i	Comet	Comet
28.4	480i	TheNest	The Nest
28.5	480i	Dabl	Dabl
