= Prime Suspect (American TV program) =

- The original logo/intro used for season 1
- Genre: Reality legal programming
- Presented by: Mike Hegedus
- Voices of: Mike Hegedus
- Country of origin: United States
- Original language: English
- No. of seasons: 3

Production
- Executive producer: Keith Samples
- Running time: 30 minutes
- Production companies: Byrne Enterprises Rysher Entertainment

Original release
- Network: First-run syndication
- Release: 1992 – 1995

Prime Suspect is an American television program that aired in syndication from 1992 to 1995, and was hosted by Mike Hegedus.

The show, which had a similar format to that of the unrelated America's Most Wanted, profiled cases involving the search for and apprehension of fugitives wanted for serious crimes, including murder, rape, kidnapping, child sexual abuse, white-collar crime, organized crime, robbery, gang, and terrorism.

== Cultural references ==
Prime Suspect was referenced in Season 3, Episode 14 of the podcast Undisclosed: The State vs. Dennis Perry. In the podcast, the legal team investigating a miscarriage of justice of Dennis Perry sought to find an episode of Prime Suspect that pertained to the murder of Harold and Thelma Swain, hoping it would help them uncover the timeline of false information being injected into the investigation. No tape was able to be uncovered, and they continue to seek a recording of this Prime Suspect episode.
