= Emergency Call (1991 TV series) =

Television series

- Also known as: Emergency with Alex Paen
- Genre: Docudrama
- Presented by: Joseph Campanella (1991–92); Ron Allen (1992–93); Alex Paen (1994–98)
- Country of origin: United States
- Original language: English

Production
- Producer: Alex Paen
- Running time: 30 minutes

Original release
- Network: Syndication
- Release: 1991 – 1998

Emergency Call is an American informational reality-based television series that originally aired in syndication from 1991 to 1998. After its last original episode, Telco Productions, the production company headed by series producer and host Alex Paen, continues to distribute repeats of the series, and it is currently carried by the online streaming service Nosey, which itself is distributed by Pluto TV.

== Overview ==
The series featured firefighters, police rescue teams, and other rescue personnel at work while in action and at home discussing their jobs. Actor Joseph Campanella was the program's first host, replaced in the second season by Ron Allen. In 1994, series producer Alex Paen become host. In 1996, the program was retitled Emergency with Alex Paen and the episodes that had aired with the other hosts were re-edited with Paen as the host.
