= Great Lakes Bat Festival =

Annual festival

- Genre: Festival
- Frequency: Annually in September or October
- Location: Great Lakes region
- Years active: 23–24
- Inaugurated: 2002
- Founder: Organization for Bat Conservation
- Attendance: Est. 2,000-3,000
- Executive Director: Rob Mies
- Sponsor: Critter Catchers

The Great Lakes Bat Festival was an annual two-day event that started in 2002 and began in the Great Lakes region. The festival later expanded to different state divisions, which included the Illinois Bat Festival, the Indiana State University Bat Festival, the Minnesota Bat Festival, and the Wisconsin Bat Festival. It was founded and organized by the Organization for Bat Conservation until the organization's dissolution in 2018.

The goals of the Great Lakes Bat Festival were to highlight the diversity of life on earth, and to educate people on bats and explain the need for conservation. The festival included live bat programs presented by the Organization for Bat Conservation, featuring bats from around the world.

Evening events included demonstrations from bat researchers on various research techniques, such as radio-tagging and/or light-tagging.

== Locations ==
The festival was held at the Cranbrook Institute of Science Bat Zone in Bloomfield Hills, Michigan, at the Indiana State University Center for North American Bat Research and Conservation in Terre Haute, Indiana, at the Milwaukee County Zoo in Milwaukee, Wisconsin, and at Iron Mountain, Michigan near Millie Hill Mine.

No.	Year	Venue	Location	Ref
1	2002	Millie Hill bat cave	Iron Mountain, Michigan	
2	2003	Cranbrook Institute of Science	Bloomfield Hills, Michigan	
3	2004	Cranbrook Institute of Science	Bloomfield Hills, Michigan	
4	2005		Iron Mountain, Michigan	
5	2006			
6	2007	Indiana State University	Terre Haute, Indiana	
7	2008			
8	2009	Milwaukee Zoo	Milwaukee, Wisconsin	
9	2010	Cranbrook Institute of Science	Bloomfield Hills, Michigan	
10	2011	Cranbrook Institute of Science	Bloomfield Hills, Michigan	
11	2012	Southfield Civic Center Arena	Southfield, Michigan	
12	2013	Southfield Pavilion	Southfield, Michigan	
13	2014	Ann Arbor Hands-On Museum	Ann Arbor, Michigan	
14	2015	Cranbrook Institute of Science	Bloomfield Hills, Michigan	
15	2016	Macomb Intermediate School District	Clinton Township, Michigan	
16	2017	Michigan Science Center	Detroit, Michigan	
17	2018	Potter Park Zoo	Lansing, Michigan	
18	2019	Belle Isle Nature Center (Detroit Zoo)	Detroit, Michigan	

== Dissolution ==
The Great Lakes Bat Festival was dissolved in 2018 due to its organizer, Organization for Bat Conservation, ceasing operations. This was because of the termination of its co-founder, Rob Mies, as well as financial issues.

== Notable speakers and guests ==
- Jannell Cannon (Artist & Author of award-winning book Stellaluna)
- Fiona Reid (Artist & Author)
- Bill Schutt (author of the critically acclaimed book Dark Banquet)
- Dr. John Whitaker, Jr. (Indiana State University)
- Dr. Al Kurta (Eastern Michigan University)
- Dr. Tim Carter (Ball State University)
- Rob Mies (Organization for Bat Conservation)
- Bill Scullon (Michigan Department of Natural Resources)
- Mike Frayer (Milwaukee County Zoo)
