= Paul Feldhausen =

American football player (born 1946)

No. 66
- Position: Offensive tackle

Personal information
- Born: June 14, 1946 (age 80); Madison, Wisconsin, U.S.
- Listed height: 6 ft 6 in (1.98 m)
- Listed weight: 260 lb (118 kg)

Career information
- High school: Iron Mountain (Iron Mountain, Michigan)
- College: Northland College (1964-1967)
- NFL draft: 1968: 11th round, 278th overall pick

Career history
- Boston Patriots (1968)

Career AFL statistics
- Games played: 2
- Stats at Pro Football Reference

Paul Elvie Feldhausen (born June 14, 1946) is an American former professional football player in the American Football League (AFL) for the Boston Patriots in 1968 as a tackle.

== Career ==
Feldhausen was a nine letterwinner and MVP of both the football and basketball teams at Iron Mountain High School in 1963-64. Feldhausen then attended Northland College in Wisconsin where he was two-time football captain and Little All-America lineman in 1966-67, eventually being inducted to the Northland Sports Hall of Fame in 1991. He also became the first recipient of the Voltaire Perkins award as Most Valuable Player for the Northland College football team.

Feldhausen was selected in the 11th round of the 1968 NFL/AFL draft to the Boston Patriots. He played as a tackle for the team for three seasons, but only played in two games, both in the 1968 season. After three years with the Patriots, he suffered a back injury in a blocking dummy accident and subsequently had to retire from the league.

After retiring, he spent 40 years as a football and baseball official for the Wisconsin Interscholastic Athletic Association, and was the 1993 National Federation of State High School Associations Umpire of the Year.

== See also ==
- New England Patriots players
