= WDMJ =

Coordinates: 46°32′42.76″N 87°26′40.5″W

- Marquette, Michigan; United States
- Broadcast area: Marquette County, Michigan
- Frequency: 1320 kHz
- Branding: Marquette County's Greatest Hits

Programming
- Format: Oldies
- Affiliations: Fox News Radio

Ownership
- Owner: AMC Partners, LLC; (AMC Partners Escanaba, LLC)
- Sister stations: WCHT; WIMK; WJPD; WMIQ; WZNL

History
- First air date: 1931 (as WBEO)
- Former call signs: WBEO (1931–1939)
- Call sign meaning: Daily Mining Journal

Technical information
- Licensing authority: FCC
- Facility ID: 24448
- Class: D
- Power: 5,000 watts day; 140 watts night

Links
- Public license information: Public file; LMS
- Website: www.radioresultsnetwork.com/greatest-hits-1320-wdmj/

WDMJ (1320 AM) is an oldies radio station licensed to Marquette, Michigan, with a power output of 5,000 watts during the day and 140 watts at night, covering much of Marquette County, Michigan. The station is owned by Armada Media Corporation, through licensee AMC Partners Escanaba, LLC, doing business as the Radio Results Network and broadcasts from studios on Ridge Street in West Marquette.

== History ==
WDMJ has been broadcasting for nearly 100 years. It is the oldest radio station in Marquette County, Michigan and is the second oldest continuously operating radio station in the Upper Peninsula, only behind WCCY in Houghton.

First known as WBEO, the station began broadcasting on July 2, 1931, first on AM 1310, later changing its call sign to WDMJ on November 15, 1939, with DMJ standing for the Daily Mining Journal, Marquette's daily newspaper. As part of a larger re-alignment of AM radio station frequencies, WDMJ shortly operated on AM 1340 from 1941 to 1949 with 250 watts of power, with the transmitter located on West Washington Street.

In 1949, the station applied to operate on AM 1320 with 1,000 watts of power, utilizing a three tower directional antenna array from a new site just outside the city limits, on what would appropriately be named Tower Road. In 1965, the newspaper was sold to the Panax Corporation under the ownership of John P. McGoff. WDMJ was not included in this sale, and was transferred to longtime Mining Journal owner-publisher Frank J Russell.

In 1966 an FM station at 95.7 was added, known as WDMJ-FM. After only a few years, new owners (Now operating as WDMJ, Inc.) spun off the FM station, eventually selling it to a religious group, becoming WHWL. WDMJ upgraded to a 5,000 watt daytime signal in 1978, while remaining 1,000 watts at night utilizing the three tower directional array.

The station's call sign also appeared on the Upper Peninsula's first television station. WDMJ-TV was launched in 1956 from studios on the top floor of the Mining Journal building on Washington Street in Downtown Marquette, until it moved to Negaunee Township in 1964. The TV station was sold to the Post Corporation, owners of WLUK-TV in Green Bay, Wisconsin in 1964, who changed the calls to WLUC-TV.

WDMJ's format mostly consisted of middle of the road (MOR) music with a heavy emphasis on news and sports. It was known for broadcasting local hockey games, and Detroit Tigers baseball. During the 1960s and 1970s, the station would occasionally air country music and Top-40 music during specialty shows nights and weekends. WDMJ transitioned to a mostly automated adult contemporary format by the 1990s, and began simulcasting with Ishpeming sister station WIAN at 1240 AM in 1992. In the December 1998, WIAN and WDMJ switched to a news-talk format featuring personalities such as Rush Limbaugh, Sean Hannity, and Dr. Laura.

In 2003, WDMJ removed two of the three towers from the Tower Road transmitter site. The station's daytime power of 5,000 watts non-directional was unaffected, however nighttime power was severely reduced to 135 watts as the station was no longer able to operate with a directional antenna but still needed to protect other station son AM 1320 at night.

On May 11, 2020, a fire broke out at the WDMJ transmitter site, causing a "Complete antenna failure," according to the station's Special Temporary Authority (STA) filing with the Federal Communications Commission. The station requested to use a temporary long wire antenna and to reduce operations to 100 watts.

WDMJ's programming continued to simulcast on WIAN until July 30, 2020, when Sovereign Communications surrendered WIAN's license.

WDMJ's news-talk logo

In March 2022, WDMJ along with WJPD and several stations in Iron Mountain were sold to AMC Media Partners. WDMJ's programming was re-aligned to feature the same lineup of syndicated conservative talk radio as sister stations WCHT and WMIQ.

WDMJ resumed operation at full power of 5,000 watts during the day and 140 watts at night under a construction permit issued in November 2023 from a newly rebuilt tower on Tower Road in Marquette Township. The tower also house the antenna for the booster transmitter for sister station WUPG and low powered FM religious station WNOA.

On July 1, 2024, WDMJ changed its format from conservative talk to oldies.
