= Kingsford (charcoal) =

Brand of charcoal briquette

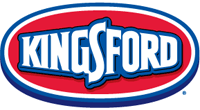
- Product type: Charcoal
- Current owner: The Clorox Company
- Country: United States
- Introduced: 1920; 106 years ago
- Markets: Worldwide
- Previous owners: Ford Charcoal
- Tagline: "Start Something"
- Website: kingsford.com

Kingsford is a brand that makes charcoal briquettes, along with related products, used for grilling. Established in 1920 by Henry Ford, the brand is now owned by the Clorox Company. Currently, the Kingsford Products Company remains the leading manufacturer of charcoal in the United States, with 80% market share. More than 1 million tons of wood scraps are converted into charcoal briquettes annually.

== History ==
The Ford Motor Company sold more than one million Ford Model Ts in 1919. Each one used 100 board feet of wood for parts such as the frame, dashboard, steering wheel, and wheels. Because of the amount of wood needed, Henry Ford decided to produce his own supply. He enlisted the help of Edward G. Kingsford, a real estate agent and timber cruiser from Michigan, to locate a supply of wood. Kingsford's wife was a cousin of Ford. In the early 1920s, Ford acquired large timberland in Iron Mountain, Michigan, and built a sawmill and parts plant in a neighboring area which subsequently became Kingsford, Michigan. The mill and plants produced sufficient parts for the cars, but generated waste such as stumps, branches and sawdust. Ford suggested that all wood scraps be processed into charcoal.

A University of Oregon chemist, Orin Stafford, invented a method for making pillow-shaped lumps of fuel from sawdust and mill waste combined with tar and bound together with cornstarch. He called the lumps "charcoal briquettes." Thomas Edison designed the briquette factory adjacent to the sawmill and Kingsford ran it. Ford named the new business Ford Charcoal. It was a model of efficiency, producing 610 lb (280 kg) of briquettes for every ton of scrap wood. In the beginning, Ford's "briquettes" were sold only through Ford dealerships. The charcoal was marketed to meat and fish smokehouses, but demand soon exceeded supply.

By the mid-1930s, Ford was marketing "Picnic Kits" containing charcoal and portable grills, capitalizing on the link between motoring and outdoor adventure that his vagabond travels popularized. "Enjoy a modern picnic," the packages read, "Sizzling broiled meats, steaming coffee, toasted sandwiches." But it wasn't until after World War II that backyard barbecuing took off, thanks to suburban migration, the invention of the Weber grill, and increased marketing efforts. In 1951 an investment group led by Arthur and William Grede of Milwaukee bought Ford Charcoal and took over operations, renaming it Kingsford Chemical Company reflecting its association with Kingsford, Michigan. It was renamed to Kingsford Company in 1957. Kingsford Company was later acquired by Clorox in 1973.

== Manufacturing ==
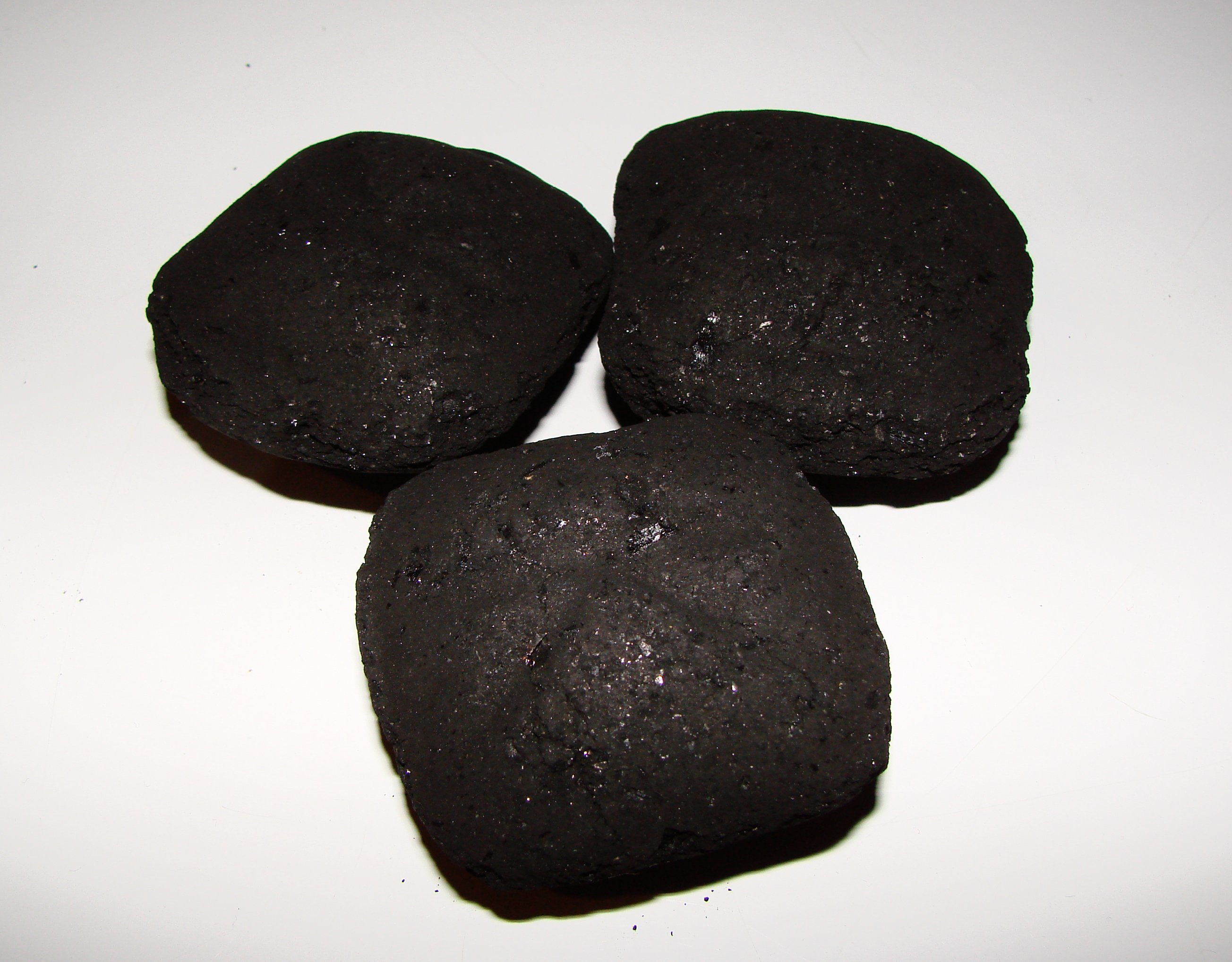
Kingsford Charcoal Briquettes

Kingsford charcoal is made by charring hardwoods such as oak, maple, hickory, walnut, etc., depending on the regional manufacturing plant. That char is then mixed with other ingredients to make a charcoal briquette. As of January 2016, Kingsford Charcoal contains the following ingredients:

- Wood char - Fuel for heating
- Mineral char - Fuel for heating
- Mineral carbon - Fuel for heating
- Limestone - Uniform visual ashing
- Starch - Binding agent
- Borax - Release from press molds
- Sawdust - Accelerate ignition

The raw materials, primarily wood scraps from regional sawmills, are delivered to Kingsford factories. The material undergoes magnetic filtration to remove any foreign metal objects. The wood scraps are milled into smaller wood chips. The material then moves into an industrial dryer filled with hot air to remove any moisture. The wood chips are later processed through a large furnace with multiple hearths (called a retort) in an oxygen controlled atmosphere that chars the wood without it burning. The wood gets progressively more charred as it drops from one hearth to the next. The charred wood chips are combined with the other dry ingredients and go through a hammermill which breaks everything down into small particles. This moves to a mixer where it is combined with the wet ingredients, starch and borax. This mixture is press formed into pillow-shaped briquettes, then moved on to be dried before being packaged for sale.

Kingsford also retails products that combine their charcoal with other flavors and spices to create flavored smoke.

== Plant locations ==
=== Charcoal facilities ===
- Belle, Missouri
- Burnside, Kentucky
- Parsons, West Virginia
- Springfield, Oregon

=== Retort facilities ===
- Beryl, West Virginia
- Glen, Mississippi
- Summer Shade, Kentucky
