= Hugh McGinnis =

Hugh McGinnis

Hugh Thomas McGinnis (April 11, 1870 in Castlewellan, Ireland – March 22, 1965 in Iron Mountain, Michigan) was the last survivor of the 7th Cavalry at Wounded Knee. He emigrated from Ireland to America in 1887, he lived in New York and St Louis, Missouri with his sister prior to enlisting in the U.S. Army in 1890. He was a twenty-year-old private in Co. K, 1st Battalion, 7th Cavalry during the Wounded Knee Massacre, where he was wounded twice.

McGinnis wrote an extensive account of his experiences at Wounded Knee which was published in Real West Magazine in January 1966:

The screams of mothers as machine gun bullets tore their bodies apart. The curses of the Indian warriors, fighting machine guns and cannons with old muskets, knives and tomahawks, being cut down in rows by demon-crazed white soldiers.

All this happened seventy-four years ago at Wounded Knee Creek where soldiers of the 7th cavalry massacred in cold blood Indian men, women and children. I am now ninety-four, the last surviving member of Troop K, 7th Cavalry. The seventy-four years have never completely erased the ghastly horror of that scene and I still awake at night from nightmarish dreams of that massacre. The news that I am the only surviving member of the 7th Cavalry at that massacre brings back many memories to me.

McGinnis was discharged from military service in 1891, when he moved to Wisconsin and worked as a lumberjack. He died in Iron Mountain, Michigan.
