= Edward G. Kingsford =

American businessman

- Born: Edward George Kingsford; March 1, 1862; Woodstock, Canada West
- Died: July 19, 1943 (aged 81); Iron Mountain, Michigan, U.S.
- Burial place: Iron Mountain Cemetery Park; 45.8068274°N 88.0632286°E
- Occupations: American timber cruiser, real estate developer, and automotive executive
- Employers: Ford Motor Company; Michigan Iron, Land and Lumber Company
- Known for: Co-founder of Ford Charcoal, later to become Kingsford Charcoal; Namesake of the town in Michigan
- Spouse: Mary Frances Flaherty (m. 1890; died 1943)
- Children: 3

Edward George Kingsford (March 1, 1862 – July 19, 1943) was an American timber cruiser, real estate developer, and automotive executive, who became the authorized representative for the Ford Motor Company and developed the Ford factory in what would later become Kingsford, Michigan; the town is named for Kingsford.

Kingsford was born on March 1, 1862, in Woodstock, Canada West. He was invited by Henry Ford in 1919 to a camping trip in the Upper Peninsula of Michigan along with Thomas Edison, Harvey Firestone and John Burroughs. Ford wanted to produce timber for his operations; a Ford Model T used about 100 board feet of hardwood. In August 1920, he became the vice-president of the Michigan Iron, Land and Lumber Company, organized to carry out the operation of a sawmill and auto body plant. The company was absorbed into Ford in 1923, and Kingsford carried on as general manager for Ford.

Ford was upset by wasted wood by-products at the plant, and Edison designed an adjacent factory to turn the sawdust and wood scrap from the lumber mill into charcoal briquets. An adjacent community was planned by Ford Motor, named for Kingsford and incorporated as a village in 1924; it was later reincorporated as a city in 1947. Ford Charcoal was later purchased in 1951 and renamed Kingsford.

Kingsford married Mary Frances "Minnie" Flaherty on April 8, 1890 (December 5, 1865 – May 8, 1943). She was a first cousin of Henry Ford. They had two sons and a daughter. Kingsford died in Iron Mountain, Michigan on July 19, 1943.
