= WLUC-TV =

Television station in Marquette, Michigan

- Marquette, Michigan; United States
- Channels: Digital: 35 (UHF); Virtual: 6
- Branding: TV6; Fox UP (6.2)

Programming
- Affiliations: 6.1: NBC; 6.2: Fox; for others, see § Subchannels

Ownership
- Owner: Gray Media; (Gray Television Licensee, LLC)

History
- First air date: April 28, 1956
- Former call signs: WDMJ-TV (1956–1964)
- Former channel numbers: Analog: 6 (VHF, 1956–2009)
- Former affiliations: CBS (1956–1992); ABC (secondary 1956–1983, primary 1992–1995); NBC (secondary, 1956–1969 and 1983–1995); Fox (secondary, 1992–1995)
- Call sign meaning: "Lucky 6" (former sister station to Green Bay's WLUK-TV)

Technical information
- Licensing authority: FCC
- Facility ID: 21259
- ERP: 100 kW
- HAAT: 258.3 m (847 ft)
- Transmitter coordinates: 46°20′11″N 87°50′56″W
- Translator(s): W14EM-D Marquette (city)

Links
- Public license information: Public file; LMS
- Website: www.uppermichiganssource.com

WLUC-TV (channel 6) is a television station licensed to Marquette, Michigan, United States, serving the Central and Western Upper Peninsula of Michigan as an affiliate of NBC and Fox. Owned by Gray Media, the station has studios on US 41/M-28 in Negaunee Township, and its transmitter is located on South Helen Lake Road in Republic Township southeast of unincorporated Republic.

WLUC is relayed on translator station W14EM-D channel 14 (also mapped to virtual channel 6) from the top of the Landmark Inn in Marquette in order to extend its primary signal; the translator is used for areas of Marquette that get a poor reception from the station's main transmitter.

== History ==
Channel 6 signed on April 28, 1956, as WDMJ-TV, the Upper Peninsula's first television station. The station carried programming from all three networks offered at that time, but was a primary CBS affiliate. WDMJ-TV was owned by the Daily Mining Journal along with WDMJ radio (1320 AM). Its studios were on the top floor of the Mining Journal building on Washington Street in Downtown Marquette. The station quickly outgrew its facilities. In 1959, channel 6 moved into its current studios in Negaunee Township. In 1964, it was sold to Post Corporation, owners of WLUK-TV in Green Bay, Wisconsin, who changed the calls to WLUC-TV to match its moniker at the time "Lucky 6". Channel 6 first aired network programs in color in 1963, and with the purchase of color video tape equipment, it began broadcasting all locally produced programs in color in 1969. The station moved its transmitter to southeast of Republic in 1980 and dismantled the original one near the Negaunee studios.

WLUC has been affected several times by television shakeups in Green Bay, since rival station WJMN-TV (channel 3) in Escanaba was formerly a semi-satellite of Green Bay-based WFRV-TV. For example, it dropped NBC programming in 1969 when WJMN signed on. In 1983, when WJMN-TV and WFRV-TV switched from NBC to ABC, WLUC took a secondary NBC affiliation. When CBS bought WFRV in 1992 and switched it from ABC, WLUC became a primary ABC station and continued its secondary NBC affiliation. It became solely NBC in 1995 when WLUK and WGBA-TV exchanged affiliations. As a result, it is one of the few stations in the country to have been with all of the big three networks. WLUC also carried some Fox programs in the early 1990s before WLUK switched to the network.

In late 2005 following Raycom Media's purchase of the Liberty Corporation, the company announced WLUC would be sold along with fellow NBC station WPBN-TV and full-time satellite WTOM-TV serving the Northern Lower and Eastern Upper Peninsula. The sale was necessary to help meet Federal Communications Commission (FCC) restrictions on station ownership. On March 27, 2006, Raycom sold 12 of its stations (including WLUC) to Barrington Broadcasting. The FCC approved the deal in June 2006 and the purchase closed August 11. WLUC joined WPBN/WTOM, Saginaw's WEYI-TV, and Toledo's WNWO-TV as part of Barrington's family of stations in and around Michigan.

Like many other Barrington-owned stations (including WTOM), WLUC operates a rather low-power (83 kW) UHF signal which has a much smaller coverage footprint than its former analog station. Its over-the-air digital signal covers less than half of the designated market area (DMA). Therefore, WLUC relies on cable as well as satellite carriers DirecTV and Dish Network to distribute programming to the entire area.

In August 2012, WLUC and Fox UP became the official affiliates of the Green Bay Packers Television Network for the Marquette–Escanaba market, taking over for WJMN, which lost the rights to team programming as the last contract ended, which was included as a part of WFRV's official station status in the Green Bay market. The station carries preseason games on the "state network" (as the Packers Television Network has been traditionally called), along with the team's Tuesday night coach's show and other official team programming.

On February 28, 2013, Barrington Broadcasting announced the sale of its entire group, including WLUC, to Sinclair Broadcast Group. The sale was completed on November 25. After 30 years of separate ownership, WLUC and WLUK in Green Bay were briefly reunited as sister stations on December 19, 2014, when Sinclair purchased WLUK and WCWF as part of required sales of stations by LIN Media in order to merge with Media General, which already owned Green Bay's WBAY-TV.

On October 1, 2015, Gray Television announced that it would acquire WLUC-TV from Sinclair; in return, Sinclair would receive WSBT-TV in South Bend, Indiana, from Gray. The swap, part of Gray's acquisition of the broadcasting assets of Schurz Communications (owner of WSBT), was necessary as Gray already owned WNDU-TV in South Bend. The sale was completed on February 16, 2016. A few months later, Gray acquired Green Bay station WBAY-TV, due to divestments made during Nexstar Media Group's acquisition of Media General.

On June 25, 2018, Gray announced it was merging with Raycom. While the deal did not affect WLUC directly, the completion of the deal in January 2019 reunited WLUC with many of its former sister stations from its years under Raycom ownership.

=== 1959 World Series blackouts ===
WLUC became a victim in a string of incidents between October 1 and 4, 1959, after its original Lathrop microwave station was blacked out by a disgruntled former station employee, which hijacked the first three broadcasts of the 1959 World Series. Then-manager John Borgen replied to Michigan outlets that the former employee, 36-year-old Harold William Lindgren of Marquette, suffered mental health issues and had originally planned his own revenge to the station by swiping a steel wool scouring pad from his wife's sink and drove 35 miles (56 km) south to Lathrop on the evening of September 30, before climbing a fence around the transmitter and used a ball-point pen before stuffing the pad into a pipe of the relay equipment the following evening, which blocked the video portions only, leaving the audio portion intact. Borgen called the interruption "a diabolical plot". The hijacks immediately led engineers from Chicago and Green Bay to investigate for four days before Lindgren was quickly arrested by Michigan State Police and immediately facing a possible four-year jail sentence. Lindgren told court officials that he wanted to "jam the signal" over his frustration at Borgen after firing Lindgren the previous month.

=== Suomi Kutsuu ===
For 53 years and more than 2,650 weekly episodes straight, WLUC produced an hour-long show called Suomi Kutsuu (Finland Calling), the only Finnish language program in the United States. The show debuted on March 27, 1962, initially created to boost tourism to Nordic countries, and featured Finnish culture, music, and discussions with wide-ranging guests including taxi drivers, out-of-town visitors to the area, and several presidents of Finland.

The host of every episode was Carl Pellonpaa, a former figure on Finnish radio who wore a signature powder blue sport coat. Camera operators had to learn a few words of Finnish just to be able to follow the show.

"In November I did a swan dive onto my garage floor and fractured my knee cap and sprained my right wrist and battered my face up a little bit like in a boxing match ... the kids piled me into the back seat and I laid there and they took me to the studio and I did the show."
– Carl Pellonpaa, 2015

Pellonpaa never missed an episode despite having open-heart surgery, two hip replacements, and cancer throughout his tenure. In the 1960s, he once hosted the show via telephone because he had mumps. Over the decades, Pellonpaa switched from a live broadcast to pre-taping the program on Wednesdays, and he began to incorporate more English translations. In the show's early years, about 25% of the Marquette area had Norwegian ancestry.

Pellonpaa became a beloved figure among Yoopers. In the Marquette area, his Nielsen ratings beat Fox News Sunday and NBC's Meet the Press. When 84-year-old Pellonpaa announced his retirement, with the Suomi Kutsuu series finale on March 29, 2015, The Wall Street Journal wrote that Pellonpaa's career "far outpaces David Letterman, Johnny Carson and Saturday Night Live. Some might say he is Finnished."

Pellonpaa hosted 22 tours to Finland and dozens of dances to Finnish music. In 1988, he was awarded the Order of the White Rose from then President Mauno Koivisto for hosting the program and for inspiring tourism to Finland. Carl Pellonpaa died on September 1, 2018.

=== Previous logo ===
Previous logo.

WLUC used the same multicolored "6" logo for many years from as early as the early 1990s until September 2008. From about 1989 until 1992, a similar metallic-looking "6" was used with a rainbow slash underneath. The rainbow, while used with on-air promos and the news open, was never used on mic flags during this time. From the time WLUC went on the air in 1956, network logos were always separate from the channel logo. That changed in 1992 when the ABC ball was lodged inside the "6".

When the station switched to primary NBC in 1995, it simply replaced the ABC logo with the letters "NBC" rather than place the network's peacock alongside the "6" as many NBC affiliates do. The logo design, however, became somewhat dated at that point as computer graphics improved and the years went on. From this point until abandoning the rainbow "6", a viewer unfamiliar to the market could accidentally discern that WLUC was an ABC affiliate. On September 8, 2008, it phased out its "multicolored" 6 logo and went with the letters "TV 6" inside an oval tilted to the right. It also changed its longtime slogan from "Someplace Special" (used since the early 1980s) to "Upper Michigan's Source".

== WLUC-DT2 ==
WLUC-DT2 is the Fox-affiliated second digital subchannel of WLUC-TV, broadcasting in 720p high definition on channel 6.2. In mid-February 2022, the over-the-air signal of WLUC-DT2 was upgraded to 720p HD; ever since its inception, the subchannel had broadcast in 480i widescreen standard definition, while an HD feed was carried on local cable systems.

=== History ===
WLUC-DT2 signed-on at some point in late 2005 (under Raycom Media ownership) carrying The Tube Music Network. After that network shut down on October 1, 2007, due to a lack of advertising, NBC Weather Plus was added. Later, Weather Plus was dropped in favor of Universal Sports. Throughout its association with those three services, WLUC-DT2 was carried on Charter digital channel 306.

In July 2009, WLUC announced it would begin carrying Fox on its second digital subchannel starting August 17. It replaced Universal Sports which was relegated to late-night hours while programming from America One was added in a secondary nature. The subchannel replaced WZMQ (formerly WMQF) as the area's Fox affiliate after it temporarily suspended programming when its previous owner Equity Media Holdings declared Chapter 11 bankruptcy. WZMQ later went back on the air under more stable ownership, carrying a number of digital subchannel networks.

Previously outside of WZMQ (which during Equity's ownership, was often unable to be received outside of Ishpeming and Marquette due to continuous transmitter issues and lack of engineering staff), Fox was available in the Upper Peninsula over-the-air from WLUK in Menominee County and via a low powered translator of that station in Escanaba, W40AN. WLUK was carried by Spectrum in the West and Central Upper Peninsula along with WLUC-DT2 except in Gogebic County which is covered by KQDS-TV from Duluth, Minnesota. The Eastern Upper Peninsula is covered by WWUP-DT 10.2 (a simulcast of WFQX-TV in Cadillac).

In 2012, lobbying from WLUC, combined with new affiliation requirements from Fox disallowing cable carriage from other affiliates outside a station's market, forced WLUK from most cable systems in the western and central portions of the Upper Peninsula. There were no changes on DirecTV since WLUK was never available to viewers outside Menominee County in the Upper Peninsula. As Sinclair acquired WLUK from their owners LIN Media as part of LIN's merger with Media General in mid-December 2014, the issues between WLUK and WLUC-DT2, including the Escanaba translator issue, were resolved in the time they were under common ownership before WLUC's sale to Gray Television. This included the eventual closedown of W40AN in the summer of 2018, along with new carriage agreements with local providers which gave preference to WLUC-DT2 over WLUK.

The subchannel used to be an affiliate of America One during the late-night and morning hours, which also provided the subchannel's programming for E/I requirements. This ended as more syndicated programming was placed on the Fox UP schedule, along with Sinclair and Gray's existing contracts to provide E/I programming for their stations.

== News operation ==
For its entire existence, WLUC has held the number-one spot in local Nielsen ratings by a wide margin. Its news has won awards including two Certificates of Merit from the Good News Awards in 2012. WLUC has a much larger news department than either of its competitors; ABC affiliate WBUP has only been airing newscasts continuously since 2004 (an earlier attempt was abandoned due to low ratings and budget cuts), and MyNetworkTV (then-CBS) affiliate WJMN-TV did not offer coverage of its home territory until April 21, 2014. Prior to that date, WJMN did not employ any news personnel in the state of Michigan. WJMN did air brief Upper Peninsula-specific news and weather updates produced at WFRV's facilities in Green Bay. A fourth competitor, CBS affiliate WZMQ, began its news operation on January 21, 2022.

After WLUC-DT2 initially added Fox, it offered a nationally syndicated newscast weeknights at 6:30. The program was produced for America One by the Independent News Network from studios on Tremont Avenue in Davenport, Iowa. This was eventually dropped in favor syndicated programming as the subchannel developed more. Starting September 8, 2009, WLUC-DT2 began airing a local weeknight prime time broadcast (known as Your Fox UP News in Primetime) from a new secondary set. New segments such as viewer feedback, daily polls, and other features were introduced. There is no regular sports segment seen in the show although a quick update can be given on teams with local and regional interest. The broadcast competes with one airing at the same time on CW affiliate WBKP (produced by WBUP).

Unlike most NBC affiliates in the Eastern Time Zone, WLUC does not air newscasts at midday or weeknights at 5:30. In addition to its main studios, the station operates bureaus in Escanaba (on Ludington Street), Iron Mountain (on South Stephenson Avenue/US 2/US 141), and Houghton (on Shelden Avenue/US 41). The Iron Mountain Bureau also serves Kingsford while the Houghton Bureau also serves Hancock. Although there is no weekend morning show, WLUC repeats the previous night's late news on Saturday and Sunday mornings.

WLUC began broadcasting its news in 16:9 widescreen in April 2013. On September 6, 2017, WLUC debuted major upgrades to its studio, including a new, larger set and a rebuilt control room. Gray invested over $1 million into these changes.

== Technical information ==
=== Subchannels ===
The station's signal is multiplexed:

Subchannels of WLUC-TV
Subchannel	Res.	Short name	Programming
6.1	1080i	WLUCNBC	NBC
6.2	720p	WLUCFOX	Fox UP
6.3	480i	WLUCGRT	Grit
6.4	480i	WLUCOUT	Outlaw
6.5	480i	WLUCOXG	Oxygen

=== Analog-to-digital conversion ===
WLUC-TV ended regular programming on its analog signal, over VHF channel 6, on June 12, 2009, the official date on which full-power television stations in the United States transitioned from analog to digital broadcasts under federal mandate. The station's digital signal remained on its pre-transition UHF channel 35, using virtual channel 6.

=== Translator ===
City of license	Callsign	Channel	ERP	HAAT	Facility ID	Transmitter coordinates
Marquette	W14EM-D	14	15 kW	10 m (33 ft)	197887	46°32′41.0″N 87°23′31.5″W
