= Suomi Kutsuu =

American Finnish-language television variety show

- Also known as: Finland Calling
- Genre: Variety show
- Created by: Carl Pellonpaa; Eugene Sinervo
- Theme music composer: Jooseppi Riippa
- Opening theme: "Kotimaani ompi Suomi"
- Country of origin: United States
- Original languages: Finnish, English
- No. of episodes: 2,650

Production
- Production location: Marquette County, Michigan
- Running time: 1 hour

Original release
- Network: WLUC-TV
- Release: March 27, 1962 – March 29, 2015

Suomi Kutsuu (English: Finland Calling) was an American Finnish-language television variety show, broadcast by WLUC-TV in Marquette, Michigan. Suomi Kutsuu was the only Finnish-language TV show in the United States, and was hosted by Carl Pellonpaa from its premiere in 1962 to its finale in 2015. The program originated as a promotional program for local travel agents modeled on Hawaii Calls, and expanded into a 1-hour variety program that served both local and international audiences.

== History ==
WLUC-TV signed on in 1956 as WDMJ-TV, the television venture of Marquette newspaper the Daily Mining Journal. It was the first television station in the Upper Peninsula of Michigan. WDMJ-TV was primarily affiliated with CBS, with secondary affiliations with ABC and NBC. The station's current call sign was adopted in 1959.

Carl Pellonpaa, the show's co-creator and longtime host, was born in Ishpeming, Michigan, in 1930. He entered the field of broadcasting after losing a professional baseball contract due to a hunting injury, and was hired by WLUC in 1961 as a news and weather reporter. His colleague Eugene Sinervo (1916–1978) began as a studio artist for the station when it signed on, and expressed a desire to create a Finnish-language television program to serve the area's large Finnish American population. The Upper Peninsula had multiple established Finnish-language media outlets, including the newspaper Amerikan Suomalainen Lehti and radio programs on WHDF and WMPL.

To fund the new Finnish-language television program, Sinervo secured a sponsorship from a local travel agency. The travel agency sponsorship emulated the model of Hawaii Calls, a radio program which promoted tourism through Hawaiian music. Suomi Kutsuu premiered on March 27, 1962, hosted by Pellonpaa and Sinervo. Beginning as a half-hour program in an undesirable early Sunday morning time slot, Suomi Kutsuu drew a positive reception from viewers and advertisers, often selling out its advertising slots with both Finnish and English-language advertisements. Suomi Kutsuu was extended to a 1-hour time slot and moved later in the morning as its popularity grew. Pellonpaa recalled in 1990 that his Finnish was initially rudimentary, calling it "the laughingstock of the Finns up here".

The program promoted group tours to Finland, with its first tour departing for Helsinki in June 1962. It sponsored a total of 34 tours to Finland during the program's 53-year history. Suomi Kutsuu also organized a series of dances across the Upper Peninsula, the first of which was held in 1966 at a National Guard armory in Ishpeming.

== Format ==
The format of Suomi Kutsuu frequently emphasized travel. The program regularly featured formal and informal visitors to the Upper Peninsula from Finland, ranging from friends of Pellonpaa's family from Ähtäri to an organized delegation from Marquette's sister city Kajaani. In a 2021 analysis of the program's background and impact, University of Turku media studies scholar Mari Pajala argued that the program "created a sense of friendly, familiar, and frequent contact between the Upper Peninsula and Finland. The program's image of the Upper Peninsula was not that of an isolated, marginally placed region; rather, it emphasized transnational connectivity."

The program's theme music, "Kotimaani ompi Suomi" ("Finland Is My Home"), was composed by Hancock resident Jooseppi Riippa (1868–1896).

Suomi Kutsuu frequently featured Finnish dance and popular music, including recordings by accordionist Veikko Ahvenainen and singers Tapio Rautavaara and Mauno Kuusisto.

From 1965 to 1995, the program concluded with a religious segment hosted by Finnish-speaking pastors from local churches affiliated with the Lutheran Church in America and the Evangelical Lutheran Church in America.

== Guests ==
The program featured numerous guests over its history, including presidents of Finland Urho Kekkonen and Tarja Halonen. The program also featured a prime minister of Finland, ambassadors, and cultural exchange groups.

== Hosts ==
Pellonpaa was the program's main host for its entire run. Pellonpaa appeared in a blue-and-white suit, the colors of the Finnish flag. He co-hosted the program with colleague Eugene Sinervo until Sinervo's death in 1978.
