= WZNL =

Coordinates: 45.821°N 88.040°W

- Norway, Michigan; United States
- Broadcast area: Iron Mountain, Michigan and vicinity
- Frequency: 94.3 MHz
- Branding: 94.3 The Breeze

Programming
- Format: Soft adult contemporary
- Affiliations: MSU Spartan Sports Network; Fox News Radio

Ownership
- Owner: AMC Partners, LLC; (AMC Partners Escanaba, LLC)
- Sister stations: WDMJ, WIMK, WJPD, WMIQ

History
- First air date: March 15, 1990
- Former call signs: WNWY (2/10/88-3/2/90, CP); WJAU (11/10/87-2/10/88, CP)
- Call sign meaning: Zephyr Broadcasting's Northern Lights (previous owner and format)

Technical information
- Licensing authority: FCC
- Facility ID: 74549
- Class: C3
- ERP: 2,400 watts
- HAAT: 198 meters

Links
- Public license information: Public file; LMS
- Webcast: Listen Live
- Website: 94.3 The Breeze Online

WZNL (94.3 FM) is a soft adult contemporary radio station that is licensed to the City of Norway, Michigan and serving the greater Iron Mountain and Kingsford areas of Michigan's Upper Peninsula. The station is owned by Armada Media Corporation, through licensee AMC Partners Escanaba, LLC, doing business as the Radio Results Network and broadcasts from studios on Kent Street in Iron Mountain.

The station is branded as 94.3 The Breeze and features a local morning show hosted by Tom Hill. Most hours begin with a Fox News Radio update, local news, and weather.

WZNL is the Michigan State University Spartan Sports Network affiliate for the South-Central Upper Peninsula.

== History ==
The station signed on the air as "94.3 Michigan's Northern Lites", with a soft adult contemporary format on March 15, 1990. In the early 2000s, the station flipped to a hot adult contemporary format as "Z-94.3", and later "Star 94.3" in 2003. In July 2020, WZNL dropped its hot adult contemporary and returned back to its soft adult contemporary, branded as "The Breeze".

== Sources ==
- Michiguide.com - WZNL History
