= Iron Mountain High School =

Iron Mountain Middle/High School
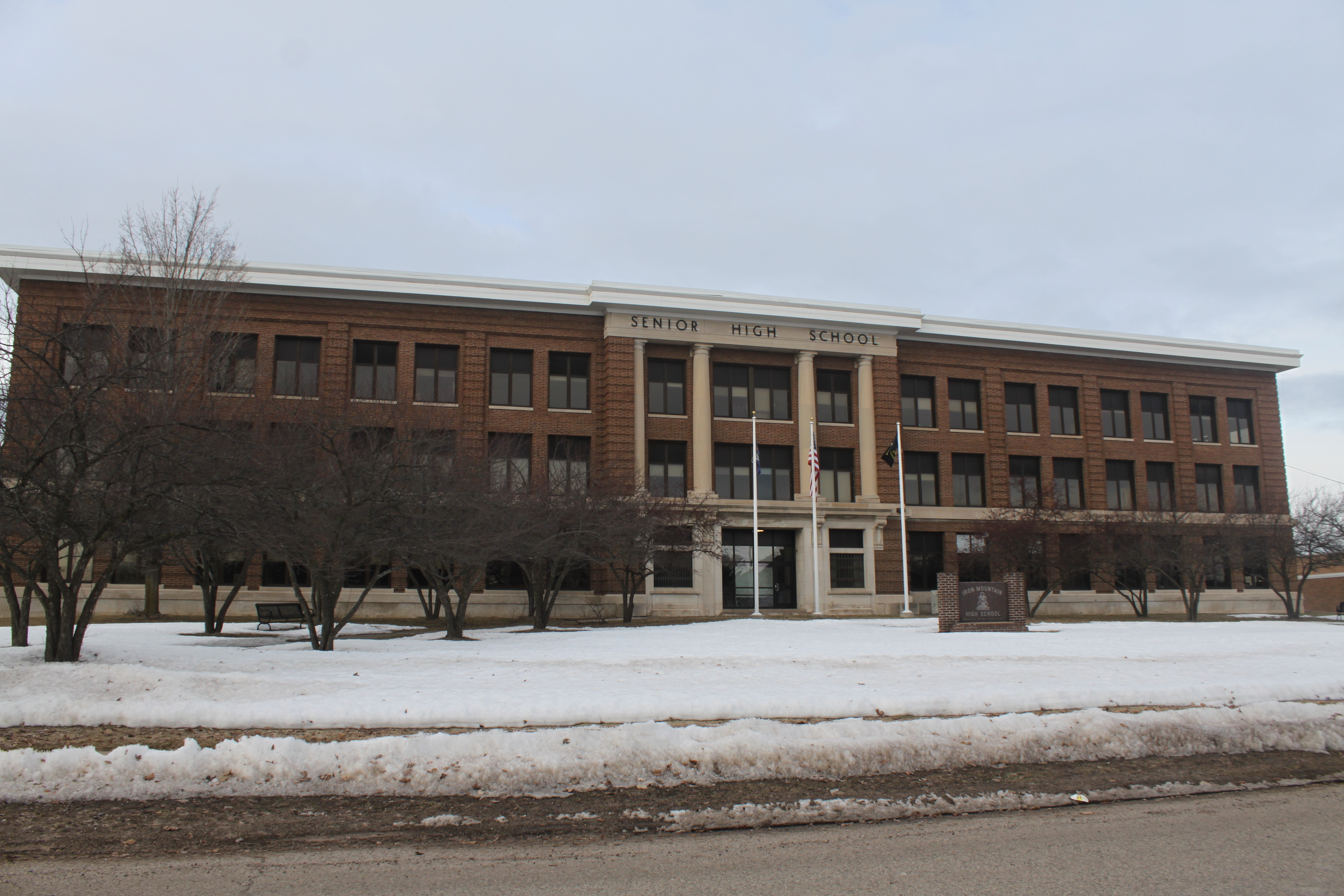
- The front of the school in March 2020

Location
- 300 West B Street; Iron Mountain, Michigan; United States; 45.818185°N 88.070411°W

Information
- Type: Public high school
- Motto: The relentless pursuit of student excellence
- Established: 1912
- School district: Iron Mountain Public Schools
- Principal: Sara Pericolosi
- Teaching staff: 10.62 (FTE)
- Enrollment: 243 (2024–2025)
- Student to teacher ratio: 22.88
- Colors: Black and Gold
- Athletics conference: Western Peninsula Athletic Conference
- Nickname: Mountaineers
- Website: www.imschools.org www.immountaineers.org

Iron Mountain High School is a public high school located in the city of Iron Mountain, Michigan, United States.

The Iron Mountain Public School District also includes North Elementary. As of 2026, Central Middle School building is now in use serving 4th-5th grade as North Elementary downtown campus. North Elementary School includes EK-5. The Iron Mountain Middle/High School includes 6-12. The North Elementary building holds grades EK–3. North Elementary downtown campus [previously known as Central Middle School building] holds 4-5th. The Iron Mountain Middle/High School building holds grades 6–12.

== History ==
The first school in the Iron Mountain area opened in 1881 on the corner of Brown and Iron Mountain Street, where classes were held from 1881 to 1893. Another one-room school was built sometime between 1882 and 1884 on Fifth Street in Iron Mountain. In 1884, the Central School building was built at 300 West B Street, where the current high school building stands. This building had two stories with eight rooms and housed all grades, and whose first graduating class of three students graduated in 1889. Subsequent public schools built in Iron Mountain before Iron Mountain High School were Chapin School in 1889, Ludington School in 1891, Hulst School in 1892, Lincoln School in 1896, Farragut School in 1899, and Washington School in 1900.

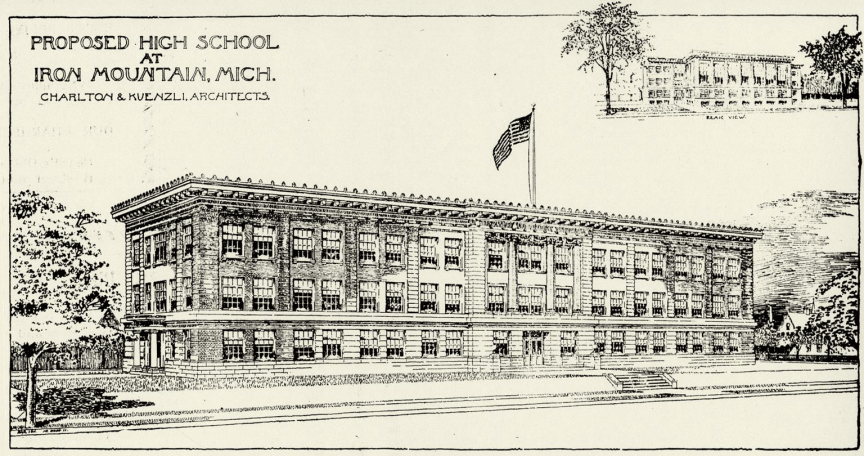
Sketch of the proposed Iron Mountain High School building published in the Iron Mountain Press May 11, 1911

Once it was decided that a new building needed to be constructed to accommodate the expanding population of the Iron Mountain area, the Central School building was relocated 2 blocks north. The Iron Mountain High School building was proposed in 1911 by architects Charlton & Kuenzli, and was built between 1911 and 1912. The building was opened in 1912 and classes began that same year. In 1914, Iron Mountain High School was one of eight different school buildings in the Iron Mountain area. From then on schools in Iron Mountain would continue to close their doors.

In 1937, classes stopped being held at the Central School and the building was razed to make way for a new Iron Mountain Junior High School. Later renamed Central Middle School, this building would house classes for junior high school students in the Iron Mountain Public School District. This building, completed in 1938, was a project under the Public Works Administration. The Public Works Administration supplied an $89,860 grant for the project, whose total cost was $201,387.

An addition was built alongside the Central Middle School building in 1994, which included five classrooms, a gymnasium, a cafeteria, and locker rooms. Eventually, the Central Middle School building held classes for K-8 students, but in 2014, plans to sell or demolish the Central Middle School building were discussed as the classes once taught here were transferred to the Iron Mountain High School building. Beginning in 2015, the Iron Mountain High School building holds all grade 5-12 students in the Iron Mountain Public School District, while the North Elementary building, located on the north side of Iron Mountain, holds grades EK-4.

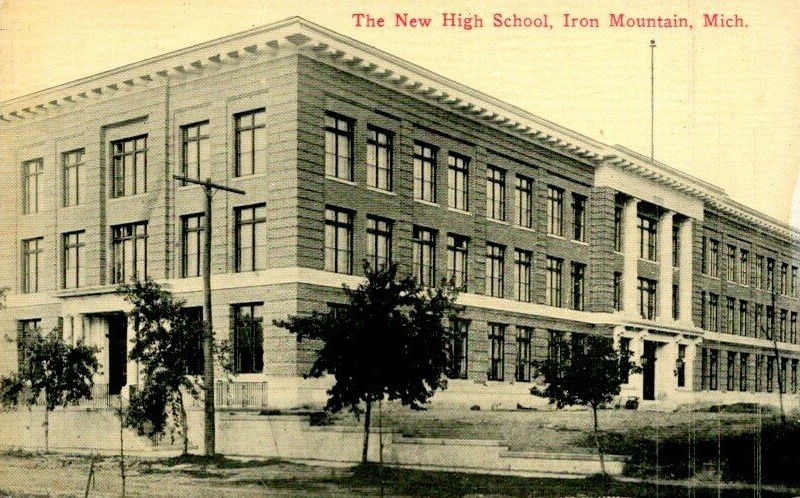
Postcard depicting "The New High School," 1910s

== Demographics ==
2019-2020

Enrollment by Grade
	9	10	11	12
Students	66	73	63	71

Enrollment by Race/Ethnicity
	American Indian/Alaska Native	Asian	Black	Hispanic	Native Hawaiian/Pacific Islander	White	Two or More Races
Students	0	5	6	11	0	238	13

== Athletics ==
In 2017, the Western Peninsula Athletic Conference accepted Iron Mountain, among four other schools, to transfer from the Mid-Peninsula Athletic Conference in all sports. This transfer ended the 93-year football rivalry between Iron Mountain and neighboring school Kingsford High School.

In 2019, the Iron Mountain Mountaineers boys' basketball team made statewide news when a controversial call in the final seconds of the Division 3 state championship decided the final outcome, with Iron Mountain losing 53-52.

Sport	Number of championships	Year
Basketball	3	1928, 1933, 1939
Bowling	1	2009
Cross Country	3	1937, 1938, 1987
Football	2	1993, 2000
Boys Golf	10	1950, 1951, 1964, 1968, 1969, 1970, 1983, 1987, 1999, 2005
Girls Golf	5	2004, 2005, 2013, 2014, 2016
Gymnastics	1	1973
Boys Tennis	23	1949, 1977, 1981, 1982, 1984, 1985, 1986, 1987, 1988, 1989, 1992, 1995, 1997, 1998, 1999, 2000, 2001, 2002, 2003, 2004, 2006, 2009, 2015
Girls Tennis	14	1977, 1978, 1979, 1981, 1982, 1985, 1986, 1988, 1989, 1990, 1995, 2001, 2008, 2010, 2021, 2022
Boys Track & Field	5	1981, 1983, 1987, 1989, 2000
Girls Track & Field	1	2004
Volleyball	1	1994
Wrestling	5	1967, 1970, 1972, 1982, 1983

== Notable alumni ==
=== Tom Izzo and Steve Mariucci ===
Michigan State head basketball coach Tom Izzo and sportscaster and former football coach Steve Mariucci went to school together and graduated from Iron Mountain High School in the 1970s. On Iron Mountain High School's campus stands the Izzo-Mariucci Center, which houses the gym, offices, and rooms for classes.

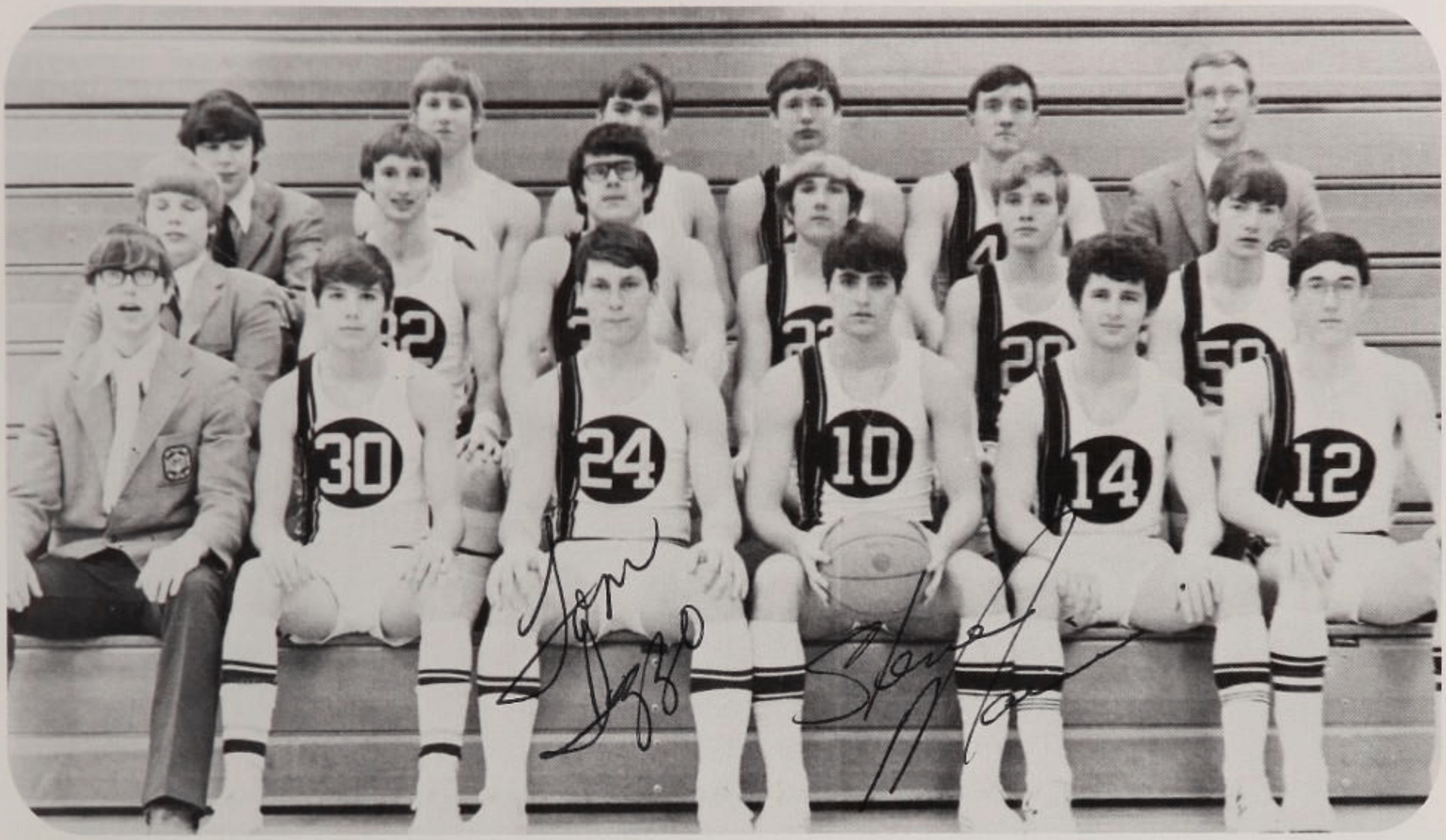
Tom Izzo and Steve Mariucci as members of the varsity basketball team, 1973

=== Other notable alumni ===
- John Biolo: Member of the 1939 Championship Packers Team
- Bob Landsee: Former Philadelphia Eagles player and Arena Football League coach
- Paul Feldhausen: Member of the 1968 Boston Patriots team
- Frosty Ferzacca: Head coach of many Michigan college football teams
- John Hubley: Pioneer and innovator in the American animation industry
- Omer LaJeunesse: College football player and head coach
