= CSA Air =

Cargo airline

CSA Air, Inc.
IATA	ICAO	Call sign
-	IRO	IRON AIR
- Founded: 1998
- Hubs: Iron Mountain Milwaukee
- Fleet size: 25
- Destinations: 22
- Parent company: Air T, Inc.
- Headquarters: Kingsford, Michigan, United States
- Website: csaair.com

CSA Air is a cargo airline based in Kingsford, Michigan, United States. It operates express cargo services in Michigan, Wisconsin, Indiana, South Dakota and Maine, operating 35 flights a day. Its main base is Ford Airport in Iron Mountain, Michigan and its air traffic control call sign Iron Air is derived from that city. It exclusively serves as an affiliate of FedEx Feeder, a regional service that operates as a subsidiary of FedEx Express.

== History ==
The airline was established in 1998 and as of 2024 is wholly owned by Air T, Inc.

== Fleet ==
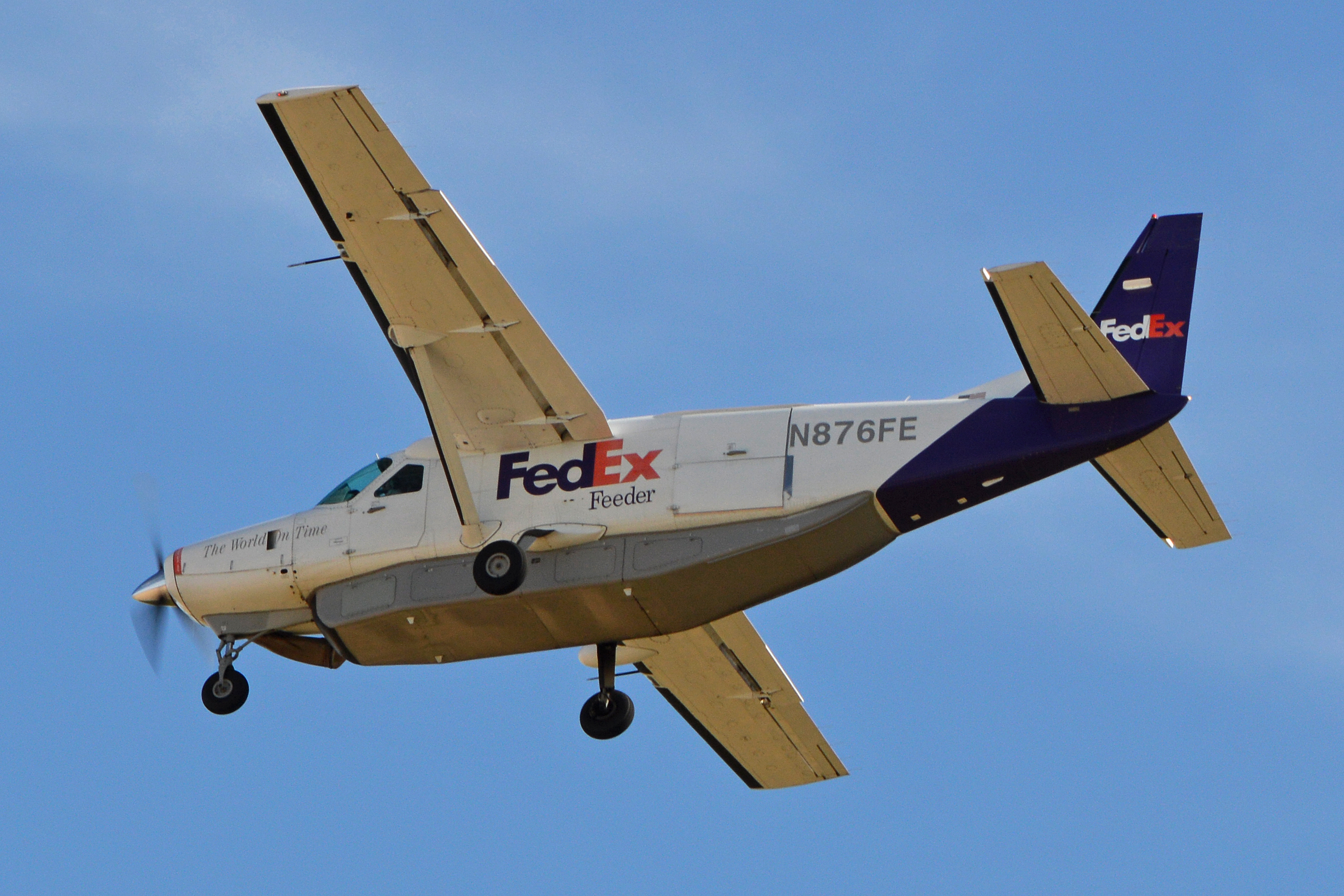
A FedEx Feeder Cessna 208B Super Cargomaster.

The CSA Air fleet consists of 25 Cessna 208 Caravans.

Aircraft	In fleet	Orders
Cessna 208 Caravan	25	–
Total	25	–

== Operations ==
In the United States, FedEx Express operates FedEx Feeder on a dry lease program where the contractor will lease the aircraft from the FedEx fleet and provide a crew to operate the aircraft solely for FedEx. All of the feeder aircraft operated in the United States are owned by FedEx and because of this all of the aircraft are in the FedEx Feeder livery. Just like regional airlines, the contractor will operate the aircraft with their own flight number and call sign.
