= WIMK =

Coordinates: 45.820°N 88.041°W

- Iron Mountain, Michigan; United States
- Broadcast area
- Frequency: 93.1 MHz
- Branding: 93.1 K-Rock

Programming
- Format: Active rock
- Affiliations: Compass Media Networks; Detroit Lions Radio Network

Ownership
- Owner: AMC Partners, LLC; (AMB Partners Escanba, LLC)
- Sister stations: WDMJ, WJPD, WMIQ, WZNL

History
- First air date: 1981
- Call sign meaning: Iron Mountain & Kingsford

Technical information
- Licensing authority: FCC
- Facility ID: 64027
- Class: C1
- ERP: 100,000 watts
- HAAT: 180 meters

Links
- Public license information: Public file; LMS
- Webcast: Listen Live
- Website: 93.1 K-Rock Online

WIMK (93.1 FM) is an active rock radio station that is licensed to the City of Iron Mountain, Michigan. The station is owned by Armada Media Corporation, through licensee AMC Partners Escanaba, LLC, doing business as the Radio Results Network and broadcasts from studios on Kent Street in Iron Mountain.

WIMK is the Detroit Lions Radio Network for the South-Central Upper Peninsula.

== History ==
WIMK began life in 1981 as a beautiful music station, before switching to country music by the early 1980s. In 1985, the station adopted a Top 40 (CHR) format as "K93," and then evolved to an album-oriented rock format later in the decade, originally branded as "K-Rock." By the 2000s, the station adopted the name "Classic Rock: The Bear", joining Northern Star's existing group of Northern Michigan stations with this branding, though their programming was not part of that specific network of stations, and aired its own music rotation.

Following the station's sale from Northern Star Broadcasting to Sovereign Communications in 2010, WIMK broke their simulcast and re-imaged as "93 Rock", adopting a similar identity, logo, and playlist as Rock 101, Sovereign's existing active rock station in Sault Ste. Marie, Michigan at WSUE 101.3 FM.

In July 2020, WIMK was sold to AMC Partners and re-branded as "93.1 K-Rock".

== Sources ==
- Michiguide.com - WIMK history
