= WJPD =

- Ishpeming, Michigan; United States
- Broadcast area: Marquette, Michigan
- Frequency: 92.3 MHz
- Branding: 92.3 WJPD

Programming
- Format: Country
- Affiliations: Premiere Networks

Ownership
- Owner: AMC Partners; (AMC Partners Escanaba, LLC)
- Sister stations: WDMJ; WIMK; WMIQ; WZNL

History
- First air date: 1975
- Former call signs: WJPD-FM (1975–1992)
- Call sign meaning: James P. Deegan

Technical information
- Licensing authority: FCC
- Facility ID: 24449
- Class: C1
- ERP: 100,000 watts
- HAAT: 155 meters (509 ft)
- Transmitter coordinates: 46°30′51″N 87°28′59″W

Links
- Public license information: Public file; LMS
- Webcast: Listen live
- Website: www.radioresultsnetwork.com/wjpd

WJPD (92.3 FM) is a country music radio station that is licensed to the City of Ishpeming, Michigan and serving the greater Marquette and Munising areas. The station is owned by Armada Media Corporation, through licensee AMC Partners Escanaba, LLC, doing business as the Radio Results Network and broadcasts from studios on Ridge Street in Marquette.

The station is branded as Fresh Country - 92.3 WJPD and shares the same personalities and playlist as sister station WCMM in the Escanaba area, however the two stations are not a pure simulcast, as they offer different commercial inventory.

WJPD is the Detroit Lions Radio Network for the north-central Upper Peninsula.

== History ==
The call sign WJPD was previously assigned to an AM station in Ishpeming. It began broadcasting November 16, 1947, on 1240 kHz with 1,000 watts daytime and 250 watts power nighttime. The call sign refers to the founder and original owner, James P. Deegan. WJPD-FM originated live programming in 1975, in simulcast with WJPD AM. Its original programming consisted of live, on-air music personalities, news personnel focused on local news in conjunction with carrying NBC Radio Network newscasts on the hour.

In addition, local public service announcements were read live by popular local on-air personalities. WJPD sportscasters provided live play by play coverage and sports shows of local High School athletics - broadcasting one game on AM and another game in FM. In addition, "Telephone Time" (a local live listener call-in show) was aired from 9-10 a.m. Monday through Saturday, in which callers could advertise personal items for sale or looking to purchase.

WJPD and WJPD-FM would not be simulcast on Sunday mornings, as both stations carried a number of local church services and specialized music programming.

WJPD was also a Milwaukee Brewers and Green Bay Packers network station, along with Northern Michigan Wildcats game broadcasts.

The music format (from inception in 1975 to 1981) was hot adult contemporary from 5:30 am to noon, country music from 12:30 to 6:00 pm, and mainstream pop and rock (along with recurrents and oldies) from 6 p.m. to midnight.

The music format became all country music in 1981 (with live, local DJs) and a continued emphasis on local news, weather, sports, and public address programming. WJPD and WJPD-FM consistently received the top Arbitron ratings for the listening coverage area during this time period.

This live, locally oriented, programming continued through the early 1990s, until private ownership sold WJPD and WJPD-FM to a nationwide media conglomerate. Several subsequent sales to other media conglomerates eliminated the locally oriented home-town station identity–and the 1240 AM station, which became WIAN in 1992 and closed in 2020–in favor of predominantly network satellite radio programming in 92.3 FM.

== Sources ==
- Michiguide.com - WJPD History
