= WMIQ =

Coordinates: 45°49′16″N 88°03′16″W

- Iron Mountain, Michigan; United States
- Broadcast area: Upper Peninsula
- Frequency: 1450 kHz
- Branding: Dickinson County's Greatest Hits

Programming
- Format: Oldies
- Affiliations: Detroit Lions Radio Network; Detroit Tigers Radio Network; Michigan State Spartans

Ownership
- Owner: AMC Partners, LLC; (AMC Partners Escanaba, LLC)
- Sister stations: WCHT, WDMJ, WIMK, WJPD, WZNL

History
- First air date: 1947

Technical information
- Licensing authority: FCC
- Facility ID: 64026
- Class: C
- Power: 1,000 watts unlimited

Links
- Public license information: Public file; LMS
- Website: Greatest Hits 1450 WMIQ - Radio Results Network

WMIQ (1450 AM) is an oldies radio station licensed to the City of Iron Mountain, Michigan. The station is owned by Armada Media Corporation, through licensee AMC Partners Escanaba, LLC, doing business as the Radio Results Network and broadcasts from studios on Kent Street in Iron Mountain.

On July 1, 2024, WMIQ changed their format from conservative talk to oldies.
