= WIAN =

- Ishpeming, Michigan; United States
- Frequency: 1240 kHz

History
- First air date: November 16, 1947
- Last air date: July 30, 2020
- Former call signs: WJPD (1947–1992)
- Call sign meaning: Ishpeming and Negaunee

Technical information
- Facility ID: 24450
- Class: C
- Power: 1,000 watts
- Transmitter coordinates: 46°30′15.8″N 87°40′19.5″W

WIAN (1240 AM) was a radio station licensed to Ishpeming, Michigan.

The station began broadcasting November 16, 1947, holding the call sign WJPD and operating with 250 watts full-time. Opening ceremonies were held in the Ishpeming High School auditorium, with Ward Quaal of WGN in Chicago serving as master of ceremonies. WJPD broadcast from facilities on US-41 in Ishpeming, with the studios later moving downtown. The station had studios on Front Street, Canda Street, and Division Streets in Ishpeming. In 1975, an FM sister station at 92.3 FM was added.

The station, whose slogan was "The Voice of the Iron Country," was licensed to Ishpeming Broadcasting Company. Its call sign stood for the founding owner's name, James P. Deegan. Locally, it was also referred to as "Where Joyful People Dwell".

The station's call sign was changed to WIAN on November 15, 1992. It changed formats from country, simulcasting 92.3 WJPD-FM, to adult contemporary, and began simulcasting AM 1320 WDMJ. In December 1998, WIAN and WDMJ adopted a talk/sports format. Its owner, Sovereign Communications, surrendered WIAN's license on July 30, 2020.
