= The Mining Journal =

Daily American newspaper

- Type: Daily newspaper
- Format: Broadsheet
- Owner: Ogden Newspapers
- Publisher: Ann Troutman
- Editor: Bud Sargent
- Founded: 1841 (as The Mining Journal)
- Headquarters: 249 W. Washington St. Marquette, Michigan 49855; United States
- Circulation: 9,411 Daily; 11,106 Sunday (as of 2022)
- ISSN: 0898-4964
- Website: miningjournal.net

The Mining Journal is a daily newspaper in Marquette, Michigan, serving the Upper Peninsula of Michigan. The Journal can be found in 14 of the 15 Upper Peninsula counties on weekends. The Mining Journal either maintains bureaus in many of the cities of the U.P., or shares news coverage with other Ogden-owned papers.

In August 2019, the Journal announced that they would be discontinuing the Sunday print edition and become a six-day-per-week newspaper.

== Broadcasting ==
The Mining Journal was the proprietor of Marquette's first television and radio stations. First known as WBEO, AM 1320 began broadcasting in 1931, later changing its call sign to WDMJ on November 15, 1939; DMJ standing for Daily Mining Journal. The newspaper would later add an FM station in 1966, known as WDMJ-FM, and would later become WHWL. Both stations remain on the air, albeit no longer under newspaper's ownership. The AM station is now owned by Armada Media Corporation also known as the Radio Results Network, while the FM station is owned by the Gospel Opportunities Radio Network. The radio station moved out of the newspaper building to the Hotel Northland in 1955.

In 1956, The Mining Journal launched WDMJ-TV, the Upper Peninsula's first television station. Its studios were on the top floor of the Mining Journal building on Washington Street in Downtown Marquette, until it moved to its present studios in Negaunee Township in 1964. The TV station was sold to the Post Corporation, owners of WLUK-TV in Green Bay, Wisconsin in 1964, who changed the calls to WLUC-TV. The station is now owned by Gray Media.

In 1965, the newspaper was sold to the Panax Corporation under the ownership of John P. McGoff. WDMJ was not included in this sale, and was transferred to longtime Mining Journal owner-publisher Frank J Russell.
