= Butch Wedin =

American ski jumper

Robert Carl "Butch" Wedin (born 22 November 1940 in Iron Mountain, Michigan) is an American former ski jumper who competed in the 1960 Winter Olympics.

Wedin was a member of the United States Ski Team from 1958 to 1964. During this time, he set two consecutive North American distance records of 294 and 312 feet, the latter winning him the national junior tournament in 1960. He was inducted into the Upper Peninsula Sports Hall of Fame in 1995 and the American Ski Jumping Hall of Fame in 2008. His son-in-law, Alois Lipburger, was also a ski jumper.
