= James L. Adams =

American politician

James Adams

Member of the Minnesota House of Representatives
- In office 1955–1974

Personal details
- Born: October 2, 1921 Iron Mountain, Michigan, U.S.
- Died: August 6, 2014 (aged 92) Minneapolis, Minnesota, U.S.
- Party: Democratic
- Education: Dunwoody College of Technology

Military service
- Branch/service: United States Army
- Battles/wars: World War II

James "Jim" L. Adams (October 2, 1921 – August 6, 2014) was an American politician who served as a member of the Minnesota House of Representatives from 1955 to 1974.

== Background ==
Born in Iron Mountain, Michigan, Adams moved to Minneapolis, Minnesota as a child. He served in the United States Army Corps of Engineers during World War II and later attended the Dunwoody College of Technology. Adams worked as an electrician. Adams then served in the Minnesota House of Representatives from 1955 to 1974 as a Democrat.

He died in Minneapolis, Minnesota.
