= John Biolo =

American football player (1916–2003)

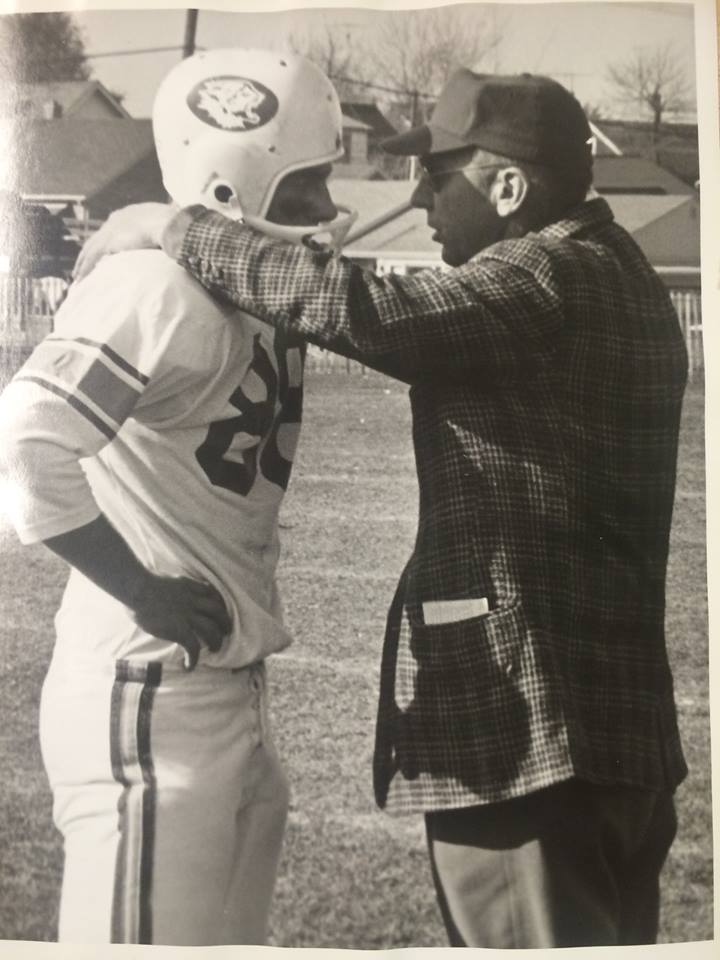
- Biolo Sr. (right) coaches Green Bay West high school football

Personal information
- Born: February 8, 1916; Iron Mountain, Michigan, U.S.
- Died: February 4, 2003 (aged 86); Fond du Lac, Wisconsin, U.S.
- Listed height: 5 ft 10 in (1.78 m)
- Listed weight: 191 lb (87 kg)

Career information
- High school: Iron Mountain (MI)
- College: Lake Forest
- NFL draft: 1939: undrafted

Career history
- Green Bay Packers (1939)

Awards and highlights
- NFL champion (1939)
- Stats at Pro Football Reference

John Robert Biolo Sr. (February 8, 1916 – February 4, 2003) was an American professional football player who was a guard in the National Football League (NFL) and American Football League (AFL).

== Biography ==
Biolo was born on February 8, 1916, in Iron Mountain, Michigan. Biolo died on February 4, 2003, in Fond du Lac, Wisconsin. Biolo was married to Joan Florence who proceeded him in death in 1979. He was a father to 6 children and 22 grandchildren.

== Career ==
Biolo attended Lake Forest College (1935–38) and lettered in baseball and football. Biolo captained the undefeated 1938 football team and was named a Little All American. Biolo is enshrined in the Lake Forest Athletic Hall of Fame. Biolo was a member of the NFL Champion Green Bay Packers during the 1939 NFL season. Later in life, John was president of the Packers Alumni Association and served as a referee for Packers practices.

Biolo continued on as a Player / Coach in the American Football League with the Kenosha Cardinals in 1940 and 1941, and briefly with the Milwaukee Chiefs in 1941. Biolo joined the US Navy in 1941 and was commissioned an officer. Biolo flew anti-sub patrols in the canal zone and received carrier qualification for fighter-bombers in preparation for the projected invasion of Japan. Biolo eventually attained the rank of Lieutenant.

After the war, Biolo taught and coached at St. Norbert College in De Pere, Wisconsin.

In 1951, he moved to West High School in Green Bay, Wisconsin and served as Assistant Principal and Head Football Coach, leading his teams to four straight undefeated seasons. Named the Fox Valley Conference Coach of the Year five times, he led several teams to the Wisconsin Championships in football and track and eventually became principal of the school. He was selected to the All Upper Peninsula Hall of Fame and the Wisconsin State Coaches Hall of Fame. Elected to six years on the WIAA Advisory Council, which oversees high school athletics in Wisconsin, he also served as president of the council. He continued to educate in his retirement, each year teaching students the changes in the tax laws for tax preparation season.
