= Millie Hill bat cave =

Bat colony in Iron Mountain, Michigan

Millie Hill Bat Cave Viewing Area
- Interactive map of Millie Hill Bat Cave Viewing Area
- Location: Millie Hill Bat Cave Road
- Nearest city: Iron Mountain, Michigan
- Coordinates: 45°49′16.02″N 88°3′22.12″W

Millie Hill bat cave (also known as Millie Mine bat cave) is an abandoned iron mine in Iron Mountain, Michigan that is now one of the largest bat breeding colonies in North America. The vertical mine shaft is blocked by a steel grate, which prevents entry by humans but allows bats to enter and exit freely. The bat cave is designated as an official Michigan Wildlife Viewing Area.

== History ==
The Millie Hill mine was excavated in the 1860s. It was abandoned around the turn of the 20th century.

As a teenager, spelunker Steve Smith explored the abandoned Millie Mine in the 1970s and found thousands bats below the surface. The city of Iron Mountain planned to fill the mine in the spring of 1993, but Smith contacted Bat Conservation International to save the bats and their home in the mine. The entrance was reinforced with concrete and covered with an 8 ft (2.4 m) tall steel cage with bars wide enough for bats to fly in and out. The cage was designed by U.P. Engineers and Architects Inc. The sides are constructed in a way to prevent predators such as cats, weasels, and raccoons from sitting on the bars to snatch the bats as they exit.

== Conservation ==
An estimated 250,000 to one million bats winter in the Millie Mine cave. At the time of its construction, the Millie Hill bat cave was the second largest hibernaculum in the United States. Over 1,000 former mines in the United States have been converted to bat sanctuaries since 1994. Mines must meet the right requirements to be a suitable habitat for hibernating bats, stable temperatures that are cool but above freezing (approximately 38–48 °F (3–9 °C)) with a high humidity. Different species have different preferences; for example, the little brown bat prefers the warmer interior of the mine, while big brown bats can tolerate colder temperatures near the entrance.

Bats in the Upper Peninsula region have also historically roosted in thick trunks of hollow trees such as the white pine, but this habitat has also been impacted by humans.

Bats in the Millie Mine have been affected by white-nose syndrome, a fungus that grows on them while they hibernate during winter. From 2014 to 2020, 90% of bats in Michigan's Upper Peninsula have died, including species of little brown bats, northern long eared bats, big brown bats, tri-colored bats, and Indiana bats. In 1994, approximately 85% of the species at Millie Hill were little brown bats.

== Wildlife viewing ==
The cave was the site of the first Great Lakes Bat Festival on August 9–11, 2002 to demonstrate tagging and educate the public on bats.

Bats are easiest to see in spring (April and May) and autumn (September to October) at dusk. Benches are available around the fence for viewers. There are also hiking trails.

The site is listed as an official Michigan Wildlife Viewing Area. The site is also listed on the Michigan DNR Townships with Bat HCP Habitats. Sierra Club recommended it as a place to see bats in the Upper Peninsula.
