= Ford Airport (Iron Mountain) =

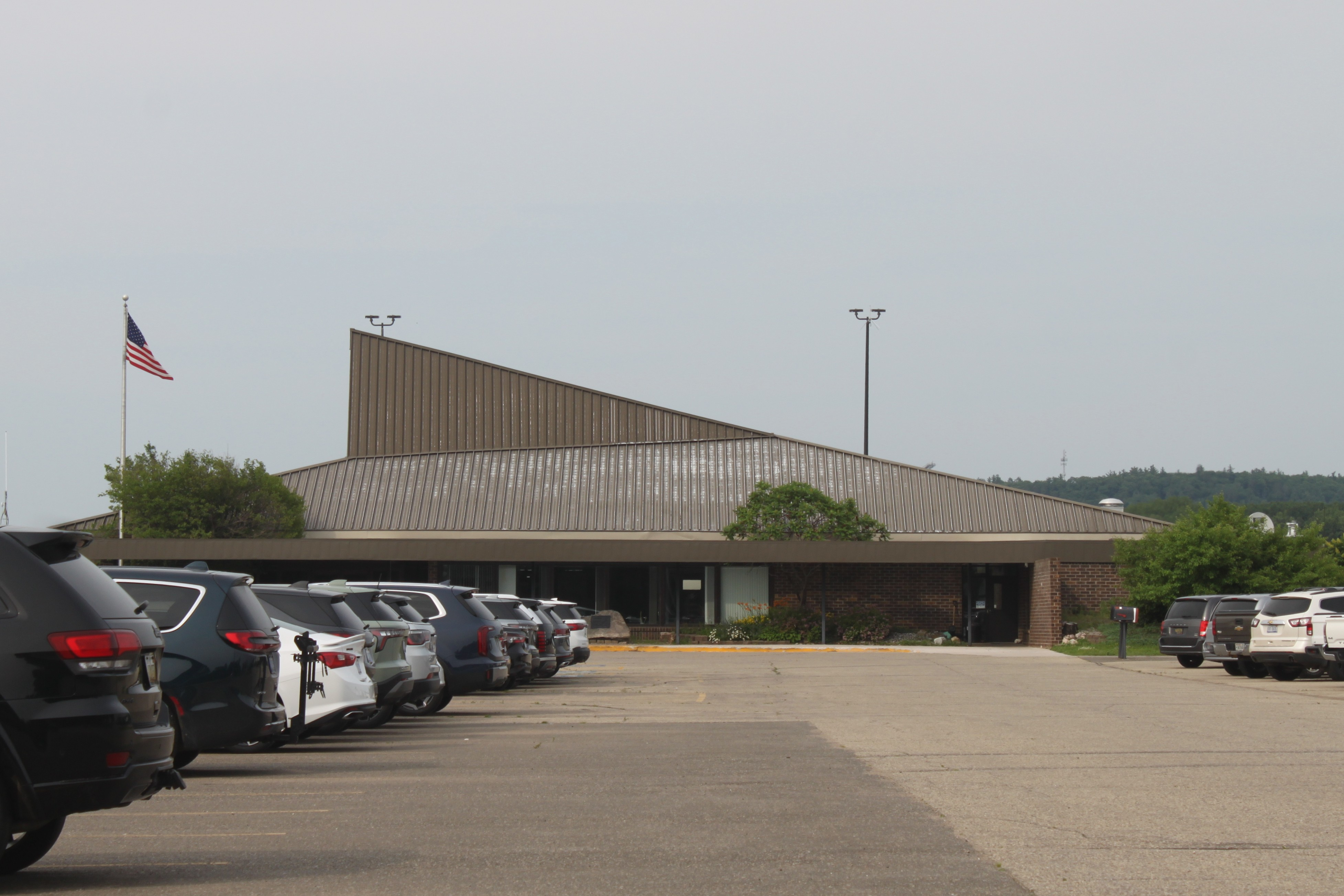
- IATA: IMT; ICAO: KIMT; FAA LID: IMT

Summary
- Airport type: Public
- Owner: Dickinson County
- Serves: Iron Mountain / Kingsford, Michigan
- Opened: April 1940
- Hub for: CSA Air
- Elevation AMSL: 1,182 ft (360 m)
- Coordinates: 45°49′06″N 088°06′52″W
- Website: fordairport.org

Map
- Location of airport in Michigan IMT (the United States)

Runways
Direction	Length		Surface
Direction	ft	m	Surface
1/19	6,502	1,982	Asphalt
13/31	3,810	1,161	Asphalt

Statistics (12 months ending August 2026 ^{except where noted})
- Passenger volume: 41,190
- Departing passengers: 20,320
- Scheduled flights: 950
- Cargo (lb.): 451k
- Aircraft operations (2022): 6,966
- Based aircraft (2023): 36
- Sources: Ford Airport, FAA, BTS

Ford Airport (IATA: IMT, ICAO: KIMT, FAA LID: IMT) is a county-owned public-use airport in Dickinson County, Michigan, United States. It is located three miles west of the central business district of Iron Mountain, in the central Upper Peninsula of Michigan. The airport offers scheduled passenger service by one commercial airline, SkyWest Airlines, an affiliate of Delta Connection, which is subsidized by the Essential Air Service program. It is also a hub for FedEx Feeder operator CSA Air.

Ford Airport serves the greater Dickinson County area, which includes the cities of Iron Mountain, Kingsford and Norway in Michigan and the bordering Wisconsin communities of Aurora, Florence and Niagara. Its service area also includes portions of Iron and Menominee counties in Michigan and Florence and Marinette counties in Wisconsin.

It is included in the Federal Aviation Administration (FAA) National Plan of Integrated Airport Systems for 2021–2025, in which it is categorized as a non-hub primary commercial service facility.

The Experimental Aircraft Association (EAA) hosts events for community members, most notably Ford Airport Days. They often feature restored warbirds like B-25 Mitchell bombers and A-26 Invaders. The event also gives people the opportunity to fly drones, hosts tributes to veterans, and develops interest in aviation among youth.

The airport received $1,000,000 from the US Department of Transportation in 2020 as part of the CARES Act to help it mitigate the effects of the COVID-19 pandemic.

== Facilities and aircraft ==
Ford Airport covers an area of 720 acres (291 ha) at an elevation of 1,182.0 feet (360.3 m). It has two asphalt paved runways: the primary runway 1/19 is 6,502 by 150 feet and the crosswind runway 13/31 is 3,810 by 75 feet. Runway 1/19 has approved ILS, GPS and LOC/DME approaches. In addition, the Iron Mountain VOR/DME (IMT) navigational facility is located at the field.

In 2022, Dickinson County started considering a renovation of the terminal at Ford in hopes to hosting larger aircraft. A consultant was hired to help the airport plan.

For the 12-month period ending December 31, 2022, the airport had 6,966 aircraft operations, an average of 19 per day: 62% air taxi, 21% commercial service and 17% general aviation. In November 2023, there were 36 aircraft based at this airport: 22 single-engine, 8 multi-engine, 5 jet and 1 helicopter.

Both based and transient general aviation aircraft are supported by the fixed-base operator (FBO) Kubick Aviation Services, which offers aviation fuel, aircraft parking and hangars, aircraft rental, courtesy cars, pilot lounges, snooze rooms, and more.

Ford Airport enhances regional air travel safety by maintaining an Aircraft Rescue and Firefighting (ARFF) 'Index A' trained team and related equipment.

== Airline and destinations ==
=== Passenger ===
Airlines	Destinations
Delta Connection	Detroit, Minneapolis/St. Paul

Destinations map
Destinations from Ford Airport
Red = Year-round destination
Green = Seasonal destination
Blue = Future destination

=== Top destinations ===
Busiest routes out of IMT (September 2025 – August 2026)
Rank	City	Passengers	Carrier
1	Minneapolis/St Paul, Minnesota	10,170	Delta Connection
2	Detroit, Michigan	10,150	Delta Connection

== Accidents and incidents ==
- On July 27, 1965, a Beechcraft 65 Queen Air crashed while attempting to land at Iron Mountain. The crew voluntarily shut down one engine to simulate a failure, but the aircraft had insufficient speed to maintain flight and crashed short of the runway. Both occupants received minor injuries.
- On July 3, 1974, a Beechcraft Model 18 crashed on approach to Iron Mountain. The pilot encountered poor visibility on approach and descended to look for the runway when he struck a bank. Factors contributing to the crash were a failure to initiate a go-around, an incorrect altimeter setting, runway misalignment, and weather worse than forecasted.
- On October 17, 1974, a Beechcraft Model 18 impacted terrain short of the runway while attempting to land. The pilot descended below the Minimum Descent Altitude on an instrument approach. The sole pilot on board was killed. The aircraft was operated by the same company as the Model 18 that crashed earlier in the year.
- On August 3, 2021, a Cessna 172 Skyhawk was substantially damaged by the jet blast of a Bombardier CRJ-200 parked nearby. The Skyhawk passed 200 feet behind the jet while mechanics increased engine power for a maintenance test. The blast from the jet lifted the 172's tail, resulting in substantial damage to the left wing and strut.

== See also ==
- List of airports in Michigan

== Other sources ==
- Essential Air Service documents (Docket Number OST-1999-5175) from the U.S. Department of Transportation:
  - 2005-5-14 Order Selecting Carrier and Setting Final Subsidy Rate
  - Order 2007-3-21 Selecting Carrier and Setting Final Subsidy Rates
  - 2008-1-13 Order Selecting Carrier, Setting Final Subsidy Rates and Requesting Proposals
  - 2008-8-14 Order Reselecting Carrier and Setting Final Subsidy Rates
  - 2010-6-4 Order Re-Selecting Carrier, Setting Final Subsidy Rates and Requesting Proposals
  - 2011-11-30 Order Selecting Carrier
