= Organization for Bat Conservation =

American environmentalist non-profit organization

- Formation: 1992
- Dissolved: 2018; 8 years ago
- Tax ID no.: 38-3417021
- Legal status: 501(c)3
- Purpose: Environmentalism, Conservation
- Location: Bloomfield Hills, Michigan
- Origins: Bloomfield Hills, Michigan
- Region served: Worldwide
- Key people: Executive Director: Rob Mies (1992–2018)

Organization for Bat Conservation (OBC) was a national environmental education nonprofit based in Bloomfield Hills, Michigan, established to educate and inspire people to save bats. It was the largest grassroots bat conservation organization in the United States. In February 2018, it was announced that the organization was ceasing operations due to unexpected financial problems and personnel changes.

== History ==
Founded in 1992, OBC was a leading environmental educator focused on bats. Its home base was at the Cranbrook Institute of Science in Bloomfield Hills, Michigan, where OBC operated the Bat Zone, a live animal center with approximately 200 animals including bats from around the world and other nocturnal animals. Each year, thousands of visitors came to the Bat Zone to attend tours and participate in live animal educational programs. OBC educators traveled throughout the country to present education programs to children and adults at schools, festivals, museums, science and nature centers each year.

OBC attained non-profit status in August 1997.

=== Great Lakes Bat Festival ===
OBC also organized and participated in several special events. The Annual Great Lakes Bat Festival, started in 2002, was created to celebrate the role of bats in the Great Lakes ecosystem as insect eaters, while dispelling misconceptions that generate fears and threaten bats and their habitats around the world. The goal of the festival is to help people understand the impact to natural ecosystems and human economies should bat populations continue to decline.

=== National Conservation Campaign ===
In September 2014, OBC launched a new public action campaign called Save the Bats. Save the Bats is aimed at preventing the decline of bat populations. Save the Bats encourages people to take local action to conserve bats, including installing bat houses, planting wildlife gardens, and teaching others about the importance of bats. The campaign has many celebrity, government agency and corporate supporters.

In addition, OBC and Warner Brothers Entertainment worked together on the set of Batman v Superman: Dawn of Justice to re-purpose parts of the movie set into bat houses. Director Zack Snyder contacted OBC when he heard about bats dying off from white-nose syndrome and enlisted Rob Mies, OBC Executive Director, to assist in the bat house design and construction. More than 150 bat houses were made on the movie set in Pontiac, some of which were painted and signed by Snyder, Amy Adams, and Ben Affleck. The bat houses were auctioned off to support the Save the Bats campaign. Warner Brothers released a short PSA documenting the bat house build featuring Affleck encouraging people to join the campaign. To date, more than 1,000,000 people have viewed the video.

=== Property acquisition ===
In August 2017, Organization for Bat Conservation purchased the mineral rights for Magazine Mine, a silica mine in southern Illinois. Magazine Mine is one of the largest Indiana bat hibernacula in the world.

After 15 years at the Cranbrook Institute of Science in Bloomfield Hills, OBC moved the Bat Zone to a larger location in Pontiac in June 2017. The 10,000 square foot building used to be a First Federal Bank, on west Huron Street near Woodward Avenue.

== Dissolution ==
Rob Mies was removed from his position as Executive Director of OBC in February 2018. Shortly after his dismissal, OBC announced that it would cease operation due to unexpected financial struggles. Mies disagreed with the decision to dissolve OBC and called for the resignation of its board members to save the organization.

61 animals were transferred to the Detroit Zoo, and the organization worked with other institutions to find homes for over 200 animals.

== Collaborative worldwide conservation projects ==
=== North America ===
- Supporting White-Nose Fungus research
- Reducing wind farm mortality
- Bat house habitation success
- Land surveys for public and private land owner to identify roosts for protection
- Providing bat education seminars at Michigan Nature Centers funded by bat conservation grants from Critter Catchers, Inc.

=== Africa ===
- Protection on Mauritius Island regarding the Mauritian flying fox
- Education on the Island of Rodrigues regarding the Rodrigues flying fox
- Protection of the golden bat

=== Asia ===
- Teacher training workshops in Malaysia.

=== Australia ===
- Rescue project of the Australian spectacled flying fox
