= Gospel Opportunities Radio Network =

Christian FM radio network in Michigan, United States

- WHWL: Marquette, Michigan; WEUL: Kingsford, Michigan; WHWG: Trout Lake, Michigan; United States
- Frequencies: WHWL: 95.7 MHz; WEUL: 98.1 MHz; WHWG: 89.9 MHz

Programming
- Format: Religious broadcasting; Christian Talk and Music
- Affiliations: SRN News

Ownership
- Owner: Gospel Opportunities, Inc.

History
- First air date: WHWL: April 1976; WEUL: 1990; WHWG: 1999
- Call sign meaning: WHWL: Witnessing His Wonderful Love; WHWG: similar to WHWL

Technical information
- Facility ID: WHWL: 24688; WEUL: 24690; WHWG: 90578
- Class: WHWL: C1; WEUL: A; WHWG: A
- ERP: WHWL: 100,000 watts; WEUL: 1,000 watts; WHWG: 1,000 watts
- HAAT: WHWL: 162 meters; WEUL: 135 meters; WHWG: 119 meters
- Translator: See § Translators

Links
- Webcast: Listen Live
- Website: whwl.net

Gospel Opportunities Radio Network is a group of non-commercial Christian FM radio stations based in Marquette, Michigan, with stations throughout Michigan's Upper Peninsula, along with a translator in Mackinaw City, Michigan. Gospel Opportunities, Inc. was formed in 1975.

Its first station WHWL went on air in April 1976. WHWL is a Christian station that broadcasts Bible teaching programs and traditional, conservative music. Their station manager, Andy Larsen, has held the position since 2016 when he took over for the late Curt Marker. The station usually has 8-10 on-air radio personalities.

== Stations ==
The main station of the Gospel Opportunities Radio Network is WHWL, based in Marquette, Michigan. It operates on 95.7 MHz with 100,000 watts. The station has four full-power repeater stations:

- WEUL began operation in 1990. It is licensed to Kingsford, Michigan and operates on 98.1 MHz with 1,000 watts.
- WHWG, began operation in July 1999. It is licensed to Trout Lake, Michigan and operates on 89.9 MHz with 1,000 watts. Upon launching, WHWG was the first Christian radio station serving the Sault Ste. Marie – Newberry radio market as it replaced translator W293AG on 106.5.
- WHWT 89.9 MHz in Ironwood, Michigan signed on in 2024 and WHWM 88.5 MHz in Rockland, Michigan signed on in 2025.

=== Translators ===
WHWL also has 10 translator stations of its own:

Broadcast translators for WHWL
Call sign	Frequency	City of license	FID	FCC info
W216BF	91.1 FM	Manistique, Michigan	24693	LMS
W224AV	92.7 FM	Covington, Michigan	78612	LMS
W224AW	92.7 FM	Bergland, Michigan	81125	LMS
W251AE	98.1 FM	Victoria, Michigan	24692	LMS
W259AD	99.7 FM	Newberry, Michigan	77188	LMS
W260AC	99.9 FM	Houghton, Michigan	24691	LMS
W261CI	100.1 FM	Escanaba, Michigan	24689	LMS
W271AG	102.1 FM	Mackinaw City, Michigan	84015	LMS
W277AG	103.3 FM	Sault Ste. Marie, Michigan	81117	LMS
W280DD	103.9 FM	Ironwood, Michigan	81372	LMS

== Expansion ==
The network was granted a construction permit at 88.5 MHz for Rockland, Michigan facility WHWM, which would force a frequency change for existing class D station (WOAS) licensed to the Ontonagon Area School District and operated by students at Ontonagon High School.
