= Kingsford, Michigan =

- City
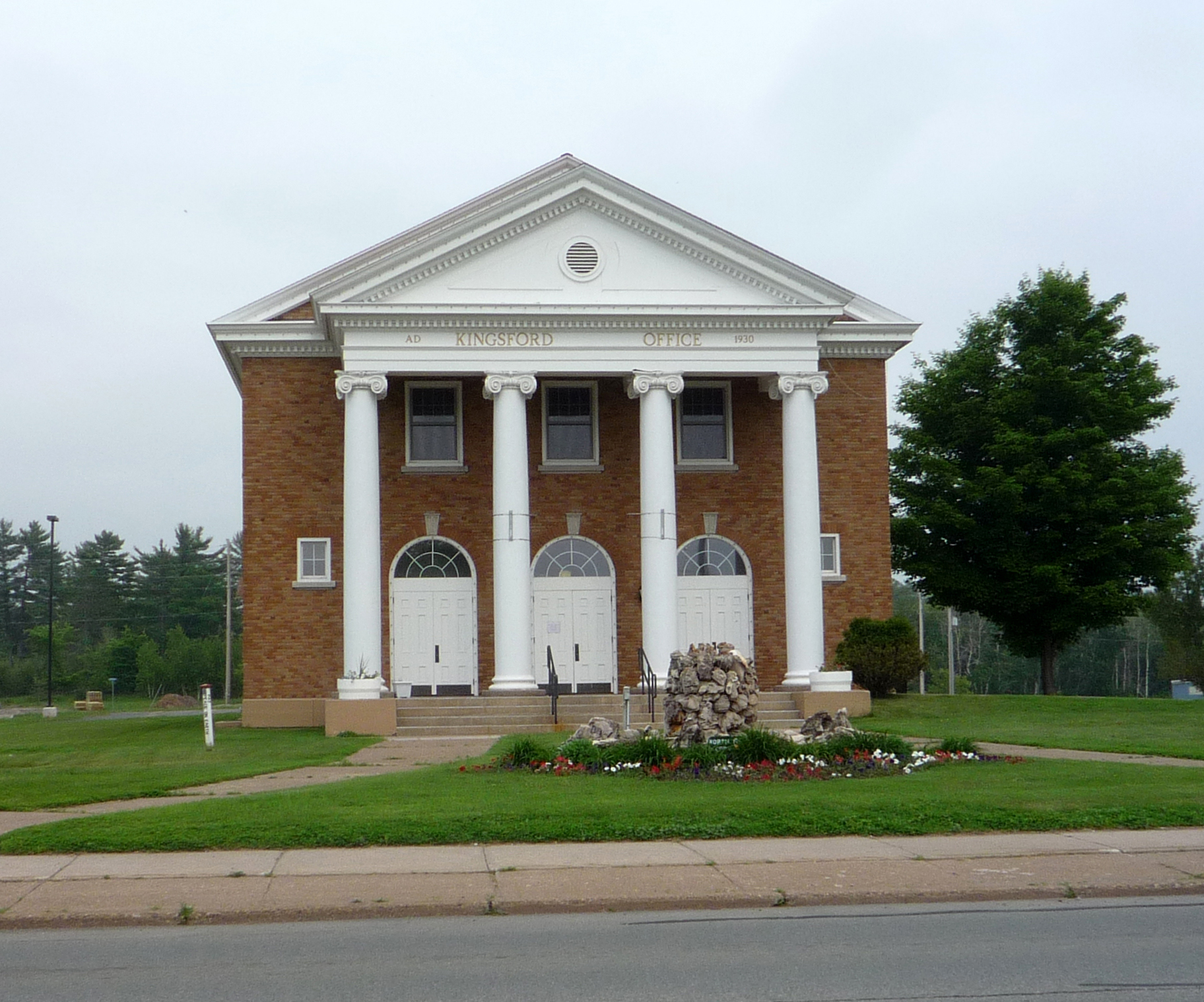
- Kingsford City Hall (2009)

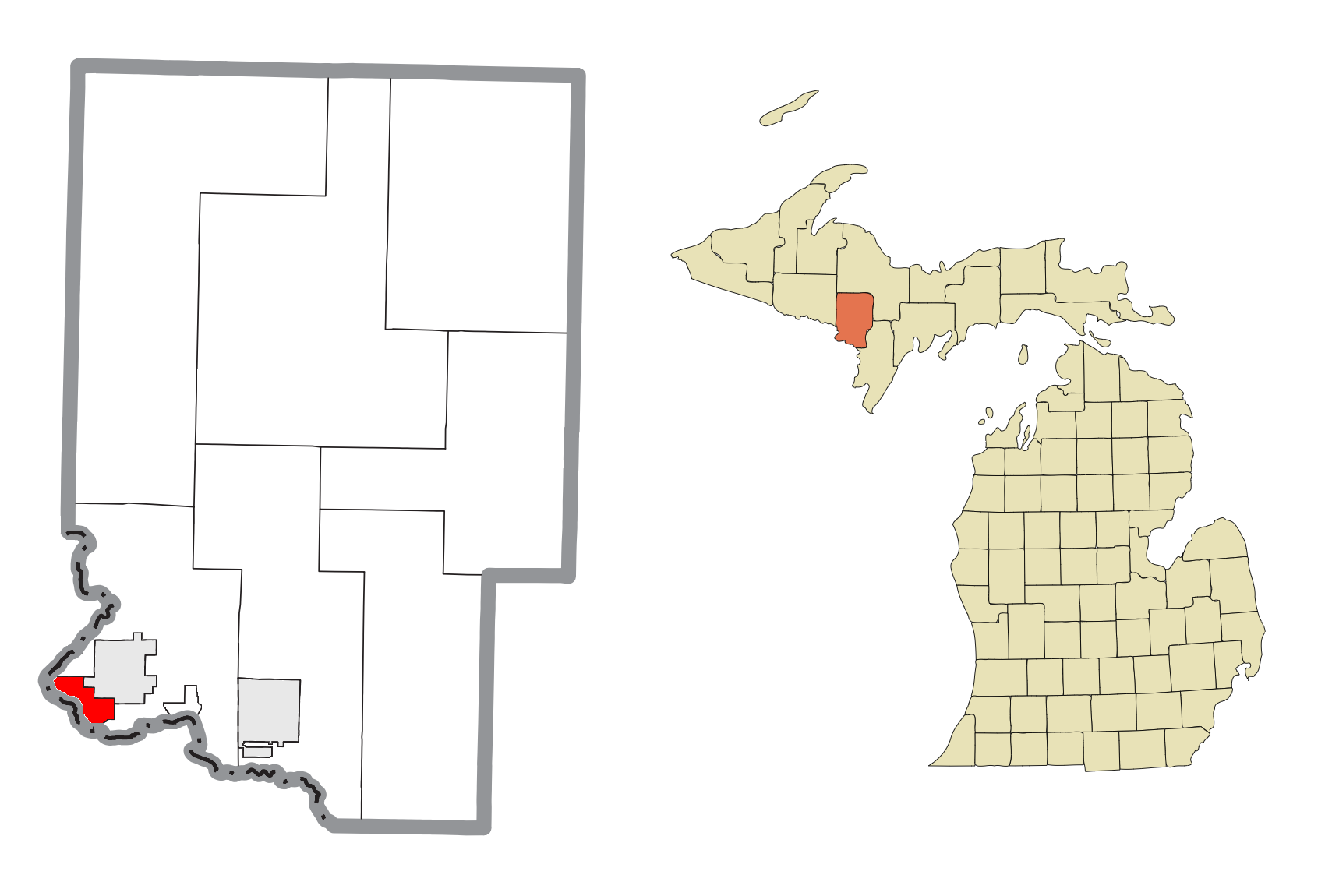
- Location within Dickinson County

- Location within the state of Michigan Location within the United States
- Coordinates: 45°48′12″N 88°05′05″W
- Country: United States
- State: Michigan
- County: Dickinson
- Incorporated: 1924 (village); 1947 (city)

Government
  - Type: Mayor–council
  - Mayor: Joseph Groeneveld
  - Manager: Michael Stelmaszek

Area
  - Total: 4.58 sq mi (11.85 km^{2})
  - Land: 4.32 sq mi (11.19 km^{2})
  - Water: 0.25 sq mi (0.66 km^{2})
- Elevation: 1,099 ft (335 m)

Population (2020)
  - Total: 5,139
  - Density: 1,189.58/sq mi (459.30/km^{2})
- Time zone: UTC-6 (Central (CST))
  - Summer (DST): UTC-5 (CDT)
- ZIP code(s): 49801, 49802
- Area code: 906
- FIPS code: 26-43300
- GNIS feature ID: 0629722
- Website: Official website

Kingsford is a city in Dickinson County, Michigan, United States. Its population was 5,139 at the 2020 census, a slight increase from the 5,133 recorded at the 2010 census. It was named for the developer Edward G. Kingsford.

== Geography ==
Kingsford is located at 45°47′40″N 88°04′36.09″W

According to the United States Census Bureau, the city has a total area of 4.58 square miles (11.86 km^{2}), of which, 4.32 square miles (11.19 km^{2}) is land and 0.26 square miles (0.67 km^{2}) is water.

=== Climate ===
This climatic region is typified by large seasonal temperature differences, with warm to hot (and often humid) summers and cold (sometimes severely cold) winters. According to the Köppen Climate Classification system, Kingsford has a humid continental climate, abbreviated "Dfb" on climate maps.

== Demographics ==
Historical population
Census	Pop.	Note	%±
1930	5,526		—
1940	5,771		4.4%
1950	5,038		−12.7%
1960	5,084		0.9%
1970	5,276		3.8%
1980	5,290		0.3%
1990	5,480		3.6%
2000	5,549		1.3%
2010	5,133		−7.5%
2020	5,139		0.1%
U.S. Decennial Census

Kingsford is part of the Iron Mountain Micropolitan Statistical Area.

=== 2020 census ===
As of the 2020 census, Kingsford had a population of 5,139. The median age was 46.5 years. 19.2% of residents were under the age of 18 and 24.5% of residents were 65 years of age or older. For every 100 females there were 92.5 males, and for every 100 females age 18 and over there were 90.1 males age 18 and over.

94.7% of residents lived in urban areas, while 5.3% lived in rural areas.

There were 2,276 households in Kingsford, of which 24.4% had children under the age of 18 living in them. Of all households, 42.4% were married-couple households, 21.2% were households with a male householder and no spouse or partner present, and 28.4% were households with a female householder and no spouse or partner present. About 34.9% of all households were made up of individuals and 16.0% had someone living alone who was 65 years of age or older.

There were 2,466 housing units, of which 7.7% were vacant. The homeowner vacancy rate was 2.1% and the rental vacancy rate was 7.6%.

Racial composition as of the 2020 census
Race	Number	Percent
White	4,781	93.0%
Black or African American	25	0.5%
American Indian and Alaska Native	21	0.4%
Asian	32	0.6%
Native Hawaiian and Other Pacific Islander	0	0.0%
Some other race	30	0.6%
Two or more races	250	4.9%
Hispanic or Latino (of any race)	94	1.8%

=== 2010 census ===
As of the census of 2010, there were 5,133 people, 2,224 households, and 1,357 families residing in the city. The population density was 1,188.2 inhabitants per square mile (458.8/km^{2}). There were 2,414 housing units at an average density of 558.8 per square mile (215.8/km^{2}). The racial makeup of the city was 97.2% White, 0.4% African American, 0.4% Native American, 0.5% Asian, 0.2% from other races, and 1.2% from two or more races. Hispanic or Latino of any race were 1.1% of the population.

There were 2,224 households, of which 28.0% had children under the age of 18 living with them, 44.9% were married couples living together, 11.7% had a female householder with no husband present, 4.4% had a male householder with no wife present, and 39.0% were non-families. 33.4% of all households were made up of individuals, and 14.2% had someone living alone who was 65 years of age or older. The average household size was 2.22 and the average family size was 2.81.

The median age in the city was 44 years. 21.7% of residents were under the age of 18; 7.3% were between the ages of 18 and 24; 22.3% were from 25 to 44; 27.8% were from 45 to 64; and 20.7% were 65 years of age or older. The gender makeup of the city was 46.6% male and 53.4% female.

=== 2000 census ===
As of the census of 2000, there were 5,549 people, 2,352 households, and 1,498 families residing in the city. The population density was 1,286.2 inhabitants per square mile (496.6/km^{2}). There were 2,477 housing units at an average density of 574.1 per square mile (221.7/km^{2}). The racial makeup of the city was 97.84% White, 0.22% African American, 0.49% Native American, 0.32% Asian, 0.02% Pacific Islander, 0.02% from other races, and 1.10% from two or more races. Hispanic or Latino of any race were 0.54% of the population. 18.6% were of German, 15.9% Italian, 12.7% Swedish, 8.2% English, 7.8% French and 5.8% Polish ancestry according to Census 2000.

There were 2,352 households, out of which 31.4% had children under the age of 18 living with them, 50.6% were married couples living together, 10.6% had a female householder with no husband present, and 36.3% were non-families. 32.5% of all households were made up of individuals, and 17.2% had someone living alone who was 65 years of age or older. The average household size was 2.28 and the average family size was 2.87.

In the city, the population was spread out, with 25.3% under the age of 18, 5.7% from 18 to 24, 27.7% from 25 to 44, 21.0% from 45 to 64, and 20.3% who were 65 years of age or older. The median age was 40 years. For every 100 females, there were 90.0 males. For every 100 females age 18 and over, there were 85.4 males.

The median income for a household in the city was $33,165, and the median income for a family was $41,283. Males had a median income of $34,280 versus $22,455 for females. The per capita income for the city was $17,615. About 9.2% of families and 10.4% of the population were below the poverty line, including 15.7% of those under age 18 and 5.8% of those age 65 or over.

== Economy ==
Some of Kingsford's main sources of work are Grede Foundries and a nearby paper mill, which is located between Kingsford and Norway.

The neighboring city, Iron Mountain, is home to Pine Mountain Ski Resort, containing one of the largest ski jumps in the world, the Pine Mountain Ski Jump. The ski resort hosts the annual FIS Ski Jumping Continental Cup. This site formerly hosted The International Ski Jump Championship, and currently holds The National Ski Jump Championship every February.

Kingsford was the site of a Ford Motor Company factory which built wooden station wagon bodies beginning in 1931. During World War II, Ford built a glider factory which manufactured 4190 wooden frame Waco CG-4 gliders for the US military. Scrap wood from the Ford factory was used to make charcoal. That operation was the foundation of the Kingsford Charcoal company.

== Recreation ==
Activities include camping, hiking, fishing, hunting, snowmobile trails and a number of different water activities.

Kingsford borders the Menominee River which divides Kingsford from Aurora, Florence County, Wisconsin.

Pine Mountain Ski Lodge and Ski Hill are located in Breitung Township, Michigan which is part of Dickinson County. Kingsford also has the only airport in the area, the Ford Airport, which serviced the World War II Ford Glider factory.

Kingsford has its own Public Safety Department which includes the Police and Fire Departments as well as its own City Council.

City infrastructure includes city-pumped well water and its own filtration waste plant.

== Infrastructure ==
=== Highways ===
M-95 connects with US 2 and US 141 just a mile or so north in Iron Mountain. The road crosses the Menominee River into Wisconsin where it continues as County Road N in Florence County.

- US 2
- US 141
- M-95

=== Airport ===
Ford Airport (Iron Mountain) (KIMT) serves Kingsford, the county and surrounding communities with both scheduled commercial jet service and general aviation services. The airport is a hub for CSA Air cargo operations.
