= Iron Mountain, Michigan =

- City
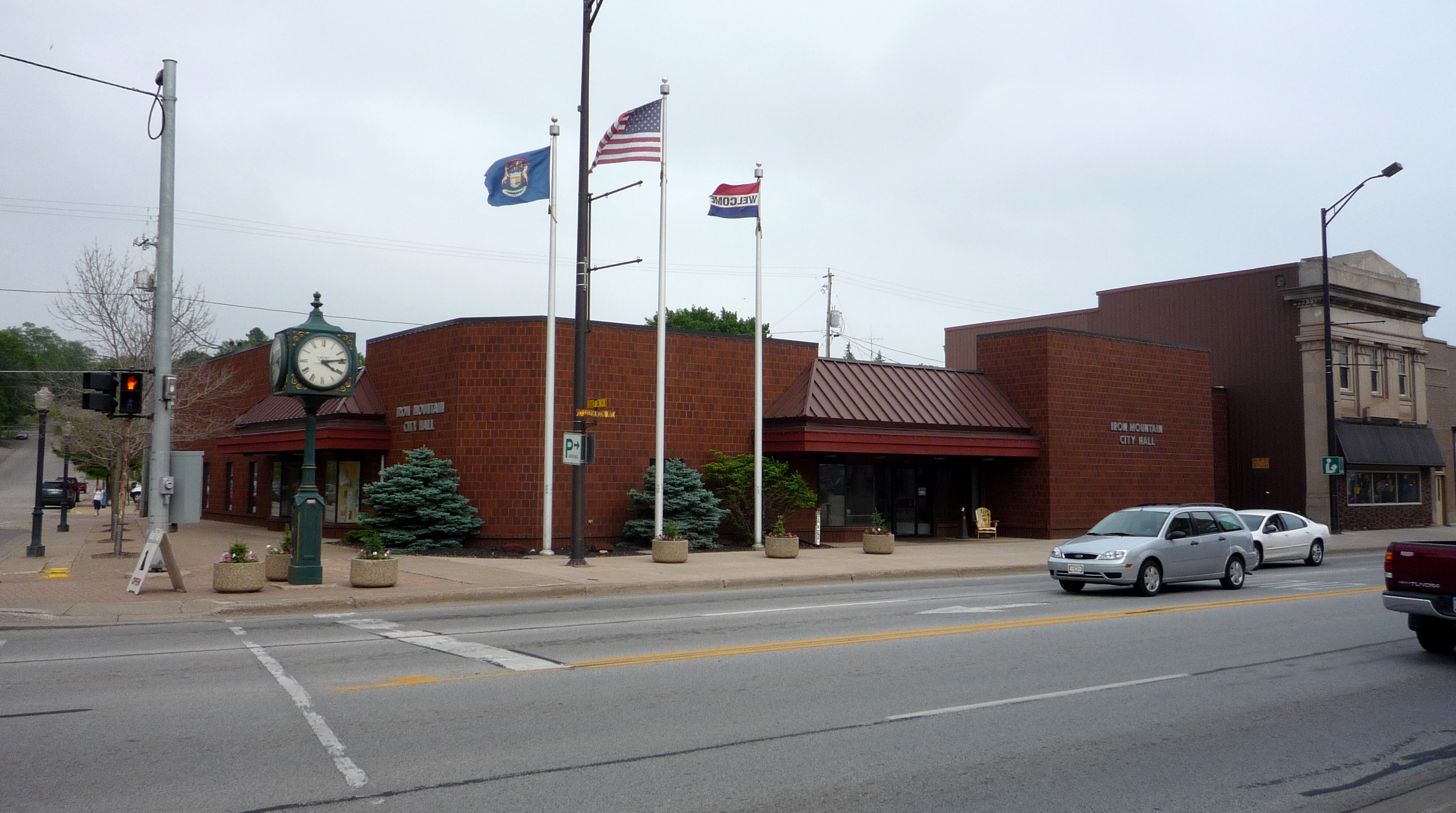
- Iron Mountain City Hall
- Interactive map of Iron Mountain, Michigan
- Location within Michigan Location within the United States
- Coordinates: 45°49′21″N 88°03′51″W
- Country: United States
- State: Michigan
- County: Dickinson
- Settled: 1878; 148 years ago
- Incorporated: 1887; 139 years ago (village); 1889; 137 years ago (city)

Government
  - Type: Council–manager
  - Mayor: Dale Alessandrini
  - Manager: Jordan Stanchina

Area
  - Total: 8.21 sq mi (21.27 km^{2})
  - Land: 7.54 sq mi (19.53 km^{2})
  - Water: 0.67 sq mi (1.73 km^{2})
- Elevation: 1,138 ft (347 m)

Population (2020)
  - Total: 7,518
  - Density: 997.08/sq mi (384.97/km^{2})
- Time zone: UTC-6 (Central (CST))
  - Summer (DST): UTC-5 (CDT)
- ZIP code(s): 49801, 49802, 49831
- Area code: 906
- FIPS code: 26-40960
- GNIS feature ID: 0629079
- Website: Official website

Iron Mountain is a city in and the county seat of Dickinson County, Michigan, United States. The population was 7,518 at the 2020 census, down from 7,624 at the 2010 census. Located in the Upper Peninsula of Michigan, Iron Mountain was named for the valuable iron ore found in the vicinity. Iron Mountain is the principal city of the Iron Mountain micropolitan area, which includes all of Dickinson County and Florence County, Wisconsin.

Iron Mountain hosts a few points of interest such as the Millie Hill bat cave and the Chapin Mine Steam Pump Engine, and is located adjacent to the Pine Mountain Jump, one of the largest artificial ski jumps in the world. It shares Woodward Avenue with the neighboring town, Kingsford. In addition, Iron Mountain is known for its pasties, bocce ball tournaments, and World Cup ski jumps. Iron Mountain was also named a "Michigan Main Street" community by Michigan governor Jennifer Granholm in 2006. It is one of only thirteen such communities in the state of Michigan in 2008. It is also the hometown of Michigan State University men's basketball coach Tom Izzo and former NFL head coach Steve Mariucci.

== Geography ==
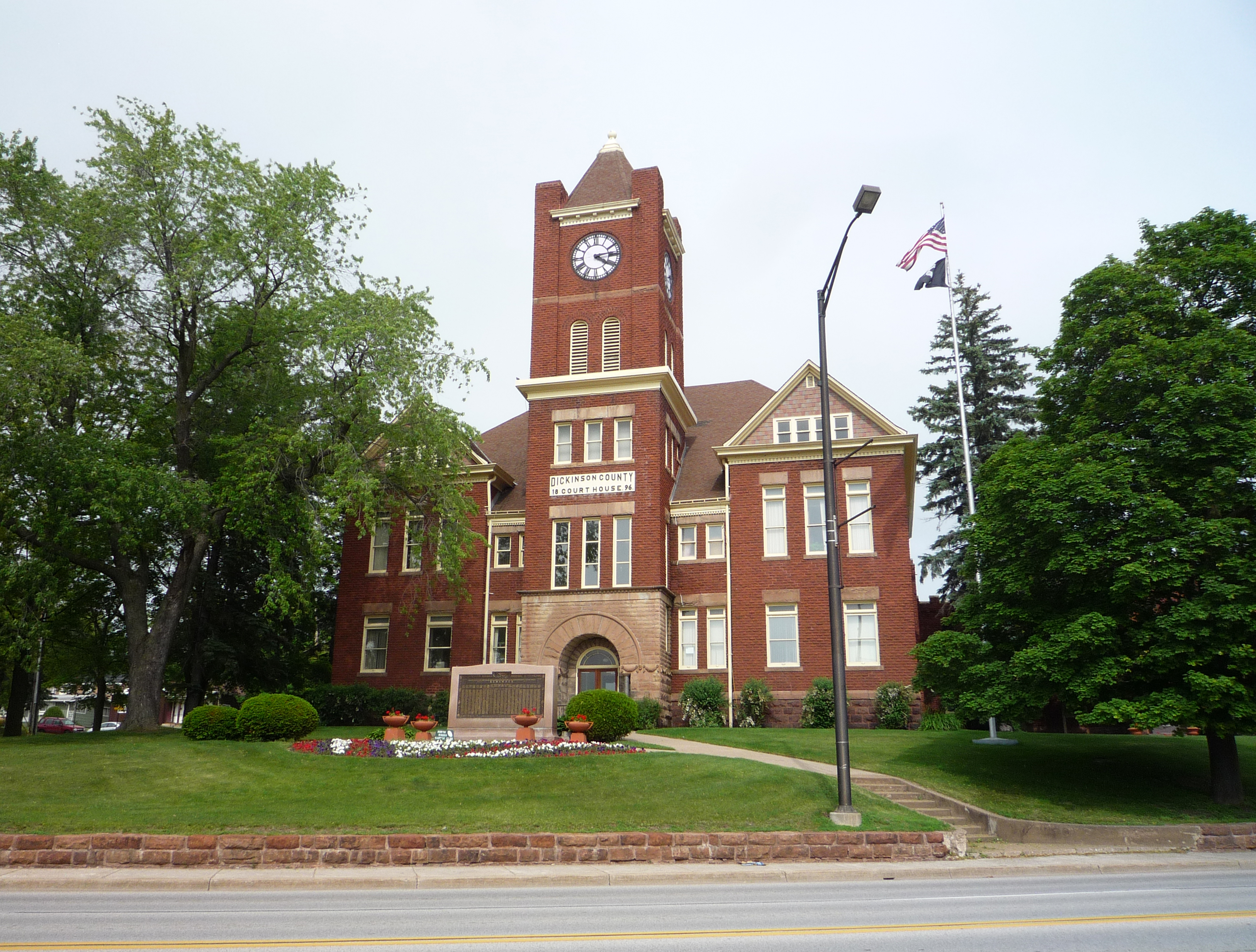
Dickinson County Courthouse and Jail, listed on the National Register of Historic Places.

According to the United States Census Bureau, the city has a total area of 8.04 square miles (20.82 km^{2}), of which, 7.37 square miles (19.09 km^{2}) of it is land and 0.67 square miles (1.74 km^{2}) is water.

=== Climate ===
This climatic region is typified by large seasonal temperature differences, with warm to hot (and often humid) summers and cold (sometimes severely cold) winters. According to the Köppen Climate Classification system, Iron Mountain has a humid continental climate, abbreviated "Dfb" on climate maps.

Climate data for Iron Mountain WWTP, Michigan (1991–2020 normals, extremes 1899–present)
| Month | Jan | Feb | Mar | Apr | May | Jun | Jul | Aug | Sep | Oct | Nov | Dec | Year |
|---|---|---|---|---|---|---|---|---|---|---|---|---|---|
| Record high °F (°C) | 57 (14) | 62 (17) | 82 (28) | 94 (34) | 100 (38) | 100 (38) | 104 (40) | 101 (38) | 98 (37) | 88 (31) | 77 (25) | 64 (18) | 104 (40) |
| Mean maximum °F (°C) | 41.4 (5.2) | 48.0 (8.9) | 61.5 (16.4) | 74.8 (23.8) | 85.3 (29.6) | 90.8 (32.7) | 91.3 (32.9) | 89.7 (32.1) | 85.3 (29.6) | 77.2 (25.1) | 59.4 (15.2) | 46.1 (7.8) | 93.7 (34.3) |
| Mean daily maximum °F (°C) | 24.0 (−4.4) | 28.3 (−2.1) | 39.2 (4.0) | 51.9 (11.1) | 66.4 (19.1) | 76.0 (24.4) | 80.4 (26.9) | 78.3 (25.7) | 70.1 (21.2) | 55.7 (13.2) | 40.8 (4.9) | 29.0 (−1.7) | 53.3 (11.8) |
| Daily mean °F (°C) | 14.2 (−9.9) | 17.2 (−8.2) | 28.0 (−2.2) | 40.5 (4.7) | 54.1 (12.3) | 64.0 (17.8) | 68.5 (20.3) | 66.7 (19.3) | 58.6 (14.8) | 45.3 (7.4) | 32.5 (0.3) | 20.9 (−6.2) | 42.5 (5.8) |
| Mean daily minimum °F (°C) | 4.4 (−15.3) | 6.1 (−14.4) | 16.9 (−8.4) | 29.0 (−1.7) | 41.7 (5.4) | 52.0 (11.1) | 56.6 (13.7) | 55.1 (12.8) | 47.0 (8.3) | 34.9 (1.6) | 24.2 (−4.3) | 12.8 (−10.7) | 31.7 (−0.2) |
| Mean minimum °F (°C) | −16.9 (−27.2) | −16.1 (−26.7) | −6.9 (−21.6) | 14.1 (−9.9) | 27.0 (−2.8) | 37.0 (2.8) | 44.5 (6.9) | 42.4 (5.8) | 32.0 (0.0) | 22.1 (−5.5) | 8.0 (−13.3) | −8.4 (−22.4) | −20.8 (−29.3) |
| Record low °F (°C) | −35 (−37) | −39 (−39) | −27 (−33) | −6 (−21) | 16 (−9) | 24 (−4) | 35 (2) | 30 (−1) | 19 (−7) | 8 (−13) | −10 (−23) | −26 (−32) | −39 (−39) |
| Average precipitation inches (mm) | 1.36 (35) | 1.15 (29) | 1.68 (43) | 2.79 (71) | 3.48 (88) | 3.71 (94) | 3.41 (87) | 3.38 (86) | 3.60 (91) | 3.27 (83) | 1.90 (48) | 1.76 (45) | 31.49 (800) |
| Average snowfall inches (cm) | 14.7 (37) | 11.2 (28) | 8.9 (23) | 7.1 (18) | 0.2 (0.51) | 0.0 (0.0) | 0.0 (0.0) | 0.0 (0.0) | 0.0 (0.0) | 0.4 (1.0) | 5.5 (14) | 13.0 (33) | 61.0 (155) |
| Average extreme snow depth inches (cm) | 14.8 (38) | 17.9 (45) | 15.1 (38) | 6.1 (15) | 0.1 (0.25) | 0.0 (0.0) | 0.0 (0.0) | 0.0 (0.0) | 0.0 (0.0) | 0.5 (1.3) | 3.3 (8.4) | 9.2 (23) | 19.8 (50) |
| Average precipitation days (≥ 0.01 in) | 10.1 | 6.9 | 7.7 | 10.1 | 12.0 | 11.5 | 11.6 | 10.6 | 11.3 | 11.7 | 8.9 | 9.6 | 122.0 |
| Average snowy days (≥ 0.1 in) | 9.8 | 6.3 | 4.9 | 2.8 | 0.2 | 0.0 | 0.0 | 0.0 | 0.0 | 0.5 | 3.8 | 8.0 | 36.3 |
Source: NOAA

=== Environment ===
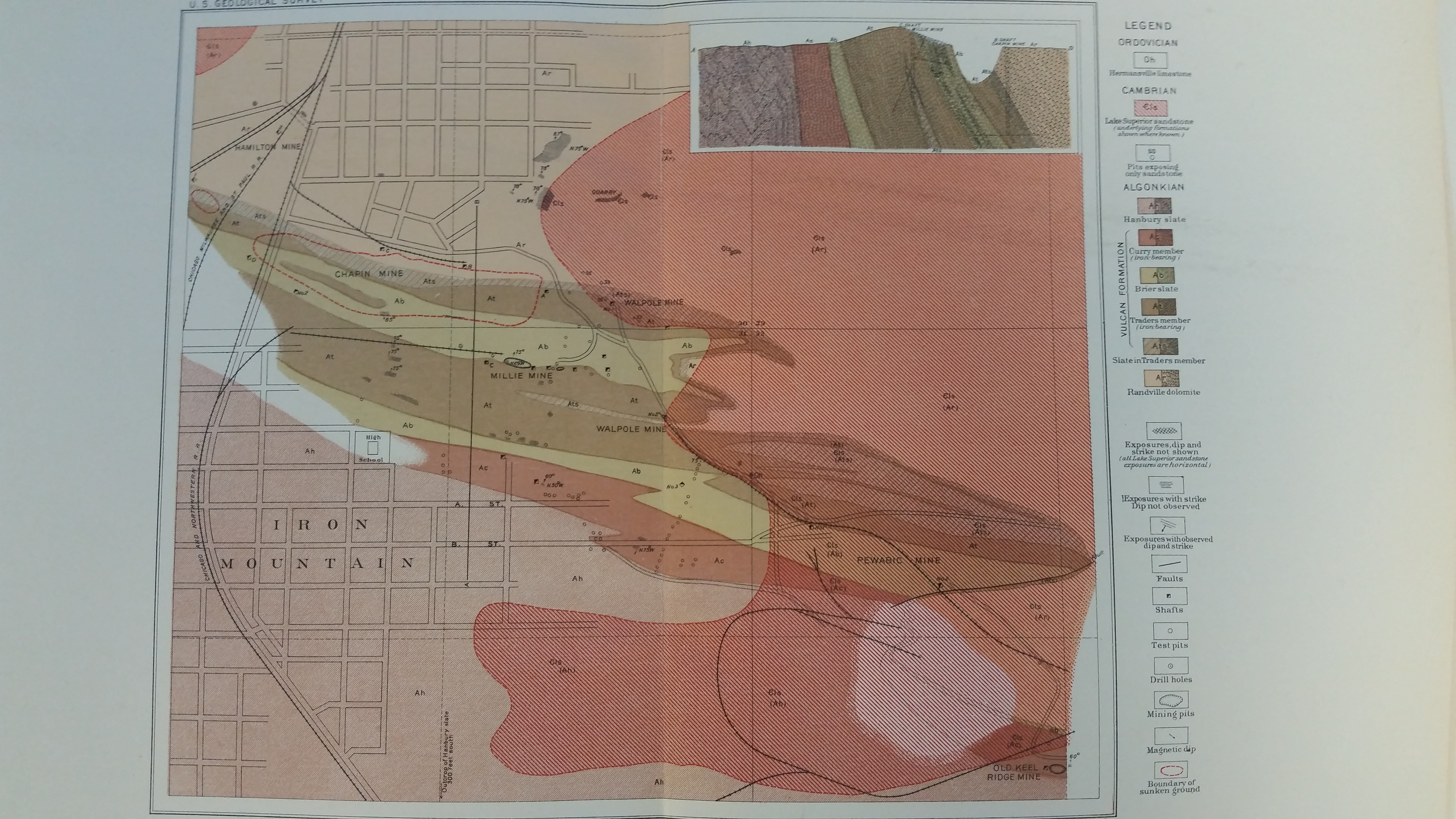
Geologic map of the Iron Mountain area

Iron Mountain's abandoned Millie Hill mine is home to one of the largest bat hibernacula in the Midwest. Roughly 25,000–50,000 bats make their winter home there. However, due to disease of bats in the midwest most of the colony has died.

Iron Mountain is located within the Menominee Iron-Bearing District, which covers southern Dickinson County and extends westward into Iron County. Iron ore was discovered in Dickinson County in 1849 and Iron County in 1851. Ore is produced from the middle Precambrian Vulcan Iron-Formation around Iron Mountain, and the Riverton Iron-Formation between Iron River, Michigan and Crystal Falls, Michigan. Both formations belong to the Marquette Range Supergroup. The Vulcan is between 300 and 800 feet thick and consists of hematite and magnetite with quartz, while the Riverton is 100–600 feet thick and consists of siderite and chert.

== Demographics ==
Historical population
| Census | Pop. | Note | %± |
|---|---|---|---|
| 1890 | 8,599 | | — |
| 1900 | 9,242 | | 7.5% |
| 1910 | 9,216 | | −0.3% |
| 1920 | 8,251 | | −10.5% |
| 1930 | 11,652 | | 41.2% |
| 1940 | 11,080 | | −4.9% |
| 1950 | 9,679 | | −12.6% |
| 1960 | 9,299 | | −3.9% |
| 1970 | 8,702 | | −6.4% |
| 1980 | 8,341 | | −4.1% |
| 1990 | 8,525 | | 2.2% |
| 2000 | 8,154 | | −4.4% |
| 2010 | 7,624 | | −6.5% |
| 2020 | 7,518 | | −1.4% |
U.S. Decennial Census

=== 2020 census ===
As of the 2020 census, Iron Mountain had a population of 7,518. The median age was 41.4 years. 21.3% of residents were under the age of 18 and 19.1% of residents were 65 years of age or older. For every 100 females there were 100.3 males, and for every 100 females age 18 and over there were 99.0 males age 18 and over.

92.2% of residents lived in urban areas, while 7.8% lived in rural areas.

There were 3,416 households in Iron Mountain, of which 25.2% had children under the age of 18 living in them. Of all households, 39.6% were married-couple households, 23.8% were households with a male householder and no spouse or partner present, and 28.0% were households with a female householder and no spouse or partner present. About 37.0% of all households were made up of individuals and 14.4% had someone living alone who was 65 years of age or older.

There were 3,795 housing units, of which 10.0% were vacant. The homeowner vacancy rate was 1.9% and the rental vacancy rate was 9.4%.

Racial composition as of the 2020 census
| Race | Number | Percent |
|---|---|---|
| White | 6,968 | 92.7% |
| Black or African American | 26 | 0.3% |
| American Indian and Alaska Native | 40 | 0.5% |
| Asian | 74 | 1.0% |
| Native Hawaiian and Other Pacific Islander | 4 | 0.1% |
| Some other race | 42 | 0.6% |
| Two or more races | 364 | 4.8% |
| Hispanic or Latino (of any race) | 188 | 2.5% |

=== 2010 census ===
As of the 2010 census, there were 7,624 people, 3,362 households, and 2,025 families residing in the city. The population density was 1,034.5 inhabitants per square mile (399.4/km^{2}). There were 3,784 housing units at an average density of 513.4 per square mile (198.2/km^{2}). The racial makeup of the city was 96.3% White, 0.5% African American, 0.6% Native American, 0.7% Asian, 0.3% from other races, and 1.7% from two or more races. Hispanic or Latino of any race were 1.6% of the population.

There were 3,362 households, of which 28.0% had children under the age of 18 living with them, 44.3% were married couples living together, 11.0% had a female householder with no husband present, 4.8% had a male householder with no wife present, and 39.8% were non-families. 34.2% of all households were made up of individuals, and 13.4% had someone living alone who was 65 years of age or older. The average household size was 2.21, and the average family size was 2.83.

The median age in the city was 42.4 years. 22.6% of residents were under the age of 18; 8% were between the ages of 18 and 24; 22.9% were from 25 to 44; 29.3% were from 45 to 64; and 17.2% were 65 years of age or older. The gender makeup of the city was 49.2% male and 50.8% female.

=== 2000 census ===
As of the 2000 census, there were 8,154 people, 3,458 households, and 2,147 families residing in the city. The population density was 1,132.6 inhabitants per square mile (437.3/km^{2}). There were 3,819 housing units at an average density of 530.5 per square mile (204.8/km^{2}). The racial makeup of the city was 97.67% White, 0.20% African American, 0.48% Native American, 0.66% Asian, 0.01% Pacific Islander, 0.23% from other races, and 0.75% from two or more races. Hispanic or Latino of any race were 1.07% of the population. 20.6% were of Italian, 14.0% German, 9.0% Swedish, 8.8% English, 8.8% French, 5.8% Finnish and 5.5% Irish ancestry. 97.2% spoke English and 1.4% Italian as their first language.

There were 3,458 households, out of which 30.0% had children under the age of 18 living with them, 48.8% were married couples living together, 9.6% had a female householder with no husband present, and 37.9% were non-families. 33.3% of all households were made up of individuals, and 16.2% had someone living alone who was 65 years of age or older. The average household size was 2.29 and the average family size was 2.94.

In the city, the population was spread out, with 25.1% under the age of 18, 7.1% from 18 to 24, 27.2% from 25 to 44, 21.1% from 45 to 64, and 19.6% who were 65 years of age or older. The median age was 39 years. For every 100 females, there were 96.4 males. The ratio of males to females aged 18 and over was 90.6 for every 100 females.

The median income for a household in the city was $32,526, and the median income for a family was $43,687. Males had a median income of $38,309 versus $22,533 for females. The per capita income for the city was $19,918. About 9.4% of families and 10.6% of the total population were below the poverty line, including 13.5% of individuals under age 18 and 10.5% of individuals age 65 or over.

== Government ==
The current mayor is Dale Alessandrini. In 2023, the city, its police department, and several police officers were sued for sexual harassment.

== Media ==
The newspaper of record in Dickinson County is The Daily News.

Iron Mountain is included in the Marquette television market, NBC affiliate WLUC operates a local news bureau covering the city and neighboring areas. Due to distance from the transmitters and topography in the region terrestrial television signals are very limited in the area with the strongest signal coming from Wisconsin Public Television translator station W30DZ originating from Fence, WI.

Historically Iron Mountain was served by full power station WDHS which intermittently carried a religious format between long periods of silence, translators of various stations originating from Green Bay, and a handful of encrypted cable channels broadcast over the air.

=== Radio ===
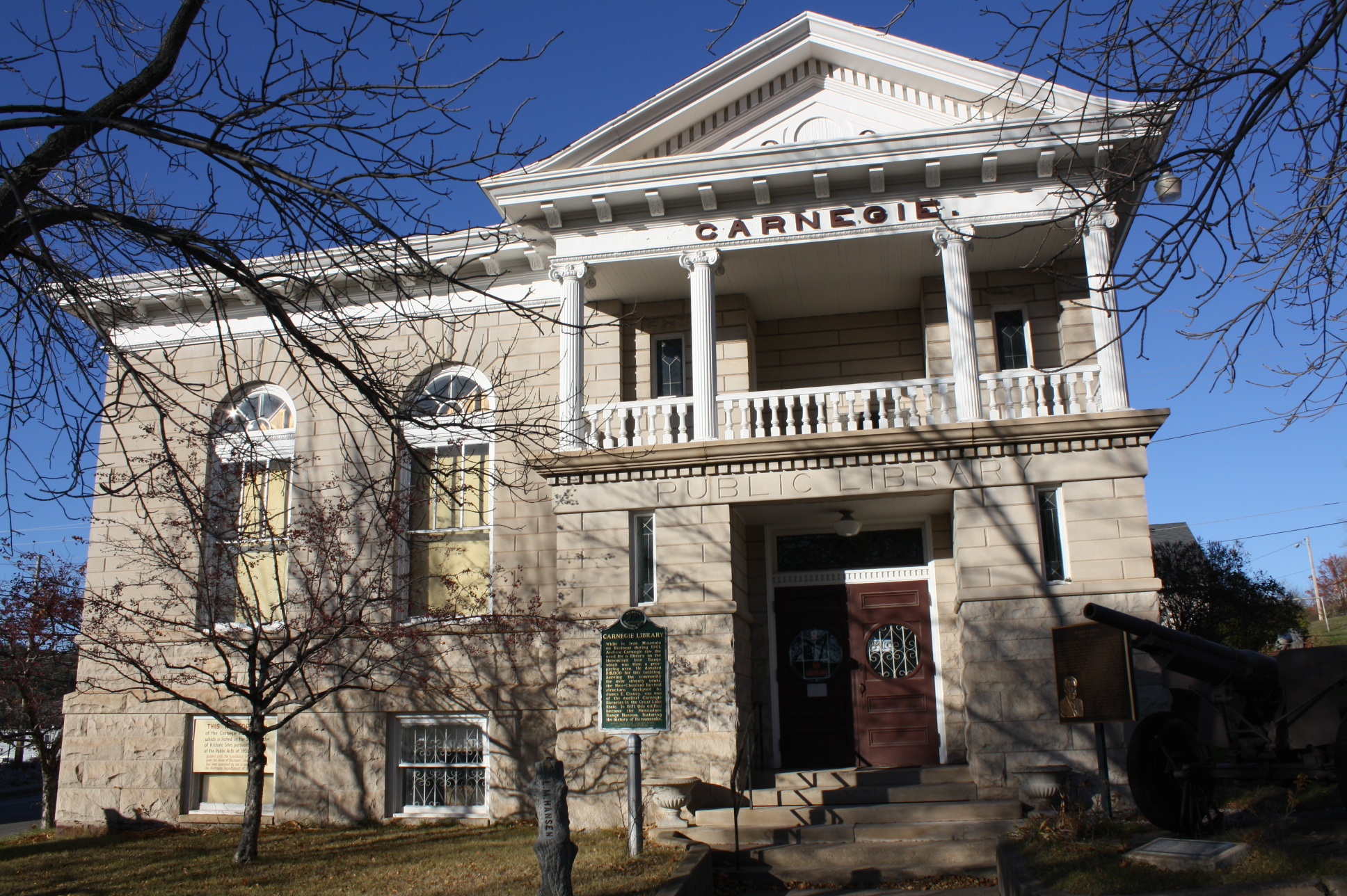
Carnegie library

Radio stations that are located within listening range of Iron Mountain include:

- WNMU-FM: 90.1 FM, Northern Michigan University in Marquette, NPR
- WMVM-FM: 90.7 FM, Goodman, Wisconsin, and Iron Mountain, Gospel
- WVCM: 91.5 FM, Iron Mountain, Religious
- WIMK: 93.1 FM, Iron Mountain, Classic Rock
- WZNL: 94.3 FM, Norway, Adult Contemporary
- WEUL: 98.1 FM, Victoria, Religious
- WIKB-FM: 99.1 FM, Iron River, Oldies
- WOBE: 100.7 FM, Crystal Falls, Top 40/CHR
- WJNR-FM: 101.5 FM, Iron Mountain, Frog Country
- WGMV: 106.3 FM, Stephenson, Classic Country
- WHTO: 106.7 FM, Iron Mountain, 80s Rock
- WFER: 1230 AM, Iron River, Oldies
- WMIQ: 1450 AM, Iron Mountain, Talk

== Transportation ==
Indian Trails provides daily intercity bus service between St. Ignace and Ironwood, Michigan.

Major highways:

- US 2 runs east to Escanaba and west to Ironwood.
- US 141 merges with US 2 just east of the city and heads northward toward Crystal Falls; southbound it continues on to Green Bay, Wisconsin.
- M-95 connects with Kingsford just to the south and with M-69 east at Randville about 14 miles (23 km) north.

The Iron Mountain area is served by Ford Airport (airport code: KIMT). Commercial air travel is provided by SkyWest Airlines, providing jet service as Delta Connection. Located three miles west of the city, the airport handles approximately 7,600 operations per year, with roughly 27% commercial service, 57% air taxi and 16% general aviation. The airport has a 6,501 foot asphalt primary runway with approved ILS, GPS and NDB approaches (Runway 1-19) and a 3,808 foot asphalt crosswind runway (Runway 13-31).

Although there is currently no direct rail passenger service from the Iron Mountain depot Amtrak Thruway Bus Service connects to Marinette, Wisconsin.

== Notable people ==
Category:People from Iron Mountain, Michigan

- James L. Adams, member of the Minnesota House of Representatives
- Randy Awrey, 1975 DII National Champion football player at Northern Michigan University and current head football coach at Concordia University Chicago
- John Biolo, former NFL player for the Green Bay Packers
- Neno DaPrato, college All-American and professional football player
- Anna DeForge, American-Montenegrin basketball player
- Nita Englund, competed in the 2018 Winter Olympics
- Frosty Ferzacca, American football player and coach
- Robert J. Flaherty, filmmaker
- Walter Samuel Goodland, 31st governor of Wisconsin
- R. James Harvey, former congressman and federal judge
- Chad Hord, off-road racing driver
- John Hubley, four-time Academy Award-winning animated film director; graduated from Iron Mountain High School
- Tom Izzo, men's basketball head coach for Michigan State University since 1995
- Johnny Johnson, baseball player
- Beau LaFave, member of the Michigan House of Representatives
- Gordon Lund, baseball player
- Steve Mariucci, NFL Network analyst and former NFL head coach
- Thomas Lawrence Noa, Roman Catholic bishop
- Phillip Rahoi, member of the Michigan Legislature and mayor of Iron Mountain
- Gene Ronzani, former NFL head coach of the Green Bay Packers
- Delaney Schnell, American Olympic diver
- Larry Vargo, American football player
- Butch Wedin, competed in the 1960 Winter Olympics
- Albert J. Wilke, member of the Michigan Senate

== In popular culture ==
Iron Mountain is mentioned in the 2000 film Reindeer Games. At the start of the film the main character, Rudy Duncan, is shown serving time in a prison near the city.
