= List of television stations in Texas =

This is a list of broadcast television stations that are licensed in the U.S. state of Texas.

== Full-power ==
- Stations are arranged by media market served and channel position.

Full-power television stations in Texas
Media market	Station	Channel	Primary affiliation(s)	Notes	Refs
Abilene	KRBC-TV	9	NBC		
Abilene	KTXS-TV	12	ABC, The CW on 12.2	(Note: Licensed to Sweetwater, Texas.)	
Abilene	KXVA	15	Fox, MyNetworkTV on 15.2		
Abilene	KTAB-TV	32	CBS, Telemundo on 32.2		
Amarillo	KACV-TV	2	PBS		
Amarillo	KAMR-TV	4	NBC, MyNetworkTV on 4.2		
Amarillo	KVII-TV	7	ABC, The CW on 7.2		
Amarillo	KFDA-TV	10	CBS, Telemundo on 10.3		
Amarillo	KCIT	14	Fox		
Amarillo	KEYU	31	Telemundo	(Note: Licensed to Borger, Texas.)	
Austin	KTBC	7	Fox		
Austin	KBVO	14	MyNetworkTV	(Note: Licensed to Llano, Texas.)	
Austin	KLRU	18	PBS		
Austin	KVUE	24	ABC, Estrella TV on 24.2		
Austin	KXAN-TV	36	NBC		
Austin	KEYE-TV	42	CBS, Telemundo on 42.2		
Austin	KNVA	54	The CW		
Austin	KAKW-DT	62	Univision, UniMás on 62.2	(Note: Licensed to Killeen, Texas.)	
Beaumont–Port Arthur	KBTV-TV	4	Dabl		
Beaumont–Port Arthur	KFDM	6	CBS, The CW on 6.2, Fox on 6.3		
Beaumont–Port Arthur	KBMT	12	ABC, NBC on 12.2		
Beaumont–Port Arthur	KGEW-LD	33	33.1 Telemundo, 33.2 Ion Plus, 33.3 Bounce TV, 33.4 Ion Mystery, 33.5 Daystar Español		
Beaumont–Port Arthur	KITU-TV	34	TBN		
Bryan–College Station	KBTX-TV	3	CBS, The CW on 3.2, Telemundo on 3.3		
Bryan–College Station	KAMU-TV	12	PBS	(Note: Licensed to College Station, Texas.)	
Bryan–College Station	KYLE-TV	28	MyNetworkTV, Fox on 28.2		
Corpus Christi	KIII	3	ABC		
Corpus Christi	KRIS-TV	6	NBC		
Corpus Christi	KZTV	10	CBS, Telemundo on 10.2, Independent on 10.3		
Corpus Christi	KEDT	16	PBS		
Corpus Christi	KORO	28	Univision		
Corpus Christi	KSCC	38	Fox, The CW and MyNetworkTV on 38.3		
Dallas–Fort Worth	KDTN	2	Daystar	(Note: Licensed to Denton, Texas.)	
Dallas–Fort Worth	KDFW	4	Fox, MyNetworkTV on 4.2		
Dallas–Fort Worth	KXAS-TV	5	NBC		
Dallas–Fort Worth	WFAA	8	ABC		
Dallas–Fort Worth	KTVT	11	CBS		
Dallas–Fort Worth	KERA-TV	13	PBS		
Dallas–Fort Worth	KTXA	21	Independent		
Dallas–Fort Worth	KUVN-DT	23	Univision	(Note: Licensed to Garland, Texas.)	
Dallas–Fort Worth	KDFI	27	MyNetworkTV, Fox on 27.4		
Dallas–Fort Worth	KFAA-TV	29	Independent, Estrella TV on 29.2, ABC on 8.8	(Note: Licensed to Decatur, Texas.)	
Dallas–Fort Worth	KDAF	33	The CW		
Dallas–Fort Worth	KXTX-TV	39	Telemundo, TeleXitos on 39.2		
Dallas–Fort Worth	KTXD-TV	47	Merit TV	(Note: Licensed to Greenville, Texas.)	
Dallas–Fort Worth	KSTR-DT	49	UniMas	(Note: Licensed to Irving, Texas.)	
Dallas–Fort Worth	KFWD	52	Shop LC		
Dallas–Fort Worth	KAZD	55	WEST	(Note: Licensed to Lake Dallas, Texas.)	
Dallas–Fort Worth	KDTX-TV	58	TBN		
Dallas–Fort Worth	KPXD-TV	68	Ion Television	(Note: Licensed to Arlington, Texas.)	
Del Rio	KYVV-TV	10	Grit		
Eagle Pass	KVAW	24	Independent		
El Paso	KDBC-TV	4	CBS, Roar and MyNetworkTV on 4.2		
El Paso	KVIA-TV	7	ABC, The CW on 7.2		
El Paso	KTSM-TV	9	NBC, Estrella TV on 9.2		
El Paso	KCOS	13	PBS		
El Paso	KFOX-TV	14	Fox		
El Paso	KINT-TV	26	Univision		
El Paso	KSCE	38	Life!		
El Paso	KTFN	65	UniMás		
Harlingen–Brownsville–McAllen	KGBT-TV	4	The CW, independent with MyNetworkTV on 4.2, Antenna TV on 4.4		
Harlingen–Brownsville–McAllen	KRGV-TV	5	ABC, Bilingual independent on 5.2	(Note: Licensed to Weslaco, Texas.)	
Harlingen–Brownsville–McAllen	KVEO-TV	23	NBC, CBS on 23.2	(Note: Licensed to Brownsville, Texas.)	
Harlingen–Brownsville–McAllen	KFXV	38	Fox		
Harlingen–Brownsville–McAllen	KTLM	40	Telemundo, TeleXitos on 40.2	(Note: Licensed to Rio Grande City, Texas.)	
Harlingen–Brownsville–McAllen	KLUJ-TV	44	TBN		
Harlingen–Brownsville–McAllen	KNVO	48	Univision, UniMás on 48.2, The CW on 48.4	(Note: Licensed to McAllen, Texas.)	
Houston	KPRC-TV	2	NBC		
Houston	KUHT	8	PBS		
Houston	KHOU	11	CBS		
Houston	KTRK-TV	13	ABC		
Houston	KETH-TV	14	TBN		
Houston	KTXH	20	MyNetworkTV		
Houston	KLTJ	22	Daystar	(Note: Licensed to Galveston, Texas.)	
Houston	KRIV	26	Fox		
Houston	KIAH	39	The CW		
Houston	KXLN-DT	45	Univision, UniMás on 45.2	(Note: Licensed to Rosenberg, Texas.)	
Houston	KTMD	47	Telemundo, TeleXitos on 47.2		
Houston	KPXB-TV	49	Ion Television	(Note: Licensed to Conroe, Texas.)	
Houston	KYAZ	51	MeTV	(Note: Licensed to Katy, Texas.)	
Houston	KTBU	55	Quest, CBS on 11.11		
Houston	KUBE-TV	57	ShopHQ	(Note: Licensed to Baytown, Texas.)	
Houston	KZJL	61	Estrella TV		
Houston	KFTH-DT	67	UniMás, Univision on 67.5	(Note: Licensed to Alvin, Texas.)	
Laredo	KGNS-TV	8	NBC, ABC on 8.2, Telemundo on 8.3		
Laredo	KLDO-TV	27	Univision		
Lubbock	KTTZ-TV	5	PBS		
Lubbock	KCBD	11	NBC		
Lubbock	KLBK-TV	13	CBS		
Lubbock	KPTB-DT	16	GLC		
Lubbock	KPCB-DT	17	GLC	(Note: Licensed to Snyder, Texas.) (Note: Satellite of KMLM-DT.)	
Lubbock	KLCW-TV	22	The CW, MyNetworkTV on 22.2		
Lubbock	KAMC	28	ABC		
Lubbock	KJTV-TV	34	Fox		
Midland–Odessa	KMID	2	ABC		
Midland–Odessa	KCWO-TV	4	The CW, Telemundo on 4.2	(Note: Licensed to Big Spring, Texas.)	
Midland–Odessa	KOSA-TV	7	CBS, The CW on 7.2, Telemundo on 7.3		
Midland–Odessa	KWES-TV	9	NBC		
Midland–Odessa	KUPB	18	Univision		
Midland–Odessa	KPEJ-TV	24	Fox, Estrella TV on 24.2		
Midland–Odessa	KWWT	30	MyNetworkTV		
Midland–Odessa	KPBT-TV	36	PBS		
Midland–Odessa	KMLM-DT	42	GLC		
San Angelo	KSAN-TV	3	NBC		
San Angelo	KIDY	6	Fox, MyNetworkTV on 6.2		
San Angelo	KLST	8	CBS		
San Antonio	KCWX	2	MyNetworkTV, Independent on 2.2 and 2.3	(Note: Licensed to Fredericksburg, Texas.)	
San Antonio	WOAI-TV	4	NBC, The CW on 4.2		
San Antonio	KENS	5	CBS, Estrella TV on 5.2		
San Antonio	KLRN	9	PBS		
San Antonio	KSAT-TV	12	ABC		
San Antonio	KNIC-DT	17	UniMás, Univision on 17.2	(Note: Licensed to Blanco, Texas.)	
San Antonio	KHCE-TV	23	TBN		
San Antonio	KPXL-TV	26	Ion Television	(Note: Licensed to Uvalde, Texas.)	
San Antonio	KABB	29	Fox		
San Antonio	KMYS	35	Dabl	(Note: Licensed to Kerrville, Texas.)	
San Antonio	KWEX-DT	41	Univision		
San Antonio	KVDA	60	Telemundo, TeleXitos on 60.2		
Sherman–Denison	KXII	12	CBS, MyNetworkTV on 12.2, Fox on 12.3		
Tyler–Kilgore-Longview	KLTV	7	ABC, Telemundo on 7.3		
Tyler–Kilgore-Longview	KTRE	9	ABC, Telemundo on 9.2	(Note: Licensed to Lufkin, Texas.) (Note: Semi-satellite of KLTV.)	
Tyler–Kilgore-Longview	KYTX	19	CBS, The CW on 19.2	(Note: Licensed to Nacogdoches, Texas.)	
Tyler–Kilgore-Longview	KFXK-TV	51	Fox, MyNetworkTV on 51.2	(Note: Licensed to Longview, Texas.)	
Tyler–Kilgore-Longview	KCEB	54	Infomercials		
Tyler–Kilgore-Longview	KETK-TV	56	NBC	(Note: Licensed to Jacksonville, Texas.)	
Victoria	KVCT	19	Fox, Telemundo on 19.2, The CW on 19.3		
Victoria	KAVU-TV	25	ABC, NBC on 25.2, CBS on 25.3		
Waco–Killeen–Temple	KCEN-TV	6	NBC	(Note: Licensed to Temple, Texas.)	
Waco–Killeen–Temple	KWTX-TV	10	CBS, Telemundo on 10.2		
Waco–Killeen–Temple	KXXV	25	ABC		
Waco–Killeen–Temple	KWKT-TV	44	Fox, MyNetworkTV on 44.2		
Waco–Killeen–Temple	KNCT	46	The CW	(Note: Licensed to Belton, Texas.)	
Wichita Falls	KFDX-TV	3	NBC, MyNetworkTV on 3.2, The CW on 3.3		
Wichita Falls	KAUZ-TV	6	CBS, The CW on 6.2		
Wichita Falls	KJTL	18	Fox		

== Low-power ==
Low-power television stations in Texas
Media market	Station	Channel	Network	Notes	Refs
Abilene	K18OA-D	10	[Blank]		
Abilene	KAOM-LD	14	[Blank]		
Abilene	KEOT-LD	31	[Blank]		
Abilene	KTES-LD	40	Roar		
Amarillo	KAUO-LD	15	Various		
Amarillo	KVAD-LD	16	Sonlife		
Amarillo	K17HI-D	17	3ABN		
Amarillo	KLKW-LD	22	Estrella		
Amarillo	KTXC-LD	35	[Blank]		
Amarillo	K24NR-D	45	[Blank]		
Amarillo	KXAD-LD	51	HSN		
Austin	KADT-LD	16	Daystar		
Austin	KVAT-LD	17	Various	(Note: Licensed to Garfield, Texas.)	
Austin	KGBS-CD	19	Various		
Austin	KADF-LD	20	Various		
Austin	K32OJ-D	29	Educational independent		
Austin	KMBA-LD	34	Various		
Beaumont–Port Arthur	K02RA-D	2	[Blank]		
Beaumont–Port Arthur	K10RT-D	10	[Blank]		
Beaumont–Port Arthur	KUIL-LD	12	MyNetworkTV on 12.5		
Beaumont–Port Arthur	K14TL-D	14	[Blank]		
Beaumont–Port Arthur	K20OM-D	15	3ABN		
Beaumont–Port Arthur	KJYK-LD	19	Telemundo		
Beaumont–Port Arthur	K34LK-D	20	3ABN		
Beaumont–Port Arthur	KUMY-LD	22	Various		
Beaumont–Port Arthur	KUMJ-LD	23	Various		
Beaumont–Port Arthur	KULC-LD	24	Various		
Beaumont–Port Arthur	KOPS-LD	50	Various		
Bryan–College Station	KLNL-LD	14	Independent		
Bryan–College Station	K03IJ-D	16	[Blank]		
Bryan–College Station	KAGS-LD	23	NBC		
Bryan–College Station	K28QN-D	29	Silent		
Bryan–College Station	K30QR-D	30	Silent		
Bryan–College Station	K35PH-D	35	Silent		
Bryan–College Station	K36LD-D	36	Silent		
Bryan–College Station	KRHD-CD	40	ABC		
Bryan–College Station	K20PC-D	40	Silent	(Note: Licensed to Centerville, Texas.)	
Corpus Christi	KLAO-LD	8	Silent		
Corpus Christi	KCCX-LD	24	Various		
Corpus Christi	K32OC-D	29	Various		
Corpus Christi	KQSY-LD	30	Various		
Corpus Christi	KYDF-LD	34	Various		
Corpus Christi	KCRP-CD	41	UniMás		
Corpus Christi	KXCC-LD	45	Various		
Corpus Christi	K22JA-D	47	Telemundo, Independent on 47.2		
Corpus Christi	K21OC-D	54	Various		
Dallas–Fort Worth	KLHP-LD	3	TCT		
Dallas–Fort Worth	KBFW-LD	6	Silent		
Dallas–Fort Worth	KZFW-LD	6	[Blank]		
Dallas–Fort Worth	K26KC-D	7	TBN		
Dallas–Fort Worth	K07AAF-D	9	HSN	(Note: Licensed to Corsicana, Texas.)	
Dallas–Fort Worth	KHFD-LD	16	Various		
Dallas–Fort Worth	KGSW-LD	18	Hope Channel	(Note: Licensed to Keene, Texas.)	
Dallas–Fort Worth	KPFW-LD	18	Various		
Dallas–Fort Worth	KBOP-LD	20	Various		
Dallas–Fort Worth	KNAV-LP	22	Various	(Note: Licensed to De Soto, Texas.)	
Dallas–Fort Worth	KNMW-LD	26	3ABN	(Note: Licensed to Mineral Wells, Texas.)	
Dallas–Fort Worth	KODF-LD	26	Various	(Note: Licensed to Mansfield, Texas.)	
Dallas–Fort Worth	KHPK-LD	28	Various		
Dallas–Fort Worth	K07AAD-D	31	Various		
Dallas–Fort Worth	KJJM-LD	34	Various		
Dallas–Fort Worth	KHFW-LD	35	Silent		
Dallas–Fort Worth	K11XN-D	40	IBN Television		
Dallas–Fort Worth	KXDA-LD	41	Religious independent		
Dallas–Fort Worth	K07AAE-D	43	Silent	(Note: Licensed to Lingleville, Texas.)	
Dallas–Fort Worth	KLEG-CD	44	Various		
Dallas–Fort Worth	KPTD-LP	51	Daystar Reflections	(Note: Licensed to Paris, Texas.)	
El Paso	K25OJ-D	25	Multimedios		
Harlingen–Brownsville–McAllen	KCWT-CD	21	The CW, PBS on 21.4	(Note: Licensed to La Feria, Texas.)	
Harlingen–Brownsville–McAllen	KJST-LD	28	Spanish-language independent		
Harlingen–Brownsville–McAllen	KTFV-CD	32	UniMás		
Harlingen–Brownsville–McAllen	KRZG-CD	35	Various		
Harlingen–Brownsville–McAllen	KAZH-LP	57	Various		
Harlingen–Brownsville–McAllen	KMBH-LD	67	Fox, The CW on 67.2		
Harlingen–Brownsville–McAllen	KSOY-LD	40	Telemundo 40		
Houston	KAHO-LD	4	Independent	(Note: Licensed to Woodville, Texas.)	
Houston	KTDJ-LD	5	Vida Vision	(Note: Licensed to Dayton, Texas.)	
Houston	KCVH-LD	6	Religious independent		
Houston	KUVM-LD	10	Various	(Note: Licensed to Missouri City, Texas.)	
Houston	KHLM-LD	12	CTN		
Houston	KVVV-LD	15	Various		
Houston	KVQT-LD	21	Various		
Houston	KQHO-LD	27	Various		
Houston	KUGB-CD	28	Various		
Houston	KHTX-LD	30	[Blank]	(Note: Licensed to Huntsville, Texas.)	
Houston	KEHO-LD	32	Various		
Houston	KUVM-CD	34	Various		
Houston	KZHO-LD	38	Religious independent		
Houston	KBMN-LD	40	Various		
Houston	KBPX-LD	46	Vida Vision		
Houston	KDHU-LD	50	Daystar		
Laredo	KXNU-LD	10	Telemundo, CBS on 10.2		
Laredo	KYLX-LD	13	CBS, The CW on 13.2		
Laredo	KLMV-LD	15	MeTV		
Laredo	K17OS-D	18	[Blank]		
Laredo	KTNR-LD	29	Religious independent		
Laredo	KXOF-CD	31	Fox		
Laredo	KETF-CD	39	UniMás		
Lubbock	KMYL-LD	14	MyNetworkTV		
Lubbock	K32OV-D	24	Various		
Lubbock	KLSO-LD	26	News		
Lubbock	KNKC-LD	29	Various		
Lubbock	KJTV-CD	32	Independent	(Note: Licensed to Wolfforth, Texas.)	
Lubbock	K13ZQ-D	40	Silent		
Lubbock	KABI-LD	42	Heroes & Icons		
Lubbock	KXTQ-CD	46	Telemundo, The CW on 46.2		
Lubbock	KLBB-LD	48	MeTV		
Lubbock	KBZO-LD	51	Univision		
Midland–Odessa	K06QA-D	6	[Blank]		
Midland–Odessa	K12XO-D	12	[Blank]		
Midland–Odessa	K17MP-D	17	3ABN		
Midland–Odessa	KTLE-LD	20	Telemundo		
Midland–Odessa	K21GU-D	21	[Blank]		
Midland–Odessa	KMDF-LD	22	365BLK		
Midland–Odessa	K36PZ-D	28	Silent		
Midland–Odessa	K29NW-D	29	[Blank]		
Midland–Odessa	KFAW-LD	32	Spanish-language independent		
Midland–Odessa	K34MX-D	34	Various		
Midland–Odessa	K35MF-D	35	Silent		
Midland–Odessa	K25QA-D	46	[Blank]		
San Angelo	KANG-LD	31	UniMás		
San Angelo	KEUS-LD	41	Univision, UniMás on 41.2		
San Antonio	KFLZ-LD	6	[Blank]		
San Antonio	KVHC-LD	11	Various		
San Antonio	KGSA-LD	16	Independent		
San Antonio	KOBS-LD	19	Various		
San Antonio	KRTX-LD	20	Various		
San Antonio	KGMM-CD	24	Various		
San Antonio	K25OB-D	27	Various		
San Antonio	KWTC-LD	27	IBN Television		
San Antonio	KSAA-LD	28	Various		
San Antonio	KVDF-CD	31	Various		
San Antonio	KISA-LD	40	Various		
San Antonio	KAXX-LD	42	[Blank]		
San Antonio	KQVE-LD	46	Daystar		
San Antonio	KSSJ-LD	47	Various		
San Antonio	K17MJ-D	51	Various		
Sherman–Denison	KAQI-LD	28	Telemundo, CBS on .2, Fox on .3		
Tyler–Kilgore-Longview	KNCD-LD	2	[Blank]		
Tyler–Kilgore-Longview	KLUF-LD	5	[Blank]		
Tyler–Kilgore-Longview	KTWC-LD	12	IBN Television on .2	(Note: Licensed to Crockett, Texas.)	
Tyler–Kilgore-Longview	KHTM-LD	13	[Blank]		
Tyler–Kilgore-Longview	KXXW-LD	13	Daystar on .2		
Tyler–Kilgore-Longview	KIVY-LD	16	Various		
Tyler–Kilgore-Longview	KQKT-LD	21	[Blank]		
Tyler–Kilgore-Longview	K25LG-D	25	3ABN		
Tyler–Kilgore-Longview	KDKJ-LD	27	Various		
Tyler–Kilgore-Longview	KBJE-LD	29	Various		
Tyler–Kilgore-Longview	KKPD-LD	30	Various		
Tyler–Kilgore-Longview	KPKN-LD	33	Various		
Tyler–Kilgore-Longview	K36QA-D	36	[Blank]		
Tyler–Kilgore-Longview	KLNM-LD	42	Independent		
Tyler–Kilgore-Longview	K24MO-D	46	[Blank]		
Tyler–Kilgore-Longview	KTPN-LD	48	MyNetworkTV		
Victoria	K03JE-D	3	[Blank]		
Victoria	KMOL-LD	17	NBC		
Victoria	KUNU-LD	21	Univision		
Victoria	K29OH-D	23	Silent	(Note: Licensed to Victoria, Texas.)	
Victoria	KQZY-LD	33	MeTV		
Victoria	K36ND-D	36	Silent		
Victoria	KXTS-LD	41	CBS		
Victoria	KVTX-LD	45	Telemundo		
Victoria	KVCV-LD	48	[Blank]		
Waco–Killeen–Temple	KPLE-CD	31	TCT		
Waco–Killeen–Temple	KZCZ-LD	34	Daystar		
Waco–Killeen–Temple	KAXW-LD	35	Various	(Note: Licensed to Mullin, Texas.)	
Wichita Falls	K20DN-D	20	Religious independent		
Wichita Falls	K24HH-D	24	Religious independent		
Wichita Falls	K30LD-D	30	The Family Channel		
Wichita Falls	KTWM-LD	49	[Blank]		

== Translators ==
Television station translators in Texas
Media market	Station	Channel	Translating	Notes	Refs
Abilene	KIDU-LD	17	KXVA	(Note: Licensed to Brownwood, Texas.)	
Abilene	KIDV-LD	34	KXVA	(Note: Licensed to Albany, Texas.)	
Abilene	KIDT-LD	44	KXVA	(Note: Licensed to Stamford, Texas.)	
Austin	KBVO-CD	14	KBVO		
Austin	KHPZ-CD	15	KNVA	(Note: Licensed to Round Rock, Texas.)	
Austin	KHPX-CD	28	KNVA	(Note: Licensed to Georgetown, Texas.)	
Austin	KTFO-CD	31	KAKW-DT		
Austin	KHPL-CD	40	KNVA	(Note: Licensed to La Grange, Texas.)	
Austin	KHPM-CD	40	KNVA	(Note: Licensed to San Marcos, Texas.)	
Austin	KXLK-CD	40	KAKW-DT		
Austin	KHPF-CD	44	KNVA		
Beaumont–Port Arthur	KVHP-LD	12	KBMT		
Beaumont–Port Arthur	KAOB-LD	27	KVQT-LD		
Bryan–College Station	K20KJ-D	20	KVQT-LD		
Bryan–College Station	KNXG-LD	27	KBTX-TV		
Childress	K21IR-D	2	KACV-TV		
Childress	K14QV-D	4	KAMR-TV		
Childress	K16LY-D	7	KVII-TV		
Childress	K23DE-D	7	KVII-TV		
Childress	K18MY-D	10	KFDA-TV		
Childress	K25CQ-D	14	KCIT		
Clarendon	K17DS-D	2	KACV-TV		
Clarendon	K29MZ-D	4	KAMR-TV		
Clarendon	K31OV-D	7	KVII-TV		
Clarendon	K33PX-D	10	KFDA-TV		
Clarendon	K27OG-D	14	KCIT		
Corpus Christi	K33QP-D	33	KVQT-LD		
Corpus Christi	K09YZ-D	47	K22JA-D	(Note: Licensed to Beeville, Texas.)	
Corpus Christi	K31KK-D	47	K22JA-D	(Note: Licensed to Kingsville and Alice, Texas.)	
Dallas–Fort Worth	KUVN-CD	23; 49.1	KUVN-DT; KSTR-DT		
Dallas–Fort Worth	K22NR-D	26	KNMW-LD	(Note: Licensed to Stephenville, Texas.)	
Harlingen–Brownsville–McAllen	KNWS-LP	64	KAZH-LP		
Harlingen–Brownsville–McAllen	KXFX-CD	67	KMBH-LD		
Houston	KCTL-LD	25	KTWC-LD	(Note: Licensed to Livingston, Texas.)	
Memphis	K24NK-D	4	KAMR-TV		
Memphis	K28OF-D	7	KVII-TV		
Memphis	K32EH-D	10	KFDA-TV		
Memphis	K34NQ-D	10	KFDA-TV		
Memphis	K36CA-D	14	KCIT		
Memphis	K30HH-D	30	KVII-TV		
Midland–Odessa	K31KJ-D	7	KOSA-TV	(Note: Licensed to Big Springs, Texas.)	
Midland–Odessa	KEOO-LD	10	WBPI-CD		
Quanah	K27HM-D	3	KFDX-TV		
Quanah	K29FR-D	6	KAUZ-TV		
Quanah	K31HC-D	7	KSWO-TV		
Quanah	K33HG-D	18	KJTL		
San Angelo	KTXE-LD	12	KTXS-TV		
San Antonio	K04SD-D	10	K03JE-D		
San Antonio	KCOR-CD	34	KNIC-DT		
Sherman–Denison	KXIP-LD	12	KXII		
Tulia	K34KO-D	2	KACV-TV		
Tulia	K25CP-D	4	KAMR-TV		
Tulia	K36CC-D	7	KVII-TV		
Tulia	K21NW-D	10	KFDA-TV		
Tulia	K22NO-D	14	KCIT		
Turkey	K35EM-D	2	KACV-TV		
Turkey	K22JR-D	4	KAMR-TV		
Turkey	K24IX-D	7	KVII-TV		
Turkey	K26JR-D	10	KFDA-TV		
Turkey	K28KV-D	14	KCIT		
Tyler–Kilgore-Longview	KIBN-LD	14	KTWC-LD		
Tyler–Kilgore-Longview	K21PE-D	21	KLTV		
Tyler–Kilgore-Longview	KLGV-LD	36	KTWC-LD		
Tyler–Kilgore-Longview	KFXL-LD	51	KFXK-TV		
Wichita Falls	K19KE-D	7	KSWO-TV	(Note: Licensed to Jolly, Texas.)	
Wichita Falls	K26NK-D	13	KERA-TV		

== Defunct ==
- KAEC-TV Nacogdoches (1969–1970)
- KANG-TV Waco (1953–1955)
- KBMT Beaumont (1954–1956)
- KDCD-TV Midland (1961–1962 and 1968–1971)
- KDYW Waco (1989–2010)
- KETX Tyler (1953–1954)
- KFWT Fort Worth (1967–1969)
- KIDZ-TV Wichita Falls (1974–1980)
- KMEC-TV Dallas (1967–1968, 1972 and 1973)
- KMXN-TV Lubbock (1967–1970 and 1970–1972)
- KNUZ-TV Houston (1953–1954)
- KRET-TV Richardson (1960–1970)
- KTES Nacogdoches (1958–1959)
- KTVE Longview/Tyler (1953–1955)
- KVDO-TV Corpus Christi (1954–1957)
- KVLF-TV Alpine (1961–1963)
- KVTV Laredo (1973–2016)
- KVVV-TV Galveston (1968–1969)

== See also ==
- Television stations in Chihuahua
- Television stations in Coahuila
- Television stations in Nuevo León
- Television stations in Tamaulipas

== Bibliography ==
- "United States TV Stations: Texas", Yearbook of Radio and Television, New York: Radio Television Daily, 1964, OCLC 7469377 – via Internet Archive
