= NBC 25 =

NBC 25 may refer to one of the following television stations in the United States:

== Current ==
- KAVU-DT2 in Victoria, Texas
  - Local simulcast of KMOL-LD
- KNDU in Richland/Pasco/Kennewick, Washington
  - Semi-satellite of KNDO in Yakima, Washington
- WEEK-TV in Peoria, Illinois
- WSMH-DT2, a digital channel of WSMH in Flint, Michigan (broadcasts on channel 66.2)
- WXXV-DT2 in Biloxi/Gulfport, Mississippi

== Former ==
- KAVU-TV in Victoria, Texas (1982–1994)
- KXXV in Waco/Temple, Texas (1985)
- WCOS-TV (now WOLO-TV) in Columbia, South Carolina (1953)
- WEYI-TV in Saginaw/Flint, Michigan (1995–2025)
- WHAG-TV (now WDVM-TV) in Hagerstown, Maryland (1970–2016)
- WJTV in Jackson Mississippi (1953; now on channel 12)
