= KSIX =

KSIX may refer to:

- KSIX (AM), a radio station (1230 AM) licensed to serve Corpus Christi, Texas, United States
- KSIX-TV, a television station (channel 22, virtual 13) licensed to serve Hilo, Hawaii, United States
- KFVE, a television station (channel 25/PSIP 6) licensed to serve Kailua-Kona, Hawaii, which held the call sign KSIX-TV in 2020
- KZTV, a television station (channel 10) licensed to serve Corpus Christi, Texas, which held the call sign KSIX-TV from 1956 to 1957
