= KXTS =

KXTS may refer to:

- KXTS (FM), a radio station (98.7 FM) licensed to serve Geyserville, California, United States
- KXTS-LD, a low-power television station (channel 26, virtual 41) licensed to serve Victoria, Texas, United States
- KUNU-LP, a low-power television station (channel 21) licensed to serve Victoria, which held the call sign KXTS-LP from 2000 to 2011
