= NBC 17 =

NBC 17 may refer to one of the following television stations in the United States:

== Current ==
- KGET-TV in Bakersfield, California
- KMOL-LD in Victoria, Texas
- WAND in Decatur/Springfield/Champaign/Urbana, Illinois

== Former ==
- KCBJ-TV (now KMIZ) in Columbia/Jefferson City, Missouri (1982 to 1985)
- WBUF-TV in Buffalo, New York (was owned-and-operated by NBC from 1955 to 1958)
- WJKS (now WCWJ) in Jacksonville, Florida (1980 to 1988)
- WNCN in Raleigh/Durham, North Carolina (1995 to 2016; was owned-and-operated by NBC until 2006)
- WTVO in Rockford, Illinois (1953 to 1995)
