= ABC 25 =

ABC 25 may refer to one of the following television stations in the US affiliated with the American Broadcasting Company:

- KAVU-TV in Victoria, Texas
- KXXV in Waco, Texas
- WEEK-DT2, a digital channel of WEEK-TV in Peoria, Illinois
- WEHT in Evansville, Indiana
- WJXX in Jacksonville, Florida
- WOLO-TV in Columbia, South Carolina
- WPBF in West Palm Beach, Florida
