= KRIS-TV =

Television station in Corpus Christi, Texas

- Corpus Christi, Texas; United States
- Channels: Digital: 26 (UHF); Virtual: 6
- Branding: KRIS-TV 6 (pronounced "Chris"); KRIS 6 News

Programming
- Affiliations: 6.1: NBC; for others, see § Subchannels

Ownership
- Owner: E. W. Scripps Company; (Scripps Broadcasting Holdings LLC)
- Sister stations: KZTV, K22JA-D

History
- First air date: May 23, 1956
- Former channel numbers: Analog: 6 (VHF, 1956–2009); Digital: 13 (VHF, 2004–2022)
- Former affiliations: Both secondary: ABC (1956–1964); Fox (1989–1991)
- Call sign meaning: Corpus K(C)hristi

Technical information
- Licensing authority: FCC
- Facility ID: 25559
- ERP: 1,000 kW
- HAAT: 295 m (968 ft)
- Transmitter coordinates: 27°45′32.9″N 97°36′27.3″W

Links
- Public license information: Public file; LMS
- Website: www.kristv.com

KRIS-TV (channel 6) is a television station in Corpus Christi, Texas, United States, affiliated with NBC. It is owned by the E. W. Scripps Company alongside low-power dual Telemundo affiliate/independent station K22JA-D and operated with CBS affiliate KZTV (channel 10). The three stations share studios on Artesian Street in downtown Corpus Christi; KRIS-TV's transmitter is located in Robstown, Texas.

== History ==
KRIS-TV began broadcasting on May 23, 1956, as the first VHF television station in the area beating former rival KZTV by four months. It aired an analog signal on VHF channel 6 and originally had studios on South Staples Street in Downtown Corpus Christi. The channel has always been an NBC affiliate but shared secondary ABC status with KZTV until KIII launched on May 4, 1964. In 1989, it was a secondary Fox affiliate carrying a few shows during syndicated hours on the weekends. This ended in 1991 due to other affiliates becoming available on cable via Foxnet. KRIS-TV was the first television station in the United States to air hard liquor ads after a self-imposed 1948 industry ban was lifted. A commercial for Crown Royal whiskey aired on the station in 1996 featuring a puppy with a diploma and another carrying a Crown Royal bag in its mouth. Cordillera Communications bought the station in 1998.

On July 23, 2008, Eagle Creek Broadcasting announced that it had sold KZTV to Cordillera Communications. The transaction was opposed by McKinnon Broadcasting who at the time owned rival KIII. This objection held up the deal until August 24, 2009, when Eagle Creek announced a shared services agreement (SSA) had been established with KRIS. Cordillera acquired all KZTV assets with Eagle Creek owning the broadcast license.

On August 24, 2017, KRIS and KZTV began simulcasting together to provide full coverage of Hurricane Harvey with both news teams.

Cordillera announced on October 29, 2018, that it would sell most of its stations, including KRIS and the SSA with KZTV, to the E. W. Scripps Company. The sale was completed on May 1, 2019. Combined with an unrelated side deal resulting from an acquisition involving Raycom Media and Gray Television ongoing at the time of the purchase, it made KRIS a sister station to ABC affiliate KXXV in Waco. It also marked Scripps' return to Corpus Christi, as the company owned the Caller-Times from 1997 to 2015.

=== KRIS-DT2 ===
What is now KRIS-DT2 began on September 21, 1998, after KRIS entered into a partnership with The WB 100+, a national programming service operated by The WB for television markets ranked greater than 100, and cable systems in the Corpus Christi area. Prior to 1998, The WB's programming was available in Corpus Christi via K22BH, WGN-TV's superstation feed, and/or out-of-market WB affiliates. It was a cable-exclusive station, and as a result, used the call sign "KWDB" in a fictional manner for identification purposes. KRIS provided local advertising opportunities and performed promotional duties for the outlet.

On January 24, 2006, CBS Corporation (which became separate from Viacom after 2005; the companies would remerge in 2019) and Warner Bros. Television (the company which owned The WB) announced they then would cease operating The WB and UPN networks and combine their resources to create a programming service called The CW. The letters would represent the first initial of the new network's respective corporate parents.

On September 18 of that year, The CW officially launched nationwide at which point KRIS added a new second digital subchannel to simulcast "KWDB" and allowing non-cable subscribers access to the new network. With its over-their-air launch, "KWDB" began using KRIS-DT2 as its official calls and became part of The CW Plus, a successor to The WB 100+.

On April 19, 2024, Nexstar Media Group, majority owner of The CW, announced that the network would not renew its affiliations with Scripps-owned stations, including KRIS-DT2. On July 31, Sinclair Broadcast Group announced that it had reached a deal with the network in which it would affiliate with KSCC (channel 38).

== News operation ==
KRIS-TV currently broadcasts 31 hours of locally produced newscasts each week (with five hours each weekday, 2 1/2 hours on Saturdays, and 3 1/2 hours on Sundays). A half-hour newscast airs seven days a week on CW South Texas (channel 6.2), as well as sister station KDF-TV as KRIS 6 News at Nine.

After Evening Post bought KZTV, the company merged operations at KZTV's studios. The move took place in September 2010. Due to technical issues with the move, it was not able to air newscasts from September 26 until September 28.

At the new location, KRIS-TV unveiled a new, high-definition-ready set and graphics package on September 29, 2010. The station has now become the area's first to air newscasts in 16:9 enhanced definition widescreen. As of October 16, KZTV began simulcasting KRIS-TV's weekday morning, noon, and weekend broadcasts after dropping its own shows in those time periods. For the weekend newscasts, however, there are occasionally preemptions on one channel due to network obligations.

On August 7, 2011, KRIS began broadcasting news in "true" HD, where the newscasts are known as KRIS 6 News in HD. KRIS-TV is the second television station in Corpus Christi to broadcast in HD, behind sister station KZTV, who began broadcasting in HD on August 1, 2011.

In early 2014, KRIS-TV rebranded its newscasts as KRIS 6 News. With the rebranding came a new logo and a new opening to the newscasts.

In late 2014, KRIS expanded their 9 p.m. newscasts on KDF and The CW South Texas to Saturdays and Sundays.

In April 2015, KRIS have expanded their newscasts to Sundays at 5 p.m. and expanded 6 News at Sunrise to Saturdays and Sundays at 6 a.m.

In July 2018, KRIS expanded their noon newscast to one hour; only the first half hour continues to be simulcast on sister station KZTV.

In October 2023, KRIS-TV began simulcasting their newscasts on KZTV (branded as KRIS 6 News on KZTV), replacing KZTV's own. Around mid-2024, the news team for KZTV transferred over to KRIS, and the news operation for KZTV is now non-existent.

== Technical information ==
=== Subchannels ===
The station's signal is multiplexed:

Subchannels of KRIS-TV
Subchannel	Res.	Short name	Programming
6.1	1080i	KRIS-HD	NBC
6.2	720p	LAFF	Laff
6.3	480i	GRIT	Grit
6.4	480i	CourtTV	Court TV
6.5	480i	ION	Ion
6.6	480i	Busted	Busted
6.7	480i	Home	HSN

=== Analog-to-digital conversion ===
KRIS-TV shut down its analog signal, over VHF channel 6, at noon on June 12, 2009, the official date on which full-power television stations in the United States transitioned from analog to digital broadcasts under federal mandate. The station's digital signal remained on its pre-transition VHF channel 13, using virtual channel 6. The station's analog signal transmitted on a frequency of 87.75 MHz (+10 kHz shift), and as a result, could be picked up on the lower end of the dial on most FM radios at 87.7. This was true of all other analog channel 6 stations in North America. This is no longer possible for full-power stations after the conversion to digital broadcasting.

=== Tower collapse ===
On the morning of April 29, 2020, the KRIS broadcast tower collapsed due to a guy-wire failure during a high wind event; further inspection revealed the failed guy-wire to have been heavily corroded. No personnel were on site at the time of the collapse, and collateral damage was limited to minor damage to the transmitter building. The tower was shared with low-power sister station K22JA-D, as well as radio stations KPLV (88.7 FM), KLUX (89.5 FM), and KFTX (97.5 FM). Both television stations were temporarily multiplexed on KZTV's VHF channel 10 frequency and mapped to their respective virtual channel positions.

The tower, built in 1988, had a history of poor maintenance. The FCC had already been investigating Cordillera Communications' management of their broadcast towers, including those of KRIS and its low-power sisters. In the spring of 2019, as a condition of the sale of Cordillera's station portfolio to Scripps, Scripps agreed to accept liability for the results of the investigation; the FCC later fined Scripps $1.13 million. The fine resulted from Cordillera's "failing to conduct required daily inspections of the lighting systems of 10 antenna structures", "failing to completely log 12 lighting failures at seven antenna structures", and "failing to timely notify the Commission of its acquisition of two antenna structures". The KRIS tower was noted as not having had daily inspections of its lighting system and lighting failures that were not logged.

KRIS activated their replacement transmission facility on VHF channel 13 in March 2021. The station changed to their current UHF channel 26 a year later in February 2022. Both antennas were installed at an existing American Tower Corporation site approximately 1.1 miles (1.8 km) northwest of the old KRIS facilities.
