= KXPX-LP =

Television station in Corpus Christi, Texas (1991–2018)

Corpus Christi, Texas; United States
- Channels: Analog: 14 (UHF)

Programming
- Affiliations: Telemundo (1991–1993); Independent (1993–1998); Pax (1998–2003); The Sportsman Channel (2003–2009); Retro TV (2009–2017); TBD (2017–2018)

Ownership
- Owner: Sinclair Broadcast Group; (KUQI Licensee, LLC)
- Sister stations: KSCC, KTOV-LP

History
- Founded: July 13, 1990
- First air date: March 15, 1991
- Last air date: April 3, 2018; (27 years, 19 days); (license canceled)
- Former call signs: K66EB (1991–1999); KXPX-LP (1999–2000); KXPX-CA (2000–2012)
- Former channel number(s): Analog: 66 (UHF, 1991–1999)
- Call sign meaning: Pax (former affiliation)

Technical information
- Facility ID: 14678
- Class: LP
- ERP: 8 kW
- Transmitter coordinates: 27°47′47.0″N 97°23′48.0″W
- Translator(s): KSCC-DT 38.2 (UHF) Corpus Christi

KXPX-LP (channel 14) was a low-power television station in Corpus Christi, Texas, United States, which operated from 1991 to 2018. Last owned by Sinclair Broadcast Group, its final programming was the digital multicast network TBD. It was functionally replaced by a digital subchannel of co-owned Fox affiliate KSCC (channel 38). The transmitter was located on Leopard Street in Corpus Christi.

== History ==
The station went on the air as K66EB (channel 66) on March 15, 1991. It was originally an affiliate of Telemundo with local programming consisting of lottery results and a weekly Catholic Mass and the Home Shopping Network in overnight hours. It lost Telemundo two years after startup to a new low-power station, K68DJ "KAJA", co-owned with local independent station K47DF "KDF".

In 1999, the station moved to channel 14, adopted the call sign KXPX-LP, and affiliated with Pax. It switched to The Sportsman Channel in 2003 and to Retro Television Network in 2009.

GH Broadcasting announced that it would sell KXPX to London Broadcasting Company, owner of KIII (channel 3), in March 2012. The sale fell through in early 2013, after which GH declared bankruptcy, remaining as debtor-in-possession. On July 3, 2012, GH informed the Federal Communications Commission (FCC) that it would surrender its class A status, as it determined that it could no longer comply with the minimum requirements for the classification; KXPX had been a class A station since 2000.

In late 2014, the sale of the station to Corpus 18, LLC, a partnership formed by the noteholders of debt of GH and High Maintenance Broadcasting, owners of KUQI and a related business to GH, was finalized. On October 2, 2015, Corpus 18 agreed to sell KXPX-LP, KUQI, and KTOV-LP to Sinclair Broadcast Group for $9.25 million. It changed programming to TBD in 2017.

KXPX-LP's license was canceled by the FCC on April 3, 2018; its programming is now seen exclusively on KSCC-DT2.
