= KTOV-LP =

Corpus Christi, Texas; United States
- Channels: Analog: 21 (UHF)
- Branding: My KTOV

Programming
- Affiliations: UPN (2002–2006); MyNetworkTV (2006–2018)

Ownership
- Owner: Sinclair Broadcast Group; (KUQI Licensee, LLC)
- Sister stations: KSCC, KXPX-LP

History
- First air date: July 26, 2002
- Last air date: April 3, 2018; (15 years, 251 days); (license canceled)
- Former call signs: KCBO-LP (2002–2004)

Technical information
- Facility ID: 125469
- Class: LP
- ERP: 95 kW
- HAAT: 95 m (312 ft)
- Transmitter coordinates: 27°47′46.0″N 97°23′47.0″W
- Translator(s): KSCC-DT 38.3 (UHF) Corpus Christi

KTOV-LP (channel 21) was a low-power television station in Corpus Christi, Texas, United States, which operated from 2002 to 2018. Last owned by Sinclair Broadcast Group, its final programming was MyNetworkTV. It was functionally replaced by a digital subchannel of co-owned Fox affiliate KSCC (channel 38). The transmitter was located on Leopard Street in Corpus Christi. The "My KTOV" branding is still used on the subchannel.

== History ==
Before becoming an affiliate of MyNetworkTV, KTOV-LP (on channel 7, the former K07UD) was a UPN affiliate beginning in 1999. It assumed the affiliation from KTMV-LP, a station that began carrying Tejano music videos in 1997 but remained on cable in KTOV-LP's stead when it picked up UPN.

Don Gillis and Fred Hoffmann started a third station, KCBO-LP "Coastal Box Office" focusing on sports and movies, in 2001. In 2004, the call signs and programming were switched between channels 7 and 21.

GH Broadcasting announced that it would sell KTOV-LP to London Broadcasting Company, owner of KIII (channel 3), in March 2012. The sale fell through in early 2013, after which GH declared bankruptcy, remaining as debtor-in-possession. In late 2014, the sale of the station to Corpus 18, LLC, a partnership formed by the noteholders of debt of GH and High Maintenance Broadcasting, owners of KUQI and a related business to GH, was finalized. On October 2, 2015, Corpus 18 agreed to sell KTOV-LP, KUQI, and KXPX-LP to Sinclair Broadcast Group for $9.25 million.

KTOV-LP's license was canceled by the Federal Communications Commission (FCC) on April 3, 2018; its programming is now seen exclusively on KSCC-DT3.
