= KVTX-LD =

Television station in Victoria, Texas

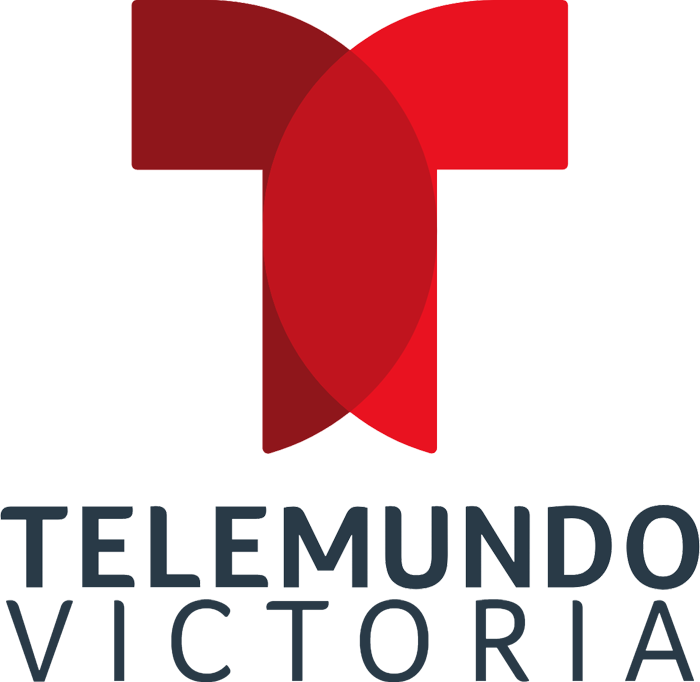
- Victoria, Texas; United States
- Channels: Digital: 15 (UHF); Virtual: 45
- Branding: Telemundo Victoria

Programming
- Affiliations: Telemundo

Ownership
- Owner: Morgan Murphy Media; (QueenB Television of Texas, LLC)
- Sister stations: KMOL-LD, KVCT, KUNU-LD, KAVU-TV, KQZY-LD, KXTS-LD

History
- First air date: December 30, 1994
- Former call signs: K59FQ (1994–1999); KUNU-LP (1999–2000); KVTX-LP (2000–2020)
- Former channel numbers: Analog: 59 (UHF, 1994–2001), 45 (UHF, 2001–2020)
- Former affiliations: Univision (via KXLN, 1994–1999; as a stand-alone station, 1999–2000)
- Call sign meaning: Victoria, Texas

Technical information
- Licensing authority: FCC
- Facility ID: 5842
- Class: LD
- ERP: 15 kW
- HAAT: 312.3 m (1,025 ft)
- Transmitter coordinates: 28°50′43.4″N 97°7′34″W
- Translator(s): KVCT 19.2 Victoria

Links
- Public license information: LMS
- Website: www.crossroadstoday.com

KVTX-LD (channel 45) is a low-power television station in Victoria, Texas, United States, affiliated with the Spanish-language network Telemundo. It is owned by Morgan Murphy Media alongside ABC affiliate KAVU-TV (channel 25) and four other low-power stations: NBC affiliate KMOL-LD (channel 17), CBS affiliate KXTS-LD (channel 41), MeTV affiliate KQZY-LD (channel 33), and Univision affiliate KUNU-LD (channel 21). Morgan Murphy Media also provides certain services to Fox affiliate KVCT (channel 19) under a local marketing agreement (LMA) with SagamoreHill Broadcasting. All of the stations share studios on North Navarro Street in Victoria and transmitter facilities on Farm to Market Road 236 west of the city.

Even though KVTX-LD has a digital signal of its own, the low-power broadcasting radius only covers the immediate Victoria area. Therefore, the station can also be seen through a 720p high-definition simulcast on KVCT's second digital subchannel in order to reach the entire market; this signal can be seen on channel 19.2 from the same Farm to Market Road 236 transmitter site west of Victoria.

== Subchannel ==
Subchannel of KVTX-LD
Channel	Res.	Short name	Programming
45.1	1080i	KVTX-LD	Telemundo
