= Fox 38 =

Fox 38 may refer to one of the following television stations in the U.S. affiliated with Fox Broadcasting Company:

== Current ==
- KSCC in Corpus Christi, Texas

== Former ==
- KJTM-TV/KASN in Pine Bluff–Little Rock, Arkansas (1986–1990)
- WBAK-TV (now WAWV-TV) in Terre Haute, Indiana (1995–2011)
- WNOL-TV in New Orleans, Louisiana (1986–1995)
