= CW 38 =

CW 38 may refer to the following television stations in the U.S. affiliated with The CW:

== Current ==
=== Owned-and-operated ===
- WNOL-TV in New Orleans, Louisiana
- WTTA in St. Petersburg–Tampa, Florida

=== Affiliates ===
- KASN in Pine Bluff–Little Rock, Arkansas
- KSCC-DT3 in Corpus Christi, Texas
- WSWB in Scranton–Wilkes-Barre, Pennsylvania

== Former ==
- WADL in Mount Clemens–Detroit, Michigan (September–October 2023)
