= KCRP =

KCRP may refer to:

- the ICAO airport code for Corpus Christi International Airport
- KCRP-CD, a television station (channel 17, virtual 41) licensed to Corpus Christi, Texas, United States
