= CW 19 =

CW 19 may refer to the following television stations in the U.S. affiliated with The CW:

== Current ==
- KEPR-DT2 in Pasco–Richland–Kennewick, Washington
- KQCW-DT in Muskogee–Tulsa, Oklahoma
- KVCT-DT3 in Victoria, Texas
- KWBQ in Albuquerque–Santa Fe, New Mexico
- KYTX-DT2 in Tyler–Longview, Texas

== Former ==
- WPCW (now WPKD-TV) in Jeannette–Pittsburgh, Pennsylvania (2006–2023)
