= KETX =

KETX may refer to:

- KETX (AM), a radio station (1440 AM) licensed to serve Livingston, Texas, United States
- KETX (TV), a former TV station in Tyler, Texas, that broadcast on channel 19 from 1953 to 1954
- KEHH, a radio station (92.3 FM) licensed to serve Livingston, Texas, that held the call sign KETX-FM from 1970 to 2019
- KETX-LP, a defunct television station (channel 7) formerly licensed to serve Livingston, Texas
