= KULC =

KULC may refer to:

- KULC-LD, a television station (channel 26) licensed to serve Port Arthur, Texas, United States; see List of television stations in Texas
- KUEN, a television station (channel 36, virtual 9) licensed to serve Ogden, Utah, United States, which held the call sign KULC from 1986 to 2004
