= KVAD =

KVAD may refer to:

- Moody Air Force Base (ICAO code KVAD)
- KVAD-LD, a low-power television station (channel 16) licensed to serve Amarillo, Texas, United States
