= KUNU-LD =

Television station in Victoria, Texas

- Victoria, Texas; United States
- Channels: Digital: 27 (UHF); Virtual: 21
- Branding: Univision Victoria

Programming
- Affiliations: 21.1: Univision

Ownership
- Owner: Morgan Murphy Media; (QueenB Television of Texas, LLC)
- Sister stations: KMOL-LD, KVCT, KAVU-TV, KQZY-LD, KXTS-LD, KVTX-LD

History
- Founded: 1994
- First air date: December 30, 1994
- Former call signs: K27EZ (1994−March 1999); K21FQ (March−October 1999); KVTX-LP (October 1999−2000); KUNU-LP (2000−2012)
- Former channel numbers: Analog: 27 (UHF, 1994−1999); 21 (UHF, 1999−2012); Digital: 28 (UHF, 2012−2020)
- Former affiliations: Independent (via KTXH, 1994−1995); UPN (via KTXH, 1995−1999); Telemundo (1999−2000)

Technical information
- Licensing authority: FCC
- Facility ID: 57866
- Class: LD
- ERP: 15 kW
- HAAT: 312 m (1,024 ft)
- Transmitter coordinates: 28°50′43.4″N 97°7′34″W

Links
- Public license information: LMS
- Website: www.crossroadstoday.com

KUNU-LD (channel 21) is a low-power television station in Victoria, Texas, United States, affiliated with the Spanish-language network Univision. It is owned by Morgan Murphy Media alongside ABC affiliate KAVU-TV (channel 25) and four other low-power stations: NBC affiliate KMOL-LD (channel 17), CBS affiliate KXTS-LD (channel 41), MeTV affiliate KQZY-LD (channel 33), and Telemundo affiliate KVTX-LD (channel 45). Morgan Murphy Media also provides certain services to Fox affiliate KVCT (channel 19) under a local marketing agreement (LMA) with SagamoreHill Broadcasting. All of the stations share studios on North Navarro Street in Victoria and transmitter facilities on Farm to Market Road 236 west of the city.

== History ==
The station signed on December 30, 1994, as a translator of Houston independent station KTXH under the call sign K27EZ on channel 27, and later flipped to UPN. In March 1999, the station moved to channel 21 and changed the callsign to K21FQ for a few months, before changing again to KVTX-LP in October of that same year and began broadcasting Telemundo, only for it to move to KVTX-LD on June 30, 2000, it then affiliated with Univision, and changed its call sign to KUNU-LP in order to match the new affiliation.

In 2012, KUNU-LP's call sign was changed to KUNU-LD.

== Subchannels ==
The station's signal is multiplexed:

Subchannels of KUNU-LD
Channel	Res.	Short name	Programming
21.1	1080i	KUNU-HD	Univision
