= KVCT =

Television station in Victoria, Texas

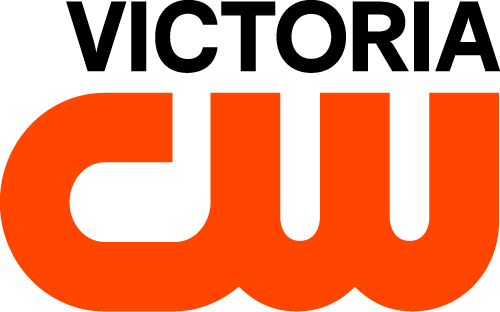
- Victoria, Texas; United States
- Channels: Digital: 11 (VHF); Virtual: 19
- Branding: Fox 19; Fox 19 News Now; Telemundo 45 (19.2); CW Victoria (19.3)

Programming
- Affiliations: 19.1: Fox; 19.2: Telemundo; 19.3: CW+; 19.4: Heroes & Icons

Ownership
- Owner: SagamoreHill Broadcasting; (SagamoreHill of Victoria Licenses, LLC)
- Operator: Morgan Murphy Media
- Sister stations: KMOL-LD, KUNU-LD, KAVU-TV, KQZY-LD, KXTS-LD, KVTX-LD

History
- First air date: November 22, 1969
- Former call signs: KXIX (1969–1984)
- Former channel numbers: Analog: 19 (UHF, 1969–2009)
- Former affiliations: ABC (1969–1990); Religious independent; (1990, 1991–1994); Dark (1990–1991, 1994)
- Call sign meaning: Victoria

Technical information
- Licensing authority: FCC
- Facility ID: 35846
- ERP: 11.35 kW
- HAAT: 290 m (951 ft)
- Transmitter coordinates: 28°50′43.4″N 97°7′34″W
- Translator(s): 25 (UHF) Victoria

Links
- Public license information: Public file; LMS
- Website: www.crossroadstoday.com

KVCT (channel 19) is a television station in Victoria, Texas, United States, affiliated with Fox and The CW Plus. It is owned by SagamoreHill Broadcasting and operated by Morgan Murphy Media alongside ABC affiliate KAVU-TV (channel 25), NBC affiliate KMOL-LD (channel 17), Univision affiliate KUNU-LD (channel 21), MeTV affiliate KQZY-LD (channel 33), CBS affiliate KXTS-LD (channel 41), and Telemundo affiliate KVTX-LD (channel 45); these stations form the Victoria Television Group. All of the stations share studios on North Navarro Street in Victoria and transmitter facilities on Farm to Market Road 236 west of the city.

== History ==
=== Early years ===
Channel 19 was originally assigned to Victoria in 1952. A. B. Alkek obtained the first construction permit but opted not to build it after instead constructing Tele-Tenna, the town's first cable system. Some interest was shown again in 1957, but no station resulted.

By late 1963, two applications had been received by the Federal Communications Commission, from Guadalupe Valley Telecasting Company—headed by Dwight Strahan—and the Frels family doing business as the Victoria Television Company. A hearing examiner gave the nod to the Frels in June 1964, but the ownership of the construction permit would completely turn over before KXIX broadcast a picture. The permit was assigned to a new Guadalupe Valley Telecasting Company, consisting of the Frels family and Strahan, in 1965. Two years later, the Frels family sold their interests to McKinnon Broadcasting, owner of KIII, the ABC affiliate in Corpus Christi.

Now a joint venture of KIII and Dwight Strahan, KXIX signed on November 22, 1969, after beginning test broadcasts a day earlier. It broadcast color and ABC network programming from KIII and also maintained a studio in Victoria for black-and-white program production.

=== Victoria Communications Corporation ===
In June 1975, Victoria Communications Corporation, a consortium of local investors, reached a deal to buy KXIX from Guadalupe Valley for $225,000. The new owners took over on March 17, 1976, and began operating the station independently, severing the link with KIII.

Victoria gained a second station when KAVU-TV (channel 25) went on the air in July 1982. Broadcasting, as it had from the start, with an effective radiated power of 14,800 watts, it was far weaker than KAVU. In February 1984, the station increased its effective radiated power to 154,000 watts, increasing its signal area by some 50 percent, and changed its call sign to the present KVCT. The new transmitter posed problems for the station, which had to buy replacement parts; claiming manufacturer Harris Corporation misrepresented its features, Victoria Communications sued Harris.

=== The Christian era ===
By the late 1980s, Victoria's two television stations were both facing their own difficulties, and they were connected by one party. In 1989, the First Victoria National Bank acquired KAVU-TV as part of a settlement in a case involving representations to investors in that station. As KAVU's former general manager warned, the bank then foreclosed on KVCT and, in a move that turned Victoria into a market with one commercial television station, consolidated its commercial operation with KAVU-TV at that station's facilities.

KAVU-TV and the station's real estate assets were sold to Withers Broadcasting for approximately $1.52 million, while KVCT sold for $1.5 million. Approval of the transactions was delayed, as Withers could not retain both licenses and needed to find a buyer for KVCT; the deal was approved after striking a deal with Jerianne Medley of Friendswood in March 1990.

The Withers purchase and KVCT divestiture were completed in early July 1990; on July 5, all of KVCT's sales staff and most of its news team reported to work at KAVU, and two months later, channel 25 became an affiliate of NBC and ABC, as KVCT became an independent Christian station.

Having been stripped of its valuable assets and ABC affiliation by the shuffle, KVCT—which rebuilt its program lineup around FamilyNet—immediately encountered financial difficulties; it slashed its broadcast day to seven hours in the afternoon and evening. Owner Medley opted to abandon the Victoria market altogether, and with acting general manager Jerry Proctor citing the inability of the small market to sustain two television stations as it had for eight years, channel 19 signed off November 6, 1990. Medley sought to have the station and channel allocation moved to New Braunfels, where KVCT could enter the San Antonio media market.

Victoria viewers would not see a picture from channel 19 for more than a year. It returned to the air on December 21, 1991, under the operation of Jim Moss and Dale Hill. Under their management, KVCT again operated as an independent Christian outlet, this time also soliciting donations from viewers in telethons. It also produced a local call-in show. However, the station was not able to financially sustain itself after a rent increase in 1993, and channel 19 went dark again on February 28, 1994.

=== Fox 19 ===
The fall of 1994 brought KVCT its eventual savior—the same group that had merged its commercial assets with KAVU-TV four years prior. Under a lease agreement with Withers Broadcasting, KVCT returned to the air on September 11 as the market's first Fox affiliate; previously, viewers depended on Foxnet to see the network's programs. The station license was transferred to VictoriaVision, Inc., controlled by prior acting general manager Proctor. A local newscast was briefly produced by KAVU-TV as well, ending in 1999 when it was replaced with The News of Texas.

Saga Communications acquired KAVU-TV from Withers in 1998. That year, control of VictoriaVision passed to Dana R. Withers; the next year, the station was sold outright to Surtsey Productions of Grosse Pointe, Michigan.

When Saga sold its television stations to Morgan Murphy Media in 2017, in a parallel transaction, Morgan Murphy acquired the assets of Surtsey's two stations, both operated by Saga—KVCT and KFJX in Pittsburg, Kansas. The licenses were sold to SagamoreHill Broadcasting, with Morgan Murphy continuing to operate them under local marketing agreements.

== Subchannels ==
The station's signal is multiplexed:

Subchannels of KVCT
Subchannel	Res.	Short name	Programming
19.1	720p	KVCT-HD	Fox
19.2	720p	KVTX	Telemundo (KVTX-LD)
19.3	720p	CW	The CW Plus
19.4	480i	H & I	Heroes & Icons

Simulcast of subchannel of another station
