= KXTS-LD =

Television station in Victoria, Texas

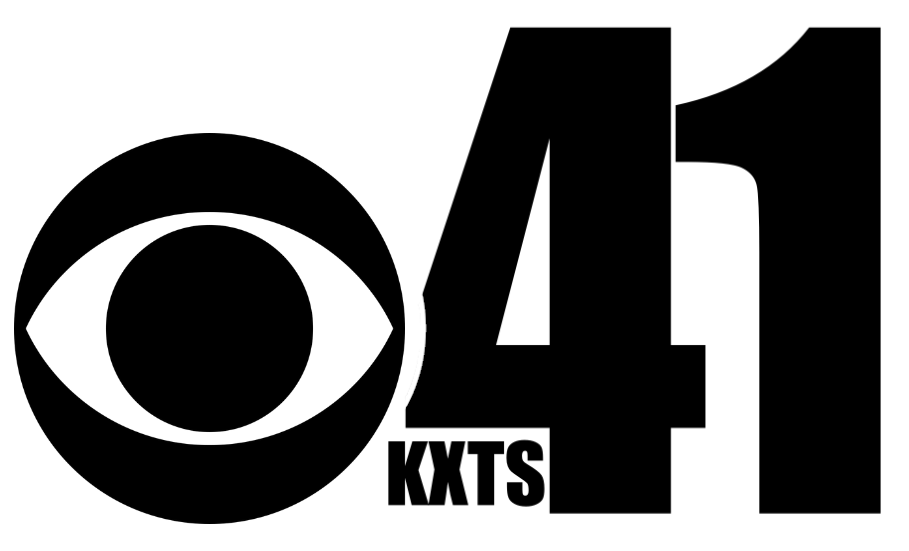
- Victoria, Texas; United States
- Channels: Digital: 26 (UHF); Virtual: 41
- Branding: CBS 41; CBS Victoria; 25 News Now (during KAVU newscast replays)

Programming
- Affiliations: 41.1: CBS; 41.2: Antenna TV; 41.3: HSN

Ownership
- Owner: Morgan Murphy Media; (QueenB Television of Texas, LLC)
- Sister stations: KMOL-LD, KVCT, KUNU-LD, KAVU-TV, KQZY-LD, KVTX-LD

History
- First air date: December 30, 1994
- Former call signs: K64EQ (1994–2000); KXTS-LP (2000–2012)
- Former channel numbers: Analog: 64 (UHF, 1994–2000); 41 (UHF, 2000–2012); Digital: 19 (UHF, 2012–2020)
- Former affiliations: NBC (via KPRC-TV, 1994–2000; as a stand-alone station, 2000–2004); UPN (2004–2006); MyNetworkTV (2006–2011)

Technical information
- Licensing authority: FCC
- Facility ID: 31516
- Class: LD
- ERP: 15 kW
- HAAT: 312.3 m (1,025 ft)
- Transmitter coordinates: 28°50′43.4″N 97°7′34″W
- Translator(s): KAVU-TV 25.3 Victoria

Links
- Public license information: LMS
- Website: www.crossroadstoday.com

KXTS-LD (channel 41) is a low-power television station in Victoria, Texas, United States, affiliated with CBS. It is owned by Morgan Murphy Media alongside ABC affiliate KAVU-TV (channel 25) and four other low-power stations: NBC affiliate KMOL-LD (channel 17), Univision affiliate KUNU-LD (channel 21), MeTV affiliate KQZY-LD (channel 33), and Telemundo affiliate KVTX-LD (channel 45). Morgan Murphy Media also provides certain services to Fox affiliate KVCT (channel 19) under a local marketing agreement (LMA) with SagamoreHill Broadcasting. All of the stations share studios on North Navarro Street in Victoria and transmitter facilities on Farm to Market Road 236 west of the city.

== History ==
KXTS-LP signed on in 1994 as an NBC affiliate as a translator of the network's Houston affiliate KPRC-TV, and later became a separate NBC affiliate. It then broadcast UPN between 2004 and 2006, before airing MyNetworkTV from September 2006 until September 2011 after UPN and The WB merged into The CW.

On September 12, 2011, KXTS-LP dropped MyNetworkTV completely (after it became a programming service in 2009 instead of a full TV network) and became the first CBS affiliate in the Victoria area.

The station converted to digital operations on January 5, 2012, and its call sign was changed to KXTS-LD. It also added a second digital subchannel to carry classic programming from Antenna TV. KXTS is also carried along with two sister stations as a digital subchannel of KAVU-TV.

== Subchannels ==
The station's signal is multiplexed:

Subchannels of KXTS-LD
Channel	Res.	Short name	Programming
41.1	1080i	KXTS-DT	CBS
41.2	480i	KXTS-DT	Antenna TV
41.3	480i	KXTSHSN	HSN
