= KDYS-LD =

- Spokane, Washington; United States
- Channels: Digital: 32 (UHF); Virtual: 32
- Branding: Telemundo Spokane

Programming
- Affiliations: 32.1: Telemundo; for others, see § Subchannels

Ownership
- Owner: SagamoreHill Broadcasting; (SagamoreHill of Portland LLC)

History
- Founded: April 3, 1985
- First air date: 1987; 39 years ago
- Former call signs: K55EB (1985–2007); K32GS (2007–2010); KDYS-LP (2010–2013)
- Former channel numbers: Analog: 55 (UHF, 1987-2007); 32 (UHF, 2007-2013)
- Former affiliations: TBN (1989–2010); Daystar (2010-2025)
- Call sign meaning: DaYstar Spokane (Former affiliate)

Technical information
- Licensing authority: FCC
- Facility ID: 67936
- ERP: 10 kW
- HAAT: 415 m
- Transmitter coordinates: 47°35′57.2″N 117°18′1.2″W

Links
- Public license information: LMS
- Website: www.telemundospokane.com

KDYS-LD (channel 32) is a low-powered television station in Spokane, Washington, United States, affiliated with Telemundo and owned by SagamoreHill Broadcasting. The station's transmitter is located on Krell Hill in southeast Spokane.

== History ==
The station was founded as K55EB on April 3, 1985, with a grant of an original construction permit to J-Pax Broadcasters to build a low-power television station on UHF channel 55 to serve Spokane. Almost immediately, J-Pax entered into an agreement to sell the permit to International Broadcast Consultants, Inc.; the sale was consummated December 10, 1985. International Broadcast Consultants completed construction of the station, which came on the air in fall of 1987 and was licensed November 18, 1987. Trinity Broadcasting Network (TBN) acquired the station from International Broadcast Consultants on July 27, 1989; the station then became a satellite repeater of TBN.

On January 16, 2007, needing to abandon its 700-MHz frequency, the station moved to UHF channel 32 and was assigned the call sign K32GS.

A deal was reached to sell K32GS to Word of God Fellowship, owner of the Daystar Television Network, on March 19, 2010; the deal made K32GS a sister station to KQUP. Daystar changed the call letters to KDYS-LP.

In 2025, Daystar Television Network reached a deal to sell KDYS-LD to SagamoreHill Broadcasting for $250,000. In January 2026, the station became a Telemundo affiliate.

== Technical information ==
=== Subchannels ===
Channel	Video	Aspect	Short name	Programming
32.1	1080i	16:9		Main KDYS-LD programming / Telemundo
32.2	480p	16:9		MovieSphere Gold
32.4	480i	16:9		Buzzr

=== Analog-to-digital conversion ===
On May 16, 2013, the station was issued its license for digital broadcasting, and the call sign was changed to KDYS-LD. The analog signal went off the air on May 11, 2013, and the digital signal went on the air in June 2013.
