= KTVE (Texas) =

Television station in Longview, Texas (1953–1955)

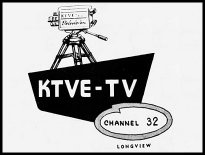
- Longview, Texas; United States
- Channels: Analog: 32 (UHF)

Programming
- Affiliations: Independent

Ownership
- Owner: Arlington James Henry trading as East Texas Television Company

History
- First air date: October 25, 1953
- Last air date: December 25, 1955; (2 years, 61 days)

Technical information
- ERP: 224 kW
- HAAT: 88 m (290 ft)
- Transmitter coordinates: 32°26′37″N 94°49′5.5″W

KTVE (channel 32) was an independent television station in Longview, Texas, United States, which broadcast from 1953 to 1955. It was one of the first television stations in east Texas. However, its use of the quickly outmoded UHF, and the arrival of a VHF station in the form of KLTV (channel 7), made continued operation unviable, and the station closed on Christmas Day 1955.

== History ==
The East Texas Television Company, headed by appliance store owner Arlington James Henry, filed for newly allocated UHF channel 32 in June 1952, two months after the Federal Communications Commission lifted the four-year freeze on new television stations.

Ground was broken in March 1953 on KTVE's studio-transmitter complex, located on land owned by Henry on then-State Highway 26 between Kilgore and Longview (now State Highway 31). Construction was completed that October, when channel 32 began broadcasting a test pattern ahead of its first day of operations on October 25. It was the second UHF station in the region to go on the air; while KETX (channel 19) at Tyler had gone on the air a month before KTVE debuted, it was operating on a low-power basis. The main studio was outfitted with a permanent kitchen set, used on its "Holiday Kitchen" program. Channel 32 would telecast from 4 p.m. to 11:30 p.m. daily, except on the weekends when it would sign on earlier for sports coverage.

KTVE was a small venture, even compared to the other television station in the region, KETX. While it aired some network programs, particularly from CBS, on kinescopes, it did not actually have a full network affiliation; by contrast, KETX-TV was an affiliate of NBC, CBS, and DuMont. With the construction permit for KLTV on VHF channel 7 looming, Henry knew that the current situation was untenable. In July 1954, East Texas Television Company motioned to have KLTV moved to a UHF channel, even though construction was already well under way for the new VHF outlet. The FCC denied its proposal in October.

Despite not having a network affiliation, KTVE broadcast the 1954 World Series to Longview by relaying the signal of a station in Shreveport, Louisiana, for the first three games. However, the day of Game 4, viewers instead saw Henry on their screens, reading a telegram from NBC ordering the station to cease and desist from its action. (KLTV later launched with a full NBC affiliation just one week later.)

KLTV's October 1954 arrival marked the beginning of the end for KTVE, but unlike KETX-TV, which ceased telecasting just eight days after KLTV launched, channel 32 continued telecasting through much of 1955. That March, the FCC approved an increase in effective radiated power from 20,000 to 224,000 watts. However, that was not enough to improve the television station's financial position. KTVE signed off Christmas Day 1955, making it the 18th UHF television station to fold that year. Henry stated that KTVE went off the air in order to carry out a financial reorganization.

After KTVE ceased telecasting, Henry announced the acquisition of the construction permit by Gregg Television, a corporation headed by Hugh U. Garrett. However, the FCC cancelled the permit for KTVE and two other stations for failure to prosecute in September 1956, with Henry still listed as the permittee. Gregg Television instead entered into a chaotic and unsuccessful battle to wrest the educational channel 2 allocation from Denton for commercial use in Longview.
