= KAVU-TV =

Television station in Victoria, Texas

- Victoria, Texas; United States
- Channels: Digital: 20 (UHF); Virtual: 25
- Branding: KAVU 25; KAVU 25 News Now

Programming
- Affiliations: 25.1: ABC; 25.2: NBC; 25.3: CBS; for others, see § Subchannels

Ownership
- Owner: Morgan Murphy Media; (QueenB Television of Texas, LLC)
- Sister stations: KMOL-LD, KVCT, KUNU-LD, KQZY-LD, KXTS-LD, KVTX-LD

History
- First air date: July 21, 1982
- Former channel numbers: Analog: 25 (UHF, 1982–2009); Digital: 15 (UHF, 2002–2020)
- Former affiliations: NBC (sole affiliation 1982–1990; dual primary 1990–1993); ABC (dual primary, 1990–1993)

Technical information
- Licensing authority: FCC
- Facility ID: 73101
- ERP: 1,000 kW
- HAAT: 312 m (1,024 ft)
- Transmitter coordinates: 28°50′43.4″N 97°7′34″W

Links
- Public license information: Public file; LMS
- Website: www.crossroadstoday.com

KAVU-TV (channel 25) is a television station in Victoria, Texas, United States, affiliated with ABC. Owned by Morgan Murphy Media, it is the largest station in the Victoria Television Group, which also includes the low-power affiliates of NBC (KMOL-LD, channel 17), CBS (KXTS-LD, channel 41), Univision (KUNU-LD, channel 21), Telemundo (KVTX-LD, channel 45), and MeTV (KQZY-LD, channel 33); additionally, Morgan Murphy operates Fox affiliate KVCT (channel 19). The Victoria Television Group studios are located on North Navarro Street, with transmitter facilities on Farm to Market Road 236 west of the city.

KAVU-TV was established in 1982 as the second full-service TV station in Victoria. In 1989, a bank that came to have financial interests in KAVU and its primary competitor, KVCT, consolidated the two stations' assets into KAVU-TV and spun off the other station. In the 1990s, 2000s, and 2010s, KAVU-TV's owners expanded with additional low-power TV stations, creating the Victoria Television Group, which provides all major over-the-air television service to the city in a seven-station cluster that is the only known combination of the five major English and two Spanish networks in the United States, and also houses the area's only TV news department.

== History ==
=== Prior channel 25 permit and early years ===
In February 1969, the Federal Communications Commission (FCC) granted a construction permit to John J. "Joe" Tibiletti, owner of radio station KTXN-FM, for a channel 25 television station—which applied for the KAVU-TV call letters. Tibiletti had pushed for the commission to assign a second channel to Victoria in 1963. Initially promising to operate a full-service station with possible network affiliation, Tibiletti sold the unbuilt construction permit to K-SIX Television, owners of Corpus Christi station KZTV, in 1971. The sale was never closed, and the commission dismissed Tibiletti's application for more time to build in 1974.

Interest around channel 25 arose again at the end of the 1970s. Two groups sought translators: Corpus Christi public television station KEDT and a husband and wife who proposed to rebroadcast KWEX-TV in San Antonio. By December 1980, however, an application for a new full-service television station on channel 25 had taken precedence, from Community Broadcasting of Coastal Bend, owned by the Constant family: Dr. George and his wife Ruth. This third filing snarled KEDT's plans to expand, even though the commission had granted a construction permit, because a grant of the Community Broadcasting application would bump KEDT's translator to another channel and created uncertainty around the investment; the South Texas Educational Broadcasting Council, owner of KEDT, sought to have channel 25 reserved for noncommercial use.

In September, the FCC awarded a construction permit to Community Broadcasting, which declared its intention to be on the air by July 4, 1982, preferably as a CBS affiliate. Selecting the call letters KAVU-TV, as had Tibiletti in 1969, the station signed an affiliation contract with NBC and began broadcasting July 21, 1982. The studios on Navarro Road, still used by the Victoria Television Group, had previously housed a Devereux Foundation school run by founder Dr. George Constant.

=== Bank ownership and consolidation with KVCT ===
Several years after launching, a dispute emerged affecting Community Broadcasting of Coastal Bend, rooted in a promissory note that was issued in March 1983 in order for new investors to buy into the station. In October 1987, the First Victoria National Bank sued channel 25, claiming that KAVU-TV investors had made false statements and misrepresentations in a suit they had filed against the bank two years prior. The station claimed the bank charged excessively high rates as part of its enforcement of what it called an illegal contract. Even as the litigation between KAVU-TV and the bank remained under a gag order, further issues arose when former general manager Richard Lee French, who owned 10.9 percent of the company, filed a challenge to its license renewal the next year. (The FCC denied the challenge, though French continued to contest several later actions.)

First Victoria filed in April 1989 to have the license transferred to it, a condition of a settlement in state court. Litigation remained pending in a parallel federal case.

In a late July status report in the federal case, which included one of French's filings, First Victoria's planned course of action was revealed, significantly altering the television landscape in Victoria. In addition to KAVU-TV, the bank also held a corporate interest in the ownership of KVCT, its direct competitor; the bank planned to consolidate the two stations, sell KAVU-TV to Withers Broadcasting as the only commercial television station in the market, and convert KVCT into a noncommercially operated outlet. The judge in the federal case would find that the sale to the bank violated the settlement of the state suit; as a result, he also ordered KAVU-TV to pay $28,000 in unpaid royalties to ASCAP.

In December 1989, sale contracts for both stations were filed with the FCC. KAVU-TV and the station's real estate assets sold for approximately $1.52 million, while KVCT sold for $1.5 million. Approval of the transactions was delayed, as Withers could not retain both licenses and needed to find a buyer for KVCT; the deal was approved after striking a deal with Jerianne Medley of Friendswood in March 1990.

The Withers purchase and KVCT divestiture were completed in early July 1990; on July 5, all of KVCT's sales staff and most of its news team reported to work at KAVU, and two months later, channel 25 became an affiliate of NBC and ABC, as KVCT became an independent Christian station. KAVU would retain this status until March 1993, when it became a sole ABC affiliate, citing the difficulties of scheduling two network lineups on one station.

Withers expanded its broadcasting holdings in the Victoria market when it took over the operations of KVCT, which had gone off the air for several months, under a local marketing agreement; the station reemerged in September 1994 as a Fox affiliate. The next year, it leased KTXN-FM, still owned by Tibiletti, and bought KNAL (1410 AM). Two years later, Withers acquired a pair of low-power television stations, on channels 27 and 59; one would offer Spanish-language programming.

=== Saga and Morgan Murphy ===
Saga Communications acquired KAVU-TV from Withers in 1998, making it the company's second television property after KOAM-TV in Joplin, Missouri. Channel 25 was sold, along with KNAL, for $11.875 million. Withers sold the stations only because of the perceived costs of the upcoming digital transition. The sale closed the next year, as Saga made a string of investments into the station and its local newscasts.

KAVU-TV was briefly carried in Corpus Christi in 2006 when Time Warner Cable (now Charter Spectrum) entered into a retransmission consent dispute with that city's ABC affiliate, KIII-TV. The station was not aware of the change until relatives of station employees who lived in the market told them that they enjoyed watching the KAVU morning newscast that day.

Under Saga, the Victoria Television Group continued to expand its suite of channels, adding an NBC affiliate (currently KMOL-LD) in 2001 after convincing the network of the growth potential of the market; at the same time, KVTX-LP became the area's Telemundo affiliate. Aided by changes made by the FCC, they also launched digital signals in time to meet the federal deadline that had prompted Withers to sell. In 2011, KXTS-LD, previously carrying MyNetworkTV, relaunched as the market's first CBS affiliate, giving the group all four major network affiliations in the market, plus Univision and Telemundo. In that year, KAVU alone accounted for two-thirds of all revenue among stations in the Victoria market, and its 6 p.m. local newscast earned a 47 share—representing nearly half of all households.

Previous logo until March 31, 2021.

Saga exited the television business in 2017 and sold its stations to Morgan Murphy Media.

== Subchannels ==
The station's signal is multiplexed:

Subchannels of KAVU-TV
Subchannel	Res.	Short name	Programming
25.1	720p	KAVU-HD	ABC
25.2	480i	KMOL-SD	NBC (KMOL-LD) in SD
25.3	480i	KXTS-SD	CBS (KXTS-LD) in SD
25.4	480i	25-NOW	25 Now
25.5	480i	ION	Ion

Simulcast of subchannel of another station
