= KPXL-TV =

Television station in Uvalde, Texas

- Uvalde–San Antonio, Texas; United States
- City: Uvalde, Texas
- Channels: Digital: 26 (UHF); Virtual: 26

Programming
- Affiliations: 26.1: Ion Television; for others, see § Subchannels

Ownership
- Owner: Ion Media; (Ion Television License, LLC)

History
- First air date: February 19, 1999
- Former channel numbers: Analog: 26 (UHF, 1999–2009)
- Call sign meaning: Pax TV

Technical information
- Licensing authority: FCC
- Facility ID: 61173
- ERP: 228 kW
- HAAT: 521 m (1,709 ft)
- Transmitter coordinates: 29°37′12″N 99°2′57.1″W

Links
- Public license information: Public file; LMS
- Website: iontelevision.com

KPXL-TV (channel 26) is a television station licensed to Uvalde, Texas, United States, broadcasting the Ion Television network to the San Antonio area. Owned by the Ion Media subsidiary of the E. W. Scripps Company, KPXL-TV maintains transmitter facilities off Highway 173/RM Road 689 on the Medina–Bandera county line (west-northwest of Lakehills).

== History ==
The station began broadcasting on February 19, 1999; it was built and signed on by Paxson Communications as an owned-and-operated station of the family-oriented Pax TV network (later reformatted into a general entertainment service as i: Independent Television, now Ion Television), with religious programming from The Worship Network airing during the overnight hours.

On September 24, 2020, the Cincinnati-based E. W. Scripps Company announced it would purchase KPXL-TV's owner, Ion Media, for $2.65 billion, with financing from Berkshire Hathaway. Part of the deal included divesting 23 stations nationally to Inyo Broadcast Holdings (then-undisclosed at the time of the announcement) that would maintain Ion affiliations.

== Newscasts ==
From 2000 to 2004, KPXL aired rebroadcasts of NBC affiliate KMOL-TV (channel 4)'s newscasts at 6:30 and 10:30 p.m. (KMOL-TV became WOAI-TV in 2002). KPXL was also an affiliate of The News of Texas from 1999 to 2000.

== Technical information ==
=== Subchannels ===
The station's signal is multiplexed:

Subchannels of KPXL-TV
Subchannel	Res.	Short name	Programming
26.1	720p	ION	Ion Television
26.2	480i	CourtTV	Court TV
26.3	480i	Laff	Laff
26.4	480i	Mystery	Ion Mystery
26.5	480i	IONPlus	Ion Plus
26.6	480i	BUSTED	Busted
26.7	480i	GameSho	Game Show Central
26.8	480i	HSN	HSN
26.9	480i	HSN2	HSN2

=== Analog-to-digital conversion ===
Because it was granted an original construction permit after the FCC finalized the DTV allotment plan on April 21, 1997, the station did not receive a companion channel for a digital television station. KPXL-TV discontinued regular programming on its analog signal, over UHF channel 26, on June 12, 2009. The station "flash-cut" its digital signal into operation UHF channel 26.
