= KORO (TV) =

Television station in Corpus Christi, Texas

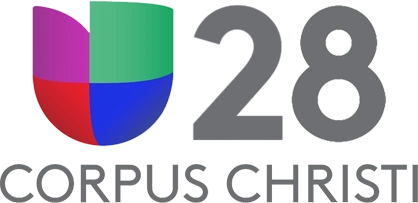
- Corpus Christi, Texas; United States
- Channels: Digital: 27 (UHF); Virtual: 28
- Branding: Univision 28 (general); Noticias Univision 28 (newscasts)

Programming
- Affiliations: 28.1: Univision; for others, see § Subchannels

Ownership
- Owner: Entravision Communications; (Entravision Holdings, LLC)
- Sister stations: KCRP-CD

History
- First air date: April 19, 1977
- Former channel numbers: Analog: 28 (UHF, 1977–2009)
- Call sign meaning: Oro is Spanish for gold

Technical information
- Licensing authority: FCC
- Facility ID: 64877
- ERP: 1,000 kW
- HAAT: 287.3 m (943 ft)
- Transmitter coordinates: 27°42′29″N 97°38′0″W

Links
- Public license information: Public file; LMS
- Website: noticiascorpuschristi.com

KORO (channel 28) is a television station in Corpus Christi, Texas, United States, affiliated with the Spanish-language network Univision. It is owned by Entravision Communications alongside low-power, Class A UniMás affiliate KCRP-CD (channel 41). The two stations share studios on North Mesquite Street in downtown Corpus Christi; KORO's transmitter is located between Petronila and Robstown.

== History ==
In 1972, two groups filed applications for channel 28 in Corpus Christi with the Federal Communications Commission (FCC). Both sought to build and operate a Spanish-language television station. One group, U-Anchor Broadcasting, was a subsidiary of an Amarillo-based firm, while the other, Telecorpus, consisted mostly of local stockholders, with notable Spanish International Network (SIN) executives—including Emilio Nicolas Sr. and Danny Villanueva—on its board. At the time, there was only one full-time Spanish-language TV station in the state of Texas, KWEX-TV in San Antonio. The FCC heard the mutually exclusive Telecorpus and U-Anchor applications in 1974, with the FCC giving the nod—and the construction permit—to Telecorpus in November.

Two and a half years passed before KORO was built and began broadcasting. Technical and legal delays, including a dispute over whether the local cable system could import the signals of Mexican television stations, pushed back the launch. However, concrete steps were taken during the course of 1976 to put the station into service after the FCC denied the cable company's proposal. These included negotiating for studio space and purchasing equipment. Three banks turned down the company for loans before a fourth was willing to lend.

KORO began broadcasting April 19, 1977, having missed its intended start date by three days due to a lightning strike on a microwave dish. The station originally broadcast from the 600 Building downtown, but the studios moved to the present Mesquite Street facility in 1982, a long-delayed move. The station's only live local newscast aired at 5 p.m. until 1997, when a 10 p.m. newscast began production.

Logo used until December 31, 2012

Citing consolidation and the expense of the eventual conversion to digital television, Telecorpus sold KORO to Entravision Communications in 1998.

== Technical information ==
=== Subchannels ===
The station's signal is multiplexed:

Subchannels of KORO
Subchannel	Res.	Short name	Programming
28.1	1080i	KORO-DT	Univision
28.2	480i	Mystery	Ion Mystery
28.3	480i	IONPlus	Ion Plus
28.5	480i	Bounce	Bounce TV
28.6	480i	Majstad	Majestad TV (4:3)

=== Analog-to-digital conversion ===
KORO shut down its analog signal, over UHF channel 28, on June 12, 2009, the official date on which full-power television stations in the United States transitioned from analog to digital broadcasts under federal mandate. The station's digital signal remained on its pre-transition UHF channel 27, using virtual channel 28.
