= K22JA-D =

Television station in Corpus Christi, Texas

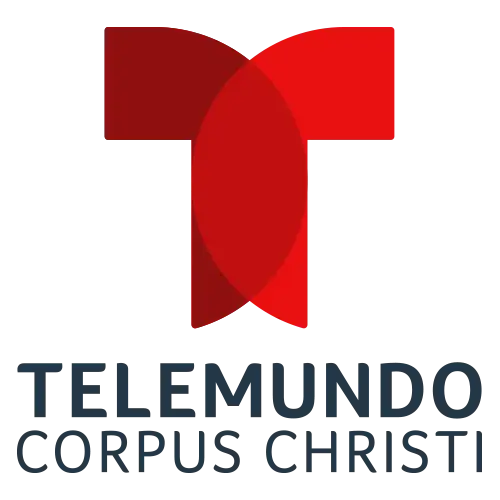

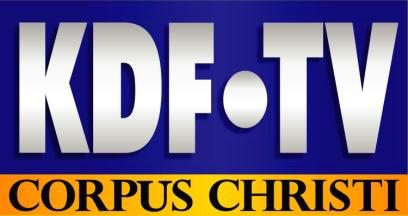
- Corpus Christi, Texas; United States
- Channels: Digital: 22 (UHF); Virtual: 47
- Branding: Telemundo Corpus Christi; KDF-TV (47.2)

Programming
- Affiliations: 47.1: Telemundo; 47.2: Independent

Ownership
- Owner: E. W. Scripps Company; (Scripps Broadcasting Holdings LLC)
- Sister stations: KRIS-TV, KZTV

History
- Founded: January 11, 1989
- First air date: June 28, 1991
- Former call signs: K47DF (1989–2014)
- Former channel numbers: Analog: 47 (UHF, 1991–2014)
- Former affiliations: Independent (1991–1993, 2008–2014); Telemundo (1993–1994); Fox (1994–2008); UPN (secondary, 1997−1998)

Technical information
- Licensing authority: FCC
- Facility ID: 51376
- ERP: 15 kW
- HAAT: 116.3 m (382 ft)
- Transmitter coordinates: 27°45′32.9″N 97°36′27.3″W
- Translator(s): see § Translators

Links
- Public license information: LMS
- Website: D1: www.telemundocc.com; D2: kztv10.com/on-kdf/

K22JA-D (channel 47) is a low-power television station in Corpus Christi, Texas, United States. It is owned by the E. W. Scripps Company alongside NBC affiliate KRIS-TV (channel 6) and operated with CBS affiliate KZTV (channel 10). The three stations share studios on Artesian Street in downtown Corpus Christi, where K22JA-D's transmitter is also located.

K22JA-D offers two subchannels, one affiliated with Telemundo (also known as "KAJA") and the other programmed as an independent station and branded as "KDF". The two services were once stations with separate licenses, combined in 2014. However, they have been commonly owned since the 1990s.

== History ==
=== Establishment ===
On January 11, 1989, the Roman Catholic Diocese of Corpus Christi started K47DF "KDF", which initially broadcast a family-oriented program lineup that also included religious shows. The construction permit had been sold to the diocese by KEDT public television. In 1991, the diocese opted to place KDF under a commercial subsidiary, Paloma Broadcasting, because of concerns that its growing income could affect the diocese's tax status.

KDF adopted an aggressive program acquisition strategy and snared the rights to major syndicated programs such as Wheel of Fortune and Jeopardy!, highly unusual for a low-power station. However, these programs led to KDF obtaining something rare for stations of its type: near-universal cable carriage.

=== Telemundo and Fox ===
In 1993, Paloma began a major expansion of its service. This included the creation of a new Telemundo station, K68DJ "KAJA", and the construction of translators for both KAJA and KDF at Bishop and between Beeville and Refugio. Another low-power station, K66EB, had previously been the Telemundo affiliate in Corpus Christi. The next year, KDF affiliated with Fox, which had only been available via either Foxnet or San Antonio's KRRT on the cable systems in the Coastal Bend region.

Logo as a Fox affiliate.

Paloma announced the sale of its stations in January 1997 to Miramar Broadcasting Company, in which one of the stockholders was KRIS owner T. Frank Smith. The venture was not profitable at the time, but the diocese had been forced to cut subsidies to Paloma after Texas attorney general Dan Morales sued, charging that funds in another foundation were being improperly used by the diocese. Paloma, which owed some $56,000 in state and county taxes and also had major program syndicators as creditors, then filed for bankruptcy at the end of the month. Under Miramar, KDF added a secondary affiliation with UPN. The Miramar stations were then included in Smith's sale of KRIS to Cordillera Communications in 1998.

On January 16, 2008, it was announced that KDF would lose its Fox affiliation in favor of new higher-powered KUQI, which began airing the network's programming starting on February 4, 2008, the day after Super Bowl XLII. At that time, KDF reverted to an independent.

K68DJ had applied to the Federal Communications Commission (FCC) for permission to move to UHF channel 43. As a low-power station, K68DJ was not required to broadcast digitally. On February 20, 2013, the FCC cancelled the station's license, citing operating on an out-of-core channel (52 to 69) and not having built a replacement facility after the December 31, 2011, deadline to cease broadcasting in that band. As a result of this notice, KAJA had ceased transmissions on K68DJ in January 2013; simultaneously, K47DF converted to digital as K47DF-D. It then moved to channel 22 in 2015 and went digital on a new channel as K22JA-D. In 2014, K22JA-D became the digital companion channel for K47DF as K47DF-D. KAJA can now be seen on K47DF-D 47.1 in 720p.

== Newscasts ==
In November 1993, KDF started a 9 p.m. local newscast, The Nine O'Clock News, which was hosted by former KRIS anchor Jay Ricci; originally 15 minutes in length, the program expanded to a full half-hour in January 1994. This moved to 10 p.m. later in 1994 and then ended in March 1995 for financial reasons.

After KRIS acquired KDF and KAJA outright, it expanded the existing KDF news product from 10 minutes to 30 in January 1999. Local news is also aired on the Telemundo subchannel at 5 and 10 p.m.

== Technical information ==
=== Subchannels ===
The station's signal is multiplexed:

Subchannels of K22JA-D
| Channel | Res. | Short name | Programming |
|---|---|---|---|
| 47.1 | 720p | KAJA | Telemundo |
| 47.2 | 480i | KDF | Independent ("KDF-TV") (4:3) |

=== Translators ===
- Beeville–Refugio: K09YZ-D
- Kingsville–Alice: K31KK-D

The Telemundo channel is also available as subchannel 10.2 of KZTV.
