= KZTV =

Television station in Corpus Christi, Texas

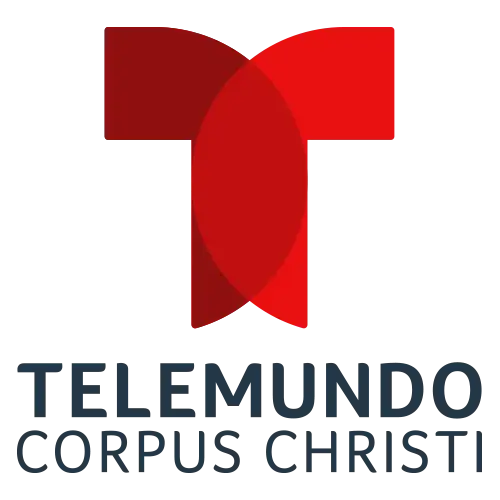
- Corpus Christi, Texas; United States
- Channels: Digital: 10 (VHF); Virtual: 10
- Branding: KZTV 10; Telemundo Corpus Christi (10.2)

Programming
- Affiliations: 10.1: CBS; 10.2: Telemundo; 10.3: Independent

Ownership
- Owner: SagamoreHill Broadcasting; (SagamoreHill of Corpus Christi Licenses, LLC)
- Operator: E. W. Scripps Company
- Sister stations: KRIS-TV, K22JA-D

History
- First air date: September 30, 1956
- Former call signs: KSIX-TV (1956–1957)
- Former channel numbers: Analog: 10 (VHF, 1956–2009); Digital: 18 (UHF, 2000–2009)
- Former affiliations: ABC (secondary, 1956–1964)
- Call sign meaning: K Z Television

Technical information
- Licensing authority: FCC
- Facility ID: 33079
- ERP: 39 kW
- HAAT: 289.8 m (951 ft)
- Transmitter coordinates: 27°42′29″N 97°38′0″W

Links
- Public license information: Public file; LMS
- Website: www.kztv10.com

KZTV (channel 10) is a television station in Corpus Christi, Texas, United States, affiliated with CBS. It is owned by SagamoreHill Broadcasting and operated by the E. W. Scripps Company alongside NBC affiliate KRIS-TV (channel 6) and low-power dual Telemundo affiliate/independent station K22JA-D (channel 47). The three stations share studios on Artesian Street in downtown Corpus Christi; KZTV's transmitter is located between Petronila and Robstown.

After one of the longest hearing processes for a TV station to that time, channel 10 was founded as KSIX-TV in September 1956 and changed its call sign to KZTV at the end of 1957. For its first 46 years of operation, it was owned by Corpus Christi businessman Vann Kennedy alongside KSIX radio. The station ran as a comparatively bare-bones effort: for 30 years, the newsroom and studio were in separate buildings, and Kennedy consistently underinvested in technology and appearance. It operated as a "teaching affiliate", with many reporters in their first or second job out of college. The station began broadcasting from its present studios on Artesian Street in 1986, though by that time, it was already a distant third in local news coverage.

Kennedy put KSIX, KZTV, and KVTV in Laredo up for sale in 2001, at the age of 95. The stations were purchased by Eagle Creek Broadcasting, a Michigan-based firm related to the Northwest Broadcasting group. Eagle Creek led a top-to-bottom overhaul of the news department, including new equipment, a news set, and personnel. In 2008, Eagle Creek reached a deal to sell the KZTV physical plant to Cordillera Communications, owner of KRIS-TV, while transferring the license to SagamoreHill. The deal was delayed by objections, but Cordillera began operating KZTV under contract for Eagle Creek in 2009; SagamoreHill became the licensee the next year. Scripps acquired Cordillera in 2018 and continues to provide services to KZTV.

== History ==
=== A long hearing ===
The end of the Federal Communications Commission (FCC)'s multi-year freeze on television station awards set off interest among multiple applicants in bringing stations to Corpus Christi. The FCC allocated two channels in the very high frequency (VHF) band, 6 and 10, and two in the ultra high frequency (UHF) band, educational 16 and 22. Between April 15, when the commission lifted the freeze, and July 1, when it started taking grants, applicants began to prepare bids. On July 1, the commission received a channel 10 filing from radio station KEYS. Later that month, Superior Television filed for the channel; it was owned by Jack Wrather and Helen Alvarez and was related to KOTV in Tulsa, Oklahoma, and KFMB-TV in San Diego. By the time the commission slated comparative hearings in June 1953, there were four applicants. KEYS and Superior were joined by the Corpus Christi Television Company, formed by three Texas oilmen, and K-SIX Television, Inc., a subsidiary of local radio station KSIX. KSIX had been founded in 1946 by Vann Kennedy, a longtime Texas journalist. From 1931 to 1942, Kennedy founded and ran the International News Service bureau in Austin, where he hired a young Walter Cronkite as a reporter; Cronkite worked for Kennedy for a year.

Corpus Christi Television Company dropped out within a month, leaving three applicants to contest the channel. Oral hearings were held by the commission between November 1953 and January 1954. FCC hearing examiner H. Gifford Irion issued his initial decision on January 21, 1955. He recommended K-SIX Television over the KEYS and Superior proposals; both losing parties announced their intention to appeal the examiner's findings, which lauded KSIX radio's record of community service and its proposed integration of ownership and management. The FCC's Broadcast Bureau also objected to the initial decision; it criticized the examiner's opinion of KSIX radio's local programming and said Superior should not only have been not selected but adversely found against based on statements made by Alvarez. The case, one of the longest in FCC history at the time, accumulated nearly 5,000 pages of testimony by September 1955, when the FCC heard final argument on the various appeals.

During this time, one Corpus Christi station got on the air by opting not for one of the two VHF channels and filing for UHF channel 22: KVDO-TV. However, across the country, UHF stations were having trouble competing in the same markets as VHF outlets. KVDO lobbied the FCC in November 1955 not to award either of the two VHF channels in Corpus Christi until it decided whether to continue mixing VHF and UHF locally or to make local television exist entirely on one band or the other. At the time, radio station KRIS was the only applicant for channel 6 but had yet to receive its permit. On December 7, the commission denied this request and approved KRIS-TV to begin broadcasting on channel 6.

=== Vann Kennedy ownership ===
On July 13, 1956, the FCC granted channel 10 to K-SIX Television; Kennedy opted to hold off on large construction in case any further appeals were filed. With the grant in hand, Kennedy recognized that a challenge from KVDO-TV was likely forthcoming; the UHF station had filed for relief against the new KSIX-TV, as it had done unsuccessfully against KRIS-TV. The FCC of the day generally did not act favorably on petitions to halt the progress of stations that were already on the air. As a result, beginning in early September, Kennedy resolved to build KSIX-TV as soon as possible. Engineers came from all over Texas and beyond, while tower work took place around the clock. On September 25, KVDO-TV filed a new petition with the commission challenging the KSIX-TV grant. Even though a part was missing from the station's tower, KSIX-TV went on the air on September 30, 1956. It took the CBS affiliation from KVDO-TV, which became an independent station as a result; KVDO-TV left the air a year later and did not reappear until 1964, when its backers were successful in a bid to move it to VHF channel 3 as KIII. The very next day, its attorneys informed the FCC that the challenge was moot because the station was on the air.

The station's call letters changed to the current KZTV on December 31, 1957, with the new designation debuting on air the next day. Though KZTV was touted as a shorter designation than KSIX-TV at the time, the designation also eliminated confusion with KRIS-TV on channel 6.

KZTV's first news director was a woman, Judy Wright; she had been running KSIX's radio news operation since 1950 and expanded her responsibilities to include television when channel 10 began. Initially, the news department showed strength; channel 10 had the highest-rated evening newscast in the market for 18 years, and in 1965, the Texas Association of Broadcasters recognized KZTV as having the best large-market newscast in the state.

The Kennedy media group expanded twice in the 1970s. KSIX-FM 93.9 began broadcasting on January 16, 1970; in 1985, the FM station, renamed KEXX-FM, was sold to the American Wireless Company, a Dallas-based investor consortium, and separated from KSIX radio and KZTV. A second television station joined the group in 1973, when KVTV was built in Laredo. The station originally rebroadcast most of KZTV's newscasts; the news was read from Laredo, and viewers joined KZTV for weather and sports. In the early 1980s, KVTV introduced full news programs originating in Laredo.

For decades, the station operated from two sites. The offices and newsgathering operation were downtown, first in the Showroom Building and then in the Wilson Building. The studio was at the transmitter site in Robstown, an arrangement that had been described as "temporary" when the station launched but persisted for decades; employees had to drive from Corpus Christi to Robstown to present the newscasts. Kennedy's conservative style of news presentation eschewed visuals; consequently, KZTV's newscasts began to sink in the ratings as KIII and KRIS offered more engaging newscasts while KZTV continued with its approach of using "less showmanship". In a 1981 article on changes to the newscasts at KIII and KRIS, Kennedy told the Corpus Christi Caller-Times, "We will continue to use our news veterans and keep our efforts on the content of the news rather than the cosmetics."

In 1986, a new studio and office complex was built in downtown Corpus Christi on Artesian Street. The 41,352-square-foot (3,841.7 m^{2}) facility provided two studios for news and commercial production as well as space for KSIX radio and equipment to improve the station's picture quality. Even then, little changed at KZTV. The station was the first in town with a satellite truck until Kennedy sold it, finding it was used too infrequently to justify its cost. The news programs lacked substantial local stories and relied on reports from CBS affiliates in other Texas cities. The station's logo remained untouched from the early 1980s to 2002; promotions were recycled because of a lack of staff to create new ones. Into the 1990s, the weather presenter read the current condition from dials, shown on the air, instead of a computer readout. Because the station paid less, it typically attracted entry-level employees, such as recent college graduates; it was a "teaching affiliate" for young journalists. The evening ratings reflected these resources: while KIII dominated and later battled KRIS for first, KZTV had one-fourth to one-fifth the viewership. However, the station continued to lead the ratings at noon, when veteran anchor Walter Furley read the news. Former station employees went as far as to tell the Caller-Times that they believed Kennedy would drop the news operation if CBS would let him.

In 1993, Kennedy and his counterparts at KIII and KRIS led a months-long dispute with cable systems in the market over retransmission consent payments for their signals, known locally as the "cable wars". The cable providers were not willing to pay a per-subscriber fee for the stations' programming: Kennedy told The New York Times, "To borrow from Ross Perot, that great sucking sound you hear is money being sucked out of this area and sent to Denver", in reference to the headquarters of Tele-Communications Inc., and characterized the dispute as an intellectual property matter. The dispute lasted six weeks and was the longest of its type after the introduction of retransmission consent; in addition, the Department of Justice brought an antitrust lawsuit against the stations, which was settled.

=== Eagle Creek ownership and rebuild ===
In February 2001, Vann Kennedy—at the age of 95—put his media properties up for sale, citing his advancing age and his wife Mary's recent heart attacks. Mary Kennedy died in December 2001. In January 2002, Michigan-based Eagle Creek Broadcasting purchased KZTV, KSIX, and KVTV for $11.5 million. The three-investor consortium included Jim Withers, a partner in local radio station owner Pacific Broadcasting, and Brian Brady, who was president of Northwest Broadcasting. Eagle Creek immediately sold KSIX to Pacific Broadcasting; it had not planned to keep the radio station.

Eagle Creek conducted a top-to-bottom overhaul of KZTV's news department. Furley delivered his final newscast on May 31, 2002, ending a 45-year career with the station. The relaunched CBS 10 News debuted on October 21, 2002, after a $2 million investment in new equipment and a new news set which featured two levels and a revolving desk. It was the station's first set overhaul since moving into the Artesian Street facility. Ratings did not rise: in the February 2003 Nielsen sweeps, KZTV attracted 5% of the 10 p.m. news audience compared to the market leaders, KRIS and KIII, which had 35 and 31 percent respectively. In 2005, the station changed its branding again to Action 10 News, though it remained a distant third.

=== Operation by KRIS-TV ===
On July 28, 2008, Eagle Creek announced that it had sold most of KZTV's assets and physical plant to Cordillera Communications. To comply with FCC rules, the license would instead be sold to SagamoreHill Broadcasting; the two transactions totaled $20 million. McKinnon Broadcasting, owner of KIII, objected to the sale. This objection held up the deal until August 24, 2009, when Eagle Creek announced a shared services agreement (SSA) with KRIS-TV; Cordillera acquired all station assets with Eagle Creek owning KZTV's broadcast license. Several KZTV employees were laid off.

SagamoreHill finally assumed ownership of the KZTV license on May 19, 2010. In September, KRIS-TV moved its newsgathering operations from its prior studios on Staples Street into KZTV's building on Artesian, though business functions had been migrating to the KZTV facility since the prior January.

On October 29, 2018, Cordillera announced the sale of its entire station group, including KZTV's SSA partner KRIS-TV, to the E. W. Scripps Company; the SSA involving KZTV was included in the deal. The sale was completed on May 1, 2019. As of September 2023, the station aired 19 1/2 hours a week of local newscasts.

Beginning in October 2023, the dedicated newscasts for KZTV were replaced by simulcasts or replays of KRIS's newscasts.

== Technical information ==
=== Subchannels ===
KZTV's transmitter is located southwest of Corpus Christi, between Petronila and Robstown. The station's signal is multiplexed:

Subchannels of KZTV
Subchannel	Res.	Short name	Programming
10.1	1080i	KZTV-DT	CBS
10.2	480i	KAJA	Telemundo (K22JA-D)
10.3	480i	KDF	"KDF-TV" (Independent)

Simulcast of subchannels of another station

=== Analog-to-digital conversion ===
KZTV shut down its analog signal, over VHF channel 10, on June 12, 2009, the official date on which full-power television stations in the United States transitioned from analog to digital broadcasts under federal mandate. The station's digital signal relocated from its pre-transition UHF channel 18 to VHF channel 10 for post-transition operations.
