= KMOL-LD =

Television station in Victoria, Texas

- Victoria, Texas; United States
- Channels: Digital: 17 (UHF); Virtual: 17
- Branding: NBC 17

Programming
- Affiliations: 17.1: NBC; 17.2: Movies!

Ownership
- Owner: Morgan Murphy Media; (QueenB Television of Texas, LLC)
- Sister stations: KVCT, KUNU-LD, KAVU-TV, KQZY-LD, KXTS-LD, KVTX-LD

History
- Founded: November 29, 2001
- First air date: October 5, 2004
- Former call signs: K17FS (2001–2004); KMOL-LP (2004–2012)
- Call sign meaning: Repurposed former calls from WOAI-TV in San Antonio between 1974 and 2002

Technical information
- Licensing authority: FCC
- Facility ID: 128455
- Class: LD
- ERP: 15 kW
- HAAT: 312.3 m (1,025 ft)
- Transmitter coordinates: 28°50′43.4″N 97°7′34″W
- Translator(s): KAVU-TV 25.2 Victoria

Links
- Public license information: LMS
- Website: www.crossroadstoday.com

KMOL-LD (channel 17) is a low-power television station in Victoria, Texas, United States, affiliated with NBC. It is owned by Morgan Murphy Media alongside ABC affiliate KAVU-TV (channel 25) and four other low-power stations: Univision affiliate KUNU-LD (channel 21), MeTV affiliate KQZY-LD (channel 33), CBS affiliate KXTS-LD (channel 41), and Telemundo affiliate KVTX-LD (channel 45). Morgan Murphy Media also provides certain services to Fox affiliate KVCT (channel 19) under a local marketing agreement (LMA) with SagamoreHill Broadcasting. All of the stations share studios on North Navarro Street in Victoria and transmitter facilities on Farm to Market Road 236 west of the city.

KMOL-LP has operated since October 5, 2004.

Unlike most NBC affiliates, KMOL-LD does not carry newscasts, with KAVU-TV's Good Morning America local cut-ins also being broadcast at the same time during The Today Show, along with a short forecast update before prime time.

== Subchannels ==
The station's signal is multiplexed:

Subchannels of KMOL-LD
Channel	Res.	Short name	Programming
17.1	1080i	KMOL-HD	NBC
17.2	480i	KMOL-SD	Movies!
