= The News of Texas =

Statewide TV newscast in Texas (1999–2000)

- 1999 open graphics to The News of Texas
- Genre: Television newscast
- Country of origin: United States

Production
- Production location: Hollywood Park, Texas

Original release
- Network: Texas Network
- Release: January 18, 1999 – July 31, 2000

The News of Texas is a statewide newscast in Texas that was syndicated to 27 affiliate stations in the state by the San Antonio-based Texas Network (TXN) between January 18, 1999, and July 31, 2000. TXN was founded by James R. Leininger, a San Antonio physician and conservative political donor. It was co-founded by Mike Arnold, a 28-year-old entrepreneur, and Bob Rogers, a longtime San Antonio news executive. The program provided in-depth news and feature coverage focusing on Texas issues. However, it expanded quickly and faced difficulty attracting viewers in large markets in the state. Unable to accrue advertising revenue, TXN shut down in 2000.

== Launch ==
The Texas Network was founded by San Antonio physician and conservative political donor James R. Leininger, who invested $10 million into the product, and Mike Arnold, an entrepreneur and founding editor of The Lone Star Report. Arnold took the position of Chief Operating Officer and recruited Bob Rogers, the former vice president of San Antonio's KENS TV, to serve as co-founder and CEO. Rogers conducted surveys in 1998 that found that 77 percent of Texans wanted more statewide news coverage. The project pivoted from a daily newspaper to television after determining that TV news offered greater revenue potential.

The News of Texas debuted on January 18, 1999, in 17 of the state's 20 markets. The program originated from studios in Hollywood Park, near San Antonio, in rebuilt facilities that had housed Christian station KHCE-TV. The company maintained news bureaus in Austin, Dallas–Fort Worth, Houston, and San Antonio, as well as three satellite trucks positioned throughout the state to provide newsgathering facilities. The news program was updated nine times a day, and local stations could also incorporate stories from TXN into their own newscasts. Technically, TXN was an all-digital operation, with the final studio equipment setup coming into use in September 1999.

In September 1999, TXN expanded from television news to radio products and a newswire for newspapers and the internet, with a view to serving media outlets in mid-sized Texas cities.

The News of Texas was generally well received. In retrospect, the San Antonio Current hailed TXN for its "remarkably competent broadcast journalists and highly talented video shooters on staff". Jeanne Jakle of the San Antonio Express-News found its dedication to stories in Texas "refreshing" and the content informative. There was one notable incident where a TXN reporter mailed out postcards to the state's sex offenders with the Texas Department of Public Safety on the return address and no markings indicating the mailings came from the news organization; TXN suspended the reporter.

TXN was not the only startup seeking to cover Texas news to debut in 1999. On January 1, the Belo Corporation, which owned stations in Dallas, Houston, and San Antonio, started Texas Cable News (TXCN), a regional 24-hour news channel. Belo did not own an Austin station at the network's launch, but it traded for Austin ABC affiliate KVUE in a deal announced in February 1999. The similarity of the names of TXN and TXCN led to a lawsuit filed by Belo in November 1998, shortly before both services launched, with both companies disagreeing about the timing of the award of service marks related to their respective products.

== Distribution challenges and closure ==
When The News of Texas launched in January 1999, it was missing in three markets: Houston, Austin, and Sherman. The Houston gap was filled a month after launch when independent station KTBU-TV picked up the program, airing five live editions a day of The News of Texas; the Houston bureau moved into KTBU's facilities. The stations included a mix of network and non-network affiliates; the original Dallas–Fort Worth carrier was CBS station KTVT, while KMOL-TV aired its stories but not full newscasts in the San Antonio area. However, after ten months, the program moved from KTVT to KSTR, an independent station. Austin proved to be a major struggle: in November 1999, the network finally secured a slot on KLRU, Austin's PBS station, where The News of Texas would air without commercials. The evening edition was to begin to air on KLRN, the PBS station in San Antonio, in July 2000; this would be an upgrade over KPXL-TV, the Pax station, where it had been airing in an early morning timeslot among infomercials. KPXL also broadcast A Week in Review, TXN's weekly news wrap-up show. Late in its life, one other issue cropped up internally. In June 2000, TXN dismissed an unspecified number of employees in the wake of positive drug tests, while others walked off the job; Rogers claimed it had always required drug testing but had not been able to enforce the mandate because it was in a "hiring frenzy".

On July 31, 2000, after losing $45 million in news and even after an eleventh-hour restructuring which saw the layoffs of 40 of 120 staffers and the discontinuation of radio and internet divisions, The News of Texas signed off the air and TXN folded, leaving 13 affiliates to replace the programs it offered and 80 people out of work. Rogers noted that advertisers were slow to accept "something that was never seen before", while news director Bruce Kates noted the program was failing to attract viewers in Dallas and Houston the way it was in smaller markets like Amarillo, Beaumont, and San Angelo; the advertisers wanted better ratings in the larger markets. The Current blamed mismanagement and poor strategic planning by Leininger, in contrast to the more experienced executive team at Belo and TXCN.
