= KSIX (AM) =

Sports radio station in Corpus Christi, Texas

- Corpus Christi, Texas; United States
- Broadcast area: Corpus Christi, Texas
- Frequency: 1230 kHz
- Branding: Sports Radio Corpus Christi

Programming
- Format: Sports
- Affiliations: SportsMap, Westwood One

Ownership
- Owner: Gregory Herrman; (Dynamic Media, LLC)

History
- First air date: September 1947

Technical information
- Licensing authority: FCC
- Facility ID: 13964
- Class: C
- Power: 720 watts
- Transmitter coordinates: 27°47′3.1″N 97°27′28″W
- Translators: 95.1 K236CM (Corpus Christi); 95.9 K240FE (Corpus Christi)

Links
- Public license information: Public file; LMS
- Website: www.sportsradiocc.com

KSIX (1230 AM) is a radio station broadcasting a local sports format featuring one local show The Pudge Show as well as The Dan Patrick Show, The Jim Rome Show, and night and weekend programing from SportsMap. KSIX also airs programming from Westwood One. Licensed to Corpus Christi, Texas, the station is owned by Gregory Herrman, through licensee Dynamic Media, LLC. The station is also simulcast on 95.1 FM and 96.1 FM in Corpus Christi.

== Programming ==
KSIX has one local talk show: The Pudge Show.

KSIX live sports programing includes the Houston Texans, the Houston Rockets, and the Houston Astros. KSIX is the only station in the Houston Astros Radio Network to broadcast every season since the team came into the league as the Houston Colt .45s.

In addition to the team broadcast rights, KSIX also carries the NFL on Westwood One Sports, the NCAA Basketball Tournament, and Westwood One coverage of college football and basketball.
