= SagamoreHill Broadcasting =

American television broadcast company

SagamoreHill Broadcasting LLC
- Type: Private
- Founded: 2003; 23 years ago
- Headquarters: Augusta, Georgia, United States
- Key people: Louis Wall (CEO)
- Owners: Duff Ackerman & Goodrich; Louis Wall

SagamoreHill Broadcasting LLC is a privately held American holding company that owns 13 television stations based in the Great Lakes and southern United States regions. Headquartered in Augusta, Georgia, the company is a joint venture of the investment firm Duff Ackerman & Goodrich of San Francisco, California and former Benedek Broadcasting and Spartan Communications executive Louis Wall (who is also CEO of the group).

== History ==
The company was founded in 2003.

In 2005, SagamoreHill Broadcasting acquired KXLT-TV in Rochester, Minnesota as a result of Quincy Newspapers' purchase of Shockley Communications (the former owner of KXLT-TV), and Quincy could not buy KXLT outright due to Federal Communications Commission (FCC) rules governing duopolies.

In 2007, SagamoreHill Broadcasting acquired WLTZ in Columbus, Georgia from J. Curtis Lewis.

On July 23, 2008, SagamoreHill Broadcasting acquired the license of KZTV in Corpus Christi, Texas to comply with Federal Communications Commission (FCC) rules; it was originally sold by Eagle Creek Broadcasting (KZTV's former owner) to Cordillera Communications. However, the application to sell the station was opposed by McKinnon Broadcasting, then-owner of KIII. This objection held up the deal until August 24, 2009, when Eagle Creek announced a shared services agreement with KRIS-TV. Cordillera acquired all station assets with Eagle Creek owning KZTV's broadcast license. SagamoreHill finally assumed ownership of the KZTV license on May 19, 2010.

In 2017, the company acquired the license assets of Surtsey Media/Saga Communications' television clusters in Joplin, Missouri, including KOAM-TV, and Victoria, Texas, including KAVU-TV. SagamoreHill became the owner of KFJX in Joplin, Missouri, and KVCT in Victoria, Texas; both stations are operated by Morgan Murphy Media.

On May 3, 2023, the company acquired WPXO-LD for $405,000, due to the previous owner, Caribevision Station Group, being in debt. The deal was finalized in late 2023, and the station has since converted from América TeVé to a JTV affiliate.

In 2025, the company reached an agreement with Gray Media to sell WLTZ and KJTV-TV.

== Stations ==
=== Current ===
City of license / Market	Station	Channel; TV (RF)	Owned since	Network affiliation
Montgomery, AL	WNCF	32 (31)	2004 (Note: Operated by Bahakel Communications through a shared services agreement (SSA).)	ABC
Gainesville, FL	WSHX-LD	29 (28)	2022	Univision
Panama City, FL	WSDW-LD	20 (20)	2022	Univision
Tallahassee, FL	WXTL-LD	36 (36)	2022	Univision
Boise, ID	KEVA-LD	34 (34)	2023	Univision
Springfield, IL	WXSG-LD	27 (27)	2021	Shop LC
Sioux City, IA	KSXE-LD	16 (16)	2022	Grit
Lawrence/Topeka, KS	KGKT-LD	39 (14)	2025	Telemundo
Pittsburg, KS–Joplin, MO	KFJX	14 (13)	2017 (Note: Operated by Morgan Murphy Media through an SSA.)	Fox; The CW (DT2)
DeRidder, LA	K30QV-D	30 (30)	2010	CBS; Telemundo (LD2); MeTV (LD3)
Lake Charles, LA	KSWL-LD	17 (34)	2019	CBS
Lake Charles, LA	KWWE-LD	19 (19)	2019	MyNetworkTV/MeTV; Telemundo (LD3)
Duluth, MN	KMYN-LD	32 (32)	2023	Telemundo
St. Cloud–Minneapolis, MN	KMWE-LD	17 (17)	2021	Telemundo
Rochester, MN	KXSH-LD	35 (35)	2021	Telemundo
Columbia - Jefferson City, MO	KGKM-LD	36 (36)	2022	Telemundo; Ion (LD2)
Kansas City, MO	KGKC-LD	39 (33)	2018	Telemundo
St. Louis, MO	WXSL-LD	14 (21)	2021	Telemundo
East Orange, NJ - New York, NY	WNYX-LD	34 (4)	2023	Purple TV
Potsdam, NY	WVNV-LD	45 (26)	2024	NBC
Watertown, NY	WVNC-LD	45 (24)	2016	NBC
Watertown, NY	WTKJ-LD	19 (19)	2024	NBC
Eugene, OR	KCKW-LD	25 (25)	2023	Telemundo
Portland, OR	KJYY-LD	29 (29)	2021	Telemundo
Salem, OR	KJWY-LD	36 (21)	2018	Telemundo
Pierre, SD	K32FW-D	32 (32)	2023	Purple TV
Jackson, TN	W17EI-D	17 (17)	2022	Silent
Jackson, TN	W18EW-D	18 (18)	2022	Silent
Beaumont - Port Arthur, TX	KJYK-LD	19 (19)	2022	Telemundo
Beaumont - Port Arthur, TX	K02RA-D	2 (2)	2010	Silent
Beaumont - Port Arthur, TX	KGEW-LD	33 (33)	2021	Telemundo
Corpus Christi, TX	KZTV	10 (10)	2010 (Note: Operated by the E. W. Scripps Company through an SSA.)	CBS
Victoria, TX	KVCT	19 (11)	2017	Fox; The CW (DT3)
Spokane, WA	KDYS-LD	32 (32)	2025	Telemundo

=== Former ===
Media market	State	Station	Purchased	Sold	Notes
Montgomery	Alabama	WBMM	2006	2011	
Phoenix	Arizona	KASW	2014	2015	(Note: Under SagamoreHill ownership, it was operated by Meredith Corporation through an SSA.)
Rehoboth Beach	Delaware	WRDE-LD	2016	2019	
Columbus	Georgia	WLTZ	2007	2026	(Note: Operated by Gray Media through an SSA.)
Fort Wayne	Indiana	WISE-TV	2015	2018	
Ottumwa, IA	Iowa	KGLU-LD	2017	2018	
Duluth	Minnesota	KDLH	2015	2018	
Rochester	Minnesota	KXLT-TV	2005	2025	
Myrtle Beach	South Carolina	WWMB	2005	2013	(Note: Under SagamoreHill ownership, it was operated by Barrington Broadcasting through an SSA.)
Laredo	Texas	KGNS-TV	2005	2013	
Lubbock	Texas	KJTV-CD	2020	2026	
Lubbock	Texas	KJTV-TV	2020	2026	
Cheyenne	Wyoming	KGWN-TV	2004	2013	
Scottsbluff	Nebraska	KSTF	2004	2013	(Note: Semi-satellite of KGWN-TV.)
