= KETX (TV) =

Television station in Tyler, Texas (1953–1954)

- Tyler, Texas; United States
- Channels: Analog: 19 (UHF)

Programming
- Affiliations: NBC, CBS, DuMont

Ownership
- Owner: Jacob A. Newborn, Jr.

History
- First air date: September 19, 1953
- Last air date: October 24, 1954; (1 year, 35 days)

Technical information
- ERP: 270 kW
- HAAT: 900 ft (274 m)

KETX (channel 19) was a television station in Tyler, Texas, United States, which operated between September 1953 and October 1954. It was the first television station in East Texas and the first UHF station in the entire state; however, its operation was fraught with technical and financial difficulties, and the coming of a VHF station, KLTV, was an existential threat to the smaller UHF outlet, causing its closure.

== History ==
Jacob A. Newborn applied for a television station on channel 19 in Tyler in November 1952. Newborn also owned KBMT at Beaumont and held a permit to build a station in Gadsden, Alabama. Plans for the station included studios in Tyler and Longview as well as a larger studio at the transmitter near Gladewater. Facility construction began in July with the deliveries of the transmitter and the antenna. A month before, the two-story transmitter and studio building at Gladewater were completed in just three days.

Limited programs began to air on September 19, 1953, though at low power for more than a month upon signing on. As the first station in Tyler, it immediately was reported to have picked up affiliations with all networks, though it was a non-interconnected affiliate. Even though Tyler was on the network coaxial cable that ran from Dallas to Shreveport, the networks did not want to connect a station there until it could reach 20,000 TV homes. It would not be until January 3, 1954, that KETX joined CBS by airing network shows on film, along with NBC and DuMont leading to expanded operating hours.

Even though KETX-TV was on the air at full power and airing network shows, problems were emerging. On March 24, 1954, the station did not sign on and it was reported that Newborn had offered to either let the employees buy KETX-TV or to find another buyer for the operation. In wiring the FCC, Newborn explained the silence as arising from a failure in a heat exchanger unit, but the station returned to the air on March 26. Signs of financial problems came to light the next week when a $1,700 civil action was filed against KETX and Newborn for failure to pay a promissory note. Two larger filings followed in early April: one from transmitter manufacturer General Electric which filed a $344,000 suit and sought foreclosure on the equipment it had sold KETX, while three contractors presented an $11,000 petition to force KETX into involuntary bankruptcy.

KETX's financial problems were soon compounded by the imminent arrival of a licensee for the only VHF allocation at Tyler, KLTV. Recognizing that a VHF competitor presented an existential threat to his station, Newborn closed KETX-TV on October 23, less than two weeks after KLTV launched on October 14, while he pursued a bid to move the channel 9 allocation at Lufkin to Tyler. (KLTV's arrival also prompted legal action from the other operating UHF, Longview's KTVE.) The FCC denied the Newborn proposal for channel 9 in November and reaffirmed its grant of a construction permit to Forest Capital Broadcasting Company for KTRE.

While KETX never returned to air, Newborn faced continued financial proceedings stemming from the former television station's liabilities. In February 1955, two film distributors sued Newborn for nearly $6,000 in unreturned film rentals. Newborn ultimately filed a voluntary bankruptcy petition in March, by which time he had $23,000 in assets and $164,000 in liabilities.
