= McKinnon Broadcasting =

American television broadcast company

McKinnon Broadcasting Company
- Trade name: Texas Television, Inc.
- Company type: Private
- Industry: Mass media
- Founded: 1962
- Founder: Clinton D. McKinnon
- Defunct: 2023
- Fate: Last remaining television station acquired by Nexstar Media Group
- Headquarters: San Diego, California, United States
- Area served: United States, Mexico
- Key people: Michael D. McKinnon, president/CEO
- Products: Broadcast television

McKinnon Broadcasting Company (doing business as Texas Television, Inc.) was a privately owned television broadcasting company based in San Diego, California, founded by Clinton D. McKinnon. Michael Dean McKinnon Sr., his son, was the company's majority owner, president, chief executive officer (CEO), and chairman of the board.

The company exited broadcasting and media altogether after the sale of its flagship station KUSI-TV to Nexstar Media Group was completed on September 2, 2023.

== Former stations ==
- Stations are arranged in alphabetical order by state and city of license.
- Two boldface asterisks appearing following a station's call letters (**) indicate a station built and signed on by McKinnon Broadcasting.
- Does not include KVOA-TV in Tucson and KOAT-TV in Albuquerque. (Note: From 1955 to 1962, KVOA-TV and KOAT-TV were owned by Alvarado Television, a separate company with Clinton McKinnon as its president.)

Stations owned by McKinnon Broadcasting
Media market	State	Station	Purchased	Sold	Notes
San Diego	California	KUSI-TV	1982	2023	(Note: McKinnon Broadcasting provided technical support and was a minority owner of KUSI-TV at launch; it acquired the license outright from United States International University in 1990.)
Beaumont–Port Arthur	Texas	KBMT	1977	2009	
Corpus Christi	Texas	KIII **	1964	2010	
Victoria	Texas	KXIX **	1969	1976	(Note: KXIX (now KVCT) was a satellite of KIII in Corpus Christi.)

Michael McKinnon, through the Austin Television Company, also had partial ownership of KBVO-TV (Note: Not related to the present-day KBVO that serves Austin, but is licensed to Llano.) (now KEYE-TV) in Austin from 1983 to 1995.

== Magazines ==
=== Former ===
- San Diego Home/Garden Lifestyles
