= KSCC =

Television station in Corpus Christi, Texas

- Corpus Christi, Texas; United States
- Channels: Digital: 19 (UHF); Virtual: 38
- Branding: KSCC Fox 38; CW Corpus Christi (38.3)

Programming
- Affiliations: 38.1: Fox; 38.3: The CW Plus (primary)/MyNetworkTV (secondary); for others, see § Subchannels

Ownership
- Owner: Sinclair Broadcast Group; (KUQI Licensee, LLC)

History
- Founded: May 12, 2006
- First air date: January 15, 2008
- Former call signs: KUQI (2006–2017)
- Former channel numbers: Analog: 38 (UHF, 2008–2009); Digital: 38 (UHF, 2009–2020)
- Former affiliations: Independent (January–February 2008)
- Call sign meaning: Sinclair Corpus Christi

Technical information
- Licensing authority: FCC
- Facility ID: 82910
- ERP: 350 kW
- HAAT: 247 m (810 ft)
- Transmitter coordinates: 27°45′32.9″N 97°36′27.3″W

Links
- Public license information: Public file; LMS
- Website: fox38corpuschristi.com

KSCC (channel 38) is a television station in Corpus Christi, Texas, United States, affiliated with Fox, The CW Plus and MyNetworkTV. Owned by Sinclair Broadcast Group, the station maintains studios on South Padre Island Drive in Corpus Christi, and its transmitter is located southeast of Robstown.

Because KSCC is a full-power television station, its signal covers the Corpus Christi metropolitan area, as well as outlying towns as far as Raymondville and George West. The coverage area is far greater than that of the market's original Fox affiliate, low-power K47DF (channel 47, now a Telemundo affiliate).

KSCC was also used to provide full-market over-the-air 16:9 widescreen standard definition digital coverage of two co-owned low-power analog stations (on its two subchannels): TBD owned-and-operated station KXPX-LP (simulcast over KSCC-DT2) and MyNetworkTV affiliate KTOV-LP (simulcast over KSCC-DT3). This ended when the low-power stations' licenses were turned in on April 3, 2018; both now operate solely as subchannels of KSCC.

== History ==
The station began operations on January 15, 2008, as independent station KUQI; it assumed the Fox affiliation for the market on February 4, 2008, the day after Super Bowl XLII, replacing K47DF as the area's affiliate. KUQI began broadcasting Fox programming in HD by 2011. The original owner was High Maintenance Broadcasting, a company run by Deidre Gillis, Lori Hoffmann and Vanisha Mallory.

On March 15, 2012, National Communications announced it would purchase KUQI from High Maintenance Broadcasting with an intent to enter into a shared services agreement with London Broadcasting, then-owner of local ABC affiliate KIII (channel 3). On August 28, 2012, the Federal Communications Commission (FCC) approved the sale of KUQI, with plans for the station to change its call sign from KUQI to KFCC upon consummation. However, the sale to National Communications was canceled on January 11, 2013; the National/London consortium cited numerous attempts to close the deal with High Maintenance without success.

High Maintenance then declared bankruptcy in early 2013, remaining as debtor-in-possession. In late 2014, the sale of the station to Corpus 18, LLC, a partnership formed by the noteholders of debt of High Maintenance and related company GH Broadcasting, was finalized. On October 2, 2015, Corpus 18 agreed to sell KUQI, KXPX-LP (channel 14), and KTOV-LP (channel 21) to Sinclair Broadcast Group for $9.25 million. The sale was completed on January 8, 2016. The station changed its call sign to KSCC on October 11, 2017.

On July 31, 2024, it was announced that KSCC would affiliate with The CW, taking the affiliation from KRIS-DT2 and adding it to its MyNetworkTV subchannel (KSCC-DT3) as a primary affiliate.

== News programming ==
KSCC does not currently have a news department, but it did simulcast the 9 p.m. newscast from Fox owned-and-operated station KRIV in Houston, advertised by KUQI under the title KUQI Tonight powered by Fox 26. The simulcast ended on June 28, 2012, due to the then-planned sale of the station. Upon Sinclair's assumption of ownership, the station began to simulcast morning programming from sister Fox station KABB in San Antonio, including the 7–9 a.m. block of Fox News First, and Daytime with Kimberly & Esteban.

== Technical information ==
=== Subchannels ===
Subchannels of KSCC
| Channel | Res. | Short name | Programming |
|---|---|---|---|
| 38.1 | 720p | FOX | Fox |
| 38.2 | 480i | TBD | Roar |
| 38.3 | 480i | CW MyTV | The CW Plus/MyNetworkTV |
| 38.4 | 480i | Charge! | Charge! |
| 38.5 | 480i | Comet | Comet |
| 38.6 | 480i | TheNest | The Nest |

=== Analog-to-digital conversion ===
KSCC (as KUQI) shut down its analog signal, over UHF channel 38, on June 12, 2009, and "flash-cut" its digital signal into operation UHF channel 38. Because it was granted an original construction permit after the FCC finalized the DTV allotment plan on April 21, 1997, the station did not receive a companion channel for a digital television station.
