= KCRP-CD =

Television station in Corpus Christi, Texas

- Corpus Christi, Texas; United States
- Channels: Digital: 17 (UHF); Virtual: 41
- Branding: UniMás Corpus Christi

Programming
- Affiliations: 41.1: UniMás; 41.2: LATV

Ownership
- Owner: Entravision Communications; (Entravision Holdings, LLC)

History
- Founded: July 31, 1986
- First air date: January 2, 1991
- Former call signs: K22BH (1986–2000); K41FO (2000–2001); KCRP-LP (2001); KCRP-CA (2001–2015)
- Former channel numbers: Analog: 22 (UHF, 1991–2001), 41 (UHF, 2001–2015); Digital: 41 (UHF, 2015–2019)
- Former affiliations: Music videos (1991–1995); The WB (1995–1998); Independent (1998–2002); TeleFutura (2002–2013)
- Call sign meaning: ICAO airport code for Corpus Christi International Airport

Technical information
- Licensing authority: FCC
- Facility ID: 48833
- Class: CD
- ERP: 15 kW
- HAAT: 99.6 m (327 ft)
- Transmitter coordinates: 27°46′11.1″N 97°26′55.9″W

Links
- Public license information: Public file; LMS
- Website: noticiasya.com/corpus-christi

KCRP-CD (channel 41) is a low-power, Class A television station in Corpus Christi, Texas, United States, affiliated with the Spanish-language network UniMás. It is owned by Entravision Communications alongside Univision affiliate KORO (channel 28). The two stations share studios on North Mesquite Street in downtown Corpus Christi; KCRP-CD's transmitter is located on Navigation Boulevard on the city's west side.

== History ==
The station was founded on July 31, 1986, under call sign K22BH and began broadcasting on January 2, 1991, showing music videos. On January 11, 1995, the station joined The WB upon the network's launch; on September 21, 1998, the station dropped WB programming (when cable-only "KWDB" launched) and became an independent station. On May 8, 2000, it changed the call sign to K41FO. On June 14, 2001, it became KCRP-LP and then became KCRP-CA on November 13 that year. In 2002, the station joined TeleFutura; after TeleFutura became UniMás in 2013, the station became an affiliate of the new network. On June 3, 2015, the station was licensed for digital operation and changed the call sign to the current KCRP-CD.

== Subchannels ==
The station's signal is multiplexed:

Subchannels of KCRP-CD
Channel	Res.	Short name	Programming
41.1	1080i	UniMas	UniMás
41.2	480i	LATV	LATV
41.88	1080i	AltaVsn	AltaVision

Subchannel broadcast with MPEG-4 video
