= KIII =

Television station in Corpus Christi, Texas

- Corpus Christi, Texas; United States
- Channels: Digital: 8 (VHF); Virtual: 3
- Branding: KIII 3 (general; pronounced "K-Triple I"); 3NEWS (newscasts)

Programming
- Affiliations: 3.1: ABC; for others, see § Subchannels

Ownership
- Owner: Tegna Inc., a subsidiary of Nexstar Media Group; (LSB Broadcasting, Inc.)

History
- First air date: Former incarnation: June 20, 1954; Current incarnation: May 4, 1964
- Last air date: Former incarnation: August 19, 1957
- Former call signs: KVDO-TV (1954−1957)
- Former channel numbers: Analog: 3 (VHF, 1964–2009)
- Former affiliations: DuMont (1954−1956); Independent (1956−1957); Dark (1957−1964); NBC/CBS (secondary, 1954−1956)
- Call sign meaning: III = Roman numeral 3

Technical information
- Licensing authority: FCC
- Facility ID: 10188
- ERP: 160 kW
- HAAT: 269 m (883 ft)
- Transmitter coordinates: 27°39′31″N 97°36′5″W

Links
- Public license information: Public file; LMS
- Website: www.kiiitv.com

KIII (channel 3) is a television station in Corpus Christi, Texas, United States, affiliated with ABC and owned by the Tegna subsidiary of Nexstar Media Group. The station's studios are located on South Padre Island Drive (SH 358) in Corpus Christi, and its transmitter is located near Robstown, Texas.

== History ==
=== KVDO-TV ===
The station was originally launched on June 20, 1954, as KVDO-TV, broadcasting on channel 22 as the Corpus Christi market's first television station. Owned by Coastal Bend Television, KVDO was a primary affiliate of the DuMont network, but carried secondary affiliations with NBC until KRIS-TV took to the air in May 1956, CBS until KZTV signed on in September 1956, and ABC. It was one of several television stations across the United States that took part in a 1956 lawsuit to prevent VHF stations from being added in their markets, on the grounds that UHF stations in that era typically suffered financially or even went out of business entirely if they had any VHF competition. The lawsuit was unsuccessful, however, and KRIS and KZTV were both on air as VHF stations by fall 1956. Around the same time as the VHF stations were launched, as well, the DuMont network collapsed.

KVDO carried on as an independent station and was sold to H. J. Schmidt's South Texas Telecasting Company in April 1957. It temporarily suspended broadcast operations in August pending what was announced at the time as a reorganization of its studio layout, but a federal tax lien was filed against the station by the Bureau of Internal Revenue in September. In October the station received FCC approval to stay off the air until January 1958, but by November 1957, the former KVDO studio building (minus equipment) had been sold to KRIS-TV, and the station did not relaunch. Coastal Bend Television, which had built the station, continued to face legal actions over debts incurred in constructing channel 22; in 1959, RCA won a $67,000 judgment against the former owners for equipment payments on which it had defaulted.

=== Fighting for channel 3 ===
Following the demise of the original KVDO-TV, South Texas Telecasting petitioned the Federal Communications Commission (FCC) to add a third VHF allocation on channel 3 at Corpus Christi due to KVDO's failure as a UHF station. Other cities also wanted the channel 3 allocation; however, following a lot of struggle, channel 3 was ultimately allocated to Corpus Christi, and hearings to award the channel began in 1961. South Texas Telecasting was one of three applicants for the channel, alongside Nueces Telecasting and the Corpus Christi Caller-Times, but the Caller-Times withdrew its application in 1962 after its owner, Harte-Hanks Newspapers, acquired the San Antonio Express-News.

South Texas Telecasting was awarded channel 3 in December 1962, but Nueces Telecasting then filed a protest alleging that awarding the channel to South Texas Telecasting would violate the FCC's regulations on concentration of media ownership. Nueces withdrew its petition in June 1963 after South Texas Telecasting agreed to pay the company $40,000.

=== KIII ===
The station relaunched on May 4, 1964, as KIII, a full ABC affiliate.

South Texas Telecasting, which had by this time added Clinton D. McKinnon as its major stockholder and executive vice president but still retained most of its original board of directors, later evolved into McKinnon Broadcasting, who remained the station's owners until 2010.

In 1969, KIII started a satellite in Victoria, Texas, KXIX (channel 19), to bring ABC programming to that area. In 1976, KXIX was sold to local ownership. It now operates as Fox affiliate KVCT.

On April 29, 2010, it was announced that KIII would be acquired by London Broadcasting Company. The sale was closed on August 31. On September 18, 2011, KIII began broadcasting newscasts in high definition.

On May 14, 2014, the Gannett Company announced that it would acquire KIII and five other LBC stations for $215 million. Gannett's CEO Gracia Martore touted that the acquisition would give the company a presence in several fast-growing markets, and opportunities for local advertisers to leverage its digital marketing platform. The company also owns fellow Texas ABC affiliates WFAA and KVUE, which it had acquired in its purchase of Belo Corporation. The sale was completed on July 8. 13 months later, on June 29, 2015, the Gannett Company split in two, with one side specializing in print media and the other side specializing in broadcast and digital media. KIII was retained by the latter company, named Tegna.

Nexstar Media Group acquired Tegna in a deal announced in August 2025 and completed on March 19, 2026.

== Programming ==
KIII carries the entire ABC schedule, with a half-hour delay on Friday late-night programming during the UIL/TAPPS high school football season for an extended newscast with Friday night highlights.

In 2004, KIII, along with sister station KBMT, was one of the 65 ABC affiliated stations who preempted an uninterrupted Veterans Day broadcast of the 1998 movie Saving Private Ryan.

=== News operation ===
KIII currently airs 21 1/2 hours of local news programming each week (with 3 1/2 hours each weekday and two hours each on Saturdays and Sundays). The station also produces its own high school football highlight show when in season; the program airs on Fridays immediately after the 10 p.m. newscast. The station has been rated #1 consistently, beating its nearest competitor, KRIS, by a significant margin.

== Technical information ==
=== Subchannels ===
The station's signal is multiplexed:

Subchannels of KIII
Subchannel	Res.	Short name	Programming
3.1	720p	KIII-HD	ABC
3.2	480i	MeTV	MeTV
3.3	480i	Quest	Quest (4:3)
3.4	480i	Cozi	Cozi TV
3.5	480i	Crime	True Crime Network
3.6	480i	NEST	The Nest
3.7	480i	ShopLC	Shop LC
3.8	480i	GetTV	Great (4:3)
3.9	480i	QVC	QVC (4:3) → Outlaw (soon)

=== Analog-to-digital conversion ===
KIII shut down its analog signal, over VHF channel 3, on June 12, 2009, the official date on which full-power television stations in the United States transitioned from analog to digital broadcasts under federal mandate. The station's digital signal remained on its pre-transition VHF channel 8, using virtual channel 3.
