= WIKB-FM =

Coordinates: 46.101°N 88.540°W

- Iron River, Michigan; United States
- Frequency: 99.1 MHz

Programming
- Format: Classic hits

Ownership
- Owner: Morgan Murphy Media; (Queen Bee's Knees LLC)
- Sister stations: WFER

History
- First air date: 1981
- Call sign meaning: Iron Mountain, Kingsford Brietung Township

Technical information
- Licensing authority: FCC
- Facility ID: 49683
- Class: C1
- ERP: 60,000 watts
- HAAT: 150 meters (490 ft)

Links
- Public license information: Public file; LMS
- Webcast: Listen live
- Website: www.wikb.com

WIKB-FM (99.1 MHz) is a radio station broadcasting a classic hits format. Licensed to Iron River, Michigan, it first began broadcasting in 1981. The station is owned by Morgan Murphy Media.

== History ==
Logo as a country station

WIKB-FM dropped its former adult contemporary format as "The Breeze" for a country format and the handle "99-1 The Bull" at the end of Memorial Day Weekend 2010. The change comes after former Armada Media CEO Jim Coursolle and his wife, Diane, closed on a purchase of a two-thirds interest in owner Heartland Communications from Granite Equity Partners in May 2010. Also involved in the deal are sister station WFER AM 1230 (which switched from adult standards to talk radio) and stations in Ashland, Park Falls, and Eagle River, Wisconsin. Coursolle has said he felt a country format would give WIKB-FM a stronger association with a long-running rodeo in Iron River. ()

However, with the format change came a shift from mainly locally originating programming (with the exception of Delilah nights) to Dial Global's True Country satellite feed, with the only locally originating programming being the station's "Shopping Show" hosted by Marian Volek. It has been reported that the station's listenership has declined significantly since the change; in addition, parts of the station's listening area can already receive country stations from Iron Mountain and other nearby cities, whereas the former "Breeze" was the only mainstream AC format serving the area.

Previous to the AC format, WIKB and WIKB-FM simulcast a long-running "Solid Gold Classics" format featuring music from the 1960s through the 1980s. The former WIKB (now WFER) has returned to a classic hits format since the two stations were sold in the summer of 2015.

WIKB-FM was sold effective June 30, 2015, to Stephen Marks' Iron River Community Broadcasting Corporation, at a purchase price of $488,000. The sale included WFER, as well as co-owned WCQM and WPFP. With the ownership change the station's country music format was retained but overhauled, with the "Bull" moniker and most satellite programming (except for the syndicated Big D and Bubba morning show) dropped and the music now programmed locally. Also, the station's signature "Telephone Time" program was brought back and now runs for three hours daily from 9 a.m. to noon.

On December 9, 2019, WIKB-FM changed their format from country to classic hits, swapping formats with WFER.

In September 2023, The Marks Group sold its Michigan broadcasting properties—WBKB-TV, WBKP, WBUP, and the Houghton and Iron River radio stations—for $13.375 million to Morgan Murphy Media. The deal was closed on December 4.
