= WFER =

Coordinates: 46°03′55″N 88°38′17″W

- Iron River, Michigan; United States
- Frequency: 1230 kHz
- Branding: 97.9 WFER

Programming
- Format: Classic country
- Affiliations: Compass Media Networks

Ownership
- Owner: Morgan Murphy Media; (Queen Bee's Knees LLC)
- Sister stations: WIKB-FM

History
- First air date: November 15, 1949 (as WIKB)
- Former call signs: WIKB (1949–2010)

Technical information
- Licensing authority: FCC
- Facility ID: 49684
- Class: C
- Power: 1,000 watts unlimited
- Translator: 97.9 W250CQ (Iron River)

Links
- Public license information: Public file; LMS
- Webcast: Listen live
- Website: www.wferam.com

WFER (1230 AM) is a radio station broadcasting a classic country format. Licensed to Iron River, Michigan, it first began broadcasting in 1949. The station is owned by Morgan Murphy Media

== History ==
WIKB had previously been a simulcast of WIKB-FM 99.1's oldies format until the stations were sold to Heartland Communications. Heartland continued the oldies format on AM 1230 while changing FM 99.1 to adult contemporary as "The Breeze". WIKB soon dropped oldies in favor of adult standards.

In May 2010, former Armada Media CEO Jim Coursolle and his wife Diane closed on a purchase of a two-thirds interest in owner Heartland Communications from Granite Equity Partners. In early June, the Coursolles changed the format of WIKB-FM to country music, and announced plans to drop the America's Best Music adult standards format on AM 1230 (which had changed its calls to WFER in May) in favor of a conservative talk format featuring personalities such as Glenn Beck, Rush Limbaugh, Sean Hannity, Laura Ingraham, and Michael Savage. The new format was dubbed "Freedom Talk". A similar format was installed on sister stations WATW in Ashland, Wisconsin, WNBI in Park Falls, Wisconsin, and WERL in Eagle River, Wisconsin; WATW and WERL formerly aired Dial Global's adult standards feed (as did WIKB/WFER) while WNBI was an ESPN Radio affiliate.

Former logo

WFER was sold effective June 30, 2015, to Stephen Marks' Iron River Community Broadcasting Corporation, at a purchase price of $488,000. The sale included WIKB-FM, as well as co-owned WCQM and WPFP. Following the sale, in early July 2015, WFER changed its format to classic hits. Some programming was derived from Westwood One's Classic Hits-Rock 24/7 format.

In September 2023, The Marks Group sold its Michigan broadcasting properties—WBKB-TV, WBKP, WBUP, and the Houghton and Iron River radio stations—for $13.375 million to Morgan Murphy Media. The deal was closed on December 4.
