= Regional variation =

Television programming that varies by region

A regional variation generally refers to times when a radio station or television station simultaneously broadcasts different programs, continuity or advertisements to different parts of its coverage area. This may be so as to provide programming specific to a particular region, such as local news, or to allow advertisements to be targeted to a particular area.

Some regional variations are the consequence of a federal style television network or radio network, in which a local station is a part of a larger broadcast network and broadcasts the network's programs some of the time and its own programming the rest of the time. The latter is therefore sometimes considered a regional variation. Examples of this include the UK's ITV network throughout much of its history, and US network affiliate stations.

Regional variation is also a common term used in British television listings publications, such as magazines and newspapers, to show the different programs broadcast in different areas of the country.

== By country ==
=== Canada ===
Commercial television in Canada generally used a model similar to the that of the US, with networks composed of first-party owned and operated (O&O) stations and third-party affiliates. However, from the 1990s through the 2000s, Canada's major commercial networks were largely consolidated under their parent companies, with little to no private affiliates: CTV, Global, Citytv, and TVA's respective stations are owned by the conglomerates Bell Media, Corus Entertainment, Rogers Media, and Quebecor, respectively.

The major English-language networks—including advertising-funded public network CBC Television—have largely used similar schedules and consistent branding and on-air continuity, with little variation besides time zone variations to allow for simultaneous substitution of programming carried by US broadcast stations available on cable and satellite television, and local newscasts and public affairs programs; for example, some CTV stations, especially in Western Canada, air a local morning show under the Your Morning (formerly branded as CTV Morning Live) brand in place of the network version (which initially replaced Canada AM in 2016), which is produced from Toronto and has a national focus

There are relatively few third-party affiliate stations of Canada's commercial networks; they typically follow the schedule of an O&O in a nearby major market but with opt-outs for local newscasts and other local programming, and may also simulcast that station's newscasts in time slots where they do not air their own, essentially acting as a third-party semi-satellite.

Corus Entertainment's private CTV affiliates substituted CTV News programs with Global News programs, and CHEX-TV-2 additionally branded as "Global Durham" despite otherwise being a CTV affiliate. CHEX-DT/Peterborough is within the range of CTV's Toronto station CFTO-DT, and both are carried on cable locally; the stations ultimately became Global stations after the affiliation expired. These stations were previously private CBC affiliates. When Hockey Night in Canada aired games regionally, CHEX aired an alternate game over CBC's Toronto station CBLT to provide an additional option for viewers where both stations were readily available.

CJON-DT has more significant variations due to having sublicensed different types of programming from Global, CTV, and Yes TV.

=== Philippines ===
Regional variation in the Philippines is more an exception than a rule, as most of a network's stations across the country simulcast the entire programming lineup seen on that network's flagship station (usually based in Metro Manila). This practice effective renders most regional stations as relay stations of their parent network's flagship station.

However, some national networks, like GMA, have regional variations in selected parts of the country. They feature regional news programmes (each network decides how many different regional variations it wishes to have and which provinces constitute which viewing region). Sometimes, whilst network programming is ongoing, stations may insert a ticker tape of advertisements from local/regional companies.

Prior to ABS-CBN's free-to-air stations' shutdown due to the non-renewal of that network's broadcasting franchise, its regional stations used to feature regional programmes beyond news. However, most had been scaled back dramatically or cancelled altogether due to cost-cutting measures and preparations for the network's impending digital switchover. When ABS-CBN offered regional free-to-air TV, it featured regional variations of TV Patrol, which were standalone news programmes that aired late in the afternoon immediately before the main national edition.

From 2011 to 2016, TV5 featured regional variations in its Cebu station DYET-TV with a local news programme entitled Aksyon Bisaya. Since then, DYET-TV has reverted to a relay station of DWET-TV.

=== United Kingdom ===
In British television, regional variations commonly involve the provisioning of local news and current affairs programming; for example, the licenses for the ITV network require that its stations carry a minimum quota of regional news. As the United Kingdom consists of four different countries, television stations serving Northern Ireland, Scotland, and Wales have a tradition of providing additional programming of interest to their respective nation, which may preempt programmes seen in other regions.

The BBC's local outlets are divided into departments for each country, including BBC English Regions (which itself is subdivided into divisions encompassing the various regions of England), BBC Northern Ireland, BBC Scotland, and BBC Cymru Wales. The English Regions division was first established in the 1970s in response to ITV and the growth of BBC Local Radio, replacing broader transmission regions that previously operated in England (North, Midlands and East Anglia, and South and West. BBC London primarily served as the production centre for national programmes and network feeds, and was not considered a transmission region), with a system of regional production centres for national programming in Birmingham, Bristol, and Manchester so that national programming would not be produced exclusively from London, and smaller regions with the capability of producing local programming such as news.

BBC One currently operates 15 regional services, 12 of which (plus three sub-regions) are for England, and one each for Northern Ireland, Scotland, and Wales. They are differentiated primarily by local news and current affairs programming. The Northern Ireland, Scotland, and Wales channels have more noticeable on-air differences, including more prominent regional branding (with use of local continuity announcers), and additional opt-out programmes specific to the region. For example, BBC One Scotland has aired original series such as the Glasgow-set soap opera River City, airs local sports coverage under the Sportscene banner, and preempts BBC One's London-centric New Year's Eve special in favour of a lineup of Hogmanay-themed programming, culminating with coverage of Edinburgh's midnight fireworks.

BBC Two currently has two regional services, BBC Two Northern Ireland and BBC Two Wales. From 2001 to 2009, BBC Two Wales carried a part-time opt-out in prime time on digital television known as BBC 2W, which carried a separate lineup of Wales-produced programming. The service was discontinued in 2009, after which BBC Two Wales began to be broadcast in both analogue and digital, with a mix of national programmes and opt-outs for regional programmes. BBC Two Scotland was discontinued in 2019 in favour of a part-time BBC Scotland channel, with the national BBC Two feed from England replacing BBC Two Scotland on television platforms.

ITV was originally conceived as a collective of broadcasters serving different regions of the United Kingdom with regional and national programming. The franchises were originally awarded by the Independent Television Authority (ITA) (later the Independent Broadcasting Authority (IBA)) through a review process. The implementation of the Broadcasting Act 1990 and replacement of the IBA with the ITC resulted in major changes to the structure of ITV: the previous review process was replaced by an auction, and most of the previously separate companies began to consolidate over the decade in order to be more competitive against larger conglomerates. This resulted in two main owners across England and Wales: Carlton and Granada. These two companies then merged to form ITV plc in 2004.

As of 2013, ITV operated 14 news regions, expanding from a previous realignment that had cut ITV to eight news regions, and also led to cuts of non-peak bulletins and the ending of other regional programmes. Following ITV's acquisition of Channel Television in 2011, two franchises—UTV in Northern Ireland and STV in Scotland—remained the only ITV franchises not owned by ITV plc. In 2009, STV became caught in a legal dispute with ITV over its decisions to opt-out of networked programmes that it deemed "underperforming", in favour of more Scottish productions. STV and UTV's presence in the network were transitioned to an affiliate model in 2012, in which they would now pay an upfront license fee to ITV plc for the rights to carry ITV programming. UTV would later be sold to ITV plc in 2015.

In Wales, S4C launched in 1982 as a fourth television channel dedicated to Welsh-language programmes; prior to then, Welsh programmes had commonly been scheduled as regional opt-outs on BBC One Wales and ITV station HTV—a practice that proved controversial due to their inconvenient scheduling, as well as the resulting pre-emptions of English-language programmes screened elsewhere. Upon S4C's launch, BBC Cymru Wales and HTV agreed to move their Welsh-language output to the new channel. Channel 4—a fourth national channel that concurrently launched outside Wales—sub-licensed its programmes to S4C at no charge, as they would not otherwise have been available in Wales. Channel 4 programmes aired on S4C in off-peak time slots. The arrangement was phased out with the transition from analogue to digital terrestrial television, as Channel 4 would become available over-the-air in Wales on Freeview. S4C's digital services would broadcast solely in Welsh.

=== United States ===
US broadcast television is heavily regionalised due to the business model of its major networks, which enter into agreements with stations in each media market to carry their national programming, similarly to a franchise. As the FCC enforces a limit on the market share of broadcasters, commercial networks have only owned and operated stations (O&Os) in major or otherwise strategic markets, and rely on third-party affiliates to reach the remainder of the country. PBS—the United States' public television network—refers to affiliates as member stations instead, and does not limit them to one per market. PBS does not have O&O stations due to its structure, but some of its largest members have served as de facto flagships due to their prominent contributions to the PBS national schedule, including WGBH-TV in Boston, WNET in New York City, and WETA-TV in Washington, DC.

Outside of network programming (which usually consists of two or three hours of prime time programmes per night at a minimum, and may also include national news, sports, and daytime programmes), the scheduling of each station's programming varies. It usually consists of local newscasts, programmes acquired from the syndication market, and brokered programming (including infomercials, more often in off-peak hours). Similarities may still exist in the scheduling of syndicated programmes between markets, based on factors such as "recommended" timeslots suggested by a programme's distributor, and a single broadcaster acquiring a particular programme for all their stations in a group deal. Due to differing market dynamics, Spanish-language networks such as Telemundo and Univision, as well as specialty networks designed to be carried on digital subchannels, have a centralised network schedule, from which stations may opt out for local news or regulatory obligations not fulfilled by national programming, such as children's educational programming.

Affiliates may, from time to time, opt out of network programs to air special programming of local interest, such as coverage of sports or local celebrations. Affiliation contracts typically contain restrictions on how often this can be done, and may require the displaced programming to be pre-empted to either a sister station, digital subchannel, or different time slot, such as during the late-night hours or on a different night as compensation. In the past, Westinghouse Broadcasting was known for pre-empting network programming on its stations for its own in-house programming. When reaching a major affiliation deal with CBS in 1994 as part of a larger re-alignment of broadcast television triggered by Fox's acquisition of New World Communications, the company agreed to cease this practice and carry all CBS network programming in-pattern with no preemptions. Westinghouse later acquired CBS outright.

In certain highly publicised cases, affiliates have opted out of network programmes—either individual episodes or entire series—based on objections to their content by station management and/or ownership for ethics, sensitivity, political, or other reasons.

A more straightforward equivalent to a regional variation in North American broadcasting is a semi-satellite—a co-owned rebroadcaster of a television station used to extend its range into a different portion of a market (if the main signal is not strong enough to reach it), or a different one entirely with more variation in programming than a straight rebroadcaster. Semi-satellites typically share the majority of their programming with a parent station (which may vary to account for syndication rights), but carry a different on-air brand, and local advertising specific to the region. Some semi-satellites have dedicated news bureaus, and may opt out from the parent's station's newscasts to carry either local news segments or dedicated local newscasts in selected time slots.

- WJMN-TV in Escanaba, Michigan—which formerly served as a sister to Green Bay, Wisconsin's WFRV-TV for Michigan's Upper Peninsula—largely served as a passthrough for WFRV's programming and CBS affiliation. In 2014, then-owner Nexstar Media Group opened a new studio for WJMN in Marquette, which would be used to produce Upper Michigan-specific evening newscasts. In 2022, WJMN lost its CBS affiliation to WZMQ, resulting in changes to its schedule to supplant network programming (including an affiliation with MyNetworkTV). In 2024, the station was separated from WFRV with its sale to Sullivan's Landing, LLC, which entered into shared services agreements with Morgan Murphy Media to consolidate their newly-acquired ABC and CW stations WBUP and WBKP with WJMN. The station would become a rebroadcaster of WBUP and WBKP, therefore regaining ABC as a primary affiliation (the existing MyNetworkTV schedule was moved to a digital subchannel).
- WDAZ-TV in Grand Forks, North Dakota—a sister to WDAY-TV in Fargo. WDAZ previously aired Grand Forks-specific evening and late-night newscasts, while otherwise simulcasting regional newscasts produced from Fargo by WDAY. Between 2014 and 2018, WDAZ phased out its local newscasts due to moves by owner Forum Communications towards state-wide programs produced from WDAY (which also includes sister stations KBMY/KMCY in western and central North Dakota); it continues to maintain a bureau for Grand Forks-specific coverage.
- WSAZ-TV in Huntington, West Virginia—which previously operated a retransmitter, W16CE, to improve its broadcast coverage in the state capital of Charleston, West Virginia. During this time, the stations' newscasts were divided into regional and local segments. The regional segment was simulcast across both stations and jointly presented by anchors in Huntington and Charleston via split screen. The stations then broke away for segments focusing on their respective cities.
- In some regions, a larger-scale group of co-owned stations may be linked together to form a state network, such as the Montana Television Network (a group of CBS affiliates and one NBC affiliate across Montana); NBC North Dakota; Forum Communications' ABC affiliates KBMY in Bismarck and KMCY in Minot, which are largely fed from WDAY; as well as chains of non-commercial stations, typically PBS stations.
- In some markets, there may be multiple PBS member stations, operating either as a duopoly partner of another station (such as WGBH's WGBX), or being operated by another entity. In these cases, the members cooperate with PBS on alternate schedules so that the secondary stations carry different amounts of national programming.

Regional sports networks that cover large regions may similarly be carved into regional variants to account for differing broadcast rights to teams between markets. Examples include Fox Sports San Diego—spun from Fox Sports West in 2012 after it acquired rights to the San Diego Padres of Major League Baseball— and MSG Western New York, a Buffalo, New York-centric feed of the state-wide MSG Network co-owned by local team owner Pegula Sports and Entertainment.

== See also ==
- TV listings (UK)
- Listings magazine
- Local insertion
