= WNBI =

WNBI may refer to:

- WNBI-LP, a low-power radio station (107.9 FM) licensed to serve New Buffalo, Michigan, United States
- WPFP, a radio station (980 AM) licensed to serve Park Falls, Wisconsin, United States, which held the call sign WNBI from 1968 to 2010
- WCQM, a radio station (98.3 FM) licensed to serve Park Falls, Wisconsin, which held the call sign WNBI-FM until 1991
