= WGLR =

WGLR may refer to:

- WGLR-FM, a radio station (97.7 FM) licensed to Lancaster, Wisconsin, United States
- WGLR (AM), a former radio station (1280 AM) licensed to Lancaster, Wisconsin, United States
