= WPVL =

WPVL may refer to:

- WPVL (AM), a radio station (1590 AM) licensed to Platteville, Wisconsin, United States
- WPVL-FM, a radio station (107.1 FM) licensed to Platteville, Wisconsin, United States
- WABQ, a radio station (1460 AM) licensed to Painesville, Ohio, which held the call sign WPVL from 1956 to 1984
