= UGN =

UGN may refer to:

- UGN, IATA identifier for Waukegan Regional Airport, in Waukegan Lake County, Illinois, USA
- UGN meaning Upper Great News broadcast on WBKP and WBUP
- UGN, a 2000 model of Unimog multi-purpose auto four wheel drive trucks produced by Mercedes-Benz
- ugn, ISO 639 identifier for Ugandan Sign Language
- United Galactic Navy (UGN) the third most powerful Blockland space clan of all time that operated between 2009 - 2011 - related to Geographic coordinate system
- United Gay Network (UGN), film production house established Michael Akers and Sandon Berg
