= WIKB =

WIKB may refer to:

- WIKB-FM, a radio station (99.1 FM) licensed to Iron River, Michigan, United States
- WFER, a radio station (1230 AM) licensed to Iron River, Michigan, United States, which held the call sign WIKB until May 2010
