= KIKC =

KIKC may refer to:

- KIKC (AM), a radio station (1250 AM) licensed to Forsyth, Montana, United States
- KIKC-FM, a radio station (101.3 FM) licensed to Forsyth, Montana, United States
