= WCCY =

Coordinates: 47°08′06″N 88°33′53″W

- Houghton, Michigan; United States
- Frequency: 1400 kHz
- Branding: The Lift 99.3 FM

Programming
- Format: Top 40 (CHR)
- Affiliations: Michigan Radio Network; Detroit Pistons; Detroit Lions; Detroit Red Wings; Detroit Tigers; Finlandia Lions

Ownership
- Owner: Morgan Murphy Media; (Queen Bee's Knees LLC)
- Sister stations: WHBS, WHKB, WOLV

History
- First air date: 1929 (as WHDF)
- Former call signs: WHDF (1929–1979)

Technical information
- Licensing authority: FCC
- Facility ID: 65672
- Class: C
- Power: 1,000 watts unlimited
- Translator: 99.3 W257CZ (Houghton)

Links
- Public license information: Public file; LMS
- Webcast: Listen live
- Website: www.993thelift.com

WCCY (1400 AM) is a radio station broadcasting a contemporary hit radio format. Licensed to Houghton, Michigan, it first began broadcasting in 1929. It is owned by Morgan Murphy Media.

The studios are at 313 E. Montezuma, Houghton. It shares this location with its sister stations, WHBS, WHKB, and WOLV.

== History ==
WCCY is the oldest continually operated radio station in the Upper Peninsula, tracing its history back to WHDF in nearby Calumet.

On June 16, 2017, at 3 pm, WCCY changed their format from adult standards to CHR, branded as "99.3 The Lift".

In September 2023, The Marks Group sold its Michigan broadcasting properties—WBKB-TV, WBKP, WBUP, and the Houghton and Iron River radio stations—for $13.375 million to Morgan Murphy Media. The deal was closed on December 4.
