= WOLV (FM) =

Coordinates: 47.135°N 88.565°W

- Houghton, Michigan; United States
- Broadcast area: Houghton-Hancock, Michigan
- Frequency: 97.7 MHz
- Branding: 97.7 The Wolf

Programming
- Format: Classic hits
- Affiliations: ABC News Radio

Ownership
- Owner: Morgan Murphy Media; (Queen Bee's Knees LLC)
- Sister stations: WCCY, WHKB, WHBS

History
- First air date: January 1980 (as WHUH)
- Former call signs: WHUH (1980–1990); WOLF-FM (1990–1994)
- Call sign meaning: Wolves, plural for 'wolf'

Technical information
- Licensing authority: FCC
- Facility ID: 65673
- Class: C3
- ERP: 6,500 watts
- HAAT: 180 meters (590 ft)

Links
- Public license information: Public file; LMS
- Webcast: Listen live
- Website: www.thewolf.com

WOLV (97.7 MHz "The Wolf") is an FM radio station licensed to Houghton, Michigan, broadcasting a classic hits format. The studios are at 313 E. Montezuma in Houghton, a location it shares with its sister stations, WCCY, WHKB, and WHBS.

== History ==
The station first went on the air in January 1980 as WHUH. In 1990, the station's call letters were changed to WOLF-FM. In 1994, the call letters were changed to WOLV.

In 2019, WOLV was named the Michigan Association of Broadcasters' Station of the Year.

In September 2023, The Marks Group sold its Michigan broadcasting properties—WBKB-TV, WBKP, WBUP, and the Houghton and Iron River radio stations—for $13.375 million to Morgan Murphy Media. The deal was closed on December 4.
