= WHKB =

Coordinates: 47.135°N 88.565°W

- Houghton, Michigan; United States
- Frequency: 102.3 MHz
- Branding: K-Bear 102

Programming
- Format: Country
- Affiliations: ABC News Radio

Ownership
- Owner: Morgan Murphy Media; (Queen Bee's Knees LLC)
- Sister stations: WCCY, WOLV, WHBS

History
- Former call signs: WAAH (1987–1998)
- Call sign meaning: Houghton, Keweenaw, and Baraga Counties

Technical information
- Licensing authority: FCC
- Facility ID: 27690
- Class: C3
- Power: 6,000 watts
- ERP: 167 meters (548 ft)

Links
- Public license information: Public file; LMS
- Webcast: Listen live
- Website: www.kbear102.com

WHKB (102.3 FM, "K-Bear 102") is a radio station broadcasting a country music format. The studios are at 313 E. Montezuma, Houghton. It shares this location with its sister stations, WOLV, WCCY, and WHBS.

Licensed to Houghton, Michigan, it first began broadcasting under the WAAH call sign.

In September 2023, The Marks Group sold its Michigan broadcasting properties—WBKB-TV, WBKP, WBUP, and the Houghton and Iron River radio stations—for $13.375 million to Morgan Murphy Media. The deal was closed on December 4.
