= Frank Stone =

Frank Stone may refer to:

- Frank Stone (painter) (1800–1859), English painter
- Frank Mends Stone (1857–1942), Australian lawyer and politician
- Frank Stone (Wisconsin politician) (1876–1937)
- Frank Stone (Dream Team), a fictional character from the soap opera Dream Team
- Frank Stone, a fictional villain from the Dead by Daylight videogame The Casting of Frank Stone
