= ABC 3 =

ABC 3 may refer to:

- ABC Me, formerly ABC3, in Australia
- ABC Canberra (TV station), formerly ABC-3, in Australia
- ABC 3 (American Broadcasting Company affiliates)
