= WJMN =

WJMN may refer to:

- WJMN (FM), a radio station (94.5 FM) licensed to Boston, Massachusetts, United States
- WJMN-TV, a television station (channel 32, virtual 3) licensed to Escanaba, Michigan, United States
