= ABC 3 (American Broadcasting Company affiliates) =

ABC 3 may refer to:

== Affiliates ==
- KATC (TV) in Lafayette, Louisiana
- KESQ-TV in Palm Springs, California (cable channel, broadcasts on channel 42)
- KEYT-TV in Santa Barbara, California
- KIII-TV, Corpus Christi, Texas
- KOTA-TV in Rapid City, South Dakota
- KTBS-TV in Shreveport, Louisiana
- KTVO, Kirksville, Missouri–Ottumwa, Iowa
- WEAR-TV in Pensacola, Florida–Mobile, Alabama
- WHSV-TV in Harrisonburg, Virginia
- WJMN-TV in Escanaba, Michigan
  - Satellite of WBUP in Ishpeming, Michigan
- WSIL-TV in Harrisburg, Illinois–Paducah, Kentucky–Cape Girardeau, Missouri)
- WWAY in Wilmington, North Carolina

== Former affiliates ==
- KOTA-TV, now KHME, Rapid City, South Dakota (1955–2016)
- KTVK, Phoenix, Arizona (1955–1995)
- KYUS-TV, Miles City, Montana (1987–1996)
- WLAJ, Lansing, Michigan (branded as ABC 3 from 2007–2013)
- TV3 Winchester, Winchester, Virginia, formerly on WHSV-TV 3.3 (2007–013)
