= WGLR (AM) =

Lancaster, Wisconsin; United States
- Frequency: 1280 kHz

Ownership
- Owner: Morgan Murphy Media; (Queenb Radio Wisconsin, Inc.)
- Sister stations: WGLR-FM

History
- Call sign meaning: Grant County-Lancaster Radio

Technical information
- Facility ID: 33053
- Class: D
- Power: 500 watts (day); 22 watts (night)
- Transmitter coordinates: 42°50′18.00″N 90°40′14.00″W

WGLR (1280 AM) was a radio station that went off the air as of April 1, 2015. WGLR previously broadcast a sports format. Prior to sports, the station had an oldies format, simulcasting sister station WPVL 1590 kHz in Platteville, Wisconsin. Before oldies, WGLR(AM) had a country music format simulcasting co-owned WGLR-FM. Licensed to Lancaster, Wisconsin, United States. WGLR (AM) began as a daytime only station and later added nighttime service with lower power. The station's ownership requested its license be cancelled by the FCC on April 1, 2016.
