= WBKB =

WBKB refers to three broadcasting stations.

== Current ==
- WBKB-TV, a television station (channel 11) licensed to Alpena, Michigan, United States

== Past ==
- WBBM-TV, a television station (channel 2 analog/12 digital) licensed to Chicago, Illinois, United States, which held the call signs WBKB or WBKB-TV from 1946 to 1953
- WLS-TV, a television station (channel 7 analog/22 digital) licensed to Chicago, Illinois, United States, which held the call signs WBKB or WBKB-TV from 1953 to 1968
