= Park Falls Municipal Airport =

Airport in Park Falls, Wisconsin, USA

- IATA: PKF; ICAO: KPKF; FAA LID: PKF

Summary
- Airport type: Public
- Owner: City of Park Falls
- Serves: Park Falls, Wisconsin
- Opened: June 1966
- Time zone: CST (UTC−06:00)
  - Summer (DST): CDT (UTC−05:00)
- Elevation AMSL: 1,501 ft (458 m)
- Coordinates: 45°57′18″N 090°25′28″W

Map
- Location of airport in Wisconsin PKF (the United States)

Runways
Direction	Length		Surface
Direction	ft	m	Surface
18/36	3,200	975	Asphalt

Statistics
- Aircraft operations (2023): 6,750
- Based aircraft (2024): 3
- Source: Federal Aviation Administration

Park Falls Municipal Airport (IATA: PKF, ICAO: KPKF, FAA LID: PKF) is a city owned public use airport located two nautical miles (4 km) northeast of the central business district of Park Falls, a city in Price County, Wisconsin, United States. It is included in the Federal Aviation Administration (FAA) National Plan of Integrated Airport Systems for 2025–2029, in which it is categorized as an unclassified general aviation facility.

== Facilities and aircraft ==
Park Falls Municipal Airport covers an area of 72 acres (29 ha) at an elevation of 1,501 feet (458 m) above mean sea level. It has one runway designated 18/36 with an asphalt surface measuring 3,200 by 60 feet (975 x 18 m), with approved GPS approaches. The Park Falls NDB navaid, (PKF) frequency 371 kHz, is located on the field.

For the 12-month period ending June 22, 2023, the airport had 6,750 aircraft operations, an average of 18 per day: 97% general aviation and 3% air taxi. As of July 2024, there were three aircraft based at this airport; all three are single-engine.

== See also ==
- List of airports in Wisconsin
