= WHBS =

Coordinates: 47.135°N 88.565°W

- Houghton, Michigan; United States
- Broadcast area: Houghton micropolitan area
- Frequency: 96.3 MHz
- Branding: Lite 96.3 - Houghton's Breeze

Programming
- Format: Adult contemporary

Ownership
- Owner: Morgan Murphy Media; (Queen Bee's Knees LLC)
- Sister stations: WOLV-FM, WCCY, WHKB

History
- First air date: 2024

Technical information
- Licensing authority: FCC
- Facility ID: 762384
- Class: C1
- ERP: 37,000 watts
- HAAT: 226 meters (741 ft)

Links
- Public license information: Public file; LMS
- Webcast: Listen Live
- Website: breeze963.com

WHBS (96.3 FM) is an adult contemporary radio station licensed to Houghton, Michigan, with a power output of 37,000 watts, covering the Keweenaw Peninsula. The station is owned by Morgan Murphy Media and broadcasts from studios at 313 E. Montezuma in Houghton.

In 2021, then owner Stephen Marks was the highest bidder during a Federal Communications Commission frequency auction for a new FM license serving Houghton, Michigan. Under the call letters WHSB, the new station went on the air in late 2024 at 96.3 MHz as "Lite 96-3, Houghton’s Breeze".

The station initially featured a Christmas Music format, and is expected to broadcast a Soft Adult Contemporary format following the holiday season. According to station management, the format will feature "five decades of the greatest soft pop sounds."

Much like its sister stations WOLV-FM, WCCY, and WHKB, WHBS features Keweenaw Report news and sports broadcasts, community calendar updates, and funeral announcements.
