= KIYX =

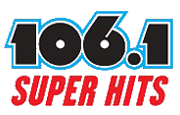
- Sageville, Iowa; United States
- Broadcast area: Dubuque, Iowa
- Frequency: 106.1 MHz
- Branding: Super Hits 106.1

Programming
- Format: Classic hits

Ownership
- Owner: Morgan Murphy Media; (QueenB Radio Wisconsin, Inc.)
- Sister stations: WGLR-FM, WPVL, WPVL-FM

History
- First air date: 1999

Technical information
- Licensing authority: FCC
- Facility ID: 77326
- Class: A
- ERP: 4,200 watts
- HAAT: 120 meters (390 ft)
- Transmitter coordinates: 42°41′27″N 90°37′26.5″W

Links
- Public license information: Public file; LMS
- Webcast: Listen live
- Website: www.superhits106.com

KIYX (106.1 FM) is a radio station broadcasting a classic hits format. Licensed to Sageville, Iowa, United States, the station serves the Dubuque, Iowa area. The station is currently owned by Morgan Murphy Media.
