= The Marks Group =

American media company

The Marks Group was a Maryland-based operator of radio and television stations in small markets in the United States. It was founded by Stephen A. Marks (1950–2022).

== History ==
Marks entered the broadcast ownership business in 1983 when he acquired 51 percent of Thunder Bay Broadcasting, which owned WBKB-TV, the only television station in Alpena, Michigan. Marks, a native of Maryland, had previously worked as a copywriter at WINX in Rockville, Maryland, before being employed by the Mutual Broadcasting System.

Marks acquired KXGN radio and television in Glendive, Montana, in 1990. KXGN-TV, like WBKB-TV in Alpena, was the only TV station in its town, a fact Marks liked as it could then command all television advertising revenue in the market. This transaction, as well as the purchase of Glendive FM station KDZN in 1995, required waivers on account of the financial condition of the small-market stations. Further Montana broadcast properties were added with the 1995 purchase of KYUS-TV in Miles City and the 1996 acquisition of KIKC-AM-FM in Forsyth.

In 2003 Marks acquired WBKP and WBUP, together serving the Marquette, Michigan, television market. Added in 2015 were four stations owned by Heartland Communications in Iron River, Michigan, and Park Falls, Wisconsin.

Stephen Marks died on May 11, 2022, at the age of 72. His widow Mary and family began selling the broadcast properties in 2023. GSB Broadcasting acquired WOWZ-FM in Accomac, Virginia, which it already was programming, in April, while the Park Falls stations went to Civic Media in a deal announced in June. In September, Morgan Murphy Media acquired the Michigan broadcasting properties—WBKB-TV, WBKP, WBUP, and the Houghton and Iron River radio stations—for $13.375 million. The Montana and North Dakota radio stations were sold to Andrew Sturlaugson's P&A Media for $850,000 in February 2024, leaving only KXGN-TV and KYUS-TV in the Marks Group; Sturlaugson had been the operations manager for the Glendive stations.

In July 2025, the Marks Group announced that they would sell their last two remaining stations to Montana State University (who own Montana PBS) for $375,000; the remainder of KXGN-TV and KYUS-TV's value would be credited as a donation. The sale was completed and consummated on October 22, 2025, leaving the Marks estate with no broadcast properties left in its portfolio, effectively dismantling the broadcast group by default.

== Former stations ==
- Stations are arranged in alphabetical order by state and city of license.
- Two boldface asterisks appearing following a station's call letters (**) indicate a station built and signed on by The Marks Group.

Stations owned by The Marks Group
City of license	State	Station	Purchased	Sold	Notes
Alpena	Michigan	WBKB-TV	1983	2023	
Calumet	Michigan	WBKP	2003	2023	(Note: Satellite of WBUP.)
Houghton	Michigan	WCCY	2011	2023	
Houghton	Michigan	WHKB	2011	2023	
Houghton	Michigan	WOLV	2011	2023	
Iron River	Michigan	WFER	2015	2023	
Iron River	Michigan	WIKB-FM	2015	2023	
Ishpeming	Michigan	WBUP	2003	2023	
Forsyth	Montana	KIKC	1996	2024	
Forsyth	Montana	KIKC-FM	1996	2024	
Glendive	Montana	KDZN	1995	2024	
Glendive	Montana	KXGN	1990	2024	
Glendive	Montana	KXGN-TV	1990	2025	
Miles City	Montana	KMTA	2006	2024	
Miles City	Montana	KYUS-FM	2006	2024	
Miles City	Montana	KYUS-TV	1995	2025	
Sidney	Montana	KGCX**	2004	2024	
Belfield	North Dakota	KXDI**	2013	2024	
Williston	North Dakota	KDSR	2002	2024	
Williston	North Dakota	KXWI**	2014	2024	
Accomac	Virginia	WOWZ-FM	1998	2023	(Note: Operated by GSB Media from 2017 until they acquired the station in 2023.)
Park Falls	Wisconsin	WCQM	2015	2023	
Park Falls	Wisconsin	WPFP	2015	2023	
