= KIKC (AM) =

- Forsyth, Montana; United States
- Frequency: 1250 kHz
- Branding: Classic Country 1250

Programming
- Format: Classic country
- Affiliations: Fox News Radio

Ownership
- Owner: P&A Media LLC
- Sister stations: KIKC-FM

History
- First air date: October 10, 1975
- Call sign meaning: similar to "kick"

Technical information
- Licensing authority: FCC
- Facility ID: 48301
- Class: D
- Power: 5,000 watts day; 132 watts night
- Transmitter coordinates: 46°15′30″N 106°41′21″W
- Translator: 94.5 K233BL (Forsyth)

Links
- Public license information: Public file; LMS
- Webcast: Listen live
- Website: web.kikcradio.com

KIKC (1250 kHz) is an AM radio station broadcasting a classic country format. Licensed to Forsyth, Montana, United States, the station is owned by P&A Media LLC.

The station went on the air in 1975 as a country music station owned by Gold Won Radio Corporation. After being sold to NEPSK Inc. in 1987 and Stephen Marks in 1996, KIKC became an oldies station in 2001, before returning to classic country in 2009. P&A Media bought the station in 2024.

== History ==
KIKC began broadcasting on October 10, 1975, airing a country music format, and was owned by Gold Won Radio Corporation. The station ran at 5,000 watts, and operated during daytime hours only. In 1986, its sister station 101.3 KXXE's call sign was changed to KIKC-FM, and it began simulcasting the programming of KIKC.

In 1987, the station was sold to NEPSK Inc., along with its FM sister station, for $252,500. NEPSK, which also owned television properties in Maine (WAGM-TV in Presque Isle and cable television systems in Aroostook County), was initially jointly owned by Thomas Shelburne III, Peter Kozloski, and Norman Johnson; in 1991, Kozloski took full control.

In 1996, the KIKC stations were sold to Stephen Marks for $300,000; he owned them through Miles City Forsyth Broadcasting. In June 2001, the station adopted an oldies format. On February 1, 2009, KIKC changed its format from oldies to classic country.

Stephen Marks died on May 11, 2022. Andrew Sturlaugson's P&A Media acquired Marks' Montana and North Dakota radio stations, including the KIKC stations, for $850,000 in 2024.
