= WPVL-FM =

Radio station in Wisconsin, United States

- Platteville, Wisconsin; United States
- Broadcast area: Dubuque, Iowa
- Frequency: 107.1 MHz
- Branding: Xtreme 107.1

Programming
- Format: Contemporary hits
- Affiliations: Premiere Networks; Westwood One

Ownership
- Owner: Morgan Murphy Media; (QueenB Radio Wisconsin, Inc.)
- Sister stations: KIYX, WGLR-FM, WPVL

History
- Former call signs: WSWW-FM, WKPL
- Call sign meaning: Platteville

Technical information
- Licensing authority: FCC
- Facility ID: 35513
- Class: A
- ERP: 4,200 watts
- HAAT: 120 meters (390 ft)
- Transmitter coordinates: 42°41′27.00″N 90°37′26.00″W

Links
- Public license information: Public file; LMS
- Webcast: Listen live
- Website: x1071.com

WPVL-FM (107.1 FM, "Xtreme 107.1") is a commercial radio station licensed to Platteville, Wisconsin, United States, and serving the Platteville and Dubuque, Iowa, areas. Broadcasting a contemporary hit format, the station is currently owned by Morgan Murphy Media.

== History ==
The station went on the air as WSWW-FM. ("South West Wisconsin"). WSWW-AM and WSWW-FM were owned by Bob and Mary Bodden from 1955 to 1983. In 1983, the stations were sold to Edward Kramer of Kramer Broadcasting and the call letters were changed to WTOQ-AM and WKPL-FM. In 1995, the stations were sold to an investment group led by Paul Braun. On 1995-09-01, the station changed its call sign to the current WPVL-FM. In 1998, as part of a merger with radio stations WGLR-AM and FM in Lancaster, Wisconsin, the group of stations were bought by Morgan Murphy Media and became known as QueenB Radio.

== Station programming ==
WPVL-FM mixes local hosts with syndicated programming throughout the broadcast day. Weekend hours contain a mix of local voice-tracking and syndicated shows. WPVL-FM is Dubuque and southwest Wisconsin's home for the syndicated program On-Air with Ryan Seacrest, which airs weekdays from noon to 4pm. Xtreme 107.1 also carries the syndicated American Top 40 on Weekends.
