= KIKC-FM =

- Forsyth, Montana; United States
- Frequency: 101.3 MHz
- Branding: KIK Country

Programming
- Format: Country music
- Affiliations: Fox News Radio, Westwood One

Ownership
- Owner: P&A Media LLC
- Sister stations: KIKC (AM)

History
- First air date: September 1980 (as KXXE)
- Former call signs: KXXE (1980–1986)
- Call sign meaning: "KIK Country"

Technical information
- Licensing authority: FCC
- Facility ID: 48300
- Class: C
- ERP: 100,000 watts
- HAAT: 308 meters (1,010 ft)
- Transmitter coordinates: 46°10′32″N 106°24′21″W

Links
- Public license information: Public file; LMS
- Webcast: Listen live
- Website: web.kikcradio.com

KIKC-FM (101.3 MHz) is a radio station broadcasting a country music format. Licensed to Forsyth, Montana, United States, the station is owned by P&A Media LLC.

The station went on the air in 1980 as KXXE, a middle of the road station owned by Gold Won Radio Corporation. It has been a country music station since 1985, and became KIKC-FM in 1986; it was simulcast with KIKC (1250 AM) from then until 2001. KIKC-FM was purchased by NEPSK Inc., in 1987; ownership then passed to Stephen Marks in 1996, and P&A Media in 2024.

== History ==
The station began broadcasting in September 1980 as KXXE, airing a middle of the road (MOR) format, and was owned by Gold Won Radio Corporation. By 1985, the station had adopted a country music format. On April 1, 1986, the station's call sign was changed to KIKC-FM, and it began simulcasting the programming of AM 1250 KIKC.

In 1987, the station was sold to NEPSK Inc., along with its AM sister station, for $252,500. NEPSK, which also owned television properties in Maine (WAGM-TV in Presque Isle and cable television systems in Aroostook County), was initially jointly owned by Thomas Shelburne III, Peter Kozloski, and Norman Johnson; in 1991, Kozloski took full control.

In 1996, the KIKC stations were sold to Stephen Marks for $300,000; he owned them through Miles City Forsyth Broadcasting. In June 2001, the AM-FM simulcast ended when AM 1250 adopted an oldies format.

Stephen Marks died on May 11, 2022. Andrew Sturlaugson's P&A Media acquired Marks' Montana and North Dakota radio stations, including the KIKC stations, for $850,000 in 2024.
