= Morgan Murphy Media =

American television and radio company

Evening Telegram Company
- Trade name: Morgan Murphy Media
- Formerly: Morgan Murphy Stations
- Type: Private
- Industry: Broadcast media
- Headquarters: Madison, Wisconsin, U.S.
- Area served: United States
- Products: Television stations

The Evening Telegram Company, d/b/a Morgan Murphy Media, is an American television and radio company based in Madison, Wisconsin. The company is named for publisher Morgan Murphy, who expanded the business after he took over from his grandfather, who had founded the Superior Evening Telegram (now owned by Forum Communications).

== History ==
The company traces its roots to the founding of the Superior Evening Telegram in 1890 by John T. Murphy. He died in 1932, and the business passed to his son John Morgan Murphy, who acquired several other newspapers in the Upper Midwest and also expanded into broadcasting. The company sold off its print interests in 2003, leaving only its former broadcasting division. Nevertheless, it is still legally incorporated as the "Evening Telegram Company."

The company was known as Morgan Murphy Stations until 2007, when its trade name was slightly changed to Morgan Murphy Media.

On May 10, 2017, the company announced that it would acquire Saga Communications' television clusters in Joplin, Missouri, including KOAM-TV, and Victoria, Texas, including KAVU-TV. Saga will additionally acquire the assets of Fox affiliates in each market owned by Surtsey Media and operated by Saga under local marketing agreements, including KFJX in Joplin, Missouri and KVCT in Victoria, Texas. Those stations' license assets were acquired by SagamoreHill Broadcasting. The sale was completed September 1.

In September 2018, it was announced that the company would invest in Good Karma Brands to back its acquisition of the Milwaukee radio stations WKTI and WTMJ.

On October 13, 2021, the company dropped its channels from Dish Network due to a programming dispute. This dispute is in addition to Dish's dispute with Tegna and is the 2nd time that a satellite TV company was involved with such conflicts (DIRECTV had a conflict with the companies' stations in December 2020).

In September 2023, the company acquired The Marks Group's Michigan broadcasting properties—WBKB-TV, WBKP, WBUP, and the Houghton and Iron River radio stations—for $13.375 million. The deal was closed on December 4. Morgan Murphy subsequently took over operations of WJMN-TV, owned by Sullivan's Landing, LLC (following its acquisition from Nexstar Media Group), via joint sales and shared services agreements; WJMN-TV merged its operations into, and was converted into a satellite of, WBUP.

== Television stations ==
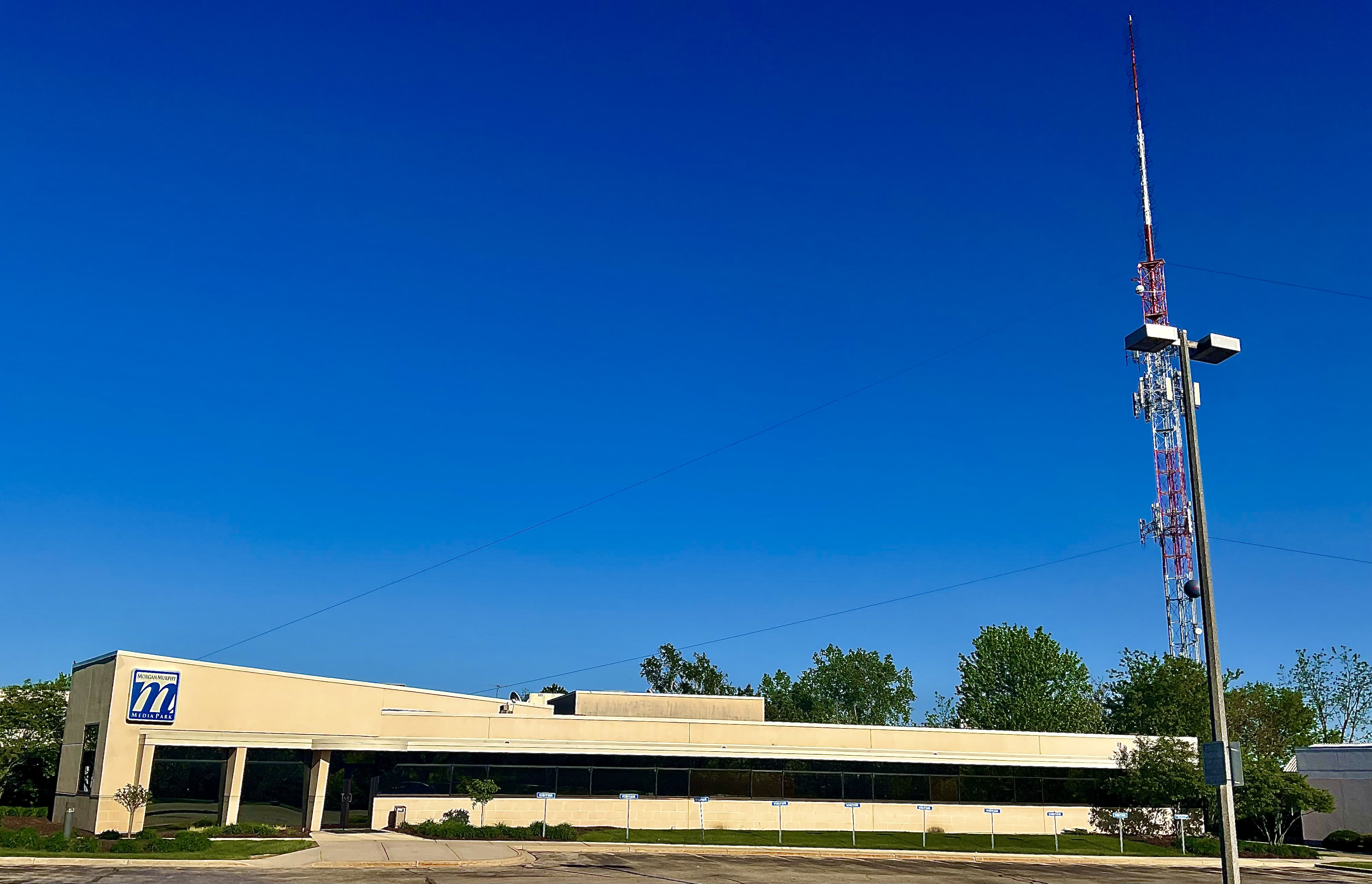
Morgan Murphy Media's headquarters building in Madison, Wisconsin, which is an extension of WISC-TV's studio facility.

Stations are arranged in alphabetical order by state and city of license.

(**) - Indicates a station built and signed on by Morgan Murphy Media (then known as the Evening Telegram Company).

Media market	State	Station	Purchased	Affiliation	Notes
Pittsburg	Kansas	KOAM-TV	2017	CBS	
Pittsburg	Kansas	KFJX	—N/a	Fox	(Note: Owned by SagamoreHill Broadcasting.)
Alpena	Michigan	WBKB-TV	2023	CBS; NBC (DT2); ABC (DT3); Fox (DT4)	
Marquette	Michigan	WJMN-TV	—N/a	ABC; CW+ (DT2); MyNetworkTV (DT3)	(Note: Satellite of WBUP.) (Note: Owned by Sullivan's Landing, LLC.)
Marquette	Michigan	WBKP	2023	CW+; ABC (DT2)	
Marquette	Michigan	WBUP	2023	ABC; CW+ (DT2)	
Victoria	Texas	KMOL-LD	2017	NBC	
Victoria	Texas	KVCT	—N/a	Fox	
Victoria	Texas	KUNU-LD	2017	Univision	
Victoria	Texas	KAVU-TV	2017	ABC	
Victoria	Texas	KQZY-LD	2017	Cozi TV	
Victoria	Texas	KXTS-LD	2017	CBS	
Victoria	Texas	KVTX-LD	2017	Telemundo	
Spokane	Washington	KXLY-TV	1961	ABC	
Spokane	Washington	KXMN-LD	2007	ABC	
Yakima	Washington	KAPP **	1970	ABC	
Kennewick	Washington	KVEW **	1970	ABC	(Note: Semi-satellite of KAPP.)
La Crosse–Eau Claire	Wisconsin	WKBT-DT	2000	CBS	
Madison	Wisconsin	WISC-TV **	1956	CBS; MyNetworkTV (DT2)	

=== Former television stations ===
Media market	State	Station	Purchased	Sold	Notes
Fargo	North Dakota	KTHI-TV	1968	1995	

== Other properties ==
=== Idaho ===
==== Radio ====
- 1080 KVNI - adult contemporary (Coeur d'Alene, run by Queen B Broadcasting of Spokane, Washington)

=== Michigan ===
==== Radio ====
- Houghton
  - 1400 WCCY - top 40
  - 96.3 WHBS — adult contemporary
  - 97.7 WOLV-FM - classic hits
  - 102.3 WHKB - country
- Iron River
  - 1230 WFER - classic country
  - 99.1 WIKB-FM - classic hits

=== Wisconsin ===
==== Radio ====
- Platteville (serving Dubuque, Iowa)
  - 1590 WPVL - sports
  - 106.1 KIYX - classic hits
  - 107.1 WPVL-FM - top 40
- Lancaster
  - 1280 WGLR - silent (as of April 1, 2015)
  - 97.7 WGLR-FM - country
- Milwaukee (as a silent partner with Good Karma Brands)
  - 620 WTMJ - news/talk and sports play-by-play
  - 1510 WGKB - local talk radio for Milwaukee's black community
  - 94.5 WKTI - local sports and some play-by-play

==== Print ====
- Madison Magazine

=== Washington ===
==== Radio ====
- Queen B Broadcasting (Spokane):
  - 700 KXLX - sports
  - 920 KXLY - news/talk
  - 92.9 KZZU - adult top 40
  - 94.5 KHTQ - active rock
  - 96.9 KEZE - rhythmic top 40
  - 99.9 KXLY-FM - country
