= Frank Stone (Wisconsin politician) =

American politician

Frank Stone (April 9, 1876 – March 10, 1937) was an American farmer, businessman, and politician.

Stone was born in Cornwall, England. He went to public schools in Cornwall. In 1895, Stone emigrated to the United States. He then went to business college and became a United States citizen in 1901. Stone was a farmer. He also worked as a foreman in a paper mill and was a bookkeeper in an office. He lived in Park Falls, Wisconsin. Stone served as treasurer of Park Falls from 1901 to 1904. He also served as treasurer of Price County, Wisconsin from 1907 to 1911 and was a Republican. Stone served as mayor of Park Falls and as postmaster of Park Falls from 1929 to 1932. Stone served in the Wisconsin Assembly in 1935 and 1936. Stone died in Park Falls, Wisconsin after being ill for one year.
