= WGLR-FM =

- Lancaster, Wisconsin; United States
- Broadcast area: Upper Mississippi River National Wildlife and Fish Refuge
- Frequency: 97.7 MHz
- Branding: 97-SEVEN COUNTRY

Programming
- Format: Country
- Affiliations: Westwood One; Packers Radio Network

Ownership
- Owner: Morgan Murphy Media; (Queenb Radio Wisconsin, Inc.)
- Sister stations: KIYX, WPVL, WPVL-FM

History
- Former call signs: WAXL (1981–1990)
- Call sign meaning: Grant County-Lancaster Radio

Technical information
- Licensing authority: FCC
- Facility ID: 33052
- Class: C3
- ERP: 11,500 watts
- HAAT: 147 meters (482 ft)
- Transmitter coordinates: 42°51′48.00″N 90°42′11.00″W

Links
- Public license information: Public file; LMS
- Webcast: Listen live
- Website: www.wglr.com

WGLR-FM (97.7 FM) is a commercial radio station broadcasting a country music format licensed to Lancaster, Wisconsin, United States. The station is currently owned by Morgan Murphy Media and features programming from Westwood One.

== History ==
The station went on the air as WAXL on August 17, 1981. On September 1, 1990, the station changed its call sign to the current WGLR-FM. WGLR-FM's music director, Ryan McCall was named "2015 Reporter of the Year" by Music Row magazine during their "Country Breakout Awards" in Nashville.
