= WPVL (AM) =

- Platteville, Wisconsin; United States
- Broadcast area: Dubuque, Iowa
- Frequency: 1590 kHz
- Branding: ESPN Radio AM 1590

Programming
- Format: Sports
- Affiliations: ESPN Radio; Milwaukee Brewers Radio Network

Ownership
- Owner: Morgan Murphy Media; (QueenB Radio Wisconsin, Inc.)
- Sister stations: KIYX, WGLR-FM, WPVL-FM

History
- First air date: 1955 (as WSWW)
- Former call signs: WSWW (1955–1983); WTOQ (1983–1995)

Technical information
- Licensing authority: FCC
- Facility ID: 35514
- Class: B
- Power: 970 watts day 470 watts night
- Transmitter coordinates: 42°45′20.00″N 90°30′20.00″W

Links
- Public license information: Public file; LMS
- Webcast: Listen Live
- Website: am1590wpvl.com

WPVL (1590 AM), is an American radio station broadcasting a sports format. WPVL, which is licensed to Platteville, Wisconsin, is owned by QueenB Radio Wisconsin, Inc. and features programming from ESPN Radio. Former call signs used by WPVL have been WTOQ and WSWW. Prior to their current sports format, the station programmed oldies music.

In April 2012, WPVL was granted a U.S. Federal Communications Commission construction permit to move to a new transmitter site, decrease day power to 970 watts, and decrease night power to 470 watts. That site (off Old Lancaster Road) is now operating not only with the drop of power at night but also moving from use of a single antenna by day onto a two antenna directional array at night.
