= WCQM =

Radio station in Park Falls, Wisconsin

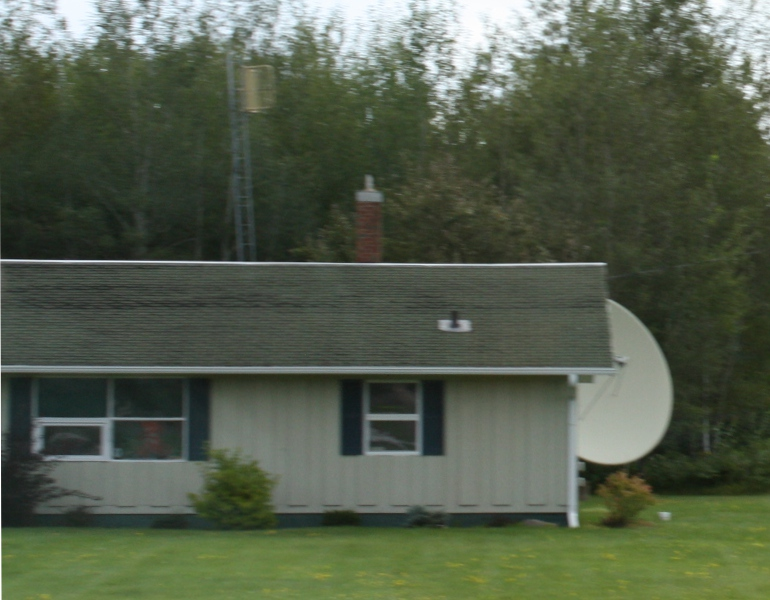
- Studios
- Park Falls, Wisconsin; United States
- Frequency: 98.3 MHz
- Branding: 98Q Country

Programming
- Format: Country music
- Affiliations: ABC News Radio; Milwaukee Brewers Radio Network; Packers Radio Network

Ownership
- Owner: Civic Media, Inc.
- Sister stations: WPFP

History
- First air date: 1968 (as WNBI-FM)
- Former call signs: WNBI-FM (1968–1991)

Technical information
- Licensing authority: FCC
- Facility ID: 48846
- Class: C1
- ERP: 100,000 watts
- HAAT: 134 meters (440 ft)
- Transmitter coordinates: 45°52′56″N 90°26′15″W

Links
- Public license information: Public file; LMS
- Website: www.98qcountry.com

WCQM (98.3 FM) is a radio station broadcasting a country music format. Licensed to Park Falls, Wisconsin, United States, the station is owned by Civic Media.

== History ==
Previous logo

The station originally went on the air in 1968 as WNBI-FM (after having initially been WPFP-FM before signing on; at that time, WPFP AM became WNBI as well). On September 30, 1991, the station changed its call sign to the current WCQM.

Former owner Stephen Marks died on May 11, 2022; he owned the station through Park Falls Community Broadcasting. In 2023, Civic Media bought WCQM and WPFP from Marks' estate for $210,000.
