= WJMN-TV =

Television station in Escanaba, Michigan

Satellite of WBUP, Ishpeming, Michigan
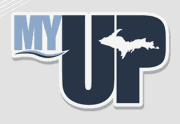
- Escanaba–Marquette, Michigan; United States
- City: Escanaba, Michigan
- Channels: Digital: 32 (UHF); Virtual: 3
- Branding: My UP ABC; My UP News

Programming
- Affiliations: 3.1: ABC; 3.2: The CW Plus; 3.3: Independent with MyNetworkTV

Ownership
- Owner: Sullivans Landing, LLC
- Operator: Morgan Murphy Media
- Sister stations: WBUP; WBKP

History
- First air date: October 7, 1969
- Former call signs: WJMN (CP, 1967–1969)
- Former channel numbers: Analog: 3 (VHF, 1969–2009); Digital: 48 (UHF, 2000–2018)
- Former affiliations: NBC (1969–1983); ABC (1983–1992); CBS (1992–2022); MyNetworkTV (2022–2024)
- Call sign meaning: Jane Morton Norton (member of former ownership family)

Technical information
- Licensing authority: FCC
- Facility ID: 9630
- ERP: 736 kW
- HAAT: 355.7 m (1,167 ft)
- Transmitter coordinates: 46°8′5″N 86°56′56″W

Links
- Public license information: Public file; LMS
- Website: www.myupnow.com

WJMN-TV (channel 3) is a television station licensed to Escanaba, Michigan, United States, serving the Central and Western Upper Peninsula of Michigan as a satellite of ABC affiliate WBUP (channel 10). The station is owned by Sullivans Landing, LLC and operated by Morgan Murphy Media alongside WBUP and CW+ affiliate WBKP (channel 5). The three stations share studios off US 41/M-28 on Wright Street in Marquette Township; WJMN-TV's transmitter is located in unincorporated northern Delta County (south of the Alger County line).

WJMN was originally established in 1969 by Orion Broadcasting as a semi-satellite of WFRV-TV in Green Bay, Wisconsin, to expand its reach into Upper Michigan and far Northeastern Wisconsin. WJMN became more autonomous from WFRV in April 2014, when station owner Nexstar Media Group (who acquired WFRV and WJMN in 2011) launched Upper Peninsula-specific newscasts from a newly-built studio in Marquette.

On January 21, 2022, WJMN lost its CBS affiliation, with the network moving to WZMQ 19.2. Programming from MyNetworkTV and Nexstar-owned NewsNation, as well as a prime time newscast, were used to fill time where CBS programming formerly resided. After the sale of WJMN by Nexstar to Sullivans Landing, it entered into agreements with Morgan Murphy Media to merge the operations of its ABC affiliate WBUP with WJMN in September 2024. Its existing MyNetworkTV programming moved to a digital subchannel, and WBUP's ABC and CW subchannels were mirrored on WJMN.

== History ==
=== Establishment as WFRV-TV satellite ===
As early as 1960, WFRV-TV began to analyze ways to extend its reach in the Upper Peninsula. The station had applied for channel 8 at Iron Mountain, Michigan, which was abandoned after WFRV-TV was sold that year alongside an application for channel 9 in Wausau, Wisconsin. Seven years later, Orion Broadcasting renewed the push by filing for channel 3 at Escanaba on June 20, 1967. A push by Northern Michigan University to use channel 3 instead of 13 for educational television use in the Upper Peninsula delayed approval until April 1969. From a transmitter site and new 1,252-foot (382 m) tower near Trenary, WJMN-TV—so designated in honor of Jane Morton Norton, chairwoman of the board of Orion Broadcasting and a part of the Norton family that founded the company—began broadcasting October 7, bringing a full NBC lineup and WFRV-TV's signal to a further 50,000 households.

Orion Broadcasting reached a deal to merge with Cosmos Broadcasting, a subsidiary of the Liberty Corporation, in 1980. The merger would put the combined company over the limit for the number of VHF television stations it could own, prompting it to immediately announce that it would divest WFRV-WJMN. In January 1981, Cosmos found a buyer: Midwest Radio-Television, owners of WCCO radio and television in Minneapolis. The transaction closed in October.

WJMN's connection to WFRV meant that affiliation switches in Green Bay twice affected viewers in Marquette. In 1983, the two stations switched from NBC to ABC; this prompted the other established station in Marquette, WLUC-TV, to drop its ABC programming for NBC. The two stations then changed network affiliations one more time in 1992, after CBS purchased Midwest Radio-Television. This led to both stations joining CBS, but not at the same time. In Green Bay, WFRV became a CBS affiliate on March 15. However, the Marquette station brought its flip forward several weeks because WLUC-TV was upset at the short notice it received that CBS was disaffiliating. WJMN thus joined CBS on February 23, which required a special feed of WFRV with CBS programming to be sent from Green Bay for transmission.

On April 16, 2007, Liberty Media completed an exchange transaction with CBS Corporation pursuant to which Liberty exchanged 7.6 million shares of CBS Class B common stock valued at $239 million for a subsidiary of CBS that held WFRV and WJMN and approximately $170 million in cash. WFRV and WJMN became the only two over-the-air television stations to be owned by the company.

=== Nexstar ownership, partial separation from WFRV and loss of CBS ===
Nexstar Broadcasting Group announced it would acquire WFRV and WJMN from Liberty Media on April 7, 2011; the $20 million deal was both approved by the FCC and completed the week of July 1, 2011. Nexstar sought and received approval to continue operating WJMN-TV as a satellite station from Green Bay due to a weak regional economy.

On January 23, 2012, WFRV was rebranded to "Local 5". WJMN continued as "Channel 3" until 2014, when the station established its own news service and studios west of Marquette.

Final logo as "Local 3," used after losing CBS to WZMQ 19.2 (2022-2024)

WJMN lost its CBS affiliation on January 21, 2022, because of Nexstar's affiliation agreement with CBS (which had been day-to-day since the last agreement ended on New Year's Day) being renewed without WJMN. CBS then moved to the second digital subchannel of WZMQ (channel 19), owned by Lilly Broadcasting. Consequently, WJMN's 11 p.m. late news was moved to 10 p.m. and expanded to an hour, and CBS programming was replaced with MyNetworkTV, blended with programming from diginets Antenna TV and Rewind TV, also owned by Nexstar.

=== Acquisition by Sullivans Landing and merger into WBUP ===
On April 10, 2024, Nexstar Media Group sold WJMN to Quincy, Illinois–based broadcaster Sullivans Landing, LLC, while retaining ownership of WFRV. Subsequent with the transaction, Sullivans Landing entered into joint sales and shared services agreements with Morgan Murphy Media, which had acquired ABC affiliate WBUP (channel 10) and CW+ affiliate WBKP (channel 5) from The Marks Group in late 2023.

WJMN-TV and WBUP would merge their news departments in September 2024 under the new My UP News banner. On September 16, 2024, to improve the station's coverage, WBUP's ABC and CW subchannels began to be simulcast on WJMN's digital subchannels 3.1 and 3.2 respectively, and MyNetworkTV, along with non-prime syndicated programming moving to 3.3.

== News operation ==
When it announced its purchase of WJMN and WFRV in 2011, Nexstar disclosed plans to expand its local news presence in Marquette. Nexstar's first tangible move toward a WJMN news operation came with a job posting in December 2013 seeking a news director/anchor for early and late weeknight newscasts. The company announced on March 13, 2014, that the station would launch Local 3 News on April 21 originating from new studios west of Marquette (known as the "WJMN-TV Plaza"). At the outset, WJMN's news output consisted of weeknight newscasts at 6 and 11 which are seen in full high definition.

The station retained its local newscasts after losing its CBS affiliation, with the 11 p.m. late newscast moving to 10 p.m. and expanding to an hour. The station also announced that it would simulcast Morning in America from then sister cable news channel NewsNation.

Following the acquisition of WJMN by Sullivans Landing, it was announced in August 2024 that WBUP's news department would be merged into WJMN under the new banner My UP News beginning September 9; with WBUP's ABC subchannel becoming WJMN's primary channel, news output on its MyNetworkTV channel was cut to an hour-long newscast at 6 p.m. and a half-hour 10 p.m. newscast, while the ABC subchannel expanded its morning news to two hours. Weekend newscasts were temporarily suspended, but were expected to return in the future.

== Technical information ==
=== Subchannels ===
The station's signal is multiplexed:

Subchannels of WJMN-TV
Subchannel	Res.	Short name	Programming
3.1	720p	WJMNABC	ABC (WBUP simulcast)
3.2	480i	WJMN-CW	The CW Plus (WBKP simulcast)
3.3	480i	WJMN-MY	Independent with MyNetworkTV

Grade A signal contours for WJMN-TV, originating station WBUP, and associated simulcast.; WJMN 3 Escanaba MI; WBUP 10 Ishpeming MI; WBKP 5.2 Calumet MI

=== Analog-to-digital conversion ===
WJMN signed on its digital signal on UHF channel 48 in 2002; originally, this signal operated at a very low-power from a transmitter west of Downtown Escanaba and was only available in the immediate area. A construction permit in July 2009 allowed the station to increase its power to 1 megawatt and move the digital signal back to its analog transmitter site. However, according to an engineer, this would not happen until sometime in 2010. Therefore, the updated digital signal of 9.8 kilowatts still could only be received in the immediate Escanaba and Gladstone areas.

WJMN-TV ended regular programming on its analog signal, over VHF channel 3, on June 12, 2009, the original target date for full-power television stations in the United States to transition from analog to digital broadcasts under federal mandate (which was later pushed back to June 12). The station's digital signal remained on its pre-transition UHF channel 48, using virtual channel 3.

As part of the SAFER Act, WJMN kept its analog signal on the air until June 30 to inform viewers of the digital television transition through a loop of public service announcements from the National Association of Broadcasters.
