= Park Falls, Wisconsin =

- City
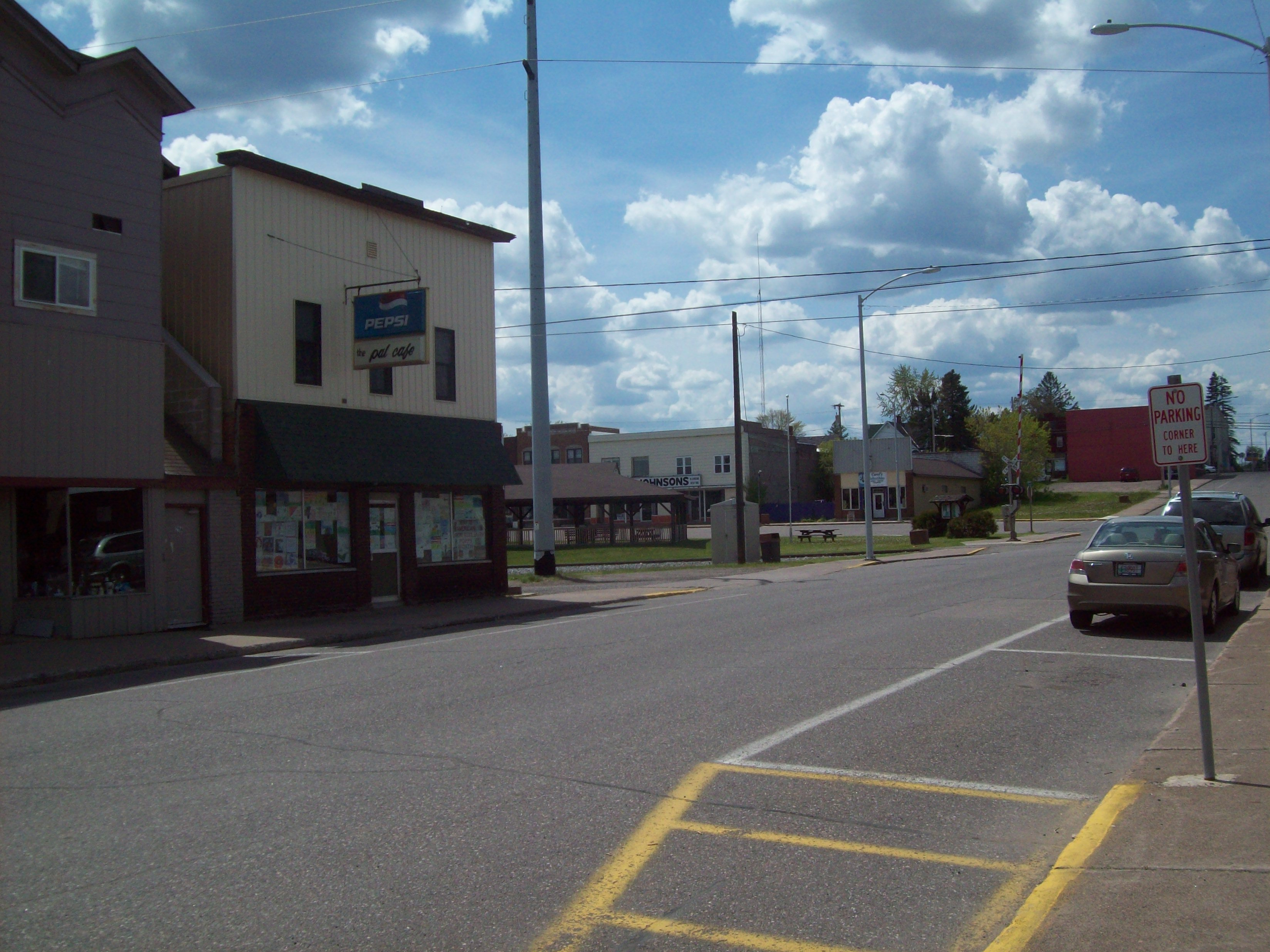

- Location of Park Falls in Price County, Wisconsin

- Location within Wisconsin Location within the United States
- Coordinates: 45°56′5″N 90°26′55″W
- Country: United States
- State: Wisconsin
- County: Price

Government
  - Type: Mayor-Council
  - Mayor: Tara Tervort

Area
  - Total: 3.88 sq mi (10.04 km^{2})
  - Land: 3.65 sq mi (9.45 km^{2})
  - Water: 0.23 sq mi (0.59 km^{2})
- Elevation: 1,516 ft (462 m)

Population (2020)
  - Total: 2,410
  - Density: 661/sq mi (255/km^{2})
- Time zone: UTC-6 (Central (CST))
  - Summer (DST): UTC-5 (CDT)
- Postal code: 54552
- Area codes: 715 & 534
- FIPS code: 55-61200
- GNIS feature ID: 1571039
- Website: cityofparkfallswi.gov

Park Falls is a city in Price County, Wisconsin, United States. The population was 2,410 at the 2020 census, down from 2,462 at 2010. Located in the woods of north central Wisconsin, primarily the Chequamegon National Forest, Park Falls is a small community divided by the North Fork of the Flambeau River, a popular destination for fishing, canoeing and whitewater rafting.

== History ==
The city began in the late 19th century as a small river village called Muskellunge Falls. It was later renamed Park Falls for the scenic beauty surrounding the former falls on the south side of town. With a pulp and paper mill, the town grew rapidly and was incorporated as a city in 1912.

At the height of the city's industrial success the city's population swelled to more than 4,000 residents. At the same time, commercial development fueled a sizeable downtown, which largely remains today.

Several residential neighborhoods, particularly along 1st Avenue North, were constructed of nearly identical homes, and this affordable housing stock is one of the community's lasting assets.

Recent development, which mostly began in the early 1990s, has been primarily concentrated along Wis. Highway 13, a north–south highway that is the city's main thoroughfare.

Several governmental offices are located in Park Falls, including a school district, a National Forest Service office, an outpost of the Wisconsin Department of National Resources, and the northern office of the state governor.

== Geography ==
Park Falls is located at 45°56′5″N 90°26′55″W (45.934590, -90.448538).

According to the United States Census Bureau, the city has a total area of 3.83 square miles (9.92 km^{2}), of which 3.60 square miles (9.32 km^{2}) is land and 0.23 square miles (0.60 km^{2}) is water.

=== Climate ===
Climate data for Park Falls, Wisconsin (1991–2020 normals, extremes 1992–present)
| Month | Jan | Feb | Mar | Apr | May | Jun | Jul | Aug | Sep | Oct | Nov | Dec | Year |
|---|---|---|---|---|---|---|---|---|---|---|---|---|---|
| Record high °F (°C) | 51 (11) | 62 (17) | 79 (26) | 84 (29) | 92 (33) | 94 (34) | 103 (39) | 96 (36) | 91 (33) | 85 (29) | 73 (23) | 57 (14) | 103 (39) |
| Mean daily maximum °F (°C) | 20.2 (−6.6) | 25.4 (−3.7) | 37.3 (2.9) | 50.8 (10.4) | 65.1 (18.4) | 73.6 (23.1) | 77.6 (25.3) | 75.7 (24.3) | 67.3 (19.6) | 53.3 (11.8) | 37.7 (3.2) | 25.4 (−3.7) | 50.8 (10.4) |
| Daily mean °F (°C) | 11.2 (−11.6) | 14.8 (−9.6) | 26.7 (−2.9) | 39.8 (4.3) | 53.9 (12.2) | 62.9 (17.2) | 66.9 (19.4) | 65.1 (18.4) | 56.9 (13.8) | 43.7 (6.5) | 29.9 (−1.2) | 17.6 (−8.0) | 40.8 (4.9) |
| Mean daily minimum °F (°C) | 2.2 (−16.6) | 4.2 (−15.4) | 16.2 (−8.8) | 28.7 (−1.8) | 42.6 (5.9) | 52.1 (11.2) | 56.1 (13.4) | 54.6 (12.6) | 46.5 (8.1) | 34.0 (1.1) | 22.1 (−5.5) | 9.7 (−12.4) | 30.8 (−0.7) |
| Record low °F (°C) | −38 (−39) | −40 (−40) | −26 (−32) | −1 (−18) | 18 (−8) | 31 (−1) | 37 (3) | 34 (1) | 25 (−4) | 8 (−13) | −13 (−25) | −25 (−32) | −40 (−40) |
| Average precipitation inches (mm) | 1.21 (31) | 1.05 (27) | 1.76 (45) | 2.97 (75) | 3.73 (95) | 4.36 (111) | 4.14 (105) | 3.82 (97) | 3.91 (99) | 3.52 (89) | 1.99 (51) | 1.53 (39) | 33.99 (863) |
Source: NOAA

== Demographics ==
Historical population
| Census | Pop. | Note | %± |
|---|---|---|---|
| 1910 | 1,972 | | — |
| 1920 | 2,676 | | 35.7% |
| 1930 | 3,036 | | 13.5% |
| 1940 | 3,252 | | 7.1% |
| 1950 | 2,924 | | −10.1% |
| 1960 | 2,919 | | −0.2% |
| 1970 | 2,953 | | 1.2% |
| 1980 | 3,192 | | 8.1% |
| 1990 | 3,104 | | −2.8% |
| 2000 | 2,793 | | −10.0% |
| 2010 | 2,462 | | −11.9% |
| 2020 | 2,410 | | −2.1% |
U.S. Decennial Census

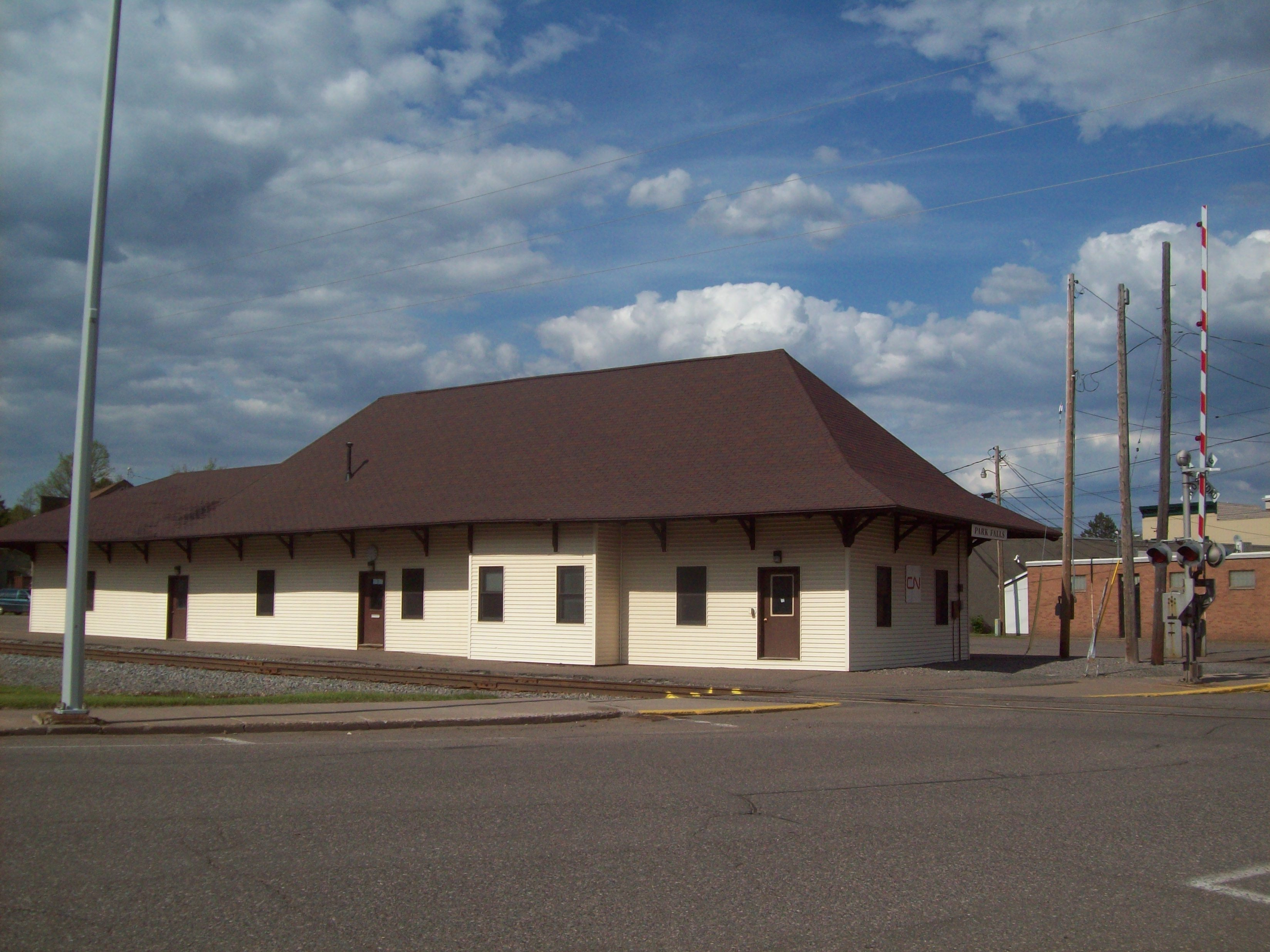
Canadian National station, along the railroad tracks in Park Falls

=== 2010 census ===
As of the census of 2010, there were 2,462 people, 1,096 households, and 622 families residing in the city. The population density was 683.9 inhabitants per square mile (264.1/km^{2}). There were 1,283 housing units at an average density of 356.4 per square mile (137.6/km^{2}). The racial makeup of the city was 94.7% White, 0.4% African American, 0.3% Native American, 0.6% Asian, 2.3% Pacific Islander, and 1.6% from two or more races. Hispanic or Latino people of any race were 1.0% of the population.

There were 1,096 households, of which 25.7% had children under the age of 18 living with them, 43.7% were married couples living together, 8.4% had a female householder with no husband present, 4.7% had a male householder with no wife present, and 43.2% were non-families. 36.9% of all households were made up of individuals, and 17.6% had someone living alone who was 65 years of age or older. The average household size was 2.15 and the average family size was 2.78.

The median age in the city was 46.9 years. 21.4% of residents were under the age of 18; 5.2% were between the ages of 18 and 24; 19.9% were from 25 to 44; 30.7% were from 45 to 64; and 22.8% were 65 years of age or older. The gender makeup of the city was 48.9% male and 51.1% female.

=== 2000 census ===
As of the census of 2000, there were 2,793 people, 1,185 households, and 718 families residing in the city. The population density was 787.1 people per square mile (303.8/km^{2}). There were 1,302 housing units at an average density of 366.9 per square mile (141.6/km^{2}). The racial makeup of the city was 97.99% White, 0.11% African American, 0.43% Native American, 0.86% Asian, 0.04% Pacific Islander, 0.07% from other races, and 0.50% from two or more races. Hispanic or Latino people of any race were 1.07% of the population.

There were 1,185 households, out of which 28.9% had children under the age of 18 living with them, 47.1% were married couples living together, 8.9% had a female householder with no husband present, and 39.4% were non-families. 35.2% of all households were made up of individuals, and 20.9% had someone living alone who was 65 years of age or older. The average household size was 2.24 and the average family size was 2.88.

In the city, the population was spread out, with 23.4% under the age of 18, 6.2% from 18 to 24, 24.3% from 25 to 44, 22.3% from 45 to 64, and 23.9% who were 65 years of age or older. The median age was 42 years. For every 100 females, there were 88.5 males. For every 100 females age 18 and over, there were 86.7 males.

The median income for a household in the city was $33,860, and the median income for a family was $42,930. Males had a median income of $31,855 versus $20,959 for females. The per capita income for the city was $17,929. About 5.5% of families and 10.3% of the population were below the poverty line, including 16.1% of those under age 18 and 6.5% of those age 65 or over.

== Industry ==
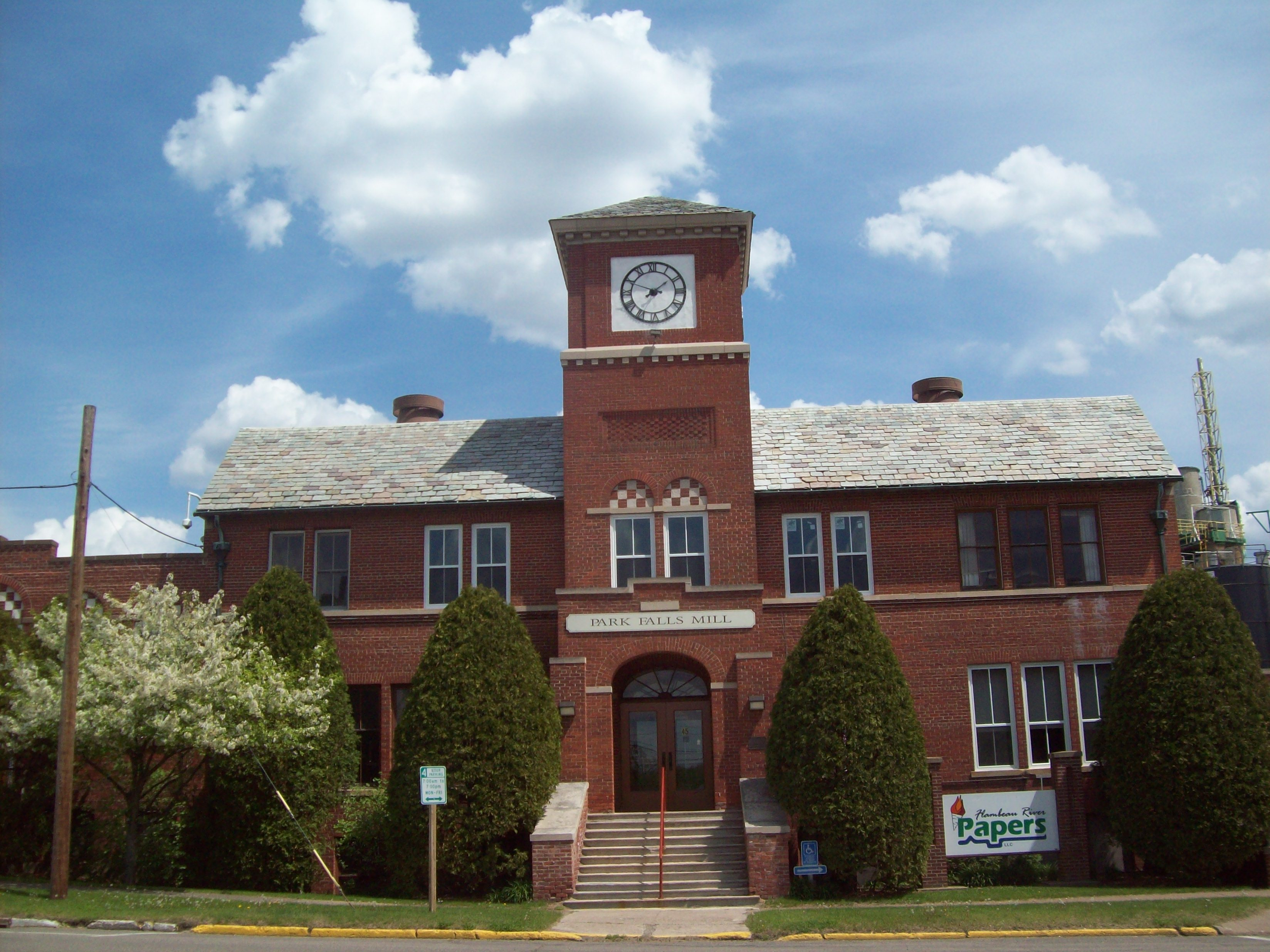
The offices of Flambeau River Papers

The Flambeau River Papers Corporation (formerly Flambeau Paper Company), a namesake of the Flambeau River, was once the largest employer in the area. The mill, which closed in early 2006, underwent many name changes throughout its more than 100-year history. Its closure was a significant economic shock for the community. Local and state officials offered relocation, and educational and mental health services for displaced workers. A buyer was found for the mill and it was reopened in August 2006 as Flambeau River Papers.

Park Falls is also home to St. Croix Rod, a fishing rod company, and a factory for Weather Shield, a window manufacturer.

== Education ==
The Park Falls School District is geographically the largest school district in Wisconsin. The school district combined with the Glidden School District, creating the Chequamegon School District starting from the 2009–10 school year.

== Transportation ==
Bus service is provided by Bay Area Rural Transit.

=== Airport ===
Park Falls is served by the Park Falls Municipal Airport (KPKF). Located two miles northeast of the city, the airport handles approximately 6,750 operations per year, with roughly 97% general aviation and 3% air taxi. The airport has a 3,200 foot asphalt runway with approved GPS approaches (Runway 18-36).

== Media ==
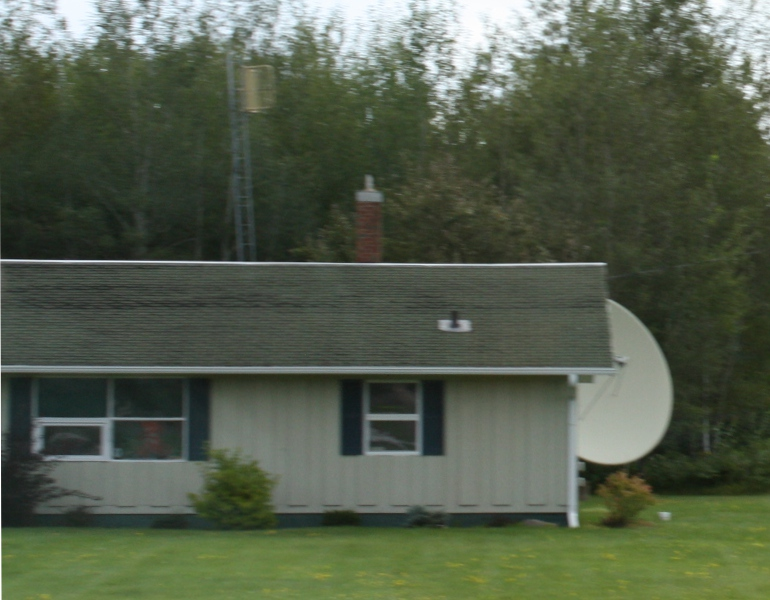
WPFP and WCQM studios

- WPFP AM 980, FM 103.1, Variety Hits
- WCQM FM 98.3, Country

== Sports and recreation ==
The abundance of public forests and several lakes, including the Turtle-Flambeau Flowage to the east of the city, has made Park Falls a destination for outdoor enthusiasts. Hunting, fishing, snowmobiling and ATV riding are popular attractions and the town is connected to an extensive system of off-highway vehicle (OHV) trails.

The Chequamegon Screaming Eagles (formerly the Park Falls Cardinals and Glidden Black Bears due to a consolidation), have a long-standing rivalry with the Phillips Loggers.

== Events ==
Park Falls celebrates its community festival, Flambeau Rama, every year during the first weekend in August. Many high school class reunions are held during the four-day event.

== Notable people ==
- Shane Frederick, MIT management science professor
- David Greenwood, NFL safety
- Eric E. Hagedorn, politician and electrical engineer
- Eric Jarosinski, writer and social media personality
- Luke Timothy Johnson, theologian and writer
- Dennis Morgan, actor-singer
- Frank Stone, businessman, farmer, and politician
- Helen F. Thompson, businesswoman, teacher, and politician
- Magnus Wenninger, mathematician and priest

== Images ==
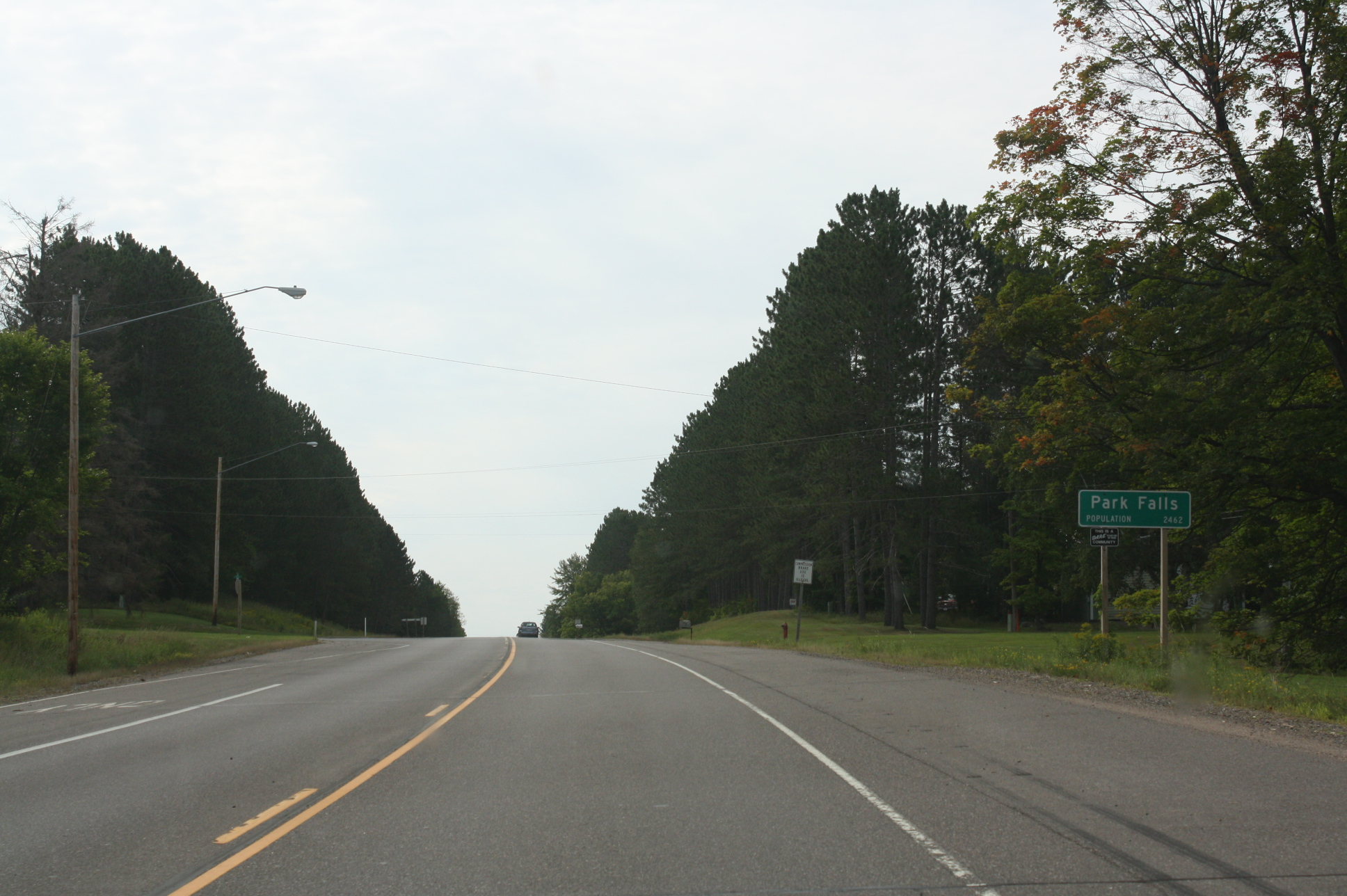
Sign on WIS 13

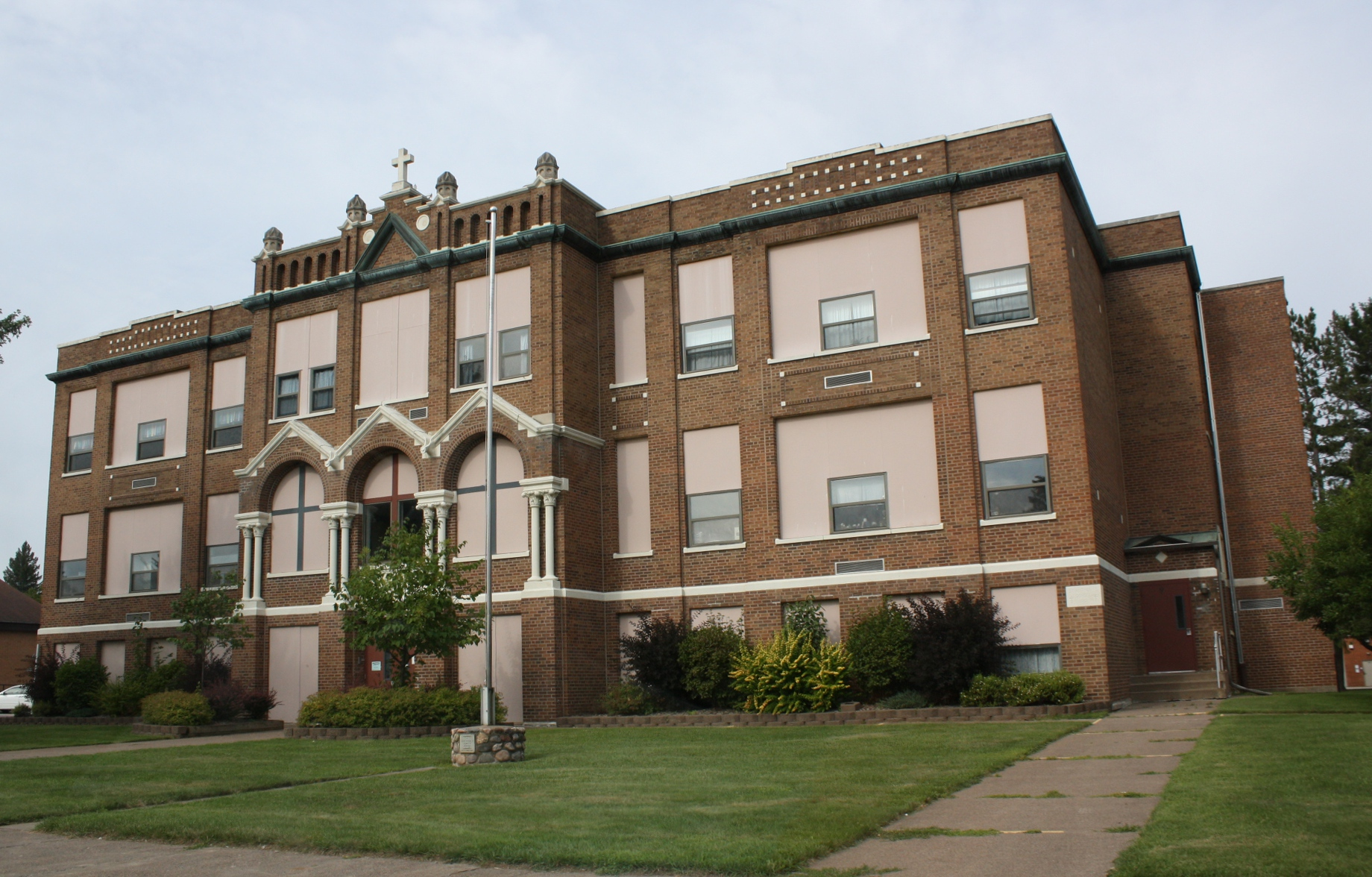
School

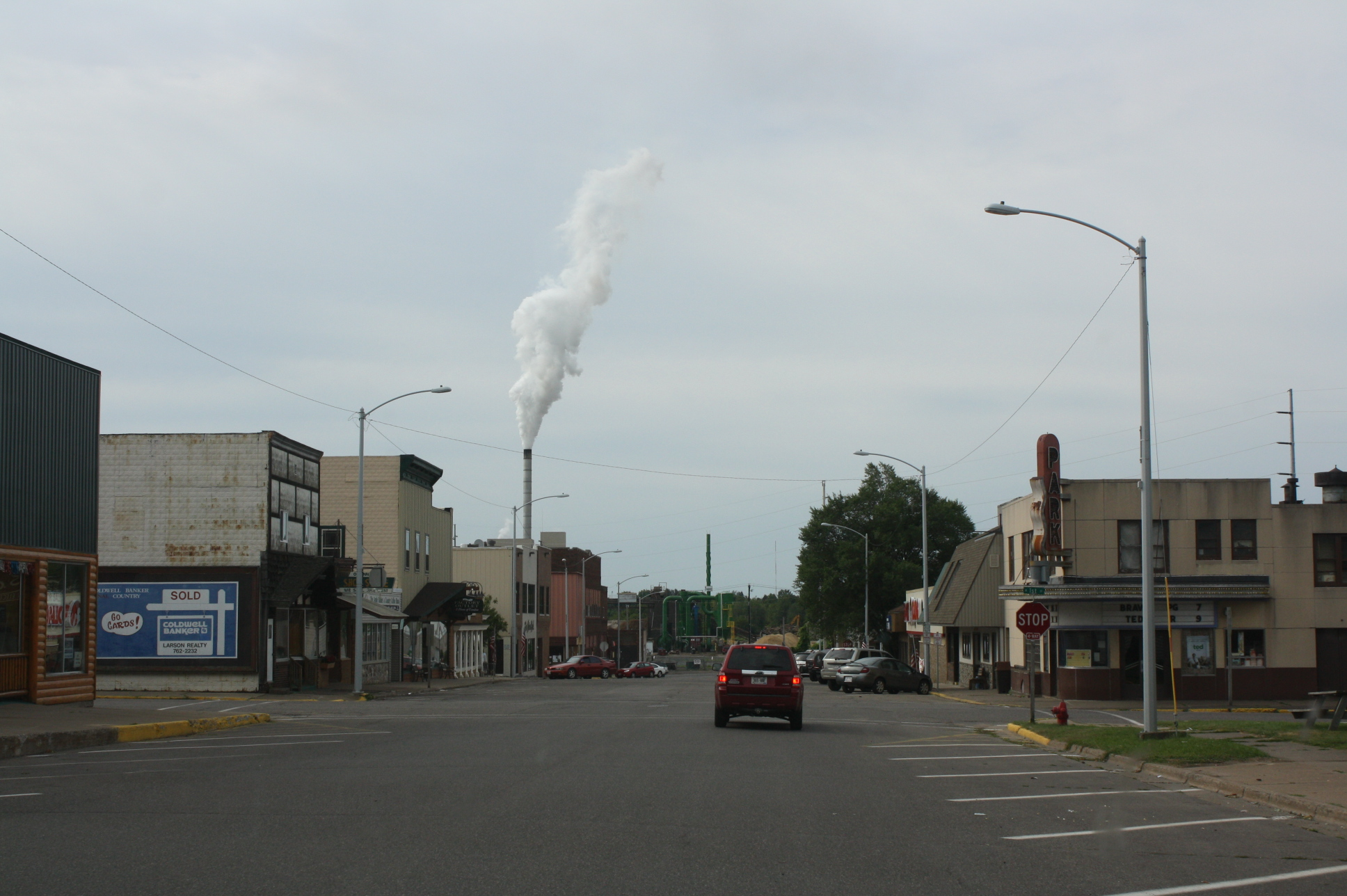
Downtown
