= WPFP =

Radio station in Park Falls, Wisconsin

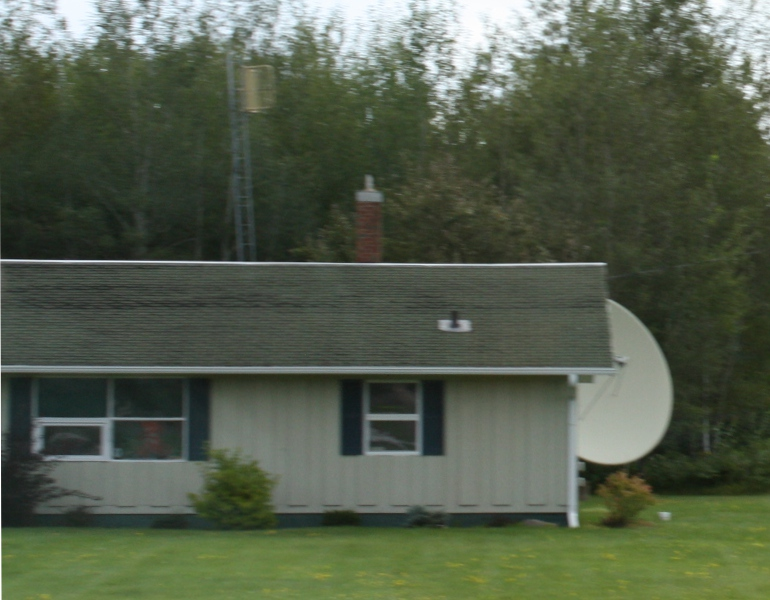
- Studios
- Park Falls, Wisconsin; United States
- Frequency: 980 kHz
- Branding: 103.1 Trail Mix

Programming
- Format: Variety hits

Ownership
- Owner: Civic Media, Inc.
- Sister stations: WCQM

History
- First air date: 1953
- Former call signs: WPFP (1953–1968); WNBI (1968–2010)

Technical information
- Licensing authority: FCC
- Facility ID: 48847
- Class: D
- Power: 1,000 watts day; 105 watts night
- Transmitter coordinates: 45°55′4″N 90°26′58″W
- Translator: 103.1 W276DJ (Park Falls)

Links
- Public license information: Public file; LMS
- Webcast: Listen live
- Website: trailmix.fm

WPFP (980 AM) is a radio station broadcasting a variety hits format. Licensed to Park Falls, Wisconsin, United States, the station is owned by Civic Media.

== History ==
WPFP changed its format from sports talk to conservative talk on July 1, 2010. The station broadcast as WNBI from 1968 to 2010, when it reverted to its original call sign.

On October 22, 2018, WPFP changed its format from talk to variety hits, branded as "103.1 Jack FM" in reflection of its simulcast on FM translator W276DJ (103.1).

Former owner Stephen Marks died on May 11, 2022; he owned the station through Park Falls Community Broadcasting. In 2023, Civic Media bought WPFP and WCQM from Marks' estate for $210,000. In February 2024, WPFP rebranded as "103.1 Trail Mix".
