= WBKP =

Television station in Calumet, Michigan

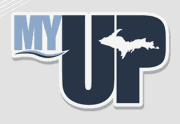
- Calumet, Michigan; United States
- Channels: Digital: 5 (VHF); Virtual: 5
- Branding: Upper Peninsula CW 5; My UP ABC (5.2)

Programming
- Affiliations: 5.1: The CW Plus; 5.2: ABC; 5.3: Independent with MyNetworkTV

Ownership
- Owner: Morgan Murphy Media; (Queen Bee's Knees LLC)
- Sister stations: WBUP; WJMN-TV

History
- Founded: April 26, 1996
- First air date: October 30, 1996
- Former channel numbers: Analog: 5 (VHF, 1996–2009); Digital: 11 (UHF, 2001–2009); Translator: 28 W28BX Marquette (UHF, 1997–2003)
- Former affiliations: ABC (1996–2007)
- Call sign meaning: Beautiful Keweenaw Peninsula; disambiguation of sister stations WBUP and WBKB-TV

Technical information
- Licensing authority: FCC
- Facility ID: 76001
- ERP: 6.4 kW
- HAAT: 301 m (988 ft)
- Transmitter coordinates: 47°2′11.0″N 88°41′43.0″W
- Translator(s): WBUP-DT 10.2 (VHF) Ishpeming

Links
- Public license information: Public file; LMS
- Website: www.myupnow.com

WBKP (channel 5) is a television station licensed to Calumet, Michigan, United States, serving the Central and Western Upper Peninsula of Michigan as an affiliate of The CW Plus. It is owned by Morgan Murphy Media alongside Ishpeming-licensed ABC affiliate WBUP (channel 10) and operated with WJMN-TV (channel 3). The three stations share studios on Wright Street in west Marquette; WBKP's transmitter is located on Tolonen Hill near unincorporated Painesdale in Adams Township.

Since WBKP cannot be seen over the air in Marquette, it is also carried on the second digital subchannels of WBUP (whose transmitter is situated south of Ely Township in unincorporated Marquette County) and WJMN (whose transmitter is located in northern Delta County).

== History ==
WBKP (standing for "Beautiful Keweenaw Peninsula") launched on October 30, 1996, as an ABC affiliate and the market's fourth television station. Its initial facilities were in the historic Calumet and Hecla Bath House. The Monday Night Football game that night between the Dallas Cowboys and Philadelphia Eagles was the first ABC program shown on the station. Before WBKP launched, the Central Upper Peninsula could see the network from affiliations of WLUC-TV (channel 6) in Marquette, and before 1992 from WJMN-TV (channel 3) in Escanaba (a semi-satellite of WFRV-TV in Green Bay, Wisconsin) that was purchased by CBS and switched to that network in March 1992.

More specifically, ABC was originally seen on WLUC through a secondary nature from its sign-on in 1956 until 1992 at which point ABC began to be carried as a primary affiliation. WLUC dropped its ABC affiliation in 1995 which ushered in WBKP as the next ABC outlet. Originally, WBKP was locally owned by the Scanlan family as sister to Traverse City's ABC affiliate WGTU (and its full-time satellite WGTQ in Sault Ste. Marie) as well as CBS affiliate WBKB-TV in Alpena. At its sign-on, WBKP was the first station in the market to broadcast in stereo and remain on-the-air 24 hours a day.

In August 1997, in order to cover Marquette proper, it launched a repeater station, W28BX. This could be seen on UHF channel 28 and this low-power over-the-air signal was very weak so it could only be picked up in that city and Negaunee. In September 2001, the station moved its studios to the Marquette Mall. However, four employees remained based at the Calumet facility which then began operating as a bureau. In the spring of 2003, WBKP replaced the low-power repeater with full-time satellite WBUP in Ishpeming. This aired a full-powered analog signal on VHF channel 10 and covered a larger broadcasting radius. At this point, WBKP/WBUP took the on-air branding "ABC 5&10".

In January 2004, the Scanlan family sold WBKP/WBUP and WBKB to Lake Superior Community Broadcasting, a company owned by Stephen Marks of Maryland. In July 2007, the two stations split in order to establish separate brandings, with WBKP becoming a CW affiliate (as part of The CW Plus) while WBUP remained with ABC. However, both WBKP and WBUP continued to carry the two networks over their digital signals.

In September 2023, it was announced that The Marks Group would sell its Michigan broadcasting properties—WBKP, WBUP, WBKB-TV, and radio stations in Houghton and Iron River—to Morgan Murphy Media for $13.375 million. The sale was completed on December 4.

== News operation ==
In July 1997, WBKP established its first news department in an attempt to offer an alternative to longtime dominant WLUC. The NBC affiliate has led the area in Nielsen ratings for newscasts by a wide margin for its entire existence. For most of its history, then-CBS affiliate WJMN only provided brief Upper Peninsula-specific news and weather cut-ins that were taped in advance. WJMN finally began airing full, live newscasts (seen weeknights at 6 and 11) with a Marquette focus on April 21, 2014.

Seeking to fill a void in a market supposedly capable of supporting two television newsrooms, WBKP initially offered local news weeknights at 6 and 11. After moving from Calumet to Marquette in September 2001, the station introduced a new set, a new graphics package, and an updated logo. However, in March 2002, WBKP shut down its news operation due to low ratings and budget cuts. This move was also due in part to the continual dominance of WLUC which has always operated a much larger news department and maintained consistent viewership.

Shortly after acquired WBKP/WBUP, a second attempt at airing newscasts was launched. This time, shows known as UGN News (with "UGN" meaning "Upper Great <Lakes> Network") were simulcasted with WBKB in Alpena. Likewise, the programs featured regionalized news and weather coverage from the entire Upper and Northern Lower Peninsulas. In 2006, UGN News was re-focused to the Upper Peninsula and only originated from WBKP/WBUP.

After becoming a separate station and the primary producer of newscasts, WBUP re-branded its newscasts to ABC 10 News NOW. In December 2007, the ABC affiliate began producing the market's first prime time newscast on WBKP. Known as CW 5 News NOW, this thirty-minute program was seen weeknights at 10 p.m. On September 8, 2009, rival WLUC added a half-hour local newscast seen at the same time to its Fox-affiliated second digital subchannel. In order to cover the Keweenaw Peninsula, WBUP also operates an advertising sales office and news bureau on East Montezuma Avenue in Houghton (sharing a building with radio sister stations WOLV, WHKB, and WCCY). Like all CW Plus stations, WBKP aired the nationally syndicated weekday morning show, The Daily Buzz, until its cancellation on April 17, 2015.

== Technical information ==
=== Subchannels ===
The station's signal is multiplexed:

Subchannels of WBKP
Subchannel	Res.	Short name	Programming
5.1	480i	WBKP-CW	The CW Plus (4:3)
5.2	720p	WBKPABC	ABC (WBUP)
5.3	720p	WJMN-MY	Independent with MyNetworkTV

Simulcast of subchannels of another station

Grade A signal contours for WJMN-TV, originating station WBUP, and associated simulcast.; WJMN 3 Escanaba MI; WBUP 10 Ishpeming MI; WBKP 5 Calumet MI

=== Analog-to-digital conversion ===
WBKP shut down its analog signal, over VHF channel 5, on June 12, 2009, the official date on which full-power television stations in the United States transitioned from analog to digital broadcasts under federal mandate. The station's digital signal relocated from its pre-transition VHF channel 11 to VHF channel 5. Since it was granted an original construction permit after the Federal Communications Commission (FCC) finalized the DTV allotment plan on April 21, 1997, the station did not receive a companion channel for a digital television station. While transmitting in analog, its signal could be received across Lake Superior in Thunder Bay, Ontario, and the surrounding areas in Canada.
