= WBKB-TV =

Television station in Alpena, Michigan

- Alpena, Michigan; United States
- Channels: Digital: 11 (VHF); Virtual: 11
- Branding: WBKB 11; UpNorth Live Alpena

Programming
- Affiliations: 11.1: CBS; 11.2: NBC; 11.3: ABC; 11.4: Fox/MyNetworkTV

Ownership
- Owner: Morgan Murphy Media; (Queen Bee's Knees LLC)
- Sister stations: WBUP; WBKP; WJMN-TV

History
- Founded: November 20, 1974
- First air date: September 22, 1975
- Former channel numbers: Analog: 11 (VHF, 1975–2009); Digital: 13 (VHF, 2002–2009)

Technical information
- Licensing authority: FCC
- Facility ID: 67048
- ERP: 20 kW
- HAAT: 201.8 m (662 ft)
- Transmitter coordinates: 44°42′11″N 83°31′26″W

Links
- Public license information: Public file; LMS
- Website: www.wbkb11.com

WBKB-TV (channel 11) is a television station in Alpena, Michigan, United States, affiliated with four commercial broadcast television networks, being CBS, NBC, ABC and Fox. Owned by Morgan Murphy Media, the station maintains studios on North Bagley Street in Alpena, and its transmitter is located in unincorporated Alcona County (near M-72) south of Hubbard Lake.

WBKB is the only commercial over-the-air television station in the third smallest media market in the United States; the Alpena market consists of Alpena and Alcona counties. The station shares the market with the cable-only CW+ affiliate Alpena CW ("WBAE"), which is controlled by local cable provider Charter Spectrum and offers limited local advertising, along with WCML, a PBS member station which is a satellite of Mount Pleasant–based WCMU-TV.

== History ==
Thunder Bay Broadcasting Corporation was formed in the State of Michigan in September 1971 by Thomas Scanlan, a U.S. Air Force Captain stationed in Indianapolis, for the express purpose of establishing a commercial television station in Alpena, Michigan. At the time Alpena and its surrounding area was one of the last places in the Eastern United States without any over-the-air television service, as defined by the Federal Communications Commission (FCC). Such areas were called 'white areas'. Scanlan had just completed a tour of duty in Germany, where he and three other active-duty airmen, Thomas Disinger, S. Peter Neumann and Curtis Smith had been engaged in creating the first use of live satellite feeds to Europe of events specifically targeted to military personnel stationed in Europe. This first use was the live Apollo 11 Moon walk and events surrounding it from blast off to touchdown.

Beside his stock and stock reserved for Disinger, Neumann and Smith, Scanlan sold off stock to 43 other stockholders, mostly residents of Alpena. The construction permit application was filed on September 22, 1971, and specified using the tower of WHSB (107.7 FM) at Manning Hill, near Lachine, Michigan, some 15 miles (24 km) west of Alpena. Expectations were that the permit would be granted and the station could be on the air by the summer of 1972, most likely as an ABC affiliate. On November 22, 1971, a competing application was filed for Channel 11 by a group headed by cable operator Bruce Freel. Freel's North American Broadcasting Company specified a much larger coverage area than that applied for by Scanlan, with a 792-foot (241 m) tower near Millersburg, and coverage extending well to the west of Interstate 75. To maximize its opportunity to receive a grant in the event the FCC designated the two applications for a hearing, Scanlan amended the Thunder Bay application in 1972 to specify a shared tower with Alpena's non-commercial WCML-TV channel 6. With both Freel's and Scanlan's group applying for facilities that would duplicate, to a small degree, that of Traverse City's WGTU (channel 29), WGTU president Thomas Kiple urged his group, Northern Entertainment, to ask the FCC to invoke their "UHF Impact Policy" on the applications. The UHF Impact Policy is no longer active, but at the time, the FCC would entertain applications to limit or deny applications from proposed VHF facilities seeking new or improved facilities that would duplicate existing or planned UHF coverage.

At this same time Freel's group was facing mounting expenses in his cable and real estate businesses, and Freel offered to sell out to Scanlan's group for its out-of-pocket expenses, which the FCC approved almost immediately. This would allow Thunder Bay to proceed with its construction. Within a matter of weeks Northern Entertainment filed its UHF Impact Request with the FCC.

This action set in motion a competitive posture between Thunder Bay and Northern Entertainment. To break the logjam of inactivity, Thunder Bay voluntarily again modified its application to specify a smaller, peanut-shaped coverage area from a 500-foot (150 m) tower at Barton City, about 25 miles (40 km) south of Alpena. This reduced the percentage of overlap with WGTU's signal to 4.7 percent. On July 19, 1974, the FCC set aside Northern's objections and granted Thunder Bay its permit. Construction began that September.

WBKB-TV finally signed-on September 22, 1975, broadcasting on channel 11 from a transmitter at its studios on North Bagley Street. It was the first of two stations in Alpena to sign-on that year (WCMU-TV would sign-on satellite station WCML in November). The station has always been a CBS affiliate. In 1982, Scanlan's group sold controlling interest in Thunder Bay to Stephen Marks of Maryland.

After the switch to digital-only broadcasting on June 12, 2009, WBKB-TV moved its digital signal, formerly on channel 13, to channel 11. WBKB-TV signed-on a new second digital subchannel to serve as the area's primary Fox and secondary MyNetworkTV affiliate that November. Until that point, Cadillac's WFQX-TV had been serving as the default Fox affiliate, operating a translator in Alpena, W31BO (channel 31), between 1996 and 2005. In addition, WFQX's full-powered satellite WFUP in Vanderbilt served areas around greater Alpena although not in the city proper.

Despite the existence of WBKB-TV's Fox channel, Charter systems still carry WFQX in standard and high definition to this day. MyNetworkTV can also still be seen in the market on Spectrum through the "My5" subchannel of WNEM-TV from Bay City. That outlet served as the area's default MyNetworkTV outlet since the service signed-on back in September 2006.

On January 14, 2013, WBKB-TV added a new third digital subchannel to be the area's ABC affiliate, returning over-the-air ABC service to Alpena for the first time since WGTU translator W55AW (channel 55) left the air in the mid-1970s. In the interim, WJRT-TV in Flint served as the market's default affiliate on Charter with standard and high definition feeds.

On January 24, 2022, WBKB announced on their Facebook page that WBKB 11.2 would be joining NBC. The change took effect the next day, giving the Alpena market its first NBC affiliate and NBC in-market affiliates in all 210 Nielsen DMAs. Fox and MyNetworkTV were moved to a new fourth subchannel with the change. Prior to this, WTOM-TV in Cheboygan, a satellite of WPBN-TV in Traverse City, had served the Alpena area on cable.

In September 2023, it was announced that The Marks Group would sell its Michigan broadcasting properties—WBKB-TV, WBUP, WBKP, and radio stations in Houghton and Iron River—to Morgan Murphy Media for $13.375 million. The sale was completed on December 4. For regulatory purposes, the station is owned by MMM's Queen Bee Media division, which originates a similar seven-station cluster (in this case, including The CW, Telemundo, and Univision) in Victoria, Texas originating from KAVU-TV across two full-power and five low-power stations.

=== Legacy of WBKB callsign ===
The WBKB call letters originally belonged (from 1946 until 1953) to channel 4 in Chicago. That station was owned by the Balaban and Katz Broadcasting subsidiary of Paramount Pictures and is now CBS owned-and-operated station WBBM-TV. WBKB then transferred to Chicago's ABC owned-and-operated station on channel 7 from 1953 to 1968 until it was renamed WLS-TV.

== Newscasts ==
Shortly after Stephen Marks acquired WBKB, newscasts known as UGN News (with "UGN" meaning "Upper Great (Lakes) Network") began to be simulcast with WBKP/WBUP in Marquette. Likewise, the programs featured regional news and weather coverage from the entire Upper and Northern Lower Peninsulas. In 2006, UGN News was re-focused to the Upper Peninsula and only originated from WBKP/WBUP. WBKB-TV only offered local news weeknights at 6 p.m. and every night at 11 p.m. until 2013, with its on-air personnel acting as "one-man-band" multimedia journalists performing all duties, such as shooting video, editing coverage, and producing the newscasts.

With the addition of ABC programming to its third digital subchannel, WBKB began to carry a morning newscast simulcast on its NBC channel. The nightly newscasts were simulcast on WBKB's CBS, NBC and ABC channels, with the show tape-delayed on a network feed if a show or event ran long. In March 2019, the station upgraded their news operation to high definition, among the last in the United States to do so.

After Morgan Murphy's acquisition of WBKB-TV, a news partnership with Sinclair Broadcast Group's Traverse City-based NBC affiliate WPBN-TV/WTOM-TV (known on-air as UpNorthLive News) was unveiled on April 4, 2024, and began in earnest on April 29. WBKB's Alpena news operation became a bureau for WPBN/WTOM and still originates news stories and some newscasts, with all WPBN/WTOM newscasts airing on WBKB 11.2 (matching the former's NBC affiliation) and other newscasts also simulcast on the station's CBS and ABC channels and continuing to air delayed in overflow situations. WPBN/WTOM also took over weather responsibilities for WBKB-TV, which had been fulfilled by a mix of contracted meteorologists and forecasts compiled by NewsNet in Cadillac over the last few years and struggled to remain staffed full-time. Lower-third and time and temperature graphics also feature Alpena and other cities in the market different from those seen on WPBN/WTOM. WBKB's Fox channel continues to feature no news programming.

== Subchannels ==
The station's signal is multiplexed:

Subchannels of WBKB-TV
| Subchannel | Res. | Short name | Programming |
|---|---|---|---|
| 11.1 | 1080i | WBKB-HD | CBS |
| 11.2 | 1080i | WBKB-NB | NBC |
| 11.3 | 720p | WBKB-AB | ABC |
| 11.4 | 720p | WBKB-FX | Fox & MyNetworkTV |
