= WBUP =

Television station in Ishpeming, Michigan

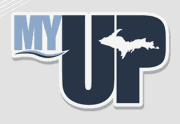

- Ishpeming–Marquette, Michigan; United States
- City: Ishpeming, Michigan
- Channels: Digital: 10 (VHF); Virtual: 10
- Branding: My UP ABC; My UP News; CW 5 (10.2)

Programming
- Affiliations: 10.1: ABC; 10.2: The CW Plus; 3.3: Independent with MyNetworkTV

Ownership
- Owner: Morgan Murphy Media; (Queen Bee's Knees LLC)
- Sister stations: WBKP, WJMN-TV

History
- Founded: March 6, 2000
- First air date: January 2, 2003
- Former channel numbers: Analog: 10 (VHF, 2003–2009)
- Call sign meaning: Beautiful Upper Peninsula

Technical information
- Licensing authority: FCC
- Facility ID: 59281
- ERP: 9 kW
- HAAT: 235 m (771 ft)
- Transmitter coordinates: 46°29′26.1″N 87°53′36.5″W
- Translator(s): WBKP 5.2 Calumet

Links
- Public license information: Public file; LMS
- Website: www.myupnow.com

WBUP (channel 10) is a television station licensed to Ishpeming, Michigan, United States, serving as the ABC affiliate for the Central and Western Upper Peninsula of Michigan. It is owned by Morgan Murphy Media alongside Calumet-licensed CW+ affiliate WBKP (channel 5) and operated with WJMN-TV (channel 3). The three stations share studios on Wright Street in west Marquette; WBUP's transmitter is located south of Ely Township in unincorporated Marquette County.

Since WBUP cannot be seen over-the-air in the Keweenaw Peninsula, it is simulcast on WBKP's second digital subchannel (5.2) from a transmitter on Tolonen Hill near Painesdale of Adams Township. In turn, WBKP's first subchannel (The CW) is carried on WBUP's second subchannel. Since the merger of the three stations, WJMN has also simulcast WBUP and WBKP on its first and second digital subchannels, giving it UHF coverage in the eastern Upper Peninsula and Escanaba.

== History ==
In August 1997, the area's original ABC affiliate WBKP launched translator station W28BX on channel 28 in Marquette to cover the city proper. Since this low-power over-the-air signal was very weak, it could only be picked up in Marquette and Negaunee. On January 2, 2003, WBKP replaced the low-power translator with full-time satellite WBUP. This aired a full-power analog signal on VHF channel 10 and, at this point, WBUP and WBKP took the on-air branding "ABC 5&10".

In January 2004, the Scanlan family (who also owned WGTU/WGTQ in the Northern Lower Peninsula) sold WBUP/WBKP and WBKB-TV in Alpena to Lake Superior Community Broadcasting, a company owned by Stephen Marks of Maryland. In July 2007, the two stations split with WBKP becoming a CW affiliate (as part of The CW Plus national service) while WBUP remained with ABC.

On February 11, 2013, at about 8:35 p.m., WBUP became a victim of broadcast signal intrusion when an unidentified hacker had hijacked the Emergency Alert System network to transmit a false EAS message. This was broadcast during an episode of The Bachelor which simply stated that "the bodies of the dead are rising from their graves and attacking the living. Do not attempt to approach these bodies, as they are considered extremely dangerous." It was revealed that a default password for the networks was being used, and a few minutes later, the station sent an official on-screen message apologizing for any confusion. The attack also happened during prime time programming locally on WNMU-TV, KENW in Portales, New Mexico, and KRTV in Great Falls, Montana. The hacker was arrested several days later and sentenced to six months probation.

In September 2023, it was announced that The Marks Group would sell its Michigan broadcasting properties—WBUP, WBKP, WBKB-TV, and radio stations in Houghton and Iron River—to Morgan Murphy Media for $13.375 million. The sale was completed on December 4. Nexstar Media Group's WJMN-TV—a former CBS affiliate—was sold in April 2024 to Sullivan's Landing, LLC, which then entered into a shared services agreement with Morgan Murphy Media. On September 16, 2024, WJMN became a satellite of WBUP, moving its existing MyNetworkTV programming to 3.3, and simulcasting WBUP and WBKP on 3.1 and 3.2 respectively.

== News operation ==
Former logo as "ABC 10" (2020-2024)

WBUP established a news operation in 2004 shortly after The Marks Group acquired WBUP and WBKP. The shows were originally known as UGN News (with "UGN" meaning "Upper Great <Lakes> Network") and were simulcast with WBKB. Likewise, the programs featured regionalized news and weather coverage from the entire Upper and Northern Lower Peninsulas. In 2006, UGN News was re-focused to the Upper Peninsula and only originated from WBUP/WBKP. After becoming a separate station and the primary producer of newscasts, WBUP re-branded its newscasts to ABC 10 News Now. Lacking a weather department, WBUP outsourced its weather coverage to WJMN, with its meteorologists appearing on-air.

In December 2007, it began producing the area's first prime time newscast on WBKP. Known as CW 5 News Now, this thirty-minute program was seen weeknights at 10 p.m. In September 2012, WBUP began airing its first-ever weekday morning newscast, known as ABC 10 News Now This Morning, seen at 6:30 a.m. To cover the Keweenaw Peninsula, the station also operates an advertising sales office and news bureau on East Montezuma Avenue in Houghton (sharing a building with radio sister stations WOLV, WHKB, and WCCY).

On September 9, 2024, WBUP merged its news department with WJMN under the new branding My UP News. As part of the arrangement, WBUP expanded its morning newscast from a half-hour to two hours, and maintained 6 p.m. and 11 p.m. newscasts on weekdays.

== Technical information ==
=== Subchannels ===
The station's signal is multiplexed:

Subchannels of WBUP
Subchannel	Res.	Short name	Programming
10.1	720p	WBUPABC	ABC
10.2	720p	WBUP-CW	The CW Plus (WBKP)
10.3	720p	WJMN-MY	Independent with MyNetworkTV

Simulcast of subchannels of another station

Grade A signal contours for WJMN-TV, originating station WBUP, and associated simulcast.; WJMN 3 Escanaba MI; WBUP 10 Ishpeming MI; WBKP 5.2 Calumet MI

=== Analog-to-digital conversion ===
WBUP shut down its analog signal, over VHF channel 10, on June 12, 2009, and "flash-cut" its digital signal into operation on VHF channel 10. Since it was granted an original construction permit after the Federal Communications Commission (FCC) finalized the DTV allotment plan on April 21, 1997, this station did not receive a companion channel for a digital television station. It then began offering a standard definition simulcast of WBKP on a new second digital subchannel in order to expand that station's broadcasting radius.
