= Anchorwoman (TV series) =

American comedy/reality hybrid television series

- Genre: Comedy, Reality
- Created by: J. Brian Gadinsky
- Directed by: Mark S. Jacobs
- Starring: Lauren Jones
- Composer: Jon Ernst
- Country of origin: United States
- Original language: English
- No. of seasons: 1
- No. of episodes: 8 (6 unaired)

Production
- Executive producer: Brian Gadinsky
- Producer: Andy Neil
- Production companies: The G Group; Fox 21

Original release
- Network: Fox
- Release: August 22, 2007

Anchorwoman is a partially scripted American comedy/reality hybrid television series that aired on Fox in August 2007. The series was canceled after airing two back to back episodes due to low ratings.

== Synopsis ==
The series features Lauren Jones, a former model, "Barker Beauty" on The Price Is Right, Miss New York Pageant Winner, and featured WWE Diva, who aspires to become an anchorwoman at KYTX in Tyler, Texas.

The show debuted at 8 p.m. Eastern Time on Wednesday, August 22, 2007, with two back-to-back, half-hour episodes. It drew 2.72 million viewers and a 1.0 rating in the 18–49 age group, and the following morning the network announced the series was canceled.

Unaired episodes were available for viewing on the Fox website through Fox on Demand. However, by September 27, 2007, the network removed the show's site. Reruns of 'Til Death filled the void on FOX's schedule, while the remaining episodes never aired.

== Production notes ==
Produced by Fox 21, Inc. and the G Group, the show was created by Brian Gadinsky and executive produced by Gadinsky and Josh Bingham. Supervising producers and writers included Chad Damiani and JP Lavin. Anchorwoman was directed by Mark Jacobs, who also was credited as Director of Photography.

== Affiliations ==
Although Anchorwoman program aired on the Fox network, the station where the show originated, KYTX (at the time owned by Max Media), was a CBS affiliate. For this series, all references to CBS, including the "eye" logo, were removed during the taping of the program. The CBS eye and associated material were reinstated after the series was wrapped.

When the local Fox affiliate KFXK, owned by ComCorp, broadcast the show on its debut night, it sold no local spots during local breaks, and filled the time instead with promos from its other ComCorp station in the market, KETK-TV. (At the time the series aired, KFXK did not have its own newscast.)

== See also ==
- List of television series canceled after two episodes
