= Jeremy Ford =

Jeremy Ford may refer to:

- Jeremy J. Ford, film director and television writer
- Jeremy Ford (chef), American chef
