= KCEB =

Television station in Longview, Texas

- Longview–Tyler, Texas; United States
- City: Longview, Texas
- Channels: Digital: 35 (UHF), shared with KPKN-LD; Virtual: 54

Programming
- Affiliations: 54.1: Fubo Sports Network; 54.2: Outlaw; 54.3: Infomercials

Ownership
- Owner: Innovate Corp.; (HC2 Station Group, Inc.)
- Sister stations: KPKN-LD

History
- First air date: July 27, 2003
- Former channel numbers: Analog: 54 (UHF, 2003–2009); Digital: 51 (UHF, 2010–2015), 26 (UHF, 2015–2018), 28 (UHF, share with KTBS-TV, 2018–2020), 33 (UHF, 2020–2022); Virtual: 54 (2009–2018), 3.4 (2018–2020)
- Former affiliations: UPN (via KTPN-LP/KLPN-LP, 2003–January 2006); The WB (via WB+; January–September 2006); The CW (via CW+; September 2006–2012); MeTV (2012–2013); Cozi TV (2013–2015); SonLife (2015–2019); Infomercials (2019–2020, 2023); Azteca América (2020–2022); Novelisima (2023–2024); beIN Sports Xtra (2024–2025)

Technical information
- Licensing authority: FCC
- Facility ID: 83913
- ERP: 15 kW
- HAAT: 155.9 m (511 ft)
- Transmitter coordinates: 32°27′15.7″N 95°7′50.3″W

Links
- Public license information: Public file; LMS

KCEB (channel 54) is a television station in Longview, Texas, United States, affiliated with the Fubo Sports Network. The station is owned by Innovate Corp. alongside Tyler-licensed low-power station KPKN-LD, both of which share RF channel 35.

Although KCEB is licensed as a full-power station, it shares spectrum with KPKN-LD, whose low-power signal only covers the immediate Tyler–Longview area. Therefore, KCEB relies on cable and satellite carriage to reach the entire market.

== History ==
The station first signed on the air on July 27, 2003; operating as a UPN affiliate, it originally served as the full-power satellite of low-power stations KTPN-LP (channel 48) in Tyler and KLPN-LP (channel 58, later 47; now defunct) in Longview. The stations were collectively branded as "UPN 58/54/48". The station's original analog transmitter facilities were located northwest of Longview, at the intersection of State Highway 300 and FM1844, near the town of East Mountain.

On January 1, 2006, KCEB, KLPN-LP and KTPN-LP lost the UPN affiliation to CBS affiliate KYTX (channel 19), which carried the network on its second digital subchannel. The station immediately switched its affiliation to The WB, effectively replacing "KWTL", a cable-only WB outlet that was part of The WB 100+ Station Group, a service that was created in September 1998 to expand The WB's national coverage primarily through cable-only outlets in smaller markets, which were managed locally by cable providers (since it was cable-exclusive, the channel used the "KWTL" callsign in a fictional manner). During the transition, KTPN and KLPN became independent stations.

Former KCEB logo, used from 2008 to 2012.

Shortly after receiving the affiliation, on January 24, 2006, the Warner Bros. unit of Time Warner and CBS Corporation announced that the two companies would shut down The WB and UPN and combine the networks' respective programming to create a new "fifth" network called The CW, which would be aimed at young adults between the ages of 18 and 34.

One month later on February 22, the News Corporation announced the launch of a new network of its own called MyNetworkTV, which would be operated by Fox Television Stations and its syndication division Twentieth Television, which was created to give UPN and WB stations that did not strike affiliation agreements with The CW another option besides converting to independent stations. KCEB affiliated with The CW upon the network's launch on September 18, 2006 (affiliated with the network through The WB 100+ Station Group's successor The CW Plus), while KLPN and KTPN chose to join MyNetworkTV, which launched two weeks earlier on September 5.

In 2008, KCEB changed its on-air branding from "CW 54" to "CW 54/5", adding the station's cable channel assignment on Suddenlink Communications in the Tyler area. On November 6, 2009, the station was sold to the London Broadcasting Company, owner of KYTX. London initially operated the station under a sales and management agreement prior to the Federal Communications Commission giving approval for London to acquire the license assets. The sale was finalized on August 31, 2010. KCEB swapped affiliations with KYTX in May 2012, taking that subchannel's MeTV affiliation, while KYTX's second digital subchannel began carrying programming from The CW Plus.

On May 14, 2014, the Gannett Company announced that it would acquire KYTX and five other London Broadcasting stations in a $215 million all-cash transaction. Gannett's CEO Gracia Martore touted that the acquisition would give the company a presence in several fast-growing markets, and opportunities for local advertisers to leverage its digital marketing platform. London exempted KCEB from the deal (as well as company flagship KTXD-TV in the Dallas suburb of Greenville), which will result in only the second instance in which a duopoly will be legally and operationally separated (the Sinclair Broadcast Group is similarly splitting up its Birmingham duopoly of WTTO and WABM, to acquire WBMA-LD and its satellites as part of its purchase of Allbritton Communications).

On March 28, 2018, it was announced that KCEB had entered into a channel-sharing agreement with Shreveport-based ABC affiliate KTBS-TV. KCEB had previously agreed to go off the air after selling its spectrum in the 2017 broadcast incentive auction. KCEB began broadcasting on KTBS' frequency on April 29, 2018. The station did not have to change its city of license, as KTBS' signal completely covers Longview.

=== KPKN-LD ===
The Federal Communications Commission granted the construction permit for the station, as K33KN-D, on February 25, 2010. The station's call letters were changed to the current KPKN-LD on March 29, 2016. The station signed on in April 2016 as an affiliate of FremantleMedia's Buzzr network. Buzzr was previously on KDKJ-LD4 until that point. Katz Broadcasting's male-oriented Grit replaced Buzzr on KDKJ-LD4 upon KPKN's sign on.

On March 10, 2023, following the announcement of Scripps to combine the True Real and Defy TV networks in to one, KPKN-LD DT2 switched to Ion Television, becoming the area's second affiliate, alongside KETK-TV DT3.

== Programming ==
KCEB was one of a handful of MeTV affiliates that preempted portions of the network's schedule (many of the network's affiliates carry at least the majority of the schedule, with any preemptions usually limited to local newscasts produced for the subchannel/station or any network programming that a co-owned major network affiliate chooses to shift to the subchannel to air live due to breaking news or severe weather coverage). The station preempted much of the network's Sunday morning schedule (which consists primarily of either a secondary block of E/I programming or classic television series depending on the market) with televised church services and paid programming. KCEB also carried a rebroadcast of sister station KYTX's morning newscast, preempting classic television programs aired by MeTV from 7 to 9 a.m. weekdays.

Beginning with the 2012 football season, KCEB carried Southland Conference college football and basketball games from the Southland Conference Television Network, which included game telecasts from nearby Nacogdoches-based Stephen F. Austin State University. Southland Conference sports coverage was discontinued with the transition to the Azteca América network affiliation. With the discontinuance of the Azteca América programming on December 31, 2022, KCEB switched programming to "Timeless TV", an offering of infomercials mixed with older episodes of public domain programs such as The Beverly Hillbillies, The Adventures of Ozzie and Harriet, Bonanza, and The Lucy Show. Timeless TV would then be replaced with Novelisima, a network of telenovelas (or soap operas), returning KCEB to Spanish language programming, on January 13, 2023. This, too, would be a short lived programming change for KCEB, as just one week later, Novelisima programming would be dropped from the station as it flipped to another infomercial based network operated over many HC2 Holdings stations, Magnificent Movies Network. MMN programming is similar to Timeless TV, featuring infomercials, combined instead with old movie titles which are readily available in the public domain, as opposed to sitcoms.

On May 16, 2023, HC2 Holdings moved the Magnificent Movies Network to the relaunched KCEB-DT2, and returned the Novelisima Network to the primary station.

In early March 2024, Novelisima programming was discontinued from the main KCEB signal replaced by beIN Sports Xtra Español.

== Technical information ==
=== Subchannels ===
Subchannels of KPKN-LD and KCEB
License	Channel	Res.	Short name	Programming
KPKN-LD	33.1	480i	KPKN-LD	Buzzr
KPKN-LD	33.2	480i	KPKN-LD	Defy
KPKN-LD	33.3	480i	KPKN-LD	MovieSphere Gold
KPKN-LD	33.4	480i	KPKN-LD	Infomercials (4:3)
KPKN-LD	33.5	480i	KPKN-LD	Infomercials (4:3)
KPKN-LD	33.6	480i	KPKN-LD	Infomercials (4:3)
KPKN-LD	33.7	480i	KPKN-LD	Jewelry TV
KCEB	54.1	720p	KCEB	Fubo Sports Network
KCEB	54.2	480i	KCEB	Outlaw
KCEB	54.3	480i	KCEB	Infomercials

=== Analog-to-digital conversion ===
Because it was granted an original construction permit after the FCC finalized the digital television allotment plan on April 21, 1997, the station did not originally receive a companion channel for a digital television signal. In May 2007, the station was granted a construction permit by the FCC to construct a digital transmitter facility to broadcast a signal on UHF channel 38, and move its transmitter to the KFXK-TV tower near New London. In May 2008, they submitted an application to the FCC to move their digital allotment from channel 38 to channel 51, to use the antenna used by KFXK that would be effectively abandoned by that station when it terminated its analog signal upon the digital television transition. In January 2009, the application was approved, and a modification of the construction permit was granted for channel 51 at 1000 kW.

On June 12, 2009, KCEB shut down its analog signal on channel 54, while KFXK ceased its analog signal on channel 51. KCEB then flash-cut its digital signal into operation on UHF channel 51 from the New London tower on a temporary 70 kW transmitter under special temporary authority from the FCC. At that point, KCEB was under severe financial hardship and could not afford to build the digital signal out to its maximum authorization. On December 12, 2009, KCEB was issued a construction permit to install a 500 kW transmitter.
