= CW 54 =

CW 54 may refer to the following television stations in the U.S. affiliated with the CW:

== Current ==
- KNVA in Austin, Texas
- WNUV in Baltimore, Maryland

== Former ==
- KCEB in Longview, Texas (2006–2012)
