= ABC 9 (American Broadcasting Company affiliates) =

ABC 9 may refer to:

== Current affiliates ==
- KCAU-TV in Sioux City, Iowa
- KCRG-TV in Cedar Rapids, Iowa
- KECY-DT2 in El Centro, California–Yuma, Arizona
- KEZI in Eugene, Oregon
- KGUN-TV in Tucson, Arizona
- KMBC-TV in Kansas City, Missouri
- KTRE in Lufkin, Texas
  - Semi-satellite of KLTV in Tyler, Texas
- WAOW in Wausau, Wisconsin
- WCPO-TV in Cincinnati, Ohio
- WFTV in Orlando, Florida
- WMUR-TV in Manchester, New Hampshire
- WSOC-TV in Charlotte, North Carolina
- WSYR-TV in Syracuse, New York
- WTVA-DT2 in Tupelo, Mississippi
- WTVC in Chattanooga, Tennessee
- WTVM in Columbus, Georgia

== Formerly affiliated ==
- KABY-TV in Aberdeen, South Dakota (1983–2017)
- KMSP-TV in Minneapolis–Saint Paul, Minnesota (1961–1979)
- KUSA (TV) in Denver, Colorado (1953–1995)
- KVKM-TV/KMOM-TV in Odessa–Midland, Texas (1958–1981)
