= ABC 9 =

ABC 9 may refer to:

- ABC-9, the Australian Broadcasting Corporation TV station in Canberra, Australia
- ABC 9 (American Broadcasting Company affiliates)
