= Church of the Lukumi Babalu Aye v. City of Hialeah =

- Supreme Court of the United States

Argued November 4, 1992 Decided June 11, 1993
- Full case name: Church of the Lukumi Babalu Aye, Inc. and Ernesto Pichardo v. City of Hialeah
- Citations: 508 U.S. 520 (more) 113 S. Ct. 2217; 124 L. Ed. 2d 472
- Argument: Oral argument

Case history
- Prior: Dismissing individuals, 688 F.Supp. 1522 (S.D. Fla. 1988). Summary judgment for defendant, 723 F. Supp. 1467 (S.D. Fla. 1989). Aff'd, 936 F.2d 586 (11th Cir. 1991). Cert granted, 503 U.S. 935 (1992).

Holding
- The states cannot restrict religiously-mandated ritual slaughter of animals, regardless of the purpose of the slaughter.

Court membership
- Chief Justice William Rehnquist Associate Justices Byron White · Harry Blackmun; John P. Stevens · Sandra Day O'Connor; Antonin Scalia · Anthony Kennedy; David Souter · Clarence Thomas

Case opinion
- Majority: Kennedy, joined by Rehnquist, Stevens, Scalia, and Thomas (parts I, II-A-1, II-A-3, II-B, III, IV); White (parts I, II-B, III, IV); Souter (parts I, III, IV).
- Plurality: Kennedy (Part II-A-2), joined by Stevens
- Concurrence: Scalia (in part and judgment), joined by Rehnquist
- Concurrence: Souter (in part and judgment)
- Concurrence: Blackmun (in judgment), joined by O'Connor

Laws applied
- U.S. Const. amend. I City of Hialeah Ordinances 87-52, 87-71, 87-72

Church of the Lukumi Babalu Aye, Inc. v. City of Hialeah, 508 U.S. 520 (1993), was a case in which the Supreme Court of the United States held that an ordinance passed in Hialeah, Florida, forbidding the unnecessary killing of "an animal in a public or private ritual or ceremony not for the primary purpose of food consumption", was unconstitutional.

== Background ==
Santería is an Afro-Cuban religion developed as a syncretism of Roman Catholicism and Yoruba religion by Yoruba people brought as slaves from Yorubaland to Cuba by the Atlantic slave trade. Adherents can fulfill their destiny through the aid of beings known as orishas, who subsist off blood from animal sacrifice. Animals, usually chickens, killed during ritual slaughter are then cooked and eaten by the celebrants, except during death and healing rituals, where sick energy is believed to have passed into the sacrifice. Santeria has been subject to widespread persecution in Cuba, so it is traditionally practiced in secret, employing saint symbolism.

The Church of Lukumi Babalu Aye, Inc., is a Florida nonprofit organized in 1973 by Ernesto Pichardo, who was an Italero-level priest in the Santeria faith. The Lucumí language is used in the Santeria liturgy and Babalú-Ayé is the spirit of wrath and disease. In April 1987, the Church leased a property at 173 W. 5th Street, Hialeah, in Miami-Dade County, Florida and announced its intention to use the site to openly practice the faith.

The Hialeah City Council held an emergency public session on June 9, 1987. At the session, Councilman Silvio Cardoso stated that the religion is "in violation of everything this country stands for"; Councilman Andres Mejides observed that the Bible does not allow this particular type of animal sacrifice; and Councilman Julio Martinez noted (to audience applause) that in Cuba "people were put in jail for practicing this religion." Hialeah's police chaplain testified that the Church worshipped "demons" and the city attorney testified that "this community will not tolerate religious practices abhorrent to its citizens." Pichardo's brief testimony was met with taunts from the audience.

At the end of the session the city council passed a resolution announcing its commitment to prohibit "all religious groups which are inconsistent with public morals, peace or safety”. The city further passed a resolution incorporating Florida's animal cruelty statute into the city code and the city attorney obtained a Florida Attorney General's Opinion from Bob Butterworth concluding that the state statute did not permit ritual animal sacrifice.

In September 1987, the city council unanimously passed three new ordinances that criminalized “sacrifices of animals for any type of ritual, regardless of whether or not the flesh or blood of the animal is to be consumed.” The city council exempted kosher slaughterhouses, regular slaughterhouses, hunting, fishing, pest extermination, euthanasia of stray animals, and feeding live rabbits to greyhounds.

The Church sued in the United States District Court for the Southern District of Florida. On June 10, 1988, U.S. District Judge Eugene P. Spellman granted absolute immunity to the individual city council members and the mayor in a summary judgment. On October 5, 1989, after a nine-day bench trial on the remaining claims, Judge Spellman ruled in favor of the city. In 1991, the United States Court of Appeals for the Eleventh Circuit affirmed in an unsigned one-paragraph per curiam decision, where it noted that Judge Spellman "employed an arguably stricter standard" than that applied in Employment Division v. Smith (1990), which had in the interim found Native Americans could be fired for their ritual use of peyote. In Smith, Justice Antonin Scalia had even cited Judge Spellman's opinion as authority, which the city highlighted in their appeals brief.

The Court in Wisconsin v. Yoder (1972) had explicitly provided Amish parents a religious exemption from mandatory school attendance under the Free Exercise Clause. However, in the years since, free-exercise claimants had lost every case before the Court, with the exception of a line of employment decisions cases terminated by Smith. The Church's petition for certiorari from the Supreme Court of the United States was granted, with Douglas Laycock appearing for the Church during oral arguments on November 4, 1992.

== Supreme Court ==
=== Opinion of the Court ===
On June 11, 1993, the Supreme Court unanimously reversed the appeals court's decision. Justice Anthony Kennedy, in an Opinion of the Court joined in parts by Chief Justice William Rehnquist, and Justices Byron White, John Paul Stevens, Antonin Scalia, David Souter, and Clarence Thomas concluded that the city's ordinances violated the Free Exercise Clause of the United States Constitution.

Kennedy read the Smith decision as requiring a compelling governmental interest if a law is not of neutral and general applicability. Kennedy went on, in a section Souter and White refused to join, to conclude that although the ordinances were facially neutral, they were religiously "gerrymandered with care" to only apply to religious killings. Kennedy, in a section only joined by Stevens, detailed the ordinances' legislative history, even citing taped excerpts of the Hialeah City Council Meeting. Next, in a section Souter refused to join, Kennedy noted the numerous exemptions in the Florida statute, concluding the law is not generally applicable because it effectively applies "only against conduct motivated by religious belief." Finally, in a section joined by the full seven justice majority, Kennedy applied strict scrutiny, which the city ordinances fail.

Because the ordinance suppressed more religious conduct than was necessary to achieve its stated ends, it was deemed unconstitutional, with Justice Anthony Kennedy stating in the decision, "religious beliefs need not be acceptable, logical, consistent or comprehensible to others in order to merit First Amendment protection". In sum the Court concluded:

We conclude, in sum, that each of Hialeah's ordinances pursues the city's governmental interests only against conduct motivated by religious belief. The ordinances "ha[ve] every appearance of a prohibition that society is prepared to impose upon [Santeria worshippers] but not upon itself." Florida Star v. B. J. F., 491 U. S. 524, 542 (1989) (SCALIA, J., concurring in part and concurring in judgment). This precise evil is what the requirement of general applicability is designed to prevent.

III

A law burdening religious practice that is not neutral or not of general application must undergo the most rigorous of scrutiny. To satisfy the commands of the First Amendment, a law restrictive of religious practice must advance" 'interests of the highest order'" and must be narrowly tailored in pursuit of those interests. McDaniel v. Paty, 435 U. S., at 628, quoting Wisconsin v. Yoder, 406 U. S. 205, 215 (1972). The compelling interest standard that we apply once a law fails to meet the Smith requirements is not "water[ed] ... down" but "really means what it says." Employment Div., Dept. of Human Resources of Ore. v. Smith, 494 U. S., at 888. A law that targets religious conduct for distinctive treatment or advances legitimate governmental interests only against conduct with a religious motivation will survive strict scrutiny only in rare cases. It follows from what we have already said that these ordinances cannot withstand this scrutiny.

First, even were the governmental interests compelling, the ordinances are not drawn in narrow terms to accomplish those interests. As we have discussed, see supra, at 538540, 543-546, all four ordinances are overbroad or underinclusive in substantial respects. The proffered objectives are not pursued with respect to analogous nonreligious conduct, and those interests could be achieved by narrower ordinances that burdened religion to a far lesser degree. The absence of narrow tailoring suffices to establish the invalidity of the ordinances. See Arkansas Writers' Project, Inc.

Respondent has not demonstrated, moreover, that, in the context of these ordinances, its governmental interests are compelling. Where government restricts only conduct protected by the First Amendment and fails to enact feasible measures to restrict other conduct producing substantial harm or alleged harm of the same sort, the interest given in justification of the restriction is not compelling. It is established in our strict scrutiny jurisprudence that "a law cannot be regarded as protecting an interest 'of the highest order' ... when it leaves appreciable damage to that supposedly vital interest unprohibited." Florida Star v. B. J. F., supra, at 541-542 (SCALIA, J., concurring in part and concurring in judgment) (citation omitted). See Simon & Schuster, Inc. v. Members of N. Y. State Crime Victims Bd., 502 U. S. 105, 119-120 (1991). Cf. Florida Star v. B. J. F., supra, at 540541; Smith v. Daily Mail Publishing Co., 443 U. S. 97, 104105 (1979); id., at 110 (REHNQUIST, J., concurring in judgment). As we show above, see supra, at 543-546, the ordinances are underinclusive to a substantial extent with respect to each of the interests that respondent has asserted, and it is only conduct motivated by religious conviction that bears the weight of the governmental restrictions. There can be no serious claim that those interests justify the ordinances.

IV

The Free Exercise Clause commits government itself to religious tolerance, and upon even slight suspicion that proposals for state intervention stem from animosity to religion or distrust of its practices, all officials must pause to remember their own high duty to the Constitution and to the rights it secures. Those in office must be resolute in resisting importunate demands and must ensure that the sole reasons for imposing the burdens of law and regulation are secular. Legislators may not devise mechanisms, overt or disguised, designed to persecute or oppress a religion or its practices. The laws here in question were enacted contrary to these constitutional principles, and they are void."

=== Scalia's concurrence in part ===
Justice Scalia joined by Chief Justice Rehnquist, defended the Smith decision and attacked the use of legislative intent, opining that there would be no constitutional violation if "the Hialeah City Council set out resolutely to suppress the practices of Santeria, but ineptly adopted ordinances that failed to do so".

=== Souter's concurrence in part ===
Justice Souter, writing alone for eighteen pages, noted that "The Smith rule, in my view, may be reexamined consistently with principles of stare decisis."

=== Blackmun's concurrence in the judgment ===
Justice Harry Blackmun, joined by Justice Sandra Day O'Connor, concurred in the judgment only. Refusing to endorse the approach used in the majority opinion, Blackmun wrote, "I continue to believe that Smith was wrongly decided". Blackmun goes on, citing an amicus curiae brief by People for the Ethical Treatment of Animals, to observe that had this case presented "a law that sincerely pursued the goal of protecting animals from cruel treatment", the result may have been different.

== Subsequent developments ==
Somewhat similarly in 2009, a freedom of religion case related to animal sacrifice was taken to the U.S. Court of Appeals for the Fifth Circuit in the case of Merced v. Kasson. Merced was a Santeria priest and the president of Templo Yoruba Omo Orisha Texas, Inc., a Santeria religious group. He challenged Euless, Texas city ordinances prohibiting the slaughter of four-legged animals. The court ruled that the ordinances "substantially burden plaintiff's free exercise of religion without advancing a compelling governmental interest using the least restrictive means" and that Merced was entitled under the Texas Religious Freedom Restoration Act (TRFRA) to an injunction preventing the city from enforcing its ordinances that burdened his religious practices relating to the use of animals. The court did not reach Merced's claims under the First and Fourteenth Amendments.

== See also ==
- List of United States Supreme Court cases, volume 508
- List of United States Supreme Court cases
- Lists of United States Supreme Court cases by volume
- List of United States Supreme Court cases by the Rehnquist Court
