= Clara McLaughlin =

American newspaper publisher (1939–2021)

- Clara McLaughlin, owner and publisher of The Florida Star and The Georgia Star
- Born: Clara Jackson McLaughlin; October 22, 1939; Brunswick, Georgia
- Died: October 3, 2021 (aged 81); Houston, Texas
- Occupations: Author; Journalist; Television station owner; Publisher
- Known for: First African American female in the US to become founder, major owner and CEO of a network affiliated television station.

Clara McLaughlin (October 22, 1939 – October 3, 2021) was an author, owner and publisher of The Florida Star and The Georgia Star. She was the first African American female in the US to become founder, major owner and CEO of a network-affiliated television station.

== Early life, education, and academic career ==
Clara McLaughlin was born in Brunswick, Georgia and grew up in Gainesville, Florida. She started her career in journalism while in high school by writing, producing, and distributing the school's only student newsletter.

After graduating from high school, Clara attended Hampton Institute, Hampton, Virginia, where she majored in music. She left Hampton and joined the U. S. Navy WAVES, and worked as a yeoman and organist for the Navy Chapel. After receiving her honorable discharge, Clara was able to use her GI Bill to help pay for the rest of her education.

When Clara reached Howard University in Washington, D. C., she discovered that the University did not offer journalism as a major, and for this reason initiated steps for students to major in journalism. Clara was, therefore, able to graduate with honors from Howard University as a journalism major and was also one of the founders of the National Black Communications Society.

Clara served as co-editor-in-chief (1971 Bison) her first time to ever work on a yearbook and Editor-in-Chief her second year (1972 Bison). With her leadership and skills, Howard University became the first HBCU to win the All American Award for a student publication. Clara also worked as Editorial Assistant for the Journal of the National Medical Association under Dr. W. Montague Cobb and wrote the first book for black parents on child care, The Black Parents Handbook: A Guide to Healthy Pregnancy, Birth, and Child Care. Following her undergraduate studies, Clara became a member of Zeta Phi Beta sorority

=== Television station owner ===
In 1979 Clara felt that television was not giving women and minorities the proper recognition but felt working at a station would not give the authority to change such. She filed a petition with the Federal Communications Commission who subsequently approved a television allocation to be dropped into Houston (Channel 57), designed to show women and minorities in a more positive manner. While waiting for the petition to be approved, she applied for, built, and was able to get on the air, a CBS-affiliated television station in Longview, Texas, KLMG, making her the first African American female in the U. S. to become founder, major owner, and CEO of a network-affiliated television station.

=== Newspaper owner/publisher ===
From 2002 until her death, Clara was owner and publisher of the oldest African American owned newspaper in Northeast Florida, The Florida Star. She added a new publication, The Georgia Star in 2005. Clara also served as host for a weekly radio talk show, IMPACT, on WCGL-AM and was a media participant on Jacksonville's PBS television affiliate, "Week in Review" for many years as well as two other FM stations in Jacksonville. She was a weekly host on childcare on Houston's PBS-affiliate, KUHT.

== Awards and recognition ==
Clara has received many honors and awards, and was recognized for her media trailblazer achievements in Washington, D.C., in 2012 at the national communications organization, MMTC. She also received the Distinguished Alumni Award from Howard University, was inducted into the first Lincoln High School (Gainesville, Florida) Hall of Fame, the Kool Achievers Award, SCLC's national Drum Major for Justice Award in Atlanta and Female Entrepreneur of the year award for the U.S. which was held in Atlanta, Georgia. The City of Houston, Texas honored her twice with a Clara McLaughlin Day. Clara McLaughlin has been featured in many major publications, including The Wall Street Journal, USA Today, The New York Times, Los Angeles Times, The Houston Chronicle, The Houston Post, The Dallas Morning News, Dallas Times Herald, Ebony, Jet, Texas Women Magazine, and many more, as well as featured in the book, Texas Women in History. She was also featured in an episode of Lifestyles of the Rich and Famous. Since returning to Florida, she has received many other honors and awards including, MADDADS Award and the Jacksonville and Florida's Onyx's awards in Communications. The Florida Star, under her leadership, was recognized by the Jacksonville City Council for its reach to the community. The Jacksonville Sheriff's Office also honored Clara and The Florida Star with their first Eagle Award for being Jacksonville's ‘most factual’ medium. In 2011, Clara received the Diversity Award from the Jacksonville Business Journal, honored by Jacksonville's Urban League and received the ‘Key to the city of Jacksonville’ as well as a proclamation from the city in 2015 under Mayor Alvin Brown.

== Works ==
- — (31 May 1976). The Black Parents Handbook: A Guide to Healthy Pregnancy, Birth, and Child Care. In collaboration with Donald R. Frisby, M.D., Richard A. McLaughlin, M.D., and Melvin W. Williams, M.D. Harcourt Brace Jovanovich. ISBN 978-0156131001. LCCN 75043986. OCLC 993317573.

== See also ==
- Minority ownership of media outlets in the United States
