= KYTX =

Television station in Nacogdoches, Texas

- Nacogdoches–Lufkin–; Tyler–Longview–Jacksonville, Texas; United States
- City: Nacogdoches, Texas
- Channels: Digital: 15 (UHF); Virtual: 19
- Branding: CBS 19; CBS 19 News; East Texas CW 19.2

Programming
- Affiliations: 19.1: CBS; 19.2: CW+; for others, see § Subchannels

Ownership
- Owner: Tegna Inc., a subsidiary of Nexstar Media Group; (LSB Broadcasting, Inc.)
- Sister stations: Nexstar: KETK-TV, KTPN-LD, KFXK-TV

History
- First air date: September 1, 1991
- Former call signs: KLSB-TV (1991–2004)
- Former channel numbers: Analog: 19 (UHF, 1991–2009); Digital: 18 (UHF, 2001–2019)
- Former affiliations: NBC (1991–2004; as satellite of KETK-TV)

Technical information
- Licensing authority: FCC
- Facility ID: 55644
- ERP: 873 kW
- HAAT: 455 m (1,493 ft)
- Transmitter coordinates: 31°54′21″N 95°5′6″W

Links
- Public license information: Public file; LMS
- Website: www.cbs19.tv

KYTX (channel 19) is a television station licensed to Nacogdoches, Texas, United States, serving East Texas as an affiliate of CBS and The CW Plus. It is owned by the Tegna subsidiary of Nexstar Media Group; Nexstar also owns KETK-TV (channel 56), an NBC affiliate, and KTPN-LD (channel 36), an independent station with MyNetworkTV, and operates Fox affiliate KFXK-TV (channel 51). KYTX's studios are located near Loop 323 in the southeastern portion of Tyler, and its transmitter is located near State Highway 110 in rural east-central Cherokee County (northwest of Ponta).

KYTX began broadcasting as KLSB-TV in 1991. It rebroadcast KETK-TV, initially with local news inserts for the Nacogdoches area. In 2003, it was sold to Max Media, former owners of KETK, and relaunched on a separate basis as the first in-market CBS affiliate for East Texas in 13 years. This included the move of the station's transmitter further north and the launch of a local news department. The station was the setting of the Fox network's shortlived series Anchorwoman in 2007, in part as a promotion gambit for the new station's local newscasts. It was sold in 2007 to London Broadcasting and in 2014 to Gannett, which split its broadcasting assets as Tegna Inc. the next year. In 2026, Nexstar acquired Tegna.

== CBS in East Texas ==
The CBS network had bounced from affiliate to affiliate in the market over its history.

CBS's first local affiliate was KETX, a station on channel 19 in Tyler which began airing CBS programming in January 1954. However, the station left the air on October 23 of that year. Between 1969 and 1970, CBS was affiliated with KAEC-TV, also on channel 19 but in Nacogdoches. This station, owned by the Fredonia Broadcasting Corporation, left the air after eight months amid major technical issues; it ultimately won damages against manufacturer RCA three separate times after suing over equipment it believed defective. KLTV, the only full-service station in Tyler after KETX folded, continued to air select CBS programs, most notably NFL football. In September 1984, Longview-based KLMG-TV began broadcasting on channel 51 as the CBS affiliate for the area. However, the station disaffiliated from the network in April 1991 to become the market's Fox affiliate as KFXK-TV.

Cable television systems in the market generally carried KSLA from Shreveport, Louisiana, whose signal covered the Longview area, or KDFW-TV from Dallas in their lineups. KDFW was introduced to Longview in the late 1970s, first on a temporary basis after KSLA's tower collapsed in 1977 and then permanently beginning in December 1978. In September 1990, these stations each had higher ratings in East Texas than KLMG. In 1995, an affiliation switch in the Dallas–Fort Worth market saw KTVT of Fort Worth, previously an independent station, replace KDFW-TV as the CBS affiliate.

== History ==
=== Establishment as KLSB ===
On September 1, 1991, local NBC affiliate KETK-TV (channel 56) launched KLSB-TV as a satellite station for the Nacogdoches area. It had its own studios in Nacogdoches, employing 40 people and producing separate evening newscasts. In January 1994, separate Nacogdoches newscasts were discontinued, resulting in a net loss of about nine jobs with a continuing presence there.

=== Launch of KYTX ===
Max Media (a successor in name only to a previous company known as Max Media, which had owned KETK-TV in the late 1990s) acquired KLSB from KLSB Television LLC, a company which had leased its air time to KETK-TV, in 2003. It announced it would move its transmitter to cover Tyler and Longview and become the region's first CBS affiliate in more than a decade. Max Media hired Phil Hurley, who had run KETK-TV from 1986 to 1987 and KLTV from 1983 to 1986, to establish the new outlet.

On April 12, 2004, channel 19 relaunched with its new CBS programming. It became KYTX the next day. The new local affiliate immediately displaced KTVT and KSLA on many of the region's cable systems; however, it continued to air some of KTVT's newscasts until it could establish its own local news operation from studios in Tyler. The station switched from the KLSB-TV transmitter facility to a new plant in Cherokee County on June 21, giving it more efficient coverage in the Tyler–Longview market; it also began broadcasting a digital signal for the first time.

The station began producing local newscasts, known as Eyewitness News, on September 12, 2004. A 5 p.m. newscast launched in 2005, followed by a 6:30 p.m. newscast in 2006; the latter program focused on stories from the Longview portion of the market. The station found itself slightly trailing KETK in the ratings with 9,000 viewers to KETK's 12,000, though both stations struggled against KLTV, which commanded 70,000 viewers in the 10 p.m. time slot.

KYTX acquired the UPN affiliation for the Tyler–Longview market, which it added to a digital subchannel on January 1, 2006. However, when UPN merged with The WB to form The CW that September, KCEB (channel 54) was selected as the original affiliate.

=== Anchorwoman reality show ===
KYTX was the center of a reality series on Fox titled Anchorwoman, which filmed at the station's Tyler studios during the spring of 2007. The series starred Lauren Jones, a former beauty pageant winner, The Price Is Right model, and featured WWE Diva who trained to become an anchor at the station. KYTX was selected from some 100 stations across the U.S. to be the setting for the program; Hurley was interested because he wanted to attract local viewers' attention to his station's newscasts. However, the show was controversial. The news director of KLTV told Good Morning America that KYTX had sold its credibility, while others feared the show would negatively portray East Texas. Ultimately, the program aired two episodes on its premiere and was canceled the following day due to poor ratings.

=== London, Gannett/Tegna and Nexstar ownership ===
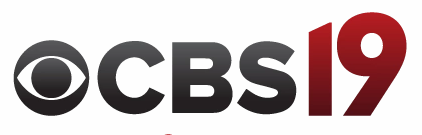
KYTX logo used from December 2015 to September 2018. A later version incorporated an umbrella.

On October 18, 2007, the station was sold to the Addison-based London Broadcasting Company (owned by former Gaylord Entertainment Company CEO Terry E. London, in association with private equity firm Sun TX Capital Partners) for $25 million.

2009 saw changes in transmission and news production. KYTX shut down its analog signal on February 17, the original target date on which full-power television stations in the United States were to transition from analog to digital broadcasts under federal mandate (which was pushed back to June 12, 2009). The station's digital signal remained on its pre-transition UHF channel 18, using virtual channel 19. In April, the station became the first in the Tyler–Longview market to begin broadcasting its local newscasts in high definition. At the time, the station produced 19 1/2 hours of newscasts a week. That December, London Broadcasting agreed to acquire KCEB; the FCC approved the deal under a failing station waiver in 2010, citing that station's deteriorated financial condition. (Note: The FCC can issue a failing station waiver allowing for the creation of a duopoly in markets otherwise too small to permit one legally (as is the case in Tyler–Longview), or involving two stations rated in the top four, under certain circumstances relating to lack of other suitable buyers; low ratings; three years of negative cash flow; and public interest benefit of the merger.)

The Gannett Company acquired six London stations, including KYTX, in a $215 million all-cash transaction in 2014; the move came a year after Gannett acquired the Belo Corporation, which also owned a series of network affiliates in larger Texas markets. In 2015, Gannett split into two companies: Gannett in publishing and Tegna Inc. in broadcast and digital media.

Nexstar Media Group, owner of KETK-TV and operator of KFXK-TV, acquired Tegna in a deal announced in August 2025 and completed on March 19, 2026. A temporary restraining order issued one week later by the U.S. District Court for the Eastern District of California, later escalated to a preliminary injunction, has prevented Nexstar from integrating the stations.

== Subchannels ==
KYTX's transmitter is located near State Highway 110 in rural east-central Cherokee County (northwest of Ponta). The station's signal is multiplexed:

Subchannels of KYTX
Subchannel	Res.	Short name	Programming
19.1	1080i	KYTX-DT	CBS
19.2	480i	MYTX	The CW Plus
19.3	720p	MeTV	MeTV/Dallas Mavericks
19.4	480i	Crimes	True Crime Network
19.5	480i	Court	Court TV
19.6	480i	ION +	Ion Plus
19.7	480i	NEST	The Nest
19.8	480i	Quest	Quest
