= KTPN-LD =

Television station in Tyler, Texas

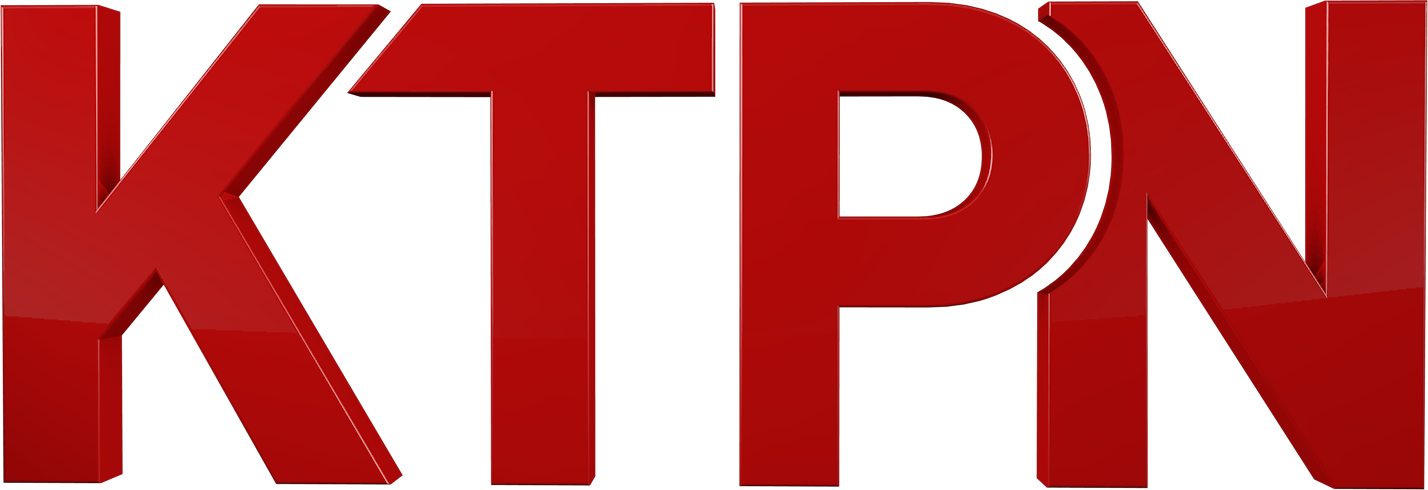
- Tyler, Texas; United States
- Channels: Digital: 36 (UHF); Virtual: 36
- Branding: KTPN

Programming
- Affiliations: 36.1: Independent with MyNetworkTV

Ownership
- Owner: Nexstar Media Group; (Nexstar Media Inc.)
- Sister stations: KFXK-TV, KETK-TV; Tegna: KYTX

History
- First air date: March 5, 1990
- Former call signs: K48DP (1990–1997); KTPN-LP (1997–2012)
- Former channel numbers: Analog: 48 (UHF, 1990–2010); Digital: 48 (UHF, 2010–2020)
- Former affiliations: Independent (1990–1995, January–September 2006); The WB (1995–1997); UPN (1997–January 2006)
- Call sign meaning: Tyler United Paramount Network (in reference to station's former UPN affiliation)

Technical information
- Licensing authority: FCC
- Facility ID: 8098
- Class: LD
- ERP: 15 kW
- HAAT: 114.5 m (376 ft)
- Transmitter coordinates: 32°21′52.1″N 95°16′20.5″W
- Translator(s): KFXK-TV 51.2 Longview

Links
- Public license information: LMS
- Website: www.ketk.com/ktpn/

Former translator
- KLPN-LD
- Longview, Texas
- Channels: Digital: 47 (UHF); Virtual: 47

Programming
- Affiliations: The WB (1995–1997); UPN (1997–January 2006); Independent (January–September 2006); MyNetworkTV (September 2006–2016)

Ownership
- Owner: White Knight Broadcasting; (Warwick Communications, Inc.)
- Operator: Nexstar Media Group via SSA

History
- First air date: 1995
- Last air date: June 6, 2016
- Former call signs: K22EH (1993–1998); K58FS (1998–2000); KLPN-LP (2000–2012)
- Former channel numbers: Analog: 22 (UHF, 1995–1998), 58 (UHF, 1998–2012)
- Call sign meaning: Longview Paramount Network (in reference to station's former UPN affiliation)

Technical information
- Facility ID: 8097
- Class: LD
- ERP: 0.7 kW
- HAAT: 311.5 m (1,022 ft)
- Transmitter coordinates: 32°36′4″N 94°52′15″W

Links
- Public license information: LMS

KTPN-LD (channel 36) is a low-power television station licensed to Tyler, Texas, United States. It is programmed primarily as an independent station, but maintains a secondary affiliation with MyNetworkTV. KTPN-LD is owned by Nexstar Media Group alongside NBC affiliate KETK-TV (channel 56) and co-managed with Fox affiliate KFXK-TV (channel 51); Nexstar's Tegna subsidiary owns CBS affiliate KYTX (channel 19). KTPN-LD, KETK-TV and KFXK-TV share studios on Richmond Road (near Loop 323) in Tyler; KTPN-LD's transmitter is located west of Texas Loop 323 northeast of the city.

KTPN-LD's signal was formerly relayed on KLPN-LD (channel 47) in Longview, which provided KTPN-LD's programming to the central and eastern portions of the market; that station's transmitter was located near East Mountain, Texas. KLPN-LD's license was canceled on June 6, 2016.

Due to KTPN-LD's low power status, its broadcasting radius only covers the immediate Tyler area. Therefore, in order to reach the entire market, the station is simulcast in high definition on KFXK's second digital subchannel (51.2) from a transmitter near FM 125 in rural northwestern Rusk County (northwest of New London).

== History ==
KTPN-LP first signed on the air from Tyler in 1990 as K48DP; originally operating as an independent station, it later became a charter affiliate of The WB when the network launched on January 11, 1995. KLPN-LP signed on in Longview as K22EH later that year, serving as a repeater of K48DP and also carrying WB network programming. In 1997, the two stations both dropped their WB affiliations to join the United Paramount Network (UPN); they were collectively branded as "UPN 22/48". Accordingly, channel 48 changed its callsign to KTPN-LP (standing for "Tyler Paramount Network"). In 1998, K22EH moved to UHF channel 58 and changed its callsign to K58FS in order to allow KETK-TV (channel 56) to sign on its digital signal on UHF channel 22 (K58FS and KTPN-LP were accordingly rebranded as "UPN 58/48"); two years later in 2000, K58FS changed its callsign to KLPN-LP (standing for "Longview Paramount Network") to match its sister station.

KTPN and KLPN received a full-power satellite when KCEB (channel 54, now a Fubo Sports Network affiliate) signed on in July 2003, simulcasting UPN programming from the low-power outlets; the three stations collectively branded as "UPN 54/58/48". In 2005, KCEB dropped its UPN affiliation to affiliate with The WB; subsequently thereafter in January 2006, KTPN-LP and KLPN-LP lost the UPN affiliation to CBS affiliate KYTX (channel 19), which added the network as a second digital subchannel; this resulted in the two stations reverting into independent stations.

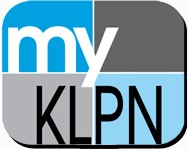
Logo as "My KLPN," used from 2006 until 2015

On January 24, 2006, CBS Corporation (which split from Viacom in December 2005) and Time Warner's Warner Bros. Entertainment (the division that operated The WB) announced that the two companies would shut down The WB and UPN and combine the networks' respective programming to create a new "fifth" network called The CW. One month later on February 22, News Corporation announced the launch of a new "sixth" network called MyNetworkTV, which would be operated by Fox Television Stations and its syndication division Twentieth Television. KTPN and KLPN became charter affiliates of MyNetworkTV when the network launched on September 5, 2006; KCEB took the CW affiliation when the network launched two weeks later on September 18 (The CW Plus feed carried by the station has since moved to KYTX's second digital subchannel).

On April 24, 2013, the Communications Corporation of America announced the sale of its television stations, including KETK-TV, to Nexstar Broadcasting Group. KFXK and KTPN were planned be sold to Nexstar partner company Mission Broadcasting; in the case of KFXK, that station was being sold to Mission to comply with FCC duopoly rules. But on August 5, 2014, Mission withdrew its application to acquire KFXK. Nexstar continues to operate KFXK and KLPN under a shared services agreement with sister station KETK. The sale was completed on January 1, 2015.

On July 6, 2021, Nexstar exercised its option to acquire KTPN-LD outright from White Knight. The transaction was completed on October 1.

== Technical information ==
=== Subchannel ===
Subchannel of KTPN-LD
Subchannel	Res.	Short name	Programming
36.1	720p	KTPN-LD	Main KTPN-LD programming

=== Analog-to-digital conversion ===
KLPN-LP shut down its analog signal over UHF channel 58 in January 2012, and "flash-cut" its digital signal into operation to UHF channel 47. KTPN-LP shut down its analog signal over UHF channel 48, in 2013, and flash-cut its digital signal into operation UHF channel 48.
