= Church of Lukumi Babalu Aye =

Santería church in Hialeah, Florida, US

Church of Lukumi Babalu Aye (CLBA) is a Santería church in Hialeah, Florida. The church practices Cuba's Santería tradition, also known as Lucumí or Regla de Ocha.

CLBA was founded and incorporated in 1974 by Oba Ernesto Pichardo and his associates. In the 1980s, the church decided to begin public services in Hialeah. The city of Hialeah responded by passing four ordinances which outlawed animal sacrifice. The dispute between the church and Hialeah went to the Supreme Court of the United States; the case, Church of the Lukumi Babalu Aye v. City of Hialeah, was resolved in CLBA's favor.

== See also ==
- Babalú-Ayé
