= Jeremy J. Ford =

American film director

Jeremy J. Ford is a film director and television writer based in Los Angeles, CA.

== Filmography ==
=== Feature films ===
Road to Sturgis, Ford's 2008 documentary (also credited as Road 2 Sturgis) follows the Randall Zwarte Band, a group of aging rockers who leave their families to chase a dream by performing at the Sturgis Motorcycle Rally in front of 700,000 people. The chronicle of the band’s journey is ultimately both defeating and redeeming. Aside from distribution the film airs on digital cable’s “On Demand” channels.

In 2005, an unfinished Road to Sturgis was nominated for four awards at the Wild Rose Independent Film Festival for Best Director (feature), Best Feature (student), Best Documentary, and Best Original Music.

His second feature, Mischievous Souls, is a skate drama based on the true story of three young skaters and the mistakes (all caught on tape) that alter their lives. This film hit the film festival circuit in 2009.

=== Reality TV ===
- Love Cruise (FOX-TV) (Dailies Editor)
- Welcome to the Parker (Bravo-TV) (Head Logger)
- Championship Gaming Series (Direct TV) (Field Logger)
- The Biggest Loser (NBC-TV) (Story Logger)
- A Shot at Love with Tila Tequila (MTV-TV) (Story Logger)
- Celebrity Rehab (VH1-TV) (Story Logger)
- Celebrity Rehab 2 (VH1-TV) (Story Logger)
- Sober House (VH1-TV) (Story Logger)
- Sunset Tan (E!-TV) (Story Logger)
- High School Reunion (ABC-TV) (Story Logger)
- Groomer Has It (Animal Planet-TV) (Story Logger)
- Groomer has It 2 (Animal Planet-TV) (Story Logger)
- Cops (TV) (Story Logger)
- Anchorwoman (TV series) (FOX-TV) (Story Logger)
- Charm School (VH1-TV) (Story Logger)
- Alter Eco (Discovery-TV) (Story Logger)
- Manhattan Moms (Bravo-TV) (Story Logger)
- Real World/Road Rules Challenge (MTV-TV) (Story Writer)
- Making the Band (MTV-TV) (Story Writer)
