= The Florida Star =

Weekly newspaper in Florida

- The 19 April 2014 front page of The Florida Star
- Type: Weekly newspaper
- Format: Broadsheet
- Owner(s): Clara McLaughlin
- Founder(s): Eric O. Simpson
- Publisher: Clara McLaughlin
- Founded: April 15, 1951
- Headquarters: Jacksonville, Florida
- Circulation: 21,000
- Sister newspapers: The Georgia Star
- Website: thefloridastar.com thegeorgiastar.com

The Florida Star is a weekly newspaper in Jacksonville, Florida. Founded in 1951 to cater to Jacksonville's African American community, it is the oldest African-American newspaper in Northeast Florida.

== History ==
The Florida Star was founded in 1951 by Eric O. Simpson, a veteran of national publications, to give Jacksonville its own African-American newspaper. The Star catered specifically to the city's black community at a time when other local media ignored or downplayed African-American and civil rights stories. During the 1950s and '60s it was one of the most significant forces championing civil rights in Jacksonville, pressuring the government to adopt reforms, endorsing black political candidates, and keeping its readers apprised of boycotts and sit-ins.

The Star also became known for its sensational crime reporting, which often included scandalous headlines printed in red. In 1983 the paper became embroiled in a legal battle when it printed a rape victim's name, leading to the U.S. Supreme Court case Florida Star v. B. J. F. A trainee reporter copied the police report, which included the victim's name, and the Star inadvertently included her name in an article. This violated the Star's internal policy and Florida's rape shield law. The victim sued and was awarded $97,500 in damages, greater than the paper's value. The Star appealed, eventually reaching the Supreme Court. In 1989 the Court overturned the earlier judgement, ruling that punishing a newspaper for reporting accurate, legally obtained material did not accord with the First Amendment.

In 1977, following telephone threats, The Florida Star headquarters on Myrtle Street was subject to an arson attack that damaged the lobby. In 1993, a second arson attack destroyed the building and much of its archive. Simpson and his family committed to maintaining the paper, publishing that week's issue only one day late.

Simpson headed the paper until his death in 1994. His wife, Mary Wooten Simpson, succeeded him; under her watch the paper expanded its staff, coverage, and circulation. Managing editor Erica Simpson, Eric and Mary Simpson's daughter, took over after her mother's death in 2001. Media pioneer Clara McLaughlin purchased the paper from the Simpson family in 2002 and currently serves as publisher. In January 2007, The Florida Star launched a Georgia edition, The Georgia Star.

== Awards and recognition ==
Eric Simpson was posthumously inducted into the Florida Press Association Hall of Fame in 2003. He was the first African-American to be inducted.
