= Florida Star v. B. J. F. =

- Supreme Court of the United States

Argued March 21, 1989 Decided June 21, 1989
- Full case name: The Florida Star v. B. J. F.
- Citations: 491 U.S. 524 (more) 109 S. Ct. 2603; 105 L. Ed. 2d 443; 1989 U.S. LEXIS 3120; 57 U.S.L.W. 4816; 16 Media L. Rep. 1801

Case history
- Prior: The Florida Star v. B.J.F., 530 So.2d 286 (1988) Supreme Court of Florida; Florida Star v. B.J.F., 499 So.2d 883 (1986) Fla. Dist. Court of Appeals

Holding
- Florida Stat. § 794.03 is unconstitutional to the extent it makes the truthful reporting of information that was a matter of public record unlawful, as it violates the First Amendment.

Court membership
- Chief Justice William Rehnquist Associate Justices William J. Brennan Jr. · Byron White; Thurgood Marshall · Harry Blackmun; John P. Stevens · Sandra Day O'Connor; Antonin Scalia · Anthony Kennedy

Case opinions
- Majority: Marshall, joined by Brennan, Blackmun, Stevens, Kennedy
- Concurrence: Scalia
- Dissent: White, joined by Rehnquist, O'Connor

Laws applied
- U.S. Const. amend. I

Florida Star v. B.J.F., 491 U.S. 524 (1989), is a United States Supreme Court case involving freedom of the press and privacy rights. After The Florida Star newspaper revealed the full name of a rape victim it got from a police report, the victim sued for damages. State law made it illegal for a publication to print a rape victim's name, and the victim was awarded damages. On appeal, the Supreme Court ruled the imposition of damages for truthfully publishing public information violates the First Amendment.

== Background ==
B.J.F. (referred to as B.J.F. in the filings) was a woman who reported to the Jacksonville Sheriff's Office that she had been robbed and sexually assaulted. The Sheriff's Office put the details of what happened, including the victim's full name, in the general crime report for the county, which is placed in its press room and made available. A trainee reporter for The Florida Star, a local newspaper in Jacksonville, Florida, copied the item verbatim. A Florida Star reporter then included the item in the October 29, 1983 issue of the paper, but erroneously included the victim's name in violation of the newspaper's internal policy not to identify rape victims.

On September 26, 1984, Freedman sued both the Sheriff's Office and the newspaper for violating Florida's shield law, Stat. § 794.03, which makes it unlawful to "print, publish, or broadcast... in any instrument of mass communication" the name of the victim of a sexual offense. The Sheriff's Office settled, paying the victim $2,500, but the newspaper would not. The trial court rejected the newspaper's defense that § 794.03 was unconstitutional, and the jury awarded Freedman $75,000 in compensatory damages and $25,000 in punitive damages.

The Florida First District Court of Appeal affirmed the trial court verdict, the Supreme Court of Florida denied discretionary review, and the United States Supreme Court granted certiorari.

== Opinion of the Court ==
The Court decided the facts in this case were not the same as those in Cox Broadcasting Corp. v. Cohn (1975), where a television station had obtained and reported the name of a rape victim from open court records, and the Supreme Court found the law there unconstitutional. The Court decided that the law was unconstitutional, but on much narrower grounds. First, the law made no effort to punish any party who disseminated the name of a rape victim except an "instrument of mass communication" which the law did not define. This meant that the most vicious gossip who spread the details around was not subject to the law, but supposedly a newspaper was. Second, the law basically punishes a newspaper which truthfully prints information which it had legitimately obtained from a government agency.

While a newspaper could be punished for truthfully reporting facts which were not public knowledge or which it unlawfully obtained (the Court referred back to prior cases where it gave examples of material a newspaper might legally be punished for publishing, such as the dates and times of troop ship movements during war), it is unconstitutional for a government agency to impose punishment upon a newspaper for truthfully publishing information that the government had in fact released publicly.

The judgment in favor of Freedman was reversed and the newspaper was found not liable.

== See also ==
- List of United States Supreme Court cases
- List of United States Supreme Court cases, volume 491
- List of United States Supreme Court cases by the Rehnquist Court
- List of United States Supreme Court cases involving the First Amendment
- Google v González, C-131/12 (2014)
- publication bans
- Post-assault treatment of sexual assault victims
