= KTRE =

Television station in Lufkin, Texas

Semi-satellite of KLTV, Tyler, Texas

- Lufkin–Nacogdoches, Texas; United States
- City: Lufkin, Texas
- Channels: Digital: 24 (UHF); Virtual: 9
- Branding: KTRE 9; East Texas News; Telemundo Este de Texas (9.2)

Programming
- Affiliations: 9.1: ABC; 9.2: Telemundo

Ownership
- Owner: Gray Media; (Gray Television Licensee, LLC)
- Sister stations: KLTV

History
- First air date: August 31, 1955
- Former channel numbers: Analog: 9 (VHF, 1955–2009); Digital: 11 (VHF, until 2009), 9 (VHF, 2009-2023)
- Former affiliations: NBC (primary 1955–1964, joint primary 1964–1984, secondary 1984–1987); CBS (secondary 1955–1964, joint primary 1964–1984); ABC (joint primary, 1964–1984)
- Call sign meaning: Trees, a reference to the heavily forested geography of the Lufkin area

Technical information
- Licensing authority: FCC
- Facility ID: 68541
- ERP: 300 kW
- HAAT: 140 m (459 ft)
- Transmitter coordinates: 31°25′10.3″N 94°48′4″W

Links
- Public license information: Public file; LMS
- Website: www.ktre.com; 9.2: www.noticiasetx.com

KTRE (channel 9) is a television station licensed to Lufkin, Texas, United States, affiliated with ABC and Telemundo. The station is owned by Gray Media, and maintains studios and transmitter facilities on TV Road (near US 69) in the unincorporated community of Pollok.

Although identifying as a separate station in its own right, KTRE is considered a semi-satellite of KLTV (channel 7) in Tyler. As such, it simulcasts all network and syndicated programming as provided through its parent station but airs separate commercial inserts, legal identifications, weeknight newscasts and Sunday morning religious programs, and has its own website. KTRE serves the southern half of the Tyler–Longview–Lufkin–Nacogdoches market while KLTV serves the northern portion. The two stations are counted as a single unit for ratings purposes. Although KTRE maintains its own facilities, master control and some internal operations are based at KLTV's studios on West Ferguson Street in downtown Tyler.

== History ==
The station first signed on the air on August 31, 1955; it was founded by the owners of now-defunct radio station KTRE (1420 AM), and originally operated as a satellite of Houston NBC affiliate KPRC-TV. However, it occasionally deviated from the KPRC schedule to air programming from ABC and CBS. In 1964, the Federal Communications Commission (FCC) collapsed Lufkin and Nacogdoches into the Tyler–Longview market. Soon afterward, the Buford family, owners of KLTV, bought KTRE and converted it into a semi-satellite of that station.

Until 1984, the station had an unusual "joint primary" arrangement with all three networks, with a slight favor towards ABC programming. Both stations lost CBS programming when KLMG-TV (channel 51, now KFXK-TV) signed on in September 1984, but retained a secondary affiliation with NBC until KETK-TV (channel 56) signed on in March 1987. KTRE and KLTV were sold to Civic Communications in 1989. Civic merged with Liberty Corporation in 2002, which in turn merged with Raycom Media in 2006.

For many years, the station operated at 26,000 watts from a tiny 540-foot (160 m) tower, which was short-spaced to prevent interference with CBS affiliate WAFB-TV in Baton Rouge, Louisiana, and later PBS member station KETG-TV in Arkadelphia, Arkansas. In the early 1980s, KTRE installed a new antenna and transmitter, operating at an increased power of 131 kW, but never reached full power because of the short-space interference it would cause to those other stations. Eventually, as noted in the Television Factbook, KTRE was allowed to increase visual power to 158 kW visual and 31.6 kW aural power (exactly half the maximum 316 kW visual power allowed by the FCC). On another front, the new transmitter antenna was directional to minimize overlap with KLTV to comply with FCC duopoly rules, which until 2000, prohibited one company from owning stations in adjacent markets that had significant signal overlap (constituting them as an illegal duopoly, even though they were located in different television markets).

On June 25, 2018, Gray Television announced that it was merging with Raycom, under the Gray name. When it was approved by the FCC and the Justice Department, it made KLTV and KTRE sisters to adjacent market stations KXII in Sherman, KBTX-TV in Bryan and KWTX-TV in Waco in addition to the current Raycom sister stations, while separating it from KXXV. The sale was approved on December 20, and was completed on January 2, 2019.

== News operation ==
KTRE presently broadcasts five hours of locally produced newscasts each week (with one hour each weekday). In other common news timeslots where the station does not produce its own locally based newscasts, KTRE simulcasts the weekday morning, midday, 4 p.m., 5 p.m. and weekend morning and evening newscasts from KLTV. The first news anchor at channel 9 was Murphy Martin, who later became a local television anchor in Dallas and eventually served as an anchor for ABC News.

== Technical information ==
=== Subchannels ===
The station's signal is multiplexed:

Subchannels of KTRE
Subchannel	Res.	Short name	Programming
9.1	720p	KTRE	ABC
9.2	480i	Telemun	Telemundo (4:3)
9.3	480i	Start	Start TV

KTRE carries Telemundo on digital subchannel 9.2; the subchannel is not carried on Suddenlink Communications.

=== Analog-to-digital conversion ===
KTRE shut down its analog signal, over VHF channel 9, on June 12, 2009, the official date on which full-power television stations in the United States transitioned from analog to digital broadcasts under federal mandate. The station's digital signal relocated from its pre-transition VHF channel 11 to channel 9 for post-transition operations.

== See also ==
- Channel 9 digital TV stations in the United States
- Channel 9 virtual TV stations in the United States
