= KETK-TV =

Television station in Jacksonville, Texas

- Jacksonville–Tyler–Longview, Texas; United States
- City: Jacksonville, Texas
- Channels: Digital: 22 (UHF); Virtual: 56
- Branding: KETK; KETK News

Programming
- Affiliations: 56.1: NBC; for others, see § Subchannels

Ownership
- Owner: Nexstar Media Group; (Nexstar Media Inc.)
- Sister stations: KTPN-LD, KFXK-TV, KFXL-LD; Tegna: KYTX

History
- First air date: March 9, 1987
- Former channel numbers: Analog: 56 (UHF, 1987–2009)
- Call sign meaning: "Keeping East Texas [K]overed"

Technical information
- Licensing authority: FCC
- Facility ID: 55643
- ERP: 1,000 kW
- HAAT: 458.8 m (1,505 ft)
- Transmitter coordinates: 32°3′41″N 95°18′51″W

Links
- Public license information: Public file; LMS
- Website: www.ketk.com

KETK-TV (channel 56) is a television station licensed to Jacksonville, Texas, United States, serving as the NBC affiliate for East Texas. It is owned by Nexstar Media Group alongside KTPN-LD (channel 36), an independent station with MyNetworkTV, and co-managed with Fox affiliate KFXK-TV (channel 51); Nexstar's Tegna subsidiary owns CBS affiliate KYTX (channel 19). KETK-TV, KLPN-LD and KFXK-TV share studios on Richmond Road (at Loop 323) in Tyler; KETK-TV's transmitter is located near FM 855 in northwestern Cherokee County.

KETK-TV began broadcasting in March 1987. Its sign-on gave East Texas full affiliates of all of the Big Three television networks for the first time; several groups had attempted to start NBC affiliates in the market in the preceding years. Texas American Broadcasting, the founding owner, sold the station in 1989 to Lone Star Broadcasting, a group headed by general manager Phil Hurley. That company launched KLSB in Nacogdoches, which at first served to rebroadcast most of the station's programming in the Nacogdoches–Lufkin area.

Lone Star Broadcasting sold KETK-TV to Max Media in 1997. Max Media sold its stations to Sinclair Broadcast Group the next year, but KETK-TV was small and geographically isolated from its other stations, so Sinclair leased and then sold it to regional broadcaster Communications Corporation of America (ComCorp). KETK continued to lease KLSB until it was sold in 2004 and relaunched as separate CBS affiliate KYTX. Nexstar acquired the ComCorp stations at the start of 2015, then purchased Tegna in 2026, reuniting KETK with KYTX. KETK is generally the second-rated outlet for local news in the market, behind longtime market leader KLTV and KTRE.

== History ==
=== Construction ===
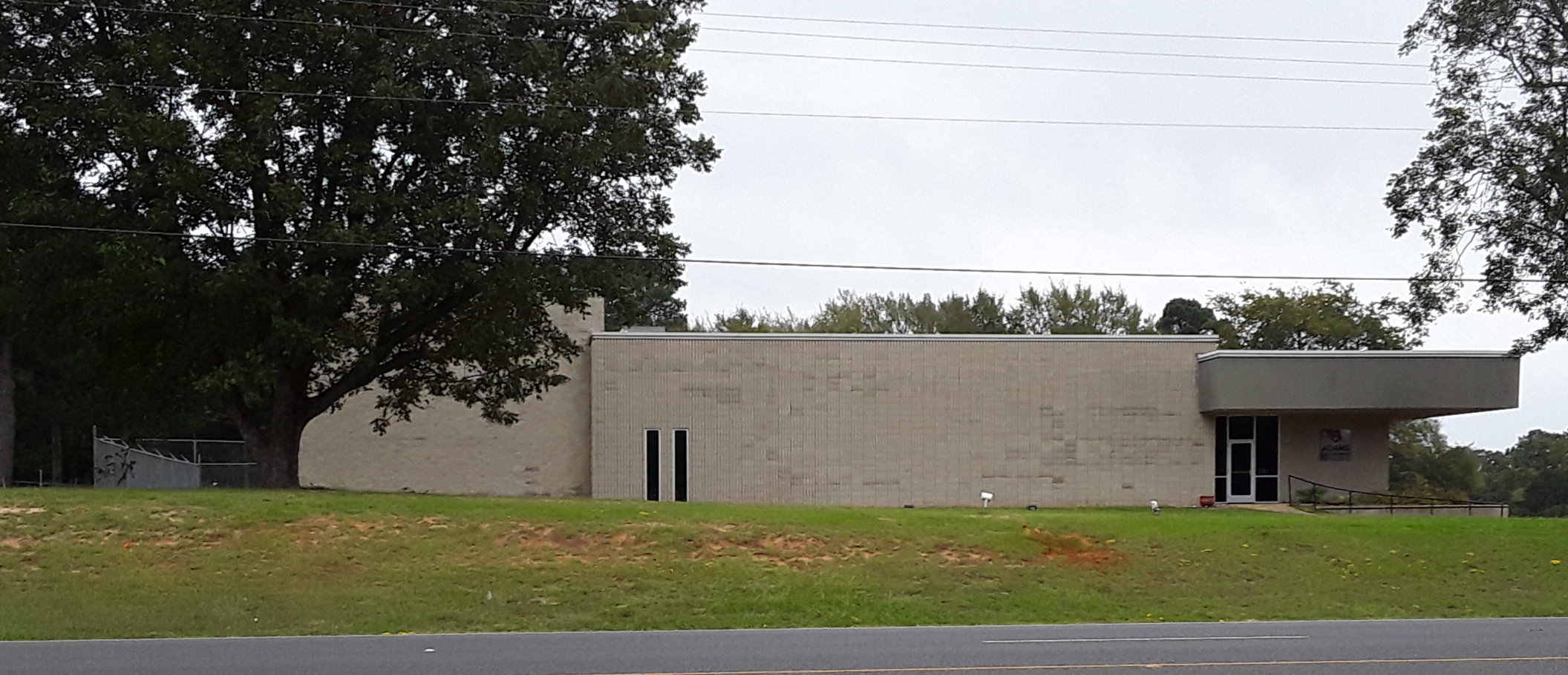
KETK's original studio facility in Jacksonville.

In 1984, the Tyler–Longview area gained its second network affiliate, CBS outlet KLMG-TV. As that occurred, the battle was on to build a third network-affiliated station to bring NBC to East Texas. The first contender was Sunrise Broadcasting, which applied in 1980 and merged with a competing applicant for channel 14 in December 1982; (Note: Principals in Sunrise Broadcasting were associated with the Ranchlander National Bank, a financial institution in Melvin, Texas, that failed due to bank fraud in November 1982.) East Texas Broadcasting, which was building another station, KTET (channel 60), was described as doing "too much, too soon" with no agreement in hand with the network: it went as far as hiring a news department before it was foreclosed on.

However, as other groups sought the NBC nod, it was held the entire time by another permittee: Thomas Robert Gilchrist, who won a construction permit in early 1985 for KTRG (using his initials). Gilchrist went bankrupt, and the construction permit and NBC affiliation agreement were sold to Texas American Broadcasting, in which two of the three partners were owners of KTEN in Ada, Oklahoma. Texas American proceeded to change the call letters to KETK and begin construction. Even before channel 56 was on the air, TAB was operating a low-power station providing NBC programming to the Jacksonville area.

KETK was originally planned to start in February, but equipment delays and high winds led it to be pushed back. Even with the delays, a tragedy occurred in the final stretch of construction when a crew repairing damage to the studio-transmitter link tower at the studios in Jacksonville from cold weather suffered an equipment accident, causing one man's death. It finally signed on March 9, 1987. KETK-TV joined KXAS-TV of Fort Worth on the Tyler cable system, though it did not invoke network non-duplication requiring the cable company in Tyler to make KETK the only source of NBC programming. The station made steady inroads in audience share in its early months on air. A tornado damaged the offices near Jacksonville in November 1987; the station was on the air the next day. Texas American Broadcasting sold the station to Region 56 Network, a subsidiary of Lone Star Broadcasting, in 1989; Region 56 was co-owned by the general manager, Phil Hurley, and TDH Capital Corporation.

=== Channel 19 in Nacogdoches ===
In September 1991, KETK launched a satellite station, KLSB-TV (channel 19), in Nacogdoches. It had its own studios in Nacogdoches, employing 40 people and producing separate evening newscasts. The launch of the Nacogdoches station led to changes in the regional composition of channel 56's newscasts. There were plans to split the news anchors between Tyler and Longview, but instead it was decided to not have a local anchor in Longview. KETK relocated its studios to a site in Tyler on Loop 323 in December 1991. In January 1994, separate Nacogdoches newscasts were discontinued, resulting in a net loss of about nine jobs with a continuing presence there.

Max Media (a successor in name only to the previous Max Media, which had owned KETK-TV in the late 1990s) acquired KLSB from KLSB Television LLC, a company which had leased its air time to KETK-TV, in 2003. It announced it would move its transmitter to cover Tyler and Longview and become the region's first CBS affiliate in more than a decade. This occurred in April 2004, when it became KYTX.

=== Max Media, Sinclair, and ComCorp ownership ===
Max Media Properties acquired KETK and KLSB for $17.1 million in 1996, a transaction made by Lone Star Broadcasting in order to pay out the private capital funds that had invested in the company. The sale was completed in March 1997; that December, Sinclair Broadcast Group acquired Max Media in a deal announced at the end of 1997, but it opted to sell KETK–KLSB. At the time, the only other Texas station owned by Sinclair was KABB in San Antonio, and it was geographically isolated from its other holdings. As a result, in January 1999, Sinclair sold the stations' non-license assets to Communications Corporation of America (ComCorp) for $36 million plus a $2 million option to later outright acquire the license assets; ComCorp owned other stations in Texas and Louisiana, including two other NBC affiliates. Hurley then left the station at the start of 2001 to become the president of Max Media's television stations.

ComCorp acquired the license assets of KETK-TV on December 29, 2004. In June 2006, the company filed for Chapter 11 bankruptcy protection. Simultaneously, White Knight Broadcasting, a related company that owned KFXK, filed for bankruptcy protection; by that time, the stations represented a virtual duopoly. A majority stake in White Knight was purchased by Anthony Malara in 2007.

=== Sale to Nexstar ===
On April 24, 2013, ComCorp announced the sale of its television stations, including KETK-TV, to Nexstar Broadcasting Group. KFXK and KTPN-LD were to be sold to Nexstar partner company Mission Broadcasting, primarily because an outright KETK–KFXK duopoly would not be legal. In August 2014, with the sale languishing, Mission withdrew its application, with White Knight continuing to own KFXK. The ComCorp sale was completed on January 1, 2015. (Note: White Knight also retained KTPN-LD until 2021, when Nexstar exercised an option to acquire it outright.) Nexstar completed a $4 million renovation of KETK's studio and office facilities in November 2017.

Nexstar acquired KYTX owner Tegna in a deal announced in August 2025 and completed on March 19, 2026. A temporary restraining order issued one week later by the U.S. District Court for the Eastern District of California, later escalated to a preliminary injunction, has prevented Nexstar from integrating the stations.

== News operation ==
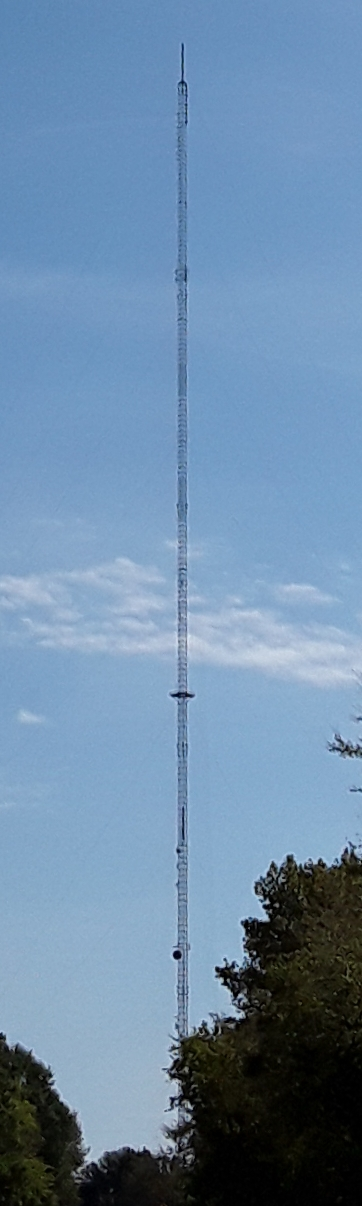
KETK's transmitter tower, located in unincorporated Cherokee County

KETK's founding news director was Ruth Allen Ollison, who came from the closed newsroom at KDAF in Dallas and left for WTTG in Washington, D.C. after just six months. Newscasts on weeknights were joined by a weekend newscast in January 1988.

After the sale to Lone Star Broadcasting, in 1990, the station briefly produced special "Longview Edition" newscasts seen in 32,000 cable homes in Longview, Gladewater, and other nearby cities, a practice ended in September 1991. The studios for the venture were leased from the Longview Daily News newspaper. While KLTV remained the leading choice of East Texas news viewers, KETK cemented itself as the second-rated station—the only other one with local news after KLMG discontinued newscasts and became Fox affiliate KFXK-TV.

KETK-TV lured KLTV anchor Chuck McDonald and meteorologist John Adams to the station in 1992. McDonald served as lead anchor before a stint as news director; he later left the station and resurfaced at KYTX in 2009. Adams remained until leaving TV news by 2006, being replaced by Dallas-market meteorologist Scott Chesner.

ComCorp used KETK-TV as a production hub for newscasts at some of the company's other stations. In addition to a newscast for KFXK-TV, which debuted in tandem with White Knight's sale out of bankruptcy, news programs seen on ComCorp's Fox affiliates in Waco and Baton Rouge and Shreveport, Louisiana, were presented from Tyler with stories sent from the local areas.

=== Notable former on-air staff ===
- Richelle Carey — morning news anchor, later at CNN Headline News
- Jonna Fitzgerald — news anchor, community relations director (1999–2005)

== Technical information ==
=== Subchannels ===
KETK-TV's transmitter is located near FM 855 in northwestern Cherokee County. Its signal is multiplexed:

Subchannels of KETK-TV
Subchannel	Res.	Short name	Programming
56.1	1080i	KETK-DT	NBC
56.2	480i	Grit	Grit
56.3	480i	ION	Ion
56.4	480i	Antenna	Antenna TV

=== Analog-to-digital conversion ===
When the digital television transition date was delayed from February to June 2009, KETK-TV intended to follow suit, but a major equipment failure led to the analog transmitter being permanently switched off on March 27, 2009. KETK-TV continued to broadcast in digital on channel 22, using virtual channel 56.
