= KFXK-TV =

Television station in Longview, Texas

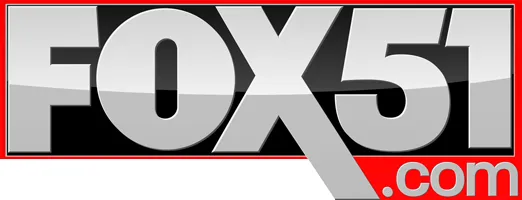
- Longview–Tyler, Texas; United States
- City: Longview, Texas
- Channels: Digital: 20 (UHF); Virtual: 51
- Branding: Fox51

Programming
- Affiliations: 51.1: Fox; 51.2: Independent with MyNetworkTV; for others, see § KFXK-TV subchannels

Ownership
- Owner: White Knight Broadcasting; (Warwick Communications, Inc.)
- Operator: Nexstar Media Group
- Sister stations: KTPN-LD, KETK-TV; Tegna: KYTX

History
- First air date: September 9, 1984
- Former call signs: KLMG-TV (1984–1991); KFXK (1991–2009)
- Former channel numbers: Analog: 51 (UHF, 1984–2009); Digital: 31 (UHF, 2006–2019)
- Former affiliations: CBS (1984–1991); UPN (secondary, 1995–1997)
- Call sign meaning: Fox

Technical information
- Licensing authority: FCC
- Facility ID: 70917
- ERP: 845 kW
- HAAT: 360.2 m (1,182 ft)
- Transmitter coordinates: 32°15′36.4″N 94°57′3.2″W

Links
- Public license information: Public file; LMS
- Website: www.ketk.com

Translator
- KFXL-LD
- Lufkin–Nacogdoches, Texas
- City: Lufkin, Texas
- Channels: Digital: 29 (UHF); Virtual: 30

History
- Former call signs: K30CS (CP, 1989–1997); KFXL-LP (1997–2012)
- Former channel numbers: Analog: 30 (UHF, 1998–2012)
- Call sign meaning: Fox Lufkin

Technical information
- Facility ID: 70918
- Class: LD
- ERP: 15 kW
- HAAT: 226 m (741 ft)
- Transmitter coordinates: 31°21′55″N 94°45′59″W

Links
- Public license information: LMS

KFXK-TV (channel 51) is a television station licensed to Longview, Texas, United States, serving East Texas as an affiliate of the Fox network. It is owned by White Knight Broadcasting and operated by Nexstar Media Group alongside KETK-TV (channel 56), an NBC affiliate, and KTPN-LD (channel 36), an independent station with MyNetworkTV; Nexstar's Tegna subsidiary owns CBS affiliate KYTX (channel 19). KFXK-TV, KETK-TV and KTPN-LD share studios on Richmond Road (near Texas Loop 323) in Tyler; KFXK-TV's transmitter is located near FM 125 in rural northwestern Rusk County (northwest of New London). It is rebroadcast by KFXL-LD (channel 30) in Lufkin, from a transmitter northwest of the city on SH 103 near Loop 287.

Channel 51 in Longview went on the air on September 9, 1984, as CBS affiliate KLMG-TV. It was owned by Clara McLaughlin and the first Black woman–owned television station in the United States. McLaughlin intended to develop an East Texas Television Network of stations to complement KLMG-TV to its south and northwest, but none of them materialized as the East Texas economy soured and the station struggled to secure financing. The station filed for Chapter 11 bankruptcy reorganization in 1987 and temporarily cut back its local newscasts, which returned the next year.

Kamin Broadcasting bought KLMG-TV out of bankruptcy in January 1991 and immediately moved to switch the station from CBS to Fox under new KFXK call letters. At the time, KLMG-TV was below the CBS affiliates from Dallas and Shreveport in the local ratings, but no Fox station was broadcasting to East Texas. The news department was also discontinued. Kamin died in 1992; his business partners, operating as Warwick Communications, sold KFXK to White Knight Broadcasting. White Knight's affiliate, Communications Corporation of America, began operating KETK-TV in 1999. The KETK-TV newsroom produces morning, early evening, and late evening newscasts for air on KFXK-TV.

== History ==
=== KLMG-TV: CBS affiliate (1984–1991) ===
Site of previous studios/offices for KLMG-TV and KFXK in Longview

In February 1982, the Federal Communications Commission (FCC) granted a company owned by Clara McLaughlin a construction permit to build a new TV station on channel 51 in Longview. McLaughlin reached an affiliation agreement with CBS in late December, and the station agreed to renovate the former Rollins Elementary School—once Longview's all-Black school—using tax-free bonds supplied by the city. Further, McLaughlin revealed plans to build three more stations as the "East Texas Television Network", including channel 19 in Nacogdoches, channel 42 in Paris, and channel 20 in Denison. By 1983, officials hoped that the new station would be in service by February 1984; work was just beginning on converting the disused elementary school into a TV station facility, having been delayed by construction and financing hangups. That date was missed, in part because of changing technological requirements; CBS was switching to satellite distribution of network programming, and the addition of the necessary dishes further delayed channel 51's launch.

KLMG-TV began broadcasting on September 9, 1984. It assumed the rights to CBS programming from KLTV (channel 7) in Tyler and KTRE (channel 9) in Lufkin, which were all-network stations primarily affiliated with ABC. Most notably moving from channel 7 was CBS's coverage of NFL football, including most Dallas Cowboys games; this irked fans in the Lufkin area, as KTRE lost the rights to the games even though that area fell outside of KLMG-TV's coverage. The new station's sign-on was also a historic moment; McLaughlin was the first African American woman and the twelfth Black person to own a television station in the United States. She was the only woman stockholder in East Texas Television Network alongside some 30 men. Sometimes, other investors questioned her business decisions; when she decided to renovate the Rollins School for the station's studios, some withdrew their support. McLaughlin noted, "One man went so far as to say [that] I should be at home working ... and taking care of my kids."

The station's business ambitions did not go to plan. Delays in construction, a sluggish regional economy in the years after channel 51 went to air and threatened litigation led East Texas Television Network to file for Chapter 11 bankruptcy reorganization on March 13, 1987. The largest creditors were banks and investors, such as Barclays. A week later, on March 20, the station canceled its local newscasts at 6 and 10 p.m., laying off its news staff of 13. A lawyer for Barclays stated in bankruptcy court that KLMG-TV was at risk of losing its CBS affiliation. The news department was reinstated on July 4, 1988, following a refinancing of East Texas Television Network.

In 1988, the bankruptcy court awarded ownership of KLMG-TV to Delta Broadcasting, which then filed with the FCC to have the license transferred to it. Delta also began handling management of KLMG-TV on an interim basis. However, McLaughlin and general manager Joe Deck, a partner in Delta Broadcasting, disputed who had operational and legal control of the station, with McLaughlin pointing out that Delta was not the licensee and Deck asserted too much operational control. The bankruptcy case languished for several more years. In August 1989, a bankruptcy judge approved the conversion of the Chapter 11 reorganization case to Chapter 7 liquidation, and a trustee was appointed. East Texas Television Network filed to have the proceeding reverted to Chapter 11.

=== KFXK: From CBS to Fox ===
In July 1990, the bankruptcy trustee asked the court to approve the sale of KLMG-TV to Kamin Broadcasting, a new Houston-based firm headed by Lester Kamin. The company decided to pursue a purchase of channel 51 because it believed that the Tyler–Longview market could support three TV stations. The license transfer was completed on January 9, 1991.

Five days later, Kamin announced that channel 51 would become an affiliate of Fox on April 1. The decision was made in part because CBS was available in the market on cable from KSLA in Shreveport, Louisiana, and KDFW-TV in Dallas, but there was no Fox affiliate. This was indeed the case; in a 1990 Arbitron ratings survey, KLMG-TV attracted fewer viewers than either of KSLA or KDFW and tied with multiple out-of-market stations available on cable. While the station initially announced its intention to keep a 9 p.m. local newscast after the affiliation switch, the news department was dissolved again in February 1991, believing a focus on community affairs programming would be more effective.

KLMG-TV became KFXK "Fox 51" on April 1, 1991. With no CBS affiliate in the market, NBC affiliate KETK-TV acquired the rights to Cowboys games. There would not be another East Texas–based CBS affiliate for 13 years, until KYTX began broadcasting in 2004.

Kamin died in September 1992, having already ceded control of Kamin Broadcasting to two former limited partners. Compared with its 1990 performance, the station attracted more of the audience as a Fox affiliate in the July 1992 Arbitron survey, earning a higher audience share than KSLA, KDFW, or any other non-local station. Kamin Broadcasting Company/Longview, the limited partnership that owned KFXK, merged into Warwick Communications in 1993.

In 1995, KFXK became a secondary affiliate of UPN. The next year, it acquired the low-power channel 48 (later KTPN-LP) in Tyler to move UPN programming to a dedicated outlet. In addition, the new station gained a second low-power companion in Longview.

=== ComCorp and Nexstar management ===
In 1998, White Knight Broadcasting, a company controlled by Sheldon Galloway, bought KFXK and its associated low-power stations from the successor to Warwick, Inwood Investors Partnership, for $11.5 million. By December 2000, Communications Corporation of America, owner of KETK-TV, was operating KFXK and KLPN-LP under a local marketing agreement with Warwick. After entering bankruptcy reorganization, a majority share in White Knight was sold to Malara Enterprises; Galloway remained involved in the buyer, and no changes were foreseen aside from the addition of a local newscast for KFXK.

ComCorp used KETK-TV as a production hub for newscasts at some of the company's other Fox-affiliated stations. In addition to the newscast for KFXK-TV, news programs seen on the Fox affiliates in Waco and Baton Rouge and Shreveport, Louisiana, were presented from Tyler with stories sent from the local areas.

On April 24, 2013, ComCorp announced the sale of its television stations, including KETK-TV, to Nexstar Broadcasting Group. KFXK and KTPN were planned be sold to Nexstar partner company Mission Broadcasting; in the case of KFXK, that station was being sold to Mission to comply with FCC duopoly rules. The deal languished, and on August 5, 2014, Mission withdrew its application to acquire KFXK. Nexstar continues to operate KFXK and KLPN under a shared services agreement with KETK. The sale was completed on January 1, 2015. (Note: White Knight also retained KTPN-LD until 2021, when Nexstar exercised an option to acquire it outright.) Nexstar renovated the shared KETK–KFXK office building in Tyler in 2017.

== Newscasts ==
KETK began producing a 9 p.m. newscast for KFXK in 2008. It was joined by a two-hour 7 a.m. newscast in 2011 as well as a 5:30 p.m. newscast in 2017.

== Technical information ==
KFXK-TV and KFXL-LD have different multiplex configurations. KFXK-TV is broadcast from a transmitter near FM 125 in rural northwestern Rusk County, northwest of New London. KFXL-LD's transmitter is northwest of Lufkin on SH 103 near Loop 287.

Subchannels of KFXK-TV
Subchannel	Res.	Short name	Programming
51.1	720p	KFXK-DT	Fox
51.2	720p	KTPN	KTPN-LD (Independent with MyNetworkTV)
51.3	480i	Escape	Ion Mystery
51.4	480i	Laff	Laff

Simulcast of subchannels of another station

Subchannel of KFXL-LD
Subchannel	Res.	Short name	Programming
30.1	720p	KFXK-DT	Fox

=== Analog-to-digital conversion ===
KFXK-TV shut down its analog signal, over UHF channel 51, on June 12, 2009, the official date on which full-power television stations in the United States transitioned from analog to digital broadcasts under federal mandate. The station's digital signal remained on its pre-transition UHF channel 31, using virtual channel 51.

KFXK-TV relocated its signal from channel 31 to channel 20 on April 12, 2019, as a result of the 2016 United States wireless spectrum auction.
