= Digital subchannel =

Transmitting multiple streams simultaneously

In broadcasting, digital subchannels are a method of transmitting more than one independent program stream simultaneously from the same digital radio or television station on the same radio frequency channel. This is done by using data compression techniques to reduce the size of each individual program stream, and multiplexing to combine them into a single signal. The practice is sometimes called "multicasting".

== ATSC television ==
=== United States ===
The ATSC digital television standard used in the United States supports multiple program streams over-the-air, allowing television stations to transmit one or more subchannels over a single digital signal. A virtual channel numbering scheme distinguishes broadcast subchannels by appending the television channel number with a period digit (".xx"). Simultaneously, the suffix indicates that a television station offers additional programming streams. By convention, the suffix position ".1" is normally used to refer to the station's main digital channel and the ".0" position is reserved for analog channels. For example, most of the owned-and-operated stations/affiliates of Trinity Broadcasting Network transmit five streams in the following format:

Subchannel	Res.	Programming
xx.1	720p	Trinity Broadcasting Network
xx.2	720p	TVDEALS (infomercials)
xx.3	480i	TBN Inspire
xx.4	480i	OnTV4U (infomercials) (4:3)
xx.5	480i	Positiv

The most of any large broadcaster in the United States, Ion Television stations transmit eight channels (in standard definition) and the Scripps Networks subchannel services Court TV, Ion Mystery, Bounce TV, Laff, Grit, and Ion Plus. More programming streams can be fit into a single channel space at the cost of broadcast quality. Among smaller stations, KAXT-CD in San Francisco is believed to have the most feeds of any individual over-the-air broadcaster, offering twelve video and several audio feeds (all transmitted in standard definition). WANN-CD in Atlanta, Georgia, with ten video and ten audio feeds, comes at a close second. Several cable-to-air broadcasters, such as those in Willmar, Minnesota and Cortez, Colorado, have multiplexed more than five separate cable television channels into subchannels of one signal.

Operating in a sector traditionally lacking subchannels, digital cable television provider Music Choice packages its nearly 50 music channels (including Music Choice Play) as digital subchannels of one channel. This is possible as the only information sent over each channel are audio feeds and a still slide which rotates every 20 seconds, displaying an advertisement and information about the current playing song on the individual channel. The audio feed and rotating stills occupy significantly less bandwidth than video feeds, leaving space for more multiplexed content.

A broadcaster saves significant costs in power and bandwidth through multiplexing in comparison to the cost of operating additional analog television stations to accommodate the extra programming. In practice, operating extra stations is impossible due to the required channel and distance separations combined with the available number of channels.

Most ATSC tuners will automatically add a new digital subchannel to their internal channel map, once it is tuned to the station carrying the new channel. However, some of these will not delete the channel if the station removes it.

Mobile DTV is also carried on ATSC stations, but as a separate service, according to the ATSC-M/H standard.

The Federal Communications Commission (FCC) considers all subchannels carried by a single station to have the same call letters for legal identification purposes. However, within the broadcast sales industry, to differentiate subchannels, the initial letter of a call sign changes per subchannel. As per Nielsen, digital stations identified with a "W" call letter will generally have their subchannels identified with an "E" (.2), "G" (.3), "H" (.4), "I" (.5) or "J" (.6). Digital stations identified with a "K" call-letter will generally have their subchannels identified with an "N" (.2), "O" (.3), "Q" (.4), "R" (.5) or "S" (.6). For example, if the call letters are WFRC and the station broadcasts on channel 10, then the 10.2 subchannel is identified as EFRC, 10.3 is GFRC, 10.4 is HFRC, 10.5 is IFRC and 10.6 is JFRC. If the call letters are KFRC and the station broadcasts on channel 10, then 10.2 is identified as NFRC, 10.3 is OFRC, 10.4 is QFRC, 10.5 is RFRC and 10.6 is SFRC.

=== Canada ===
Although digital television services in Canada use the same ATSC technology as the United States, none of the stations currently broadcasting a digital signal transmit any subchannel other than a possible HD service or a standard definition simulcast of the main channel. Unlike the FCC in the United States, the body that governs Canadian broadcasting licenses, the Canadian Radio-television and Telecommunications Commission (CRTC), requires stations to file license amendments in order to be considered for permission to carry digital subchannels (this differs from the commission's rules for premium cable television services, which allow the addition of multiplex channels consistent with the service's license requirements without the need to amend the license). On 17 August 2012, the CRTC gave approval to Leamington, Ontario community station CFTV-TV to broadcast four local subchannels on its digital signal, making it the first station in Canada to launch original content on its multiplex channels.

=== Mexico ===
Some Mexican TV stations use digital subchannels as they are used in the United States. The Sistema Público de Radiodifusión del Estado Mexicano, a public broadcaster, operates 26 multiplexed transmitters throughout Mexico carrying five to six public television services, while XHTRES-TDT carries Imagen Radio audio on a subchannel.

One notable experiment involving digital subchannels in Mexico was undertaken by TV Azteca, which used its three muxes in the Mexico City area to broadcast a service called Hi-TV, featuring several channels encoded in H.264 MPEG-4 encoding, which while available in the ATSC standard is not common on TV sets. This use of subchannels as pseudo-restricted signals within non-restricted channels was placed under investigation and litigation with authorities at COFETEL (the Federal Telecommunications Commission), involving a fine of 4,453,150 Mexican pesos. HiTV subchannels began broadcasting on an intermittent basis in 2013 and were almost completely deactivated in late 2014.

Televisa and TV Azteca use subchannels in rural areas in order to ensure national network service. As a result, since 2016, many areas that formerly had only one Azteca or Televisa network now have both from the same transmitter. Additionally, TV Azteca has two national services that are broadcast as subchannels in most areas, a+ and adn40.

In October 2016, the IFT put into effect new guidelines for the numbering of virtual channels. As a result, national networks use consistent numbers nationwide; SPR transmitters now use four or five major channel numbers (11, 14, 20, 22, and 45 in some areas). Prior to this, digital television stations usually used virtual channels corresponding to their former analog positions, still the case for certain local stations.

The IFT enforces minimum bitrates for digital television channels, and as such it is not possible for a station to broadcast two HD feeds in MPEG-2 encoding. Most HD feeds are provided in 1080i with all subchannels in 480i standard definition.

== DVB television ==
=== Australia ===
Australian digital subchannels are currently divided between high definition (HD), standard definition (SD) and radio subchannels (the latter type is only carried by the stations of non-commercial networks SBS Television and ABC Television). Each network currently has at least one HD sub channel. All networks use their HD subchannel to provide a simulcast of their primary channel or their multichannels.

Inclusive of their primary standard definition channels (ignoring HD):

- SBS Television offers three unique SD subchannels (SBS Food, NITV and SBS WorldWatch) and a HD simulcast of its primary channel (SBS HD); as well as its SBS Viceland and SBS World Movies channels with no SD simulcasts.
- ABC Television offers three unique SD subchannels (ABC TV Plus/ABC Kids, ABC Me, and ABC News) and a HD simulcast of its primary channel (ABC HD).
- The Seven Network offers two unique SD subchannels (7two and 7flix), a datacasting channel (Racing.com) and a HD version of its primary channel (7HD) as well as its 7two, 7mate and 7Bravo channels, with no SD simulcasts for both 7mate and 7Bravo.
- The Nine Network offers four unique SD subchannels (9Go!, 9Rush, 9Gem and 9Life), a datacasting channel (Extra) and a HD simulcast of its primary channel (9HD) as well as a HD simulcast of its 9Gem channel.
- Network 10 offers two unique SD subchannels (10 Peach, and 10 Shake), two datacasting channels (TVSN and gecko) and a HD simulcast of its primary channel (10 HD) as well as their 10 Bold channel with no SD simulcast.

Community television stations in Melbourne (C31) and Adelaide (C44) also broadcast digital signals, however they typically only broadcast a single SD subchannel which simulcasts that station's primary channel.

There have been a number of issues surrounding the introduction of digital subchannels in Australia. The first subchannels launched by the ABC – ABC Kids and Fly TV – closed after less than two years in operation in 2003 as a reaction to budget cuts by the conservative Howard government under Communications Minister Alston and low viewership (partly due to the limited distribution of set-top boxes); and commercial broadcasters could not legally air a digital subchannel other than a single high-definition service until 2009.

=== Europe ===
As most digital services in Europe rely on more complex methods of multiplexing, where a large number of digital channels by many different broadcasters can be broadcast on one single frequency, the concept of a subchannel is instead applied to the variety of channels that are produced by a single company. This can vary widely depending on the country: for example, ITV currently has six of its digital channels (ITV1, ITV1 +1, ITV2, ITV3, ITV4 and ITV Quiz) broadcasting on one multiplexed service, while three others (ITV2 +1, ITV3 +1 and ITV4 +1) are each broadcast on another, separate multiplex.

== ISDB television ==
In Japan and Latin America (except Colombia, Mexico and Panama), ISDB (similar to the DVB format) is used, and was specifically designed with physical RF segments that could be split to use for different subchannels.

In Japan, subchannel programming is used by NHK’s NHK General TV, NHK Educational TV (terrestrial) and NHK BS (satellite television channel), usually for sports broadcasts.

In Brazil, a digital subchannel was only allowed to the public and educational stations, until 2024, when commercial TV networks were allowed to have subchannels.

== Tradeoffs ==
As the amount of data which can be carried on one digital television channel at one time is limited, the addition of multiple channels of programming as digital subchannels comes at the expense of having less available bandwidth for other purposes, such as the ability to transmit high definition content. A station carrying multiple subchannels will normally limit itself to one high-definition channel (or in some cases, two HD channels), with any additional channels being carried in standard definition. Because of the tradeoffs, stations owned by CBS Corporation through its CBS Television Stations subsidiary (which include owned-and-operated stations of CBS and The CW, and some independent stations) generally opted not to carry digital subchannels and transmitted only a 1080i high definition main feed; this changed in 2013 with the addition of dedicated local news channels on CBS O&Os in New York City and Philadelphia (the company later announced the creation of Decades, a multicast network part-owned by CBS which aired on all CBS and CW owned-and-operated stations from 2015 to 2018).

It is possible for stations to carry more than two subchannel feeds in HD, at least nominally. Actual picture quality may be comparable to DVD video. Some examples of stations broadcasting in this format are:

Callsign	Market/city of license	Description
KBMT	Beaumont, Texas	In addition to broadcasting ABC programming on its main channel in 720p, KBMT transmits NBC programming on its second subchannel and Cozi TV on its third subchannel (all three channels are broadcast in 16:9 widescreen, although the DT3 subchannel is presented in 480i); the station also offers Me-TV programming in 480i 4:3 SD on its fourth subchannel.
KXII	Sherman, Texas	KXII carries Fox programming in HD on its third subchannel and MyNetworkTV programming in SD on its second subchannel, in addition to carrying CBS programming in HD on its main channel.
KTEN	Ada, Oklahoma	In addition to carrying NBC programming in HD on its main channel in 1080i, KTEN carries CW programming in 720p HD on its second subchannel and ABC programming in 720p HD on its third subchannel.
WGXA	Macon, Georgia	WGXA began carrying ABC programming on its second digital subchannel on 1 January 2010, after WPGA-TV disaffiliated from the network in a compensation and program content dispute; WGXA transmits its Fox-affiliated main channel and its ABC subchannel in 720p (the native HD resolution format for both networks). The station's main channel is branded as "Fox 24" and maps via PSIP as 24.1, while the ABC subchannel brands as "ABC 16", in reference to the station's physical digital channel 16 (but maps its PSIP virtual channel as 24.2). A standard definition feed of Comet was launched on its third subchannel in October 2015.
WKBN-TV	Youngstown, Ohio	WKBN carries a simulcast of Fox-affiliated sister station WYFX-LD on its second digital subchannel in order to make its programming available to the entire market (WYFX is licensed as a low-power station), in addition to transmitting CBS programming on its main channel. Until a later multiplexer upgrade, both subchannels transmitted in 720p HD (the main signal now transmits CBS's preferred 1080i HD format). Comparatively, its sister station, ABC affiliate WYTV transmitted both its MyNetworkTV-affiliated second subchannel and its Bounce TV-affiliated third subchannel in standard definition (since ABC and MyNetworkTV both transmit in 720p, the 33.2 subchannel could be reconfigured to high definition in a manner that creates limited issues in regards to bandwidth for the 33.3 subchannel). In 2017, WKBN sold its spectrum for $34 million as part of the FCC's spectrum reallocation program and merged their programming onto WYTV's, requiring the removal of the 33.3 signal in order to manage the high definition needs of three 720p channels and one in 1080i (two former WKBN and WYTV subchannels moved onto WYFX-LD's spectrum).
WTHI-TV	Terre Haute, Indiana	In addition to airing its main CBS program feed in 1080i, WTHI transmits Fox programming in 720p HD on its second subchannel and CW+ programming in 720p HD on its third subchannel, in addition to a standard definition 480i widescreen Ion Television feed on its fourth subchannel.
WTRF-TV	Wheeling, West Virginia	In addition to carrying CBS programming in 1080i on its main channel, WTRF-TV carries ABC programming in 720p on its third subchannel. Until the network moved to a subchannel of NBC affiliate WTOV-TV in September 2014, WTRF carried Fox programming in 720p on its second subchannel, which remains affiliated with MyNetworkTV.
WUVG-DT	Atlanta, Georgia	WUVG, which operates as a Univision owned-and-operated station, carries UniMás in 720p HD on its second subchannel due to a lack of a sister full-power station, and both GetTV and Escape in 480i on their respective third and fourth subchannels in addition to carrying Univision programming on its main channel in 720p HD.
WATM-TV	Johnstown, Pennsylvania	In addition to carrying ABC programming in 720p on its first subchannel, WATM-TV transmits Fox programming of its sister station, WWCP-TV, in 720p on its second subchannel. This enables the WWCP-TV signal to reach the State College area. WATM-TV further transmits This TV and Antenna TV programming in 480i on its third and fourth subchannels, respectively.
WKTV	Utica, New York	WKTV previously carried NBC programming in 1080i on its first subchannel, CBS programming on its second subchannel, and The CW on its third subchannel, both in 720p HD (in the case of WKTV-DT2, this differs from CBS's preferred 1080i HD format). All three networks are currently transmitting in 720p. The station also offers MeTV programming in 480i SD on its fourth subchannel.
WTVG	Toledo, Ohio	In addition to carrying ABC programming in 720p on its first subchannel, WTVG-TV transmits The CW programming in 720p on its second subchannel. This allows Toledo, Findlay, and surrounding areas to receive CW programming over-the-air; in the past CW and WB programming was exclusive to local cable viewers through Buckeye CableSystem via their cable-only Toledo 5 channel, requiring antenna viewers to pull in WKBD-TV/Detroit from the north for CW programming. WTVG-TV further transmits WeatherNation TV in 480i on its third subchannel.
WGEM-TV	Quincy, Illinois	The station broadcasts four subchannels in total, all in HD: the main subchannel in 1080i, and three additional subchannels – respectively affiliated with Fox, The CW and MeTV – in 720p.
WDTN	Dayton, Ohio	Through channel-sharing agreements with WBDT (Springfield, Ohio) and WKOI (Richmond, Indiana), WDTN's spectrum transmits two 1080i signals: NBC (channel 2) and The CW (channel 26). WDTN's spectrum also carries Ion Mystery, Bounce, and Ion in 480i. Through the use of PSIP, these channels appear to the viewer to be three different channels: 2 (NBC), 26 (The CW) and 43 (Ion)

Outside the United States – especially in Europe – high-definition feeds are rarer, and most countries only provide a single high-definition service for each broadcaster. For example, in France, there are only five HD services: one each for TF1, France 2, Canal+, M6 and Arte; in the United Kingdom, four HD services are currently transmitted over terrestrial frequencies: BBC One HD, BBC Two HD, ITV HD and Channel 4 HD (S4C Clirlun is broadcast in Wales instead of Channel 4 HD).

== Television applications ==
=== Commercial networks ===
In the United States, digital subchannels have been used to provide programming from multiple major networks on a single television station. This has become prevalent since the late 2000s in smaller markets that have as few as one or two commercial stations, which during the era of analog television, would not have been able to carry the complete programming lineups of all four major commercial networks (CBS, NBC, ABC and Fox) because of the station's own local and syndicated programming commitments, and overlapping network programs that would be tough to schedule outside of regular timeslots. A prime example is the Wheeling, West Virginia/Steubenville, Ohio market, which for decades was home to only two stations (CBS affiliate WTRF-TV and NBC affiliate WTOV-TV; the cable-only WBWO also served the market as a WB and now as a CW affiliate) and had to mostly rely on stations in Pittsburgh (and to a lesser extent Columbus and Youngstown, Ohio) to view programming from other networks. However, the advent of digital television allowed WTRF to launch two digital channels (one as a primary Fox/secondary MyNetworkTV affiliate, the other affiliated with ABC) while still carrying CBS programming in full on its main signal (WTOV later took the Fox affiliation for its second subchannel in September 2014).

Upon their launches in September 2006, The CW and MyNetworkTV were among the first conventional networks to actively utilize subchannel-only affiliations in markets where a standalone station is not available to affiliate with; this is particularly true of The CW's small-market feed, The CW Plus, which originally consisted mostly of cable-only affiliations (by way of inheriting the model and much of the affiliate body of predecessor The WB 100+ Station Group). Since its launch, affiliates of other major networks have taken over the operations of cable-only CW Plus affiliates (or even outright replacing WB 100+ cable channels at the launch of The CW) and began transmitting the service over subchannels to reach viewers who do not subscribe to a pay television service. Some Spanish language networks (such as Estrella TV and Telemundo) have also been carried on digital subchannels, either as subchannel-exclusive services or to provide programming to markets where a main channel affiliation may not be available. Other stations have launched subchannels with an independent station format on their DT2 signals (such as WTTV in Indianapolis, Indiana – a market with enough commercial stations able to support affiliations with all six networks and a standalone independent, although the seventh (WTTK) instead acts as a WTTV satellite – which converted its 4.2 subchannel as an independent station in January 2015 as a result of owner Tribune Media selling the local rights to the CW affiliation that was to move from its main feed on 4.1 to Media General-owned WISH-TV, whose CBS affiliation was assumed by WTTV).

Digital subchannels are also used to relay stations beyond their traditional signal coverage areas to reach an entire market. In the Upper Peninsula of Michigan and northern Minnesota, many of these stations are on duplicate frequencies to cover a large market area. This is used to duplicate network service for stations that are part of duopolies, where transmitters scattered through a large geographical area allow multiple networks and channels to be carried. The most prominent example is the Granite Broadcasting Corporation's virtual quadropoly in Duluth, Minnesota, which consists of two separate full-power stations, NBC affiliate KBJR-TV and CBS affiliate KDLH, which combined carry three subchannels (two affiliated with major networks – CW Plus affiliate "Northland CW 2" on KDLH and MyNetworkTV affiliate "My9" on KBJR – and the third, a local weather subchannel on KBJR). While KDLH carries the CW subchannel on their DT2 feed and KBJR carries the MyNetworkTV subchannel on its DT2 feed on their primary signals, all five channels are carried on satellite station KRII in Chisholm, providing the Iron Range region (located north of Duluth) programming from networks that were previously unavailable over-the-air. In the Traverse City-Cheboygan market in Upper Michigan, NBC affiliate WPBN/WTOM also simulcasts sister station WGTU/WGTQ, providing that station's ABC programming to the entire market; CBS affiliate WWTV/WWUP carries its Fox-affiliated sister WFQX/WFUP on their DT2 subchannel to expand their coverage area further north into the eastern portion of the Upper Peninsula.

In many cases, these "new" channels are existing secondary channels that were carried by a low-power or Class A station or by a cable television channel. Often, the owner of a full-power television station acquires or already owns a low-power secondary station in the same market to carry another network. The use of a digital subchannel on a full-power television station as a replacement for low-power station greatly increases the available coverage area for its programming.

Because of interference issues that stations transmitting on the low VHF band (channels 2 to 6) often experience, some stations broadcasting on these frequencies are relayed on the subchannels of stations that are less prone to interference. An example of this is CBS affiliate WHBF-TV in Rock Island, Illinois. While WHBF broadcasts its main digital on VHF channel 4 in high definition, CW-affiliated sister station KGCW in Burlington, Iowa, relays a standard-definition subchannel feed of WHBF over virtual channel 26.4.

Since the late 2010s, some station groups have started consolidating major network affiliations onto one signal if they own the non-licensing assets of those channels. Some of this was due to the 2016 United States wireless spectrum auction, but most have been due to companies who use sidecar companies to create virtual duopolies via local marketing agreements when they are not legally able to own a duopoly outright. In the latter scenario, the station whose programming is on an LMA station is moved to a subchannel of a station that is owned outright by the station that own the non-licensed assets of other stations. Many companies such as Sinclair Broadcast Group (via Cunningham Broadcasting, Deerfield Media, & Howard Stirk Holdings), Nexstar Media Group (via Mission Broadcasting & Vaughan Media), and Gray Television (via American Spirit Media & SagamoreHill Broadcasting) have been doing this, partially due to regulation pressure.

=== Sports programming ===
Networks dedicated to sports programming have been launched specifically for use on digital subchannels. Until 2010, CBS affiliates often subdivided four temporary subchannels in order to show all of the early round games of the NCAA men's basketball tournament in addition to those broadcast on the main digital channel (this was superseded as a result of a new television agreement with the NCAA that took effect in 2011, which gave cable networks TBS, TNT and TruTV partial rights to the tournament). Most of the major professional sports leagues, however, have strict prohibitions against using subchannels for carrying multiple game broadcasts and only allow one game to be aired in a market at one time (outside of Los Angeles, where if the Rams and Chargers play at the same time, Fox is allowed to broadcast the second game on MyNetworkTV affiliate KCOP-TV, or CBS on independent KCAL-TV, depending on the game's carrier that specific week); all four of the major sports leagues (the NFL, the NBA, Major League Baseball and the NHL) have out-of-market sports packages that require a pay television subscription and generate significant revenue for the leagues.

Most sports programming on digital subchannel broadcasters has been relegated to low-budget content such as amateur athletics, extreme sports, and hunting and fishing programming geared toward outdoorsmen, though minor league baseball, American Hockey League hockey and other minor league sports may also be seen. Prominent team sports programming on digital subchannels is rare; the general trend for sports programming tends to eschew the free-to-air model that digital subchannels use, and the cost of rights fees for most sports requires that they air on channels that air on cable and satellite television services and thus can recuperate costs through retransmission consent. Channels such as Sportsman Channel (and the now-defunct Universal Sports) that began as digital subchannel networks now operate as cable and satellite-exclusive services. There are nonetheless a few multicast channels that have broadcast familiar sports programs: Bounce TV, for instance, carried college football from historically black colleges and universities until 2013.

In January 2016, Sinclair Broadcast Group launched a 24-hour feed of its American Sports Network sports syndication service on subchannels of ten stations owned and/or operated by the group; the ASN multicast network was subsequently replaced by Stadium in August 2017, following the formation of a multi-platform network venture with the Chicago White Sox's Silver Chalice unit and 120 Sports.

2023 saw the moves of two National Hockey League team broadcasts to digital subchannels, in at least part of the team's market. In May 2023, the Vegas Golden Knights and Scripps Sports announced plans to bring the team's broadcasts to over-the-air television in the home market; as part of the deal, Golden Knights games air on the second subchannel of KIVI in Boise, KSAW-LD in Twin Falls, and the Montana Television Network. In October of that year, the Arizona Coyotes moved their broadcasts to Scripps Sports, where the games air on the second subchannel of KNXV in Phoenix and KGUN in Tucson.

=== Local and informational channels ===
Although not to the same level as in the late 2000s due to the population of entertainment-based multicast services, many local stations have used or currently use subchannels to carry continuous news or local weather content; in particular, there have been at least four networks that have been created to serve this audience: NBC Weather Plus (a service exclusive to NBC stations that operated from 2004 to 2008), The AccuWeather Channel, WeatherNation TV (which also maintains limited exclusive distribution on pay television services) and TouchVision. Locally programmed news subchannels (such as News 9 Now / News on 6 Now on KWTV in Oklahoma City and KOTV in Tulsa, Oklahoma or NewsChannel 5+ on WTVF in Nashville, Tennessee) often carry rebroadcasts and simulcasts of local news programs seen on the station's main feed, in some cases displaying a ticker with news headlines and weather forecasts to provide updated information.

Subchannels also allow stations to air news programs without fully pre-empting normally scheduled programing on the station's main feed. During significant breaking news or severe weather events, for instance, a station may choose to air extended news coverage on either its main channel or a subchannel and air network programming on the other. Thus, the station can accommodate viewers wanting to watch either regular programming or news coverage. Some sports leagues, most notably the NFL, have strict rules against their game broadcasts airing on a subchannel.

=== Specialty programming ===
The first major nationally distributed general entertainment digital multicast television network, or diginet, for use on subchannels was Retro Television Network in 2005. Several new services launched or attempted to launch in 2008, including This TV, utilizing classic TV programming and library movies. This time period also saw the launch of some of the first services for public TV stations in the United States, such as Create.

The field of diginets grew throughout the 2010s. MeTV, once a local service in Chicago and Milwaukee, became nationally distributed in 2010; by 2014, it was the most widely distributed diginet, and it remains the most watched with prime time viewership eclipsing some cable channels. Station groups also increased their presence in the space, most notably the E. W. Scripps Company's 2017 acquisition of Katz Broadcasting, which was seen as giving the sector legitimacy. Ratings and coverage have increased as these channels seek to reach cord cutters who still use antennas to receive broadcast signals.

Diginets generally are reliant on national advertising revenue and, in some cases, pay stations to be carried on their subchannels, prizing lower channel numbers. Some have obtained national distribution on paid and free ad-supported streaming TV services.

=== Educational programming ===
Many PBS member stations around the United States broadcast their main channel in high definition and up to three standard definition subchannels; however, a few reconfigure their digital channels depending on daypart, carrying four standard definition channels during the daytime, reducing them to one HD and one SD channel at night due to technical limitations at the station's level that may prevent it from carrying PBS programming in HD full-time and maintain multiple full-time subchannels like other member stations. PBS stations often carry additional national channels such as PBS HD (PBS Satellite Service), PBS Kids, World, and Create. In the Washington, D.C. area, MHz Networks is available as ten subchannels transmitted by two stations, with their virtual channels mapped uniformly, making them appear as if they are transmitted by one station.

In some U.S. states, statewide educational, cultural or public affairs services are carried on a digital subchannel of a PBS member station or network (such as the Minnesota Channel, PBS Wisconsin's Wisconsin Channel, or New York State broadcaster ThinkBright TV). The use of subchannels has also allowed educational television broadcasters to sell off former secondary PBS analogue stations to commercial broadcasters (such as WNEQ in Buffalo, which its sister station WNED-TV sold in 1999 to LIN TV (now owned by Nexstar Media Group) to become WNLO, now a CW affiliate), as the additional educational content these separate stations once provided can now be carried by multiple subchannels of a single parent station. Subchannels also allow some educational stations to devote an entire channel to telecourses, which are recorded by instructors and students for later use, allowing the station's main channel to air a generalized schedule in the morning and overnight hours.

=== Temporary installations ===
Subchannels and transmitter reconfigurations have been used to temporarily restore service from a station that is unable to broadcast for technical, weather-related, or other reasons using the facilities of another. This use dates to the early days of digital television: in the immediate aftermath of the 11 September attacks, which destroyed the primary TV transmission site in New York City, WWOR-TV was broadcast as a subchannel of co-owned WNYW-DT. Competing stations in a market have even offered each other support; in 2009, Weigel Broadcasting offered the use of a subchannel to Milwaukee's WTMJ-TV when its transmitter was disabled by lightning, only for WTMJ to reciprocate the next year when flooding took Weigel's WDJT-TV out of service for three days. For five months from October 2019 to 2020, commonly operated WBBH-TV and WZVN-TV in Fort Myers, broadcast from the former's facility on one multiplex to allow for an overhaul of the latter's antenna.

=== Data, radio and non-public signals ===
In rare cases, digital television broadcasters have included a service known as DTV radio, in which the audio of a commonly owned broadcast radio station is simulcast over a subchannel (for instance, KPJK in San Mateo, California broadcasts former FM sister KCSM on its DT3 signal). WANN-CD in Atlanta offers six radio stations owned by iHeartMedia, in addition to ten television channels.

Non-broadcast content, subscription television channels or datacasting operations unrelated to the main television programming are also permitted by the digital television standards but are less-commonly used. USDTV was an over-the-air pay television service that used H.264 compression instead of standard MPEG-2. Mobile DTV now uses MPEG-4 compression, which like H.264 yields a much lower bitrate for the same video quality. For example, the Sezmi TV/DVR service uses broadcast digital subchannels (not in the clear) in selected cities to stream a limited number of "cable" channels to its subscribers for an additional fee to supplement its otherwise free digital video recorder (DVR) service allowing recordings of local broadcast channels and free and subscription internet content.

== Technical considerations ==
Digital television supports multiple digital subchannels if the 19.39 Mbit/s (megabits per second) bitstream is divided. Therefore, station managers and broadcast engineers could run any of the following scenarios using one 6 MHz channel (note that the actual bitrate moves up and down, due to usage of variable bitrate encoding):

HDTV channels		Subchannels
1× 1080i or 720p HDTV (19 Mbit/s)		No additional subchannels.
1× 1080i or 720p HDTV (15 Mbit/s)	+ 1	480p or 480i SD subchannel (~3.8 Mbit/s)
1× 1080i or 720p HDTV (11 Mbit/s)	+ 1	720p HDTV (8 Mbit/s) subchannel
1× 1080i or 720p HDTV (11 Mbit/s)	+ 2	480p or 480i SD subchannels (~3.8 Mbit/s each)
1× 720p HDTV channel (8 Mbit/s)	+ 3	480p or 480i SD subchannels (~3.8 Mbit/s each)
2× 720p HDTV channels (9.6 Mbit/s each)		No SD subchannels
2× 720p HDTV channels (7.8 Mbit/s each)	+ 1	480p or 480i SD subchannel (~3.8 Mbit/s)
No HDTV channels	+ 2	480p or 480i SD subchannels (~6 Mbit/s each)
No HDTV channels	+ 3	480p or 480i SD subchannels (~6 Mbit/s each)
No HDTV channels	+ 4	480p or 480i SD subchannels (~4.2 Mbit/s each)
No HDTV channels	+ 5	480p or 480i SD subchannels (~3.8 Mbit/s each)
No HDTV channels	+ 6	480p or 480i SD subchannels (~3.1 Mbit/s each)
No HDTV channels	+ 7	480p or 480i SD subchannels (~2.7 Mbit/s each)
No HDTV channels	+ 8	480p or 480i SD subchannels (~2.4 Mbit/s each)
No HDTV channels	+ 9	480p or 480i SD subchannels (~2.1 Mbit/s each)
No HDTV channels	+ 10	480p or 480i SD subchannels (~1.9 Mbit/s each)
No HDTV channels	+120	mono radio subchannels (~0.2 Mbit/s each)

With improvements in MPEG encoding, and tighter VBR encoding, more subchannels can be combined. 1×720p + 3×480i is becoming more common.

For a frame rate of 30p or 60i, uncompressed DTV channels have the following data rates in megapixels per second:

60 Hz
- 640×480i60/p30 (NTSC SDTV): 9.216
- 704×480i60/p30 (ATSC wide SDTV): 10.1376
- 720×480i60/p30 (NTSC DVD): 10.368
- 1280×720p30: 27.648
- 1280×720p60: 55.296
- 1920×1080i60/p30: 62.208
50 Hz

- 704×576i50/p25 (PAL SDTV): 10.1376
- 720×576i50/p25 (PAL DVD): 10.368
- 1280×720p25: 23.04
- 1280×720p50: 46.08
- 1920×1080i50/p25: 51.84

For ATSC, these must be compressed into 19.4 Mbit/s total per physical 6 MHz RF channel over the air, and 38.8 Mbit/s for cable.

== Digital radio ==
Various forms of digital radio also allow for multiple program streams.

=== HD Radio ===
The primary distinguishing feature of HD Radio has been its ability to multiplex an FM radio signal. As HD Radio never achieved widespread popularity in the United States (unlike television, radio is not required to turn off its analog signals due to HD Radio being in-band on-channel and thus compatible with analog, plus the greater quantity and difficulty in signal conversion of radios compared to fixed-link television sets), its use has largely been to serve as a legal fiction. Since HD Radio was introduced in the United States in the late 2000s (decade), the FCC has allowed American broadcasters to use low-powered translators to transmit HD Radio subchannels in analog FM. This has allowed broadcasters to increase the number of programming choices available in a given media market beyond FCC limits.

AM broadcasting generally lacks the bandwidth to multiplex; though in theory an AM station could transmit two separate channels using C-QUAM AM stereo, there is a limit to how far the two audio channels can be separated, and thus crosstalk is inevitable. HD Radio can be used on AM, but the bandwidth limits the digital signal to a single channel, which under FCC rules must match the analog signal. AM broadcasters have criticized the use of HD Radio on AM due to the increased adjacent-channel interference caused by the greater bandwidth it requires, with little benefit. WWFD has operated as a digital-only station with no analog signal under special dispensation since 2018; in December 2019, it began testing a multiplexed digital signal with two channels. No consumer radio receivers currently have the capability to receive AM multicast signals, and thus (as with FM HD Radio) WWFD's signals have been carried on FM translators (and the Internet) to ensure continued availability. The FCC, in October 2020, concluded from WWFD's experiments: "the record does not establish that an audio stream on an HD-2 subchannel is currently technically feasible(.)" A proposed FCC rule would require stations that wish to multiplex their digital AM signals to request and receive permission to do so.

== See also ==
- In-band on-channel (IBOC), digital radio technology allowing digital subchannels on FM stations
- DAB and DVB, international digital radio-television standards in use in Europe, Australia and New Zealand
- QAM tuner
