= WFQX-TV =

Television station in Cadillac, Michigan

WFQX-TV and WFUP

WFQX-TV: Cadillac–Traverse City, Michigan; WFUP: Vanderbilt, Michigan; United States
- Channels for WFQX-TV: Digital: 32 (UHF); Virtual: 32
- Channels for WFUP: Digital: 21 (UHF); Virtual: 45
- Branding: Local 32; 9&10 News on Local 32; Northern Michigan CW 32 (32.2)

Programming
- Affiliations: 32.1/45.1: Fox; 32.2: The CW Plus; 45.2: CBS; for others, see § Technical information

Ownership
- Owner: Cadillac Telecasting Company (sale to Mario Peter Iacobelli Revocable Trust pending)
- Operator: 910 Media Group via SSA
- Sister stations: WWTV/WWUP-TV

History
- Founded: WFQX-TV: February 9, 1987; WFUP: April 9, 1992
- First air date: WFQX-TV: October 6, 1989; WFUP: January 11, 1993
- Former call signs: WFQX-TV: WGKI (1989–2000); WFUP: WGKU (1992–2000); WFVX (2000–2003)
- Former channel number: WFQX-TV: Analog: 33 (UHF, 1989–2009); Digital: 47 (UHF, 2002–2009); Translators: W31BO Alpena; W43CM Pickford–Hessell (2005); W43CM Pickford (2007–2008); W54CR Traverse City; W61CR Sault Ste. Marie (1995–2008); WFUP: Analog: 45 (UHF, 1993–2009); Digital: 59 (UHF, 2007–2009)
- Former affiliations: UPN (secondary, 1995–2006)
- Call sign meaning: WFQX-TV: refers to Fox; WFUP: Fox Upper Peninsula

Technical information
- Licensing authority: FCC
- Facility ID: WFQX-TV: 25396; WFUP: 25395
- ERP: WFQX-TV: 200 kW; WFUP: 100 kW
- HAAT: WFQX-TV: 422 m (1,385 ft); WFUP: 324.7 m (1,065 ft)
- Transmitter coordinates: WFQX-TV: 44°8′12″N 85°20′33″W; WFUP: 45°10′12″N 84°45′4″W
- Translators: WWTV 9.2 Cadillac; WWUP-TV 10.2 Sault Ste. Marie; W23FL-D Traverse City

Links
- Public license information: WFQX-TV: Public file; LMS; WFUP: Public file; LMS
- Website: www.9and10news.com/wfqx/

WFQX-TV (channel 32) in Cadillac, Michigan, and WFUP (channel 45) in Vanderbilt, Michigan, are television stations serving as the Fox affiliates for the northern Lower and eastern Upper peninsulas of Michigan. They are owned by Cadillac Telecasting Company, which maintains a shared services agreement (SSA) with 910 Media Group, owner of Cadillac-licensed CBS affiliate WWTV, channel 9 (and its Sault Ste. Marie–licensed full-time satellite, WWUP-TV, channel 10), for the provision of certain services. The stations share studios on Cass Street in downtown Traverse City; WFQX-TV's transmitter is located on 130th Avenue northeast of Tustin, while WFUP's tower sits on Hudson Lookout in southeastern Charlevoix County.

WFUP operates as a full-time satellite of WFQX; its existence is only acknowledged in station identifications. Unlike its parent station, WFUP does not carry any of WFQX-TV's subchannels and has a different subchannel lineup. Aside from the transmitter, WFUP does not maintain any physical presence locally in Vanderbilt. Unlike other network affiliates in Northern Michigan, the WFQX and WFUP combination does not incorporate the satellite station's channel number in its branding; the stations are simply referred to as Local 32.

== History ==
The station first signed on the air as WGKI on UHF channel 33 on October 6, 1989. Its transmitter was just north of the current location in northern Osceola County. The original call letters referred to founder Gary Knapp, a former DJ and television personality. Despite its limited reach, WGKI was available on local cable systems. Prior to WGKI, Northern Michigan received Fox programming on cable from WKBD in Detroit.

In the station's early years, the channel was extremely low-budget. This was evident in the station's use of 1970s-era electronic graphics for the first few years of broadcasting. Due to the growing popularity of the Fox network and shows such as The Simpsons and Married... with Children, the station quickly grew. The on-screen graphics were modernized and it started to use higher-quality video equipment.

In the early 1990s, WGKI launched several repeaters in the Eastern Upper Peninsula unreached by the station's analog signal. By the mid-1990s, the station moved into permanent studios southeast of Cadillac along US 131. On January 11, 1993, the station launched WGKU in Vanderbilt on channel 40 as a full-time satellite of WGKI reaching the Gaylord and Petoskey areas. (As mentioned above, unlike the other network affiliates in the market, the station was simply known as "Fox 33" and didn't include any of the other satellites and repeaters used in the branding; they were simply listed under the graphic on the legal ID.)

When CBS affiliate WJBK-TV in Detroit switched its affiliation to Fox in December 1994 (which caused WGPR-TV to become the new CBS affiliate for Detroit), WGKI started using that station's resources. The move also disallowed rival WKBD from distributing Detroit Red Wings and Tigers games to WGKI. Knapp made a station promo explaining the situation between the three stations. When the Fox affiliation switch in Detroit was made, WGKI replaced WKBD on cable systems in Mid-Michigan and the Eastern Upper Peninsula. This was done so viewers without a local Fox station would maintain access to the network's programming. As a consequence, WGKI also expanded into parts of the Flint, Lansing, Grand Rapids, and Detroit markets via cable carriage. As a result, some cable viewers (especially in Bay City, Saginaw, and Michigan's Thumb area) found out that most of WGKI's programming, especially those from Fox, were being blacked out by request of the local affiliate. Soon after, many systems outside Northern Michigan and the Upper Peninsula dropped WGKI and/or brought back WKBD.

On January 16, 1995, WGKI became a secondary affiliate of UPN. It aired the network's shows outside of prime time. WGKI continued to air UPN programming until 2006, when UPN merged with The WB to form The CW, which had no intentions of maintaining secondary affiliations on existing network affiliates and chose to be on a subchannel of WGTU instead.

In 1999, the channel increased its ERP from 219 kW to 774 kW, significantly increasing its coverage area. In 2000, Knapp retired and sold his stations to Rockfleet Broadcasting for $12 million. Part of the deal called for both channels to change call letters. WGKI became WFQX-TV and WGKU became WFVX. In 2003, Rockfleet moved the WFVX call sign to a low-power station it had acquired in Bangor, Maine, and changed the Vanderbilt station's call letters to WFUP.

On February 10, 2007, WFQX upgraded its digital signal on UHF channel 47 (from a transmitter shared with WGTU east of Kalkaska) to begin airing all Fox programming in high definition for over-the-air viewers. (Prior to then, the station offered a low-power digital and HDTV signal near its studios southeast of Cadillac.) WFQX is available on Charter digital channel 783. On May 10, Rockfleet Broadcasting announced its intentions to sell WFQX/WFUP to Cadillac Telecasting. The Federal Communications Commission (FCC) approved the sale in late October. After this approval, the new owner entered into its SSA with Heritage Broadcasting Group.

It had been announced with the switch to digital broadcasting (then scheduled for February 17, 2009), WFUP would shut down. However, that channel had an application to perform a flash-cut to digital-only broadcasting on June 12. At one point, the station operated a digital signal on UHF channel 59 from its tower on Hudson Lookout. WFQX had an FCC-issued construction permit to air a digital signal on UHF channel 32 using the previous analog channel 33 equipment but based from the WWTV tower at its studios. That spot is the highest point in Michigan's Lower Peninsula.

On August 4, 2009, WFQX switched its longtime moniker "Fox 33" to "Fox 32" while adding a logo matching Fox owned-and-operated stations. The station made the channel move with its PSIP also being adjusted to match the new signal. WFUP's digital signal remained the same. The previous allotment is now used for WPBN-TV's digital broadcasts.

WFQX/WFUP are affiliates of the Detroit Lions Television Network which airs pre-season games and the weekly syndicated show The Ford Lions Report during the regular season. The station also airs all regular season NFL on Fox Lions games. WFQX and PBS member station WCMU-TV were the only stations in the Northern Michigan market that offered analog translator stations. There had been one on channel 31 in Alpena but this was shut down with WFUP serving the area.

At one point, WFQX operated a repeater on channel 40 in Traverse City. That signal was shut down with the addition of one on channel 54. This too has since been shut off. Two translators that served the eastern Upper Peninsula were replaced with digital signals on new digital subchannels of WWTV and WWUP. WFQX also operated a repeater in Alpena, W31BO on channel 31. This would be shut down in November 2009 when WBKB-TV added a new digital subchannel featuring primary Fox and secondary MyNetworkTV programming on 11.2.

In December 2017, WFQX-TV/WFUP rebranded from "Fox 32" to "Local 32". Despite the name change, the station remains a Fox affiliate.

== WFQX-DT2 ==
WFQX-DT2, branded on-air as Northern Michigan CW 32, is the CW+-affiliated second digital subchannel of WFQX-TV, broadcasting in 720p HD on channel 32.2.

=== History ===
What would become WFQX-DT2 began in 1998 as "WBVC", a WB affiliate. It was part of The WB 100+ which was a similar operation to the current CW Plus service. "WBVC" was identified on-air as "Northern Michigan's WB 61" and the call sign was used in a fictional manner because it only aired on cable. WGTU provided promotional and advertising services for "WBVC" which was based at the ABC affiliate's studios on East Front Street in Downtown Traverse City. Prior to the cable-only "WBVC", Northern Michigan received WB programming on cable from WGN-TV in Chicago, which carried the network's lineup nationally via its superstation feed until 1999.

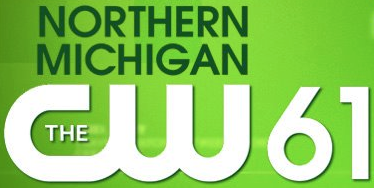
Former WFQX-DT2 logo, used under the fictitious "WBVC" call sign and "Northern Michigan's WB 61" branding, during its cable-exclusive years and also its days as WGTU-DT2

On January 24, 2006, Time Warner and CBS Corporation (the latter of which took over UPN after the split of Viacom into two companies occurred in December 2005) announced that they would shut down The WB and UPN in September 2006 and merge those two networks' resources to create The CW, a new television service whose initials represented the names of both of those respective companies. UPN aired in a delayed arrangement on Fox affiliates WFQX-TV/WFUP. On July 25, a new logo for "WBVC" appeared on WGTU's website. At that time, there were no announcements posted about its future as a CW affiliate. However, that changed a few weeks before the new network started. The CW began broadcasting on September 18. On that date, "WBVC" became known on-air as "Northern Michigan CW" and WFQX dropped its secondary affiliation with UPN. After the station was added to a new second digital subchannel of WGTU, it began to use the WGTU-DT2 call sign in an official manner.

On September 19, 2007, there was an application filed to the FCC by Max Media to sell WGTU to Tucker Broadcasting for $10 million. After approval in April 2008, Tucker entered into a shared services agreement with Barrington Broadcasting that resulted in WPBN operating WGTU. After the closing of the deal with Tucker Broadcasting, the CW subchannel went dark and the programming service became exclusively available via cable with no local affiliate selling advertising. It resumed using the fictitious "WBVC" call letters.

==== As WFQX-DT2 ====
In 2018, WFQX-DT2 had assumed the CW affiliation from the once cable-exclusive "WBVC", allowing over-the-air access to the network for the first time in 10 years, rebranding it as "Northern Michigan CW 32". By March 2020, the over-the-air feed of WFQX-DT2 was upgraded into 720p HD; it had been airing in the 16:9 widescreen standard definition picture format, before then.

== News operation ==
As WGKI, the station simulcast WKBD's hour-long prime time newscast at 10 o'clock. In June 2000, WFQX launched a news department of its own and began producing a nightly 10 o'clock broadcast. Known as Northern Michigan's Fox News at 10, this was plagued from the start by a lack of basic resources such as reporters and engineering upkeep. The station initially had its own weather department, but later began outsourcing weather duties to AccuWeather in State College, Pennsylvania, which pre-taped weather segments and fed them to WFQX via satellite. As a result, WFQX was criticized for being too late when severe weather was an issue or choosing not to cover an event. At some point in time, the news title changed to Fox 33 News at 10 and weekend broadcasts ended.

On January 8, 2007, WFQX began to air a simulcast of the weekday morning show of WJBK, Detroit's Fox owned-and-operated station. Branded as Michigan's Fox News Morning and running from 6 to 8 a.m., it featured local weather cut-ins from AccuWeather, and was established as part of a cooperation between the two stations to provide advertising opportunities in Detroit to businesses of Northern Michigan. On February 5, WFQX also began simulcasting the second half of WJBK's 10 p.m. news.

After the sale of the channel to Cadillac Telecasting, the station's news department was shut down. On October 31, WWTV began producing the weeknight 10 p.m. newscast and the WJBK simulcast at 10:30 p.m. was dropped. On January 7, 2008, when CBS began requiring affiliates to carry The Early Show in its entirety, the third hour of WWTV's Michigan This Morning, which had been running from 7 a.m. to 8 a.m., was moved to WFQX/WFUP and expanded to two hours. That evening on WFQX, WWTV launched the area's first 7 p.m. news. In April 2013, WFQX (along with sister station WWTV) began airing its newscasts in high definition.

=== Notable former on-air staff ===
- Jim Kosek – weeknights
- Brad Panovich – chief meteorologist (late 1990s)

== Technical information ==
The stations' signals are multiplexed:

=== WFQX subchannels ===
Subchannels of WFQX-TV
Channel	Res.	Short name	Programming
32.1	720p	WFQX-DT	Fox
32.2	720p	WFQX-CW	The CW Plus
32.3	480i	WFQX-IO	Ion
32.4	480i	WFQX-D4	Court TV
32.5	480i	WFQX-D5	Ion Mystery
32.6	480i	WFQX-D6	Ion Plus
32.7	480i	WFQX-D7	Bounce TV

=== WFUP subchannels ===
Subchannels of WFUP
Channel	Res.	Short name	Programming
45.1	720p	WFUP-FX	Fox
45.2	1080i	WFUP-CB	CBS (WWTV/WWUP-TV)
45.3	480i	WFUP-ME	MeTV
45.4	480i	WFUP-LA	Laff
45.5	480i	WFUP-QV	QVC
45.6	480i	WFUP-HS	HSN
45.7	480i	WFUP-D7	Grit

Simulcast of subchannels of another station

== See also ==
- Channel 21 digital TV stations in the United States
- Channel 32 digital TV stations in the United States
- Channel 32 virtual TV stations in the United States
- Channel 45 virtual TV stations in the United States
- WFVX-LD
- WJFW-TV
- WVII-TV
