= Channel 32 virtual TV stations in the United States =

Television stations

The following television stations operate on virtual channel 32 in the United States:

- K15IX-D in Rainier, Oregon
- K16MU-D in Scipio, Utah
- K18DR-D in Cortez, etc., Colorado
- K18MW-D in Leamington, Utah
- K18NQ-D in Rhinelander, Wisconsin
- K21KE-D in Canyonville, Oregon
- K31GN-D in La Grande, Oregon
- K31HK-D in Rainier, Oregon
- K31ON-D in Fillmore, etc., Utah
- K32EB-D in Alexandria, Minnesota
- K32EM-D in Morongo Valley, California
- K32FW-D in Pierre, South Dakota
- K32GB-D in Agana, Guam
- K32JQ-D in Manhattan, Kansas
- K32JT-D in Farmington, New Mexico
- K32JU-D in Tampico, etc., Montana
- K32JW-D in Fillmore, etc., Utah
- K32KT-D in Wichita Falls, Texas
- K32KY-D in Pasco, Washington
- K32LO-D in Prescott, Arizona
- K32OG-D in Pueblo, Colorado
- K34QY-D in Golden Valley, Arizona
- KAZQ in Albuquerque, New Mexico
- KBFD-DT in Honolulu, Hawaii
- KBIN-TV in Council Bluffs, Iowa
- KDYS-LD in Spokane, Washington
- KEHO-LD in Houston, Texas
- KFAW-LD in Midland, Texas
- KFKK-LD in Stockton, California
- KGCH-LD in Lake Charles, Louisiana
- KJOI-LD in Bakersfield, California
- KJTV-CD in Wolfforth, Texas
- KMTP-TV in San Francisco, California
- KMYN-LD in Duluth, Minnesota
- KQKC-LD in Topeka, Kansas
- KRCW-TV in Salem, Oregon
- KRIN in Waterloo, Iowa
- KRMS-LD in Lake Ozark, Missouri
- KSBT-LD in Santa Barbara, California
- KSTV-LD in Sacramento, California
- KTAB-TV in Abilene, Texas
- KTFV-CD in McAllen, Texas
- KUTH-DT in Provo, Utah
- KWSM-LD in Santa Maria, California
- KXKW-LD in Lafayette, Louisiana
- KYPK-LD in Yakima, Washington
- W17EA-D in Arroyo, Puerto Rico
- W18FC-D in Florence, South Carolina
- W19EM-D in Melbourne, Florida
- W24EX-D in Florence, South Carolina
- W32DH-D in Erie, Pennsylvania
- W33EG-D in Lumberton, Mississippi
- W32EI-D in Port Jervis, New York
- W32EQ-D in Tuscaloosa, Alabama
- W32EW-D in Roanoke, Virginia
- W32FK-D in Valdosta, Georgia
- W32FN-D in Macon, Georgia
- W32FS-D in Bangor, Maine
- W32FY-D in Clarksburg, West Virginia
- W35ED-D in Florence, South Carolina
- WACY-TV in Appleton, Wisconsin
- WANN-CD in Atlanta, Georgia
- WCSN-LD in Columbus, Ohio
- WDOX-LD in Palm Beach, Florida
- WELU in Aguadilla, Puerto Rico
- WFLD in Chicago, Illinois
- WFQX-TV in Cadillac, Michigan
- WGDV-LD in Salisbury, Maryland
- WGTA in Toccoa, Georgia
- WHDN-CD in Naples, Florida
- WHDS-LD in Savannah, Georgia
- WHUT-TV in Washington, D.C.
- WLAE-TV in New Orleans, Louisiana
- WLKY in Louisville, Kentucky
- WMBF-TV in Myrtle Beach, South Carolina
- WMOR-TV in Lakeland, Florida
- WNCF in Montgomery, Alabama
- WNDR-LD in Auburn, New York
- WRAP-LD in Cleveland, Ohio
- WRNT-LD in Hartford, Connecticut
- WWHL-LD in Nashville, Tennessee
- WXNY-LD in New York, New York

The following station, which is no longer licensed, formerly operated on virtual channel 32:

- K04RA-D in Clarksville, Arkansas
- K32DR-D in Granite Falls, Minnesota
- K32EL-D in Shoshoni, Wyoming
- K32JE-D in Quincy, Washington
- K32JG-D in Rapid City, South Dakota
- K32JJ-D in Rolla, Missouri
- K32JK-D in Boise, Idaho
- K32JM-D in Twin Falls, Idaho
- KCLG-LD in Neosho, Missouri
- KRCW-LP in Portland, Oregon
- KYWF-LD in Wichita Falls, Texas
- W32DU-D in La Grange, Georgia
- WNAL-LD in Scottsboro, Alabama
- WNYX-LD in New York, New York
- WUEA-LD in Lafayette, Indiana
