= WWTV =

Television station in Cadillac, Michigan

WWTV and WWUP-TV

WWTV: Cadillac–Traverse City, Michigan; WWUP-TV: Sault Ste. Marie, Michigan; United States
- Channels for WWTV: Digital: 9 (VHF); Virtual: 9
- Channels for WWUP-TV: Digital: 10 (VHF); Virtual: 10
- Branding: 9&10 News; Local 32 (9.2/10.2); MeTV Northern Michigan (9.3/10.3)

Programming
- Affiliations: 9.1/10.1: CBS; 9.2/10.2: Fox; for others, see § Subchannels

Ownership
- Owner: 910 Media Group; (Heritage Broadcasting Company of Michigan)
- Sister stations: WFQX-TV, WFUP

History
- First air date: WWTV: January 1, 1954; WWUP-TV: June 15, 1962
- Former channel number: WWTV: Analog: 13 (VHF, 1954–1962), 9 (VHF, 1962–2009); Digital: 40 (UHF, 2007–2009); WWUP-TV: Analog: 10 (VHF, 1962–2009); Digital: 49 (UHF, 2007–2009)
- Former affiliations: WWTV: ABC (secondary, 1954–1971); DuMont (secondary, 1954–1956); CW+ (9.4, until 2020); WWUP-TV: ABC (secondary, 1962–1971); CW+ (10.4, until 2020)
- Call sign meaning: WWTV: Water Wonderland Television; WWUP-TV: Water Wonderland's Upper Peninsula

Technical information
- Licensing authority: FCC
- Facility ID: WWTV: 26994; WWUP-TV: 26993
- ERP: WWTV: 45 kW; WWUP-TV: 25 kW
- HAAT: WWTV: 497 m (1,631 ft); WWUP-TV: 370 m (1,214 ft)
- Transmitter coordinates: WWTV: 44°8′12″N 85°20′33″W; WWUP-TV: 46°3′36″N 84°5′57″W
- Translators: 25 (UHF) Traverse City; WFUP 45.2 Vanderbilt

Links
- Public license information: WWTV: Public file; LMS; WWUP-TV: Public file; LMS
- Website: www.9and10news.com

WWTV (channel 9) in Cadillac, Michigan, and WWUP-TV (channel 10) in Sault Ste. Marie, Michigan, collectively branded as 9&10, are television stations serving as the CBS affiliates for Northern Michigan. They are owned by Heritage Broadcasting Company (doing business as 910 Media Group), which provides certain services to Cadillac-licensed dual Fox/CW+ affiliate WFQX-TV, channel 32 (and its Vanderbilt-licensed full-time satellite, WFUP, channel 45) under a shared services agreement (SSA) with Cadillac Telecasting. The stations share studios on Cass Street in downtown Traverse City; WWTV's transmitter is located on 130th Avenue northeast of Tustin, while WWUP's tower is near Goetzville, Michigan.

WWUP operates as a full-time satellite of WWTV; aside from the transmitter, it does not maintain any physical presence in Sault Ste. Marie, Michigan. Together, the two stations serve the largest television market east of the Mississippi River, covering 23 counties in the northern Lower Peninsula and three counties in the eastern Upper Peninsula. In addition, WWUP's signal can be received by viewers in Northern Ontario including Sault Ste. Marie's Canadian sister city.

== History ==
Sparton Corporation, a Jackson-based radio manufacturer, won the license for channel 13 in June 1953 was assigned the call letters WWTV. In November 1953, Sparton sent advertising agents and "queens" to New York to drum up advertising by tell the "Northern Michigan Story" with programming expected to start on December 15. Delays pushed back the on-air date to January 1954, though it began airing regular test patterns on December 13, 1953.

WWTV began broadcasting on New Year's Day in 1954. It was Michigan's first television station north of Lansing, predating Traverse City's WPBN-TV (channel 7) by several months. WWTV has been a CBS affiliate from its first day, but initially carried secondary affiliations with ABC and DuMont (the latter shut down in 1956). When WPBN signed on, WWTV shared ABC programming with that station until 1971, when WGTU (channel 29) signed on and became the area's ABC affiliate. WWTV aired some of ABC's soap operas and game shows while WPBN aired ABC's sports programming on the weekends.

In 1958, broadcast pioneer John Fetzer purchased WWTV. Fetzer also owned the Detroit Tigers, and the purchase brought Tigers games to Northern Michigan for the first time. In 1961, a fire at the station's transmitter spread to the studio and destroyed the building. The building was quickly rebuilt, complete with new equipment. In 1962, WWTV swapped channel locations with WZZM in Grand Rapids and moved to its current location on channel 9. The move to channel 9 allowed WWTV to boost its broadcasting power to cover the entire northern half of the Lower Peninsula. On June 15 of that year, Fetzer signed on WWUP in Sault Ste. Marie as a full-time satellite of WWTV. From 1962 to around 1998, the stations branded collectively as "TV 9&10"; since 1998, they have been known as "9&10 News".

In 1967, WWTV/WWUP broadcast in color for the first time (as CBS was the last network to convert to all-color broadcasting). In 1979, Fetzer sold WWTV/WWUP to Buffalo Bills owner Ralph Wilson. In 1986, the stations were sold to Heritage Broadcast Group, headed by Detroiter Mario Iacobelli. WWTV/WWUP has long been one of the most technologically advanced small-market television stations in the country.

On May 10, 2007, it was announced that the area's Fox affiliate, WFQX-TV, was being sold by Rockfleet Broadcasting to Cadillac Telecasting. The Federal Communications Commission (FCC) gave regulatory approval in late October of that year. After the closing of the sale, Cadillac Telecasting entered into a shared services agreement (SSA) with WWTV and WWUP.

On June 12, 2009, WWTV and WWUP turned off their analog signals and moved their digital signals to the previous analog channels. On September 29, 2010, the FCC granted WWTV a construction permit for a digital fill-in translator on their pre-transition channel 40. This translator will primarily serve the few parts of the Traverse City area that could no longer watch the main signal on channel 9 over the air. This repeater began operation on December 1, 2011. However, few viewers actually lost access to CBS programming due to the very high penetration of cable and satellite, which are all but essential for acceptable television in this vast market.

In February 2017, the station moved its studios and offices from its transmitter location near Tustin to a renovated office building near US 131) in Cadillac; the street near the building was renamed Broadcast Way. For 63 years, ice forming on the tower had been the bane of WWTV's existence. Chunks fell off during ice thaws, as large as small cars at times, and staffers' vehicles were frequently smashed. On the night of August 30, 2018, the 1961 building caught fire and was destroyed, also compromising the transmitter portion of the building and forcing the station to scramble to bring its over-the-air and pay-TV signals back online in some form. It took a couple of days for the channel to be available again to cable TV and satellite customers. Streaming video of local newscasts is available. The broadcast signal was restored in early September at reduced power until a new transmitter was installed.

In 2025, WWTV moved most of its operations to an office suite in Traverse City, while selling the Cadillac studio to the Wexford-Missaukee Intermediate School District. Master control moved to a smaller building in Cadillac, 48 mi (77 km) south of Traverse City. According to operations manager Ben Scripps, the Cadillac studio was too large and too expensive to maintain. Key Code Media overhauled WWTV's technical operation so one person could do the work of three people.

== News operation ==
WWTV/WWUP has long been the highest-rated television station in the market, and has always been well ahead of distant runner up WPBN/WTOM in the Nielsen ratings. This is mainly because its newscasts focus on the entire region, while WPBN/WTOM focuses mostly on Traverse City. The station's various owners have always devoted significant resources to its news department, resulting in a higher-quality product than conventional wisdom would suggest for what has always been a very small market. Currently, WWTV/WWUP produces and airs 42 hours of news every week, a very large amount for a station in the 120th market.

One of the station's best-known faces is John McGowan, who joined the station's on-air roster in 1977, and remained a station personality for 37 years, until suffering a stroke in 2014. McGowan served as sports director and anchor, and later served as the lead anchor on the station's weekend newscasts. The longest serving on-air personality currently with WWTV/WWUP is Michael Stevens, who was morning meteorologist on Michigan This Morning from 2010 until 2021; he was promoted to chief meteorologist in 2024. Other WWTV/WWUP alumni include WTVG weatherman Bill Spencer (retired in 2017), Jeopardy! "Clue Crew" member Sarah Whitcomb Foss, WOOD-TV reporters Larry Figurski and Dee Morrison, and former KPSP anchor Trish O'Shea.

WWTV/WWUP courted controversy when it polled viewers asking if they wanted the station to air a CBS special about the career of CBS Evening News anchor Dan Rather, who was stepping down from his broadcast. After much attention from both local and national press, the poll was dropped and the special was aired.

On October 31, 2007, WWTV/WWUP began producing a weeknight 10 o'clock newscast on new sister station WFQX. On January 7, 2008, CBS began requiring affiliates to carry The Early Show in its entirety. The third hour of Michigan This Morning, which had been running from 7 to 8 in the morning, was moved to WFQX and expanded to two hours. That evening on WFQX, WWTV/WWUP launched the market's first 7 o'clock newscast. In April 2013, WWTV and WFQX became the only television stations in the market to broadcast news in High Definition.

In addition to its main studios, WWTV/WWUP operates a news bureau in Petoskey. Before moving most of its operations to Traverse City, it also operated a Traverse City bureau on Aero Park Drive near Cherry Capital Airport. During its weather forecasts, WWTV/WWUP uses live, NOAA National Weather Service radar data from several regional sites. This data is presented on-screen as the "Doppler 9&10 Radar Network". The main signal comes from the radar located at the NWS Local Forecast Office in Gaylord. Mondays through Thursdays after the 11 o'clock news, the station airs Sports Extra, an extended sportscast. During high school sports season, Friday night 11 o'clock newscasts devote over 20 minutes to Sports Overtime. Known as "the original big show", it regularly features highlights from more than a dozen area high school sporting events and has won numerous awards for the station. 9&10's website features video content from news and sports.

== Technical information ==
=== Subchannels ===
The stations' signals are multiplexed:

Subchannels of WWTV and WWUP-TV
Channel		Res.	Short name		Programming
WWTV	WWUP-TV	Res.	WWTV	WWUP-TV	Programming
9.1	10.1	1080i	WWTV-HD	WWUP-HD	CBS
9.2	10.2	720p	WFQX-DT		Fox (WFQX-TV)
9.3	10.3	480i	WWTV-ME	WWUP-ME	MeTV
9.4	10.4	480i	WWTV-LA	WWUP-LA	Laff
9.5	10.5	480i	WWTV-D5	WWUP-D5	QVC
9.6	10.6	480i	WWTV-HS	WWUP-HS	HSN
9.7	10.7	480i	WWTV-D7	WWUP-DT7	Grit

Simulcast of subchannels of another station

=== Translator ===
- WWTV (DRT) 25 Cadillac

== See also ==
- Channel 9 digital TV stations in the United States
- Channel 9 virtual TV stations in the United States
- Channel 10 digital TV stations in the United States
- Channel 10 virtual TV stations in the United States
