= WGTU =

Television station in Traverse City, Michigan

WGTU and WGTQ

WGTU: Traverse City–Cadillac, Michigan; WGTQ: Sault Ste. Marie, Michigan; United States
- Channels for WGTU: Digital: 29 (UHF); Virtual: 29
- Channels for WGTQ: Digital: 8 (VHF); Virtual: 8
- Branding: ABC 29&8 (general); UpNorthLive News on ABC 29&8 (newscasts); TV 7&4 (29.2/8.2)

Programming
- Affiliations: 29.1/8.1: ABC; 29.2/8.2: NBC; for others, see § Subchannels

Ownership
- Owner: Sinclair Broadcast Group; (WGTU Licensee, LLC)
- Sister stations: WPBN-TV / WTOM-TV

History
- First air date: WGTU: August 18, 1971; WGTQ: October 29, 1976
- Former channel number: WGTU: Analog: 29 (UHF, 1971–2009); Digital: 31 (UHF, until 2009); WGTQ: Analog: 8 (VHF, 1976–2009); Digital: 9 (VHF, until 2009)
- Former affiliations: CW+ (29.2/8.2, 2006−2009); Comet (29.2/8.2, 2015–2021)
- Call sign meaning: WGTU: Grand Traverse UHF; WGTQ: Disambiguation of WGTU

Technical information
- Licensing authority: FCC
- Facility ID: WGTU: 59280; WGTQ: 59279
- ERP: WGTU: 68.4 kW; WGTQ: 15 kW
- HAAT: WGTU: 393 m (1,289 ft); WGTQ: 288 m (945 ft)
- Transmitter coordinates: WGTU: 44°44′53″N 85°4′8″W; WGTQ: 46°3′8″N 84°6′38″W
- Translators: WPBN-TV 7.2 Traverse City; WTOM-TV 4.2 Cheboygan

Links
- Public license information: WGTU: Public file; LMS; WGTQ: Public file; LMS
- Website: upnorthlive.com

WGTU (channel 29) in Traverse City, Michigan, and WGTQ (channel 8) in Sault Ste. Marie, Michigan, collectively branded ABC 29&8, are television stations serving as the ABC affiliates for the northern Lower and eastern Upper peninsulas of Michigan. They are owned by Sinclair Broadcast Group, alongside NBC affiliates WPBN-TV and WTOM-TV. The stations share studios on M-72 just west of Traverse City; WGTU's transmitter is located east of Kalkaska, Michigan, and WGTQ's transmitter is near Goetzville in southeastern Chippewa County, in addition to simulcasts on WPBN-TV and WTOM-TV's transmitters. The two stations, together known with WPBN/WTOM as "UpNorthLive", carry the same programming and serve one of the largest television markets east of the Mississippi River.

WGTU went on the air in 1970 and provided full ABC network service to Traverse City for the first time; WGTQ followed in 1976. Prior to WPBN/WTOM taking over many operational functions for WGTU/WGTQ in 2007, the stations aired very little local programming, with two attempts at full local newscasts having failed to garner ratings. The UpNorthLive newsroom produces one dedicated local newscast for WGTU/WGTQ.

== History ==
On February 25, 1970, Northern Entertainment, Inc., headed by Thomas W. Kiple, applied to the Federal Communications Commission (FCC) to construct a new television station on channel 29 in Traverse City. A permit was issued on August 5, and construction began nearly immediately on the new station's facility.

Work on the transmitter facilities near Kalkaska took place that spring, and the station began broadcasting as an ABC affiliate on August 18, 1971. As the market would not be served by its own PBS member station over-the-air until WCMU-TV launched Manistee and Cadillac satellite stations in 1984, it also aired Sesame Street at launch. Because the station was on UHF and was the northern part of the state's first full-power station on that band, cable providers had concerns about the station's picture quality, and for two years, WGTU and the Great Lakes Cable system in Petoskey feuded over the latter refusing to invoke network non-duplication protection with the signal of competing ABC outlet WJRT in Flint, Michigan; the two parties settled the dispute, which primarily centered on picture quality, in 1973.

To extend WGTU's service area, Northern Entertainment filed in 1973 to build channel 8 in Sault Ste. Marie as a satellite of WGTU; the FCC approved this application over a competing bid from Sault Ste. Marie Broadcasting in 1975. WGTQ went into service on October 29, 1976, broadcasting to a binational region where ABC programming had only been available previously on cable. In addition, a channel 55 translator station for WGTU was built in Alpena, though by the late 1980s it had been withdrawn with the rise of cable in the area.

While the Sault Ste. Marie application remained pending at the FCC, labor problems developed in Traverse City. On March 1, 1975, a NABET local went on strike at WGTU after multiple bargaining sessions failed to produce a resolution on issues including overtime, jurisdiction, travel compensation for engineers to the transmitter, and wages. Management personnel kept the station in operation during this time, while union members urged advertisers and viewers to boycott it. One Detroit job-seeker responded to a classified ad placed by WGTU in a newspaper there only to learn that the station was on strike. The strike lasted three months, and before year's end, the union and station agreed to a contract.

In 1978, Michigan Television Network—the renamed Northern Entertainment—filed to sell WGTU and WGTQ to Panax Television for $925,000. The deal attracted attention because of other dealings involving the 40 percent owner of Panax: John McGoff, a newspaper publisher that was being investigated by the United States Department of Justice for links to the apartheid-era government of South Africa before American sanctions were placed on the country in the 1980s. Despite this, the FCC Broadcast Bureau approved the transaction, and ownership was transferred for a short time, but citing the pending investigation into McGoff, the commission vacated the ruling on a 6–0 vote. As a result, the parties abandoned the proposed sale. Three years later, WGTU-WGTQ would be sold to Center Group Broadcasting for $1.8 million.

WGTU was acquired in 1993 by Scanlan Communications; Max Media purchased it from Scanlan in 2003. In 1998, the station began to provide promotional and advertising services for cable-only The WB affiliate "WBVC", part of The WB 100+ Station Group. This service became a digital subchannel of WGTU in 2006 when The WB made way for The CW. In early November 2006, WGTU/WGTQ began to offer ABC programming in high definition.

On September 19, 2007, an application was filed to the Federal Communications Commission (FCC) by Max Media to sell WGTU/WGTQ to Tucker Broadcasting for $10 million. After FCC approval, Tucker entered into joint sales and shared services agreements with Barrington Broadcasting for WPBN/WTOM to provide advertising. According to the FCC filing, WPBN/WTOM would sell advertising time and provide other programming for WGTU/WGTQ. The sale was approved in April 2008, and that summer, WGTU/WGTQ merged operations into the WPBN-TV Traverse City facility.

On June 12, 2009, WGTU/WGTQ flash cut their digital signals onto their original analog allocations, moving the former from adjacent and temporary digital channels during the digital transition. At the same time, both stations began to simulcast WPBN/WTOM on their second subchannels to provide maximum coverage of both station pairs throughout the market, with WPBN/WTOM also carrying WGTU/WGTQ on their second subchannels. Because of this, "WBVC" was dropped from WGTU/WGTQ due to digital multiplexer limitations of the time which did not allow three high-definition channels on the same spectrum. The CW thus became cable-exclusive in the market until 2018, when WWTV/WWUP-TV began to broadcast it over a subchannel of its operations partner, Fox affiliate WFQX-TV.

On February 28, 2013, Barrington announced that it would sell its entire group, including WPBN/WTOM, to Sinclair Broadcast Group. At the same time, WGTU/WGTQ were acquired by Cunningham Broadcasting. Sinclair also acquired the local marketing agreement (LMA) with WGTU/WGTQ; almost all of Cunningham's stations are operated by Sinclair under LMAs. The sale was completed on November 25. Nearly all of Cunningham's stock is held by trusts for the Smith family, founders and owners of Sinclair. Thus, for all intents and purposes, Sinclair owns both stations. Cunningham, previously known as Glencairn, has long been used as a shell corporation to allow Sinclair to operate duopolies where Sinclair cannot legally own them.

Sinclair filed to buy WGTU outright from Cunningham in August 2025, following a decision by the United States Court of Appeals for the Eighth Circuit that struck down limitations on ownership of two of the four highest-rated TV stations in a market. The sale was completed on March 1, 2026.

== Newscasts ==
WGTU presently carries 6 hours, 35 minutes of locally produced newscasts seven days a week, at 6:30 p.m. weekdays, and 11 p.m. nightly. It also simulcasts WPBN/WTOM's Today local news and weather cut-ins as part of Good Morning America.

=== News department history ===
WGTU initially had a full-fledged news department. However, it made little headway against WWTV and WPBN and was cut back severely to news "capsules" in 1975. After another attempt at local news in 1982 under Michigan Center, the news department was dropped in 1984. For more than a quarter-century, it aired almost no local, full newscasts. The only local news on the station were weekday morning news, weather, and sports cut-ins at :25 and :55 past the hour during Good Morning America as well as a ten-minute news and weather update seen weeknights at 11 p.m.

After WGTU consolidated its operations with WPBN, it became possible that a full-fledged local newscast would return to WGTU. On September 13, 2010, that station finally took advantage of this channel being housed in the same facility and launched a weeknight newscast at 6:30 p.m. on WGTU, known as UpNorthLive News. The news/weather update seen weeknights at 11 p.m. remained as well but was taped in advance as was the case before WGTU merged with WPBN.

== Subchannels ==
The stations' signals are multiplexed:

Subchannels of WGTU and WGTQ
Subchannel		Res.	Short name	Programming
WGTU	WGTQ	Res.	Short name	Programming
29.1	8.1	720p	ABC	ABC
29.2	8.2	1080i	NBC	NBC (WPBN-TV/WTOM-TV)
29.3	8.3	480i	Charge!	Charge!
29.4	8.4	480i	ROAR	Roar

Simulcast of subchannels of another station
