= USDTV =

Over-the-air pay television service in the United States

U.S. Digital Television, LLC (6/2003 - 7/2006) USDigital Inc. (7/2006-5/2007)
- Company type: Subsidiary corporation; formerly: LLC
- Industry: Broadcasting
- Founded: Draper, Utah (June 2003)
- Founder: Steve Lindsley
- Defunct: May 2007
- Fate: Bankrupt
- Headquarters: Draper, Utah, USA
- Area served: Salt Lake City, Utah, Albuquerque, New Mexico, Las Vegas, Nevada, and Dallas, Texas
- Key people: Steven Lindsley (chairman and CEO)
- Products: Digital television receivers/box devices
- Brands: USDIGITAL
- Services: Over-the-air pay TV
- Parent: USDTV (28.28%); Hearst-Argyle; LIN Television Corp. McGraw-Hill Ventures Inc. News-USDTV Holdings Inc. Telcom DTV LLC(09/2005-2006) NexGen Telecom (9/2006-5/2007)
- Website: usdtv.com archived

USDTV, an acronym for U.S. Digital Television, was an over-the-air, pay television service in the United States. Based in Draper, Utah near Salt Lake City, it was founded in 2003 and started service there in 2004. The company ceased operations March 12, 2007.

USDTV leased subchannel space from local TV stations for its subscription TV service. USDTV ended services in 2007.

== History ==
U.S. Digital Television was formed in June 2003 by Steve Lindsley (founder of the former interactive service WOW-TV) and launched its service as a test in Salt Lake City near the end of 2003. By January 2004, it had received an order from Chinese company Hisense to supply the company with 100,000 set-top-boxes. On March 16, 2004, 1000 subscribers signed up with no advertising. US Digital also launched into the Albuquerque, New Mexico, market. The service's commercial launch was held in New York on March 16, 2004. At that time, the company expected to enter the Las Vegas market next and an additional 30 markets by the end of the year. By September, it had surpassed 10,000 subscribers. In the fourth quarter 2004, fifth-generation chips and ATSC tuners would be supplied by LG for USDTV tuners and would be available. At the time, USDTV was marketed as "The Low Cost Alternative to Cable".

In September 2005, Hearst-Argyle Television, McGraw-Hill Companies, News Corp.'s Fox Television Stations, LIN TV, and Morgan-Murphy Stations broadcasters invested $26 million in the company. Steven Lindsley indicated that the investing broadcasting companies did not think that the service would be able to compete against the cable companies, thus withdrawing support from USDTV.

On July 6, 2006, in Delaware Bankruptcy Court, the company filed for Chapter 7. While USDTV filed for liquidation bankruptcy, the company continued to operate in its four markets while two other companies were interested in purchasing its assets to continue the service. Investors at bankruptcy were USDTV (28.28%), and those with 12.35% each: Hearst-Argyle (split between HATV Investments Inc. and Hearst Broadcasting), LIN Television Corp., McGraw-Hill Ventures Inc., News-USDTV Holdings Inc. and Telcom DTV LLC. The company was placed under the control of a trustee, Alfred Thomas Giuliano.

In September 2006, NexGen Telecom, an original investor, purchased the assets of the company for a reported $1 million cash. NexGen had a major loss in another investment in fourth quarter 2006 forcing them to curtail their ongoing investment in USDTV. When no new bridge funding could be found, US Digital ended services in March 2007.

== Services ==
USDTV served customers in and near Salt Lake City, Utah, Albuquerque, New Mexico, Las Vegas, Nevada, and Dallas, Texas.

The company used extra bandwidth on digital television stations to send channels to subscribers who had a special set-top box digital tuner (USDIGITAL) provided by the company and an attic- or roof-mounted antenna which were available nationwide via Walmart and in the West by RC Willey furniture and electronics stores. The USDIGITAL brand boxes sold where the service was not available operated like an ordinary digital television tuner. Two technology companies, eWest and ServicePower, partnered to help clients install the equipment while self-installers would get two months free.

The cost for the basic-tier service was $19.95 per month. USDTV also offered Starz! for an additional monthly fee. The basic tier started out with 11 cable channels: ESPN, ESPN2, Disney Channel, Toon Disney, Discovery Channel, TLC, Lifetime, Lifetime Movie Network, Home & Gardening Television, Fox News, and the Food Network. By July 2003, the service had 30 channels. It also had plans to expand its cable line-up beyond the initial offer of 10 paid networks.
