= WPBN-TV =

Television station in Traverse City, Michigan

WPBN-TV and WTOM-TV

WPBN-TV: Traverse City–Cadillac, Michigan; WTOM-TV: Cheboygan, Michigan; United States
- Channels for WPBN-TV: Digital: 35 (UHF); Virtual: 7
- Channels for WTOM-TV: Digital: 16 (UHF); Virtual: 4
- Branding: TV 7&4 (general); UpNorthLive News on TV 7&4 (newscasts); ABC 29&8 (7.2/4.2)

Programming
- Affiliations: 7.1/4.1: NBC; 7.2/4.2: ABC; for others, see § Subchannels

Ownership
- Owner: Sinclair Broadcast Group; (WPBN Licensee, LLC)
- Sister stations: WGTU/WGTQ

History
- First air date: WPBN-TV: September 13, 1954; WTOM-TV: May 16, 1959
- Former call signs: WTOM-TV: WBDG-TV (CP, 1958–1959)
- Former channel number: WPBN-TV: Analog: 7 (VHF, 1954–2009); Digital: 47 (UHF, until 2019); WTOM-TV: Analog: 4 (VHF, 1959–2009); Digital: 35 (UHF, until 2019)
- Former affiliations: WPBN-TV: ABC (secondary, 1954–1971); WTOM-TV: ABC (secondary, 1959–1971)
- Call sign meaning: WPBN-TV: Paul Bunyan Network; WTOM-TV: Top of Michigan

Technical information
- Licensing authority: FCC
- Facility ID: WPBN-TV: 21253; WTOM-TV: 21254
- ERP: WPBN-TV: 850 kW; WTOM-TV: 250 kW
- HAAT: WPBN-TV: 393 m (1,289 ft); WTOM-TV: 194 m (636 ft)
- Transmitter coordinates: WPBN-TV: 44°44′53″N 85°4′8″W; WTOM-TV: 45°39′1″N 84°20′37″W
- Translators: 22 (UHF) Harrietta; WGTU 29.2 Traverse City; WGTQ 8.2 Sault Ste. Marie

Links
- Public license information: WPBN-TV: Public file; LMS; WTOM-TV: Public file; LMS
- Website: upnorthlive.com

WPBN-TV (channel 7) in Traverse City, Michigan, and WTOM-TV (channel 4) in Cheboygan, Michigan, collectively branded TV 7&4, are television stations serving as the NBC affiliates for the northern Lower and eastern Upper peninsulas of Michigan. They are owned by Sinclair Broadcast Group alongside regional ABC affiliates WGTU and WGTQ. The stations share studios on M-72 just west of Traverse City; WPBN-TV's transmitter is located east of Kalkaska, Michigan, and WTOM-TV's transmitter is on US 23 east of Cheboygan, in addition to simulcasts on WGTU and WGTQ's transmitters.

The two stations, known together with WGTU/WGTQ as "UpNorthLive", carry the same programming and serves one of the largest television markets east of the Mississippi River: 23 counties in the Northern Lower Peninsula, three counties in the Eastern Upper Peninsula, and portions of Northern Ontario including Sault Ste. Marie, Ontario. However, WTOM has not been available in Canada on cable since the early 2000s when Shaw Communications replaced it with Detroit's WDIV-TV (channel 4). Until January 25, 2022, when CBS affiliate WBKB-TV affiliated its second subchannel with NBC, WTOM also served as the default NBC affiliate for Alpena, and was dropped by Charter Spectrum systems in the Alpena market on May 1.

== History ==
WPBN-TV began broadcasting on September 13, 1954, airing an analog signal on VHF channel 7. It was owned by the Biederman family and their company, Midwest Broadcasting, along with WTCM (1400 AM, now 580). Company president Les Biederman had signed on WTCM, Northern Michigan's oldest radio station, in 1940. Over the next decade, he bought or signed-on several other AM stations throughout the area. These were known as the "Paul Bunyan Network," with WTCM as the flagship station. Since channel 7 covered much of the territory covered by the radio stations, Biederman decided not to call his new station WTCM-TV (for Traverse City, Michigan) but rather WPBN-TV (for Paul Bunyan Network).

In the 1950s, the Federal Communications Commission (FCC) collapsed the eastern half of the Upper Peninsula into the Traverse City–Cadillac market. At the time, the only television station in that area had been private CBC affiliate CJIC-TV. Since WPBN was already operating at the maximum power allowed, Biederman signed-on WTOM-TV in Cheboygan on May 16, 1959. WTOM was the first American television station that could be received in the Eastern Upper Peninsula, although Cheboygan is actually in the northernmost part of the Lower Peninsula. Since then, the two stations have been known collectively as 7&4.

Until 1971, it shared ABC programming with CBS affiliates WWTV/WWUP. WPBN aired ABC's sports programming on the weekends while WWTV aired some of the network's game shows and soap operas. In 1971, WGTU signed-on and took the ABC affiliation. In 1980, Midwest Broadcasting wanted to expand its broadcast operations in Northern Michigan. However, the FCC told the family that they could do so only if they sold some stations to stay under ownership limits. One of the stations sold off was WPBN/WTOM (which count as one station for ratings and regulatory purposes), which went to U.S. Tobacco.

U.S. Tobacco owned the station until 1986, at which time sold to Beam Communications. Beam owned the station until 1990, and then sold to Federal Broadcasting Company.

From 1999 to 2005, it was owned by Raycom Media. In late 2005, following that company's purchase of the Liberty Corporation, Raycom announced that WPBN would be sold along with another NBC affiliate in the Upper Peninsula, WLUC-TV in Marquette. The sale was necessary to help meet FCC restrictions on station ownership. On March 27, 2006, Raycom announced that Barrington Broadcasting would acquire twelve Raycom stations, including WPBN. The FCC approved the deal in June 2006 and the finalization took place on August 12. At that point, the station joined WLUC, Saginaw's NBC affiliate WEYI-TV and (to a degree) Toledo, Ohio's NBC affiliate WNWO-TV as part of Barrington's family of stations in and around Michigan.

On September 19, 2007, an application was filed to the FCC by Max Media to sell WGTU, its full-time satellite WGTQ, and CW cable station to Tucker Broadcasting for $10 million. After approval, that company entered into a shared services agreement with Barrington. According to the FCC filing, WPBN would sell advertising time and provides other programming for Tucker's stations. The combined operation was based at WPBN's studios, which were renovated over the summer to accommodate the change. WPBN and WGTU began to share a website as well. For the digital transition on June 12, 2009, WPBN filed a petition with the FCC move its Traverse City digital signal on UHF channel 50 to the analog tower in Harrietta to maintain coverage in that area. It then signed-on a new digital signal on UHF channel 47 from WGTU's tower in Kalkaska.

Unlike WPBN, WTOM-DT on UHF channel 35 did not initially offer NBC programming in full high definition. Instead, the signal was transmitted in an unconverted format. A true high definition signal for that station was included once WTOM shut down its analog signal on the transition date. Its new digital signal covers a fraction of the area once served by the VHF analog signal due to the rather low-powered 78 kW digital signal on UHF. Notably, it no longer reached Sault Ste. Marie. To make up for this shortfall in coverage, standard definition feeds of WPBN and WTOM were added to the digital subcarriers of WGTU and WGTQ respectively; these were later upgraded to high definition.

On February 28, 2013, Barrington Broadcasting announced the sale of its entire group, including WPBN/WTOM, to Sinclair Broadcast Group. Sinclair also acquired the LMA for WGTU/WGTQ, which was sold to Cunningham Broadcasting. The sale was completed on November 25. Nearly all of Cunningham's stock is held by trusts for the Smith family, founders and owners of Sinclair. Thus, for all intents and purposes, Sinclair owns both stations. Cunningham, previously known as Glencairn, has long been used as a shell corporation to allow Sinclair to operate duopolies where Sinclair cannot legally own them.

== News operation ==
WPBN-TV presently broadcasts 37 hours, 10 minutes of locally produced newscasts each week (with 7 hours, 5 minutes each weekday, one hour on Saturdays and 1 hour, 5 minutes on Sundays).

When WTOM first began broadcasting, it had its own studio on US 23 east of Cheboygan, and broke off from WPBN's signal to air its own newscasts. However, by the early 1980s, this operation had been eliminated, and WTOM is now a full-time satellite of WPBN.

=== News department history ===
WPBN's owners have traditionally poured significant resources into its news operation, resulting in a much higher-quality product than conventional wisdom would suggest for such a small market. Currently, the station produces and airs 27 hours of news a week, a considerable amount for a station in the 120th market. In terms of viewership, WPBN has long been a distant runner-up in the news ratings behind WWTV, according to Nielsen Media Research. WPBN has traditionally had more of a Traverse City focus, while WWTV focuses on the entire Northern Michigan region.

Station alumni include Christa Quinn and the immortal "Deputy" Don Melvoin who first hosted the Deputy Don kids' show in the 1950s. After a stint in Hollywood that included roles on The Twilight Zone and a movie filmed on Mackinac Island called Somewhere in Time, Melvoin came back to WPBN to host Deputy Don Rides Again and the horror flick Count Zappula. Don Melvoin died in 2002. In addition to its main studios, WPBN operates a bureau in Gaylord on West Main Street, and in Manistee at the Vogue Theater on River Street. In the past, the station had also maintained newsrooms in Petoskey and Cadillac, as well as WTOM's former studio in Cheboygan.

On September 10, 2007, it began airing a midday broadcast weekdays at 11 a.m. after Today expanded to four hours. In January 2009, the station laid off nine employees and canceled the weekday midday show. After WGTU consolidated its operations with WPBN, it became possible full newscasts would return to WGTU for the first time since 1984. On September 13, 2010, WPBN began producing a weeknight newscast at 6:30 on WGTU, UpNorthLive Tonight. It originates from a secondary set at WPBN's studios, and features local news and weather but also goes into detail covering community events and various businesses. There is no sports report given in this broadcast. The only other newscast on the station is a pre-recorded 10-minute weeknight update at 11 p.m.

Morgan Murphy Media acquired WBKB-TV in Alpena in late 2023, a station which carries four of the five major commercial networks through subchannels to serve the market. WBKB traditionally struggled to maintain a full-time news and weather staff due to industry labor issues and Alpena's overall low market standing which left it in a state of constant turnover, with recent graduates working on-air on short 'starter' contracts. On April 4, 2024, Sinclair and MMM announced a news partnership with WPBN/WTOM, which would start by the last week of the same month. WBKB's Alpena news operation became a bureau for WPBN/WTOM and still originated news stories and some newscasts, with all WPBN/WTOM newscasts airing on WBKB-DT2 (matching the former's NBC affiliation) and other newscasts also simulcast on the station's CBS and ABC channels, and separate lower-third graphics to feature news and weather information for Alpena. WPBN/WTOM also took over weather responsibilities for WBKB-TV, which had been fulfilled by a mix of contracted meteorologists and forecasts complied by NewsNet in Cadillac over the last few years and struggled to remain staffed by the station full-time. WBKB's Fox channel continued to feature no news programming.

== Technical information ==
=== Subchannels ===
The stations' signals are multiplexed:

Subchannels of WPBN-TV and WTOM-TV
Subchannel		Res.	Short name		Programming
WPBN-TV	WTOM-TV	Res.	WPBN-TV	WTOM-TV	Programming
7.1	4.1	1080i	NBC		NBC
7.2	4.2	720p	ABC		ABC (WGTU/WGTQ)
7.3	4.3	480i	Comet		Comet
7.4	N/A	480i	TheNest		The Nest

Simulcast of subchannels of another station

=== Translators ===
- WPBN-TV (DRT) 22 Harrietta
- WPBN-TV (DRT) 18 Traverse City
