= List of programs broadcast by Pop (American TV channel) =

This is a list of programs formerly and currently broadcast by Pop, an American cable network previously known as Prevue Guide/Channel, TV Guide Channel/Network, and TVGN.

== Current programming ==
=== Acquired programs ===
Program	Year	Notes
48 Hours	(2021–present)	
Criminal Minds	(2023−present)	
FBI	(2022–present)	
Law & Order	(2023−present)	
NCIS: New Orleans	(2019–present)	
Scorpion	(2019–present)	

== Former programming ==
=== Original series ===
==== Scripted ====
- Nightcap (2016–17)
- Hollywood Darlings (2017–18)
- Return of the Mac (2017)
- Let's Get Physical (2018)
- Florida Girls (2019)
- One Day at a Time (Season 4) (2020)

==== Scripted co-productions ====
- Schitt's Creek (2015–20)
- Flack (2019)

==== Others ====
- Look-a-Like (2004–10) – Makeover program involving people wanting to look like certain celebrities.
- InFANity (2005–10) – One-hour program devoted to a detailed history and interviews with stars of one primetime series. Hosted by Lisa Joyner.
- Sushi TV (2005–07) – a comedy clip show showing obscure moments from Japanese game shows, such as bizarre eating contests, physical challenges or people's scary and interesting talents.
- Idol Chat & Idol Tonight (2006–09) – Official discussion of the week's events on American Idol. Hosted by Kimberly Caldwell and Justin Guarini (Rosanna Tavarez was a former co-host from 2006–08, and Manny Streetz was a guest correspondent in 2007)
- Reality Chat (2006–09) – Discussion show about reality television. Hosted by Rosanna Tavarez and Sadie Murray (Kimberly Caldwell was a former co-host from 2006–08)
- Square-Off (2006–07) – A weekly series presenting news and views about television. Included are panel discussions of TV issues.
- The Fashion Team (2006–11) Hosted by Lawrence Zarian, is a 30-minute weekly series that focuses on red carpet styles and beauty secrets. The show also gave fans a peek inside celebrities' closets and the hottest boutiques.
- TV Watercooler (2006–09) – A weekly recap of TV's noteworthy shows and moments. Hosted by John Fugelsang and Teresa Strasser (Debra Wilson was a former co-host in 2006)
- America's Next Producer (2007) – Competition series where the winner received a $100,000 prize and development deal with TVGC.
- Making News: Texas Style (2007–08) – Follows news anchors at TV stations in the state of Texas. During the first season, the anchors of Odessa, Texas, CBS affiliate KOSA were featured (some episodes also featured an anchor at the market's NBC affiliate, KWES). The second season followed anchors at the duopoly of WJCL and WTGS, the ABC and Fox affiliates (respectively) in Savannah, Georgia, as well as long-dominant CBS affiliate WTOC and NBC affiliate WSAV, from time to time. The second season was called Making News: Savannah Style.
- Celebrity Says! (2008) – Man on the street game show where interviewees attempted to guess what a celebrity said during a red carpet interview. Hosted by Dave Holmes.
- Hollywood 411 (2008–11) – Entertainment newsmagazine program hosted by Chris Harrison; varied over the years between a daily and weekly presentation.
- Hollywood 411 on Set (2009) – Set visits and behind-the-scenes info on the latest movies, profiling three each show.
- FashioNation (2011) – Matthew Hoffman hosts a comedic take on celebrity fashion. Segments include "Who Shot My Collie?" and a "shoe-off." Also: Paulina Porizkova gives tips on posing for the red carpet.
- Hollywood Girls Night (2011–12) – Female celebrities gather for casual dinner parties, where they gossip and share personal stories.
- Celebrity Style Story (2012) – The evolution of a celebrity's style is chronicled in this series.
- Nail Files (2011) – Original reality series about the owner of a Los Angeles nail salon.
- StandUp in Stilettos (2012) – Half-hour series which features 3 female comedians in front of a live studio audience. Hosted by Kate Flannery
- Wilson Phillips: Still Holding On (2012) – Original reality series about the personal lives of 1990s female pop trio Wilson Phillips.
- Entertainment Tonight Live at/from... (2013–15)
- Mother of All Talent (October 22, 2013)
- Big Brother: After Dark (2013–19) - Previously aired on Showtime 2 from 2007 to 2012.
- Tequila Sisters (December 10, 2013)
- The Sorrentinos (July 15, 2014) – Half hour reality series which features Michael "The Situation" Sorrentino and his family.
- PopSugar Now (2014–15) – Daily entertainment newsmagazine from the pop culture website.
- Rock This Boat: New Kids on the Block (2015) - A reality show starring members of the boy band New Kids on the Block.
- Queens of Drama (2015) – Following soap opera stars and real life drama.
- Sing It On (2015–16) – Hour-long docu-reality series about college a cappella.
- The Story Behind (2015)
- Paragon Pro TV (2015-16) – Weekly professional wrestling show produced by the Paragon Pro Wrestling promotion
- Impact! (2016–19) – Two-hour-long presentation of professional wrestling from the Impact Wrestling promotion.
- Hot Date (2017–19) - Half-hour romance-themed sketch comedy series based on the CollegeHumor web series of the same name starring Brian K. Murphy and Emily Axford.
- Celebrity Big Brother: After Dark (2018–19)

=== Acquired programs ===
- 7th Heaven (2014)
- 60 Minutes (2016)
- 90210 (2015)
- Awkwafina Is Nora from Queens (2020)
- Baywatch (2016–17)
- Beauty & the Beast (2014)
- Beverly Hills, 90210 (2014–20)
- Big Brother (2013–19)
- The Bold and the Beautiful (2013–17)
- The Brady Bunch (2016)
- Buffy the Vampire Slayer (2016–17)
- Cagney & Lacey (2001–2017)
- Caroline in the City (2012)
- CBS News Sunday Morning (2019–20) (same-day repeat of CBS broadcast)
- Celebrity Big Brother (2018–19)
- Celebrity Name Game (2017–18)
- Charlie's Angels (2012–2014)
- Charmed (2018−22)
- Cheers (2013–15)
- Chicago Hope (2010–12)
- Chico and the Man (2010–2020)
- Coach (2014)
- Columbo (2015–2017)
- Combat! (2021–2022)
- The Cosby Show (2012–2014)
- Curb Your Enthusiasm (2010–11)
- Cybill (2011–13)
- The Daily Buzz (2017–19)
- Dawson's Creek (2012–18)
- Days of Our Lives (2015–16) (same-day repeat of NBC broadcast)
- Designing Women (2011–14)
- Dharma & Greg (2011–13)
- Dynasty (2014–15)
- Early Edition (2012–13)
- Eastwick (2010–12)
- ER (2017–25)
- Family Ties (2019)
- Ghost Whisperer (2016−22)
- Gilmore Girls (2019–20)
- Grace Under Fire (2011–12)
- The Goldbergs (2017–23)
- The Guardian (2012–13)
- Hollywood Showdown (2006–08; acquired repeats from Pax TV/Game Show Network run)
- House (2018−22)
- I Love Lucy (2016)
- JAG (2014–15)
- Jericho (2015)
- Joan of Arcadia (2014)
- Just Shoot Me! (2010–12)
- The Late Show with Stephen Colbert (2020) (Next-day repeat of CBS broadcast)
- The Love Boat (2014–19)
- Love Island (2019)
- The McCarthys (2015)
- Melrose Place (2014–15)
- The Naked Truth (2013)
- Ned and Stacey (2011–12)
- The O.C. (2016–17)
- The Parkers (2015)
- Punk'd (2009–11)
- Rove LA (2012) – Imported series from Australia's Fox8 network featuring talk show host Rove McManus's Los Angeles-set celebrity talk show
- Sabrina, the Teenage Witch (2016–17)
- Samantha Who? (2011–12)
- South Park (2022)
- Star Trek (2017)
- Star Trek: The Next Generation (2020)
- That '70s Show (2015–16)
- Ugly Betty (2009–12)
- Undercover Boss (2019)
- Unusually Thicke (2014–15)
- Veronica's Closet (2011–12)
- Weeds (2010–12)
- The Wendy Williams Show (2018–19) (Next-day repeat of syndicated-broadcast)
- Who's the Boss? (2012–15)
- Wings (2014–15)
- Yellowstone (2022)
- The Young and the Restless (2013–19)

=== Interstitial programs during scrolling listings ===
- Movievue (1988–98)
- Musicvue (1988–98)
- Network Spotlight (1988–98)
- Prevue Tonight (1988–98)
- Prevue Weekend (1988–99)
- ReelTalk (1988–98)
- Sportscope (1988–98)
- Earthvue (1991–98)
- Holiday Spotlight (1994)
- FamilyVue (1995–98)
- Intervue (1995–98)
- The Big Picture (1996–98)
- WWF Free for All (1996–98)
- Prevue Family (1998–99)
- Prevue Music (1998–99)
- Prevue News and Weather (1998–99)
- Prevue Revue (1998–99)
- Prevue Sports (1998–99)
- Prevue This (1998–99)
- Prevue TV (1998–99)
- TV Guide Celebrity Chat (1999-2002)
- TV Guide 4-Star Movies (1999–2000)
- TV Guide Family Finds (1999–2002)
- TV Guide Insider (1999–2002)
- TV Guide Movie Close-Up (1999–2001)
- TV Guide Movie Profile (1999–2000)
- TV Guide Newsbrief (1999–2000)
- TV Guide Pay-Per-View Close-Up (1999–2000)
- TV Guide Sportsview (1999–2002)
- TV Guide Sports Insider (1999-2002)
- TV Guide TV Close-Up (1999–2001)
- TV Guide Weather (segment version, 1999–2000; ticker version, 1999–2015)
- TV Guide Weekend TV Close-Up (1999-2001)
- TV Guide Music News (2000–03)
- TV Guide Quick Flicks (2000–02)
- TV Guide – The Screening Room (2001–04)
- TV Guide – 90 Second Life Story (2001–04)
