= 2019 in American television network changes =

The following are lists of changes to American television networks, including changes of station affiliations, that occurred in 2019.

== Launches ==
Network	Type	Launch date	Notes	Source
NewsNet	Over-the-air multicast/ OTT streaming	January 1	Owned by NewsNet LLC and based on the all-news formats of Cadillac, Michigan low-power station WMNN-LD and Norfolk, Nebraska-based News Channel Nebraska, of which the network's founders were involved in their development, NewsNet will maintain a traditional news wheel format (similar in structure to the 1982–2005 format of HLN, and the formats of defunct all-news networks such as All News Channel and Satellite News Channel), with updates throughout the broadcast day during breaking news events, while excluding political- and panel-based shows that fill the afternoon and nighttime lineups of most cable news channels. In addition to offering local advertising slots, NewsNet – which originated through an unsuccessful 2017 Kickstarter campaign under the working title, the Local News Network (LNN), before its founders opted to obtain investor backing to fund the venture – will offer prospective affiliates airtime for local news inserts, with a turnkey local news production service option available to stations without their own local news departments.	
Cleo TV	Cable/satellite	January 19	Owned by Urban One and launching initially on Spectrum and Xfinity systems (for the latter, it is part of meeting the commitments made by Comcast to obtain approval of its 2011 merger with NBCUniversal to begin carrying ten independently owned and operated networks, including eight owned and/or operated by minorities, by 2019), Cleo TV – derived from Egyptian ruler Cleopatra – focuses on lifestyle and entertainment programming aimed at women of color in the millennial and Gen X demographic. The network's content will focus on programming that "defies negative and cultural stereotypes of today's modern women," with a broad mix of short- and long-form programming (including travel, home design, relationship and financial advice and cooking programs, as well as talk shows, docu-series, sitcoms and movies). It will also serve as a de facto replacement for Fuse, which was removed on Xfinity systems at the start of the year due to channel drift concerns involving its schedule of low-interest sitcoms and films.	
PBS Living	OTT streaming	March 14	Overseen by PBS Distribution and launching on Amazon's Prime Video Channels subscription service (which already carries two PBS-branded streaming channels, PBS Kids and PBS Masterpiece), PBS Living features a mix of lifestyle and how-to content distributed for public television by American Public Television and individual PBS member stations. The $2.99-per-month service, which will also offer an introductory seven-day free trial, will feature a mix of classic and recent programs from the cooking, home, culture and travel genres seen on PBS and the similarly formatted OTA multicast network Create (such as The French Chef, This Old House, Antiques Roadshow, No Passport Required and Christopher Kimball's Milk Street Television), with new content being added each month.	
Court TV	Over-the-air multicast/ OTT streaming	May 8	Announced on December 10, 2018, the E. W. Scripps Company's Katz Networks unit "reboot[ed]" Court TV – utilizing, through Katz/Scripps' acquisition of intellectual property rights to the name, format and other assets from the Turner Broadcasting System, the format originally used by cable network TruTV from its July 1991 launch until December 2007 – as a digital multicast network focusing on live coverage and in-depth analysis of high-profile courtroom proceedings as well as true crime-focused shows from (the cable) Court TV's program library (including some to which soon-to-be sister network Escape has held syndication rights). The network will initially be available on stations owned by Scripps, Tribune Broadcasting (which will likely have its Court TV affiliation agreements inherited by Nexstar Media Group upon closure of its acquisition of Tribune, plus at least one other Nexstar station where Scripps already has a station), Entravision Communications, Citadel Communications and Univision Communications, with an initial reach of more than 50% of U.S. television households and concurrent cable carriage of 25% of U.S. cable homes.	
NBC News Now	OTT streaming	May 29	Launched on May 29, NBC News Now is an advertiser-supported digital news channel available as a stream on the NBC News website and mobile app and on Apple TV, Roku, Amazon Fire TV device, which will provide eight hours of rolling news programming each weekday from 3:00 to 11:00 p.m. ET as well as hourly updates on top news headlines and breaking news (referred to as "Briefly's").	
ACC Network	Cable/satellite	August 22	The linear ACC Network was initially announced in 2016 by ESPN and the NCAA Division I's Atlantic Coast Conference. ESPN has purchased the rights to ACC football and basketball from the conference's long-time syndication partner Raycom Sports, which has broadcast ACC sporting events from December 1982 until after the 2019 ACC men's basketball tournament. The network will feature live game broadcasts and related coverage of the ACC and its member schools. This also makes the ACC the fifth Division I conference to have a dedicated television network after the Big Ten, Pac-12, and Southeastern Conference, along with the defunct Mountain West Conference network.	
Dabl	Over-the-air multicast	September 9	Founded by CBS Television Stations, which carries the network on some of its CBS, CW, MyNetworkTV and independent station properties, Dabl (pronounced "dabble") offers lifestyle programming centering around cooking, home renovation and design, do-it-yourself projects, pet care and travel (including select library programs featuring lifestyle experts such as Martha Stewart and Emeril Lagasse). In addition to the CBS-owned charter stations, the network will initially launch primarily on subchannels of television stations owned by other groups (including Tribune Broadcasting, Meredith Corporation, Sinclair Broadcast Group and Univision Communications) encompassing around 70% of the country (including all of the top 10 markets and 23 of the top 25 markets).	
BET+	Over-the-top streaming	September 19	The Viacom-owned network joint ventured with Tyler Perry to launch a subscription streaming service that combines the prolific auteur's library of movies and TV shows with BET's programming vault, featuring a handful of original series and productions and a deep library offering that will be enhanced by other properties in Viacom's portfolio, totaling more than 1,000 hours of content, targeted toward an African American audience. The new service will carry all episodes of First Wives Club, a series originally intended for Paramount Network, at launch (it will have a traditional week-to-week rollout on the regular BET network).	
Apple TV+	Over-the-top streaming	November 1	Apple Inc. launched a streaming subscription service with original content available via its Apple TV digital media players. The service is alternately available through the "Apple TV App" on the Roku, My Specialist, and Amazon Fire TV platforms, along with apps allowing the use of Apple's AirPlay technology through several smart TV's.	
Disney+	Over-the-top streaming	November 12	Disney+ is a streaming paid subscription service featuring original films and series based on new and existing properties, including Marvel, Star Wars, 20th Century Fox, National Geographic, and Pixar content, with Disney CEO Bob Iger also making claims the vast majority of Disney's film library will be available through the service, including previously discontinued titles that were placed into the Disney Vault. The service reached 10 million subscribers on its first day, exceeding expectations, which caused technical difficulties. ZDNet later discovered users' accounts were being hacked and put up for sale on the Dark web. Classic films such as Dumbo, The Jungle Book, Mary Poppins, and Peter Pan included a warning about scenes containing outdated cultural stereotypes which Disney says some viewers may now find offensive or insensitive.	
beIN Sports Xtra	Over-the-air multicast/ OTT streaming	November 18 (streaming); December 16 (OTA multicast)	BeIN Media Group launched BeIN Sports Xtra on November 18, 2019, as an ad-supported streaming service on Roku and Pluto TV; the service offers soccer, combat and adventure sports content (prefaced by coverage of major international soccer leagues and tournaments such as Ligue 1, La Liga and Süper Lig, as well as team offerings from Paris Saint-Germain F.C. and the France women's national football team), and news/analysis/highlight programs. BeIN Sports Xtra expanded to conventional television on December 16 via an affiliation agreement with HC2 Broadcasting that provided the service subchannel carriage on HC2-owned stations in 15 major and mid-sized markets (including Los Angeles, Chicago, Philadelphia and Dallas–Fort Worth).	
ScreenPix	Premium cable	December 12	Owned by Metro-Goldwyn-Mayer and launching initially on Xfinity systems, ScreenPix – a movie-centered companion service to general-entertainment premium channel Epix – focuses on theatrical feature films from the libraries of MGM, Paramount Pictures, Sony Pictures Entertainment and The Samuel Goldwyn Company/Samuel Goldwyn Films released between the 1960s and the 1990s. The four-channel service – which includes multiplex services ScreenPix Action (action and adventure films), ScreenPix Westerns (Western films and series), and ScreenPix Voices (films from actors and filmmakers of color) – was created through an expansion to Epix's 2018 carriage agreement with Comcast that resulted in Epix replacing rival pay service Starz as a pre-packaged premium service on Xfinity's digital tiers on December 4. (ScreenPix's launch coincided with its parent network's multiplex services, Epix 2, Epix Hits and Epix Drive-In, being added to Xfinity systems; a reduced tier of Starz and Starz Encore channels remain available to Xfinity subscribers as a premium add-on to all channel packages.)	

== Conversions and rebrandings ==
Old network name	New network name	Type	Conversion date	Notes	Source
Ion Life	Ion Plus	Over-the-air multicast/ cable–satellite	July 1	The rebranding from Ion Life complements the Ion Media network's programming refocus from lifestyle programming to archived original and acquired drama series from the Ion Television library, a refocus that took place on January 1 amid its transition to a must-carry primary channel slot in several Ion O&O markets. The "Ion Plus" name was previously used by the company from 2008 to 2013 for a direct-to-cable secondary national feed of Ion Television that incorporated the former Ion Life's lifestyle programming during timeslots in which its parent network aired paid and religious programming.	
Univision Deportes Network	TUDN	Cable/satellite	July 20	Announced on May 8, 2019 and coinciding with the start of the start of the 2019–20 Liga MX season, the simplification in the Spanish language sports network's name is part of a coordinated rebranding with Televisa Deportes Network in Mexico (in the United States, the network was previously officially known as "Univision Deportes Network-Televisa Deportes Network", with the TDN logo appended into Univision Deportes' logo). TUDN, an abbreviation for "Televisa Univision Deportes Network" (and pronounced "tu-d-n," or "your sports network"), extends its branding to encompass sports telecasts on sister networks Univision, UniMás and Galavisión, and utilizes sharing of sports programming, talent, and production capabilities from the U.S. and Mexico through a collaboration with Univision programming partner Grupo Televisa.	
evine	ShopHQ	Over-the-air and cable/satellite	August 21	evine, which has struggled as the nation's third largest shopping network due to Internet competition and pressure from Qurate Retail Group's newly merged brands of QVC and HSN, announces a return to the ShopHQ brand it held from 2013 to 2015, after several changes to management, employee cuts, and a deep investment from the network's most prime vendor, Invicta Watch Group, mainly due to market research confusing the network with "E"-branded entertainment news providers such as E! and Entertainment Tonight. The rebranding comes as the company copes with a threat of a NASDAQ delisting due to continued struggles with its stock price. The company plans to launch two new networks (with their distribution channels and launch dates not announced); the Spanish-language LaVenta, and male-focused Bulldog, a rebranding itself of the little-carried subnetwork, "evine TOO". Officially, it is the oft-rebranded network's fifth rebranding, after launching as ValueVision in 1991, and rebranding as ShopNBC from 2000 until 2013, when NBCUniversal sold off their stake in the network.	
Escape	Court TV Mystery	Over-the-air multicast	September 30	Fresh off its relaunch of Court TV as an over-the-air multicast channel in May, owner Katz Broadcasting extends the recognizable brand to its five-year-old Escape, which has long focused on true-life and dramatic crime and mystery programming.	
Viceland	Vice on TV	Cable/satellite	December 2	The Vice Media/A&E Networks joint venture network has a minor rebrand after three years without any advance notice or publicity regarding the change.	

== Closures ==
Network	Type	End date	Notes	Source
StarPlus networks	Cable/satellite	January 4	Indian media giant Star India, controlled at the time by 21st Century Fox, makes the decision to withdraw their six linear networks (Star India Plus, Star India Gold, Star Vijay, Maa, Asianet and Movies OK) from American distribution to focus completely on the distribution of their streaming service Hotstar in North America (it had already withdrawn its programming from ATN in Canada in the fall of 2017 to focus on Hotstar), which overall offers more consumer value with more programming from the Subcontinent, than the limited amount of timeslots on those six networks, along with the markup of those networks by pay television providers to justify their carriage costs due to fewer subscribers to southeast Asian programming packages. As a part of the Fox/Disney merger, Hotstar and its programming has since been marketed by The Walt Disney Company as one of the deal's prime assets.	
Vibrant TV Network	OTT streaming service/digital multicast network	January 31	Vibrant TV Network, a service that primarily distributed international programs to American audiences, ceased operations January 31 after slightly over four years of operation without notice.	
KidsClick	OTT streaming service/broadcast programming block	March 31	KidsClick, a multi-platform children's programming effort developed by Sinclair Broadcast Group, was abruptly discontinued as a syndicated programming block on March 31, less than two years after its July 2017 launch; its companion over-the-top streaming service subsequently wound down operations over the following week. The hybrid service was the first major effort since Vortexx ended in 2014 to provide a children's television lineup on American broadcast television that was not bound to FCC educational programming requirements, providing a daily three-hour block of mostly imported and off-network animated series from the past ten years to its affiliates (largely, those owned and/or operated by Sinclair) and a digital multicast network for national availability (This TV from the block's launch until July 2018, and Sinclair-owned TBD from May 2018 onward). Because of the abrupt closure, stations that carried the daily KidsClick program block began substituting it with paid programming and other syndicated programming, while TBD replaced it with paid programming and an expanded one-hour Wednesday-Friday block of E/I-compliant programs in its former timeslot.	
NRATV	Over-the-top streaming	June 26	The streaming service operated by advertising agency Ackerman McQueen shut down after its largest client, the National Rifle Association of America, severed its ties with the agency as part of a long-running billing dispute and power struggle in the NRA organization. The channel was pulled in part because the NRA disapproved of Ackerman McQueen broadening the service's content beyond the NRA's singular political interest of firearms rights.	
FX+	Over-the-top streaming	August 21	Originally launched in 2017 as a streaming add-on for Comcast pay-TV subscribers, and was eventually made available to pay-TV subscribers who had access to FX, FX+ is discontinued with the oncoming launch of Disney+, and FX's new Disney ownership deciding to delineate Hulu as a destination for content for a general adult audience, making FX+ effectively duplicative. Viewers were directed to FX's other viewing platforms and Hulu. It was later confirmed in early November that Hulu would become the home of most of FX's series without existing streaming deals with other platforms, with FX Productions also beginning to produce original series for the service under a new "FX on Hulu" sub-brand.	
The California Channel	Regional cable (California)	October 15	In mid-August 2019, the California Cable Television Association announced the closure of The California Channel, a legislative and public affairs channel carrying non-partisan coverage of the proceedings of the California Senate, Assembly and their various committees, along with other political coverage, which has near universal coverage on the state's cable systems. The organization and network cited the November 2016 passage of Proposition 54, a ballot initiative which required all legislative proceedings to be recorded and made public with posting them on the Internet 72 hours before a vote was tallied, and be accessible for twenty years after a proceeding. As the Senate and Assembly have internal video and radio news services, the CCTA considered The California Channel effectively a duplicative service to those efforts. The legislature has since made efforts to retain the network and its coverage before the network's closure, to keep proceedings public on a televised venue in some form.	
Disney Family Movies	Cable on-demand	October 31	A video on demand service for cable television providers which launched in 2008 and featured a consistent monthly rotation of around 10–20 live-action and animated films from the Walt Disney Pictures library (though usually not the library's most prime content), Disney Family Movies will shut down on this date, as the November 12 launch of Disney+ with a much larger library at near the same cost as Disney Family Movies made the latter completely superfluous and duplicative, along with Disney+'s wider accessibility overall.	
FiOS1	Regional cable (Greater New York)	November 13	Originally launched in June 2009 as a network exclusive to Verizon FiOS subscribers in the New York metropolitan area, the network was expected to be discontinued on November 15 after Verizon announced that it would not renew its contract with WRNN-TV, which produces the network's news content. The closure of the network left NY1 and News 12 Networks as the only two surviving cable-exclusive local news channels in the region. In September 2019, Verizon signed a deal with Altice USA to carry News 12 Networks and its sister channels Cheddar and i24 News in order to compensate for the network's loss. The channel shut down two days earlier than what was previously announced.	
CLTV	Regional cable (Greater Chicago)	December 31	A 27-year-old network launched in 1993 by the Tribune Company as a 24-hour local news channel drawing upon the resources of its then-sister operations, the Chicago Tribune and its suburban papers, WGN-TV and WGN Radio, and occasionally featuring coverage of the company's Chicago Cubs baseball team, CLTV will shut down on this date after a number of upheavals throughout the last decade. This included Tribune's publishing and broadcasting assets spun off into separate companies after Sam Zell's unsuccessful attempt to take the company private, Tribune Media being part of a failed merger attempt with Sinclair Broadcast Group in 2018, then a successful merger with Nexstar Media Group in 2019, and most of all, WGN-TV's news operation moving from only two hour-long noon and 9 p.m. newscasts in 1993 and a total of 16 hour of news a week, to a market-leading operation with 70 1/2 hours of news coverage per week at nearly all hours of the day. WGN's newscasts being available through streaming venues, and CLTV's news output declining to a number of hours after its operations were merged into WGN-TV in 2014, along with the removal of its original programming from the Tribune, and with a complete dependence on cable-only coverage, left CLTV all but superfluous after the broadcast-focused Nexstar's acquisition of the WGN stations and CLTV.	

== Station launches ==
Date	Market	Station	Channel	Affiliation	Source
January 1	Vero Beach, Florida (West Palm Beach/Boca Raton/Fort Piece)	WWCI-CD	10.1	NewsNet	
January 1	Santa Cruz, California (San Francisco-Oakland-San Jose)	KAAP-LD	24.7	NewsNet	
January 1	Louisville, Kentucky	W50CI-D	8.6	NewsNet	
January 1	Detroit, Michigan	WHNE-LD	14.9	NewsNet	
January 1	Manteo, North Carolina (Norfolk/Portsmouth/Newport News/Virginia Beach)	W17CT-D	17.4	NewsNet	
January 1	Houston, Texas	KBPX-LD	46.12	NewsNet	
January 1	State College, Pennsylvania (Johnstown-Altoona)	WHVL-LD	29.3	NewsNet	
January 1	Buffalo, New York	WBXZ-LP	56.11	NewsNet	
January 2	Odessa/Midland, Texas	KOSA-TV	7.4	Ion Television	
January 2	Odessa/Midland, Texas	KTLE-LD	7.5	Telemundo	
January 2	Odessa/Midland, Texas	KTLE-LD	7.6	MyNetworkTV	
January 2	Odessa/Midland, Texas	KTLE-LD	7.7	Heroes & Icons	
February 1	Green Bay, Wisconsin	WBAY-TV	2.4	Heroes & Icons	
February 1	Green Bay, Wisconsin	WBAY-TV	2.5	Start TV	
May 1	Fort Wayne, Indiana	WISE-TV	33.3	Grit	
May 1	Fort Wayne, Indiana	WISE-TV	33.5	Start TV	
May 1	Fort Wayne, Indiana	WISE-TV	33.6	MeTV	
May 8	Fort Wayne, Indiana	WISE-TV	33.4	Court TV	
May 8	Panama City, Florida	WPGX	28.4	Court TV	
July 1	Fort Wayne, Indiana	WFWA	39.5	Local Weather	
September 9	Fort Wayne, Indiana	WISE-TV	33.7	Dabl	
December 1	St. James, Minnesota (Mankato)	KMNF-LD	7.1	NBC	
December 1	St. James, Minnesota (Mankato)	KMNF-LD	7.2	CW+	
December 1	Harrisonburg, Virginia	WSVW-LD	30.1	NBC	
December 1	Harrisonburg, Virginia	WSVW-LD	30.2	CW+	

== Stations changing network affiliation ==
=== Major affiliation changes ===
This section outlines affiliation changes involving English and Spanish language networks (ABC, NBC, CBS, Fox, PBS, The CW, Univision, etc.), and format conversions involving independent stations. Digital subchannels will only be mentioned if the prior or new affiliation involves a major English and Spanish broadcast network or a locally programmed independent entertainment format.

Date	Market	Station	Channel	Prior affiliation	New affiliation	Notes	Source
January 2	Waco/Temple/ Killeen, Texas	KWTX-DT2	10.2	The CW (via The CW Plus)	Telemundo	As a byproduct of its August 28, 2018, purchase of the license from the Central Texas College Board of Trustees (which was possible as KNCT broadcasts on a channel originally reserved for commercial broadcasting prior to channel 46's establishment as a PBS member station in November 1970), Gray Television – which has held the local affiliation rights for The CW Plus since September 2006 – relocates KWTX-DT2's CW programming to the main channel of the KNCT spectrum. KNCT, which will become part of a duopoly with CBS affiliate KWTX-TV, will also carry programming from MeTV on its DT2 subchannel (with a simulcast on newly established KWTX-DT3) and Start TV on its DT3 subchannel.	
January 2	Belton/Killeen/ Temple/Waco, Texas	KNCT	46.1	Silent transition from PBS	The CW (via The CW Plus; relocated from KWTX-DT2)		
January 2	Belton/Killeen/ Temple/Waco, Texas	KNCT	46.2	Silent transition from PBS	MeTV		
January 2	Belton/Killeen/ Temple/Waco, Texas	KNCT	46.3	Silent transition from PBS	Start TV		
January 2	Odessa/Midland, Texas	KOSA-TV	7.2	MyNetworkTV	The CW	As a result of Gray Television acquiring the Midland/Odessa-area affiliation rights for the two networks from NBC affiliate KWES-TV through the company's acquisition of Raycom Media, Gray relocates CW Plus and Telemundo programming to KCWO-TV (which had been serving as a KWES satellite, as KWAB-TV, since 1962) and simulcast feeds on the DT2 and DT3 subchannels of KOSA-TV. KOSA-DT2's former main schedule (including content from the MyNetworkTV programming service) moves to KTLE-LD6 (whose parent station's Telemundo affiliation will also be added as a simulcast on KOSA-DT3), with KOSA-DT3's former Heroes & Icons affiliation concurrently moving to KCWO-DT3 and KTLE-DT7 and Ion Television programming being added to KOSA-DT4.	
January 2	Odessa/Midland, Texas	KOSA-TV	7.3	Heroes & Icons	Telemundo		
January 2	Big Spring, Texas (Odessa/Midland)	KCWO-TV	4.1	NBC (as satellite of KWES-TV)	The CW (via The CW Plus; relocated from the former KWAB-DT2)		
January 2	Big Spring, Texas (Odessa/Midland)	KCWO-TV	4.2	The CW (via The CW Plus)	Telemundo		
January 2	Big Spring, Texas (Odessa/Midland)	KCWO-TV	4.3	Telemundo	Heroes & Icons		
January 28	Honolulu, Hawaii	KHII-TV	9.1 (ID as channel 5 on-air)	MyNetworkTV (as KFVE)	MyNetworkTV (as KHII)	With Nexstar taking ownership of KFVE from Gray Television in order for the latter to comply with FCC rules pertaining to its acquisition of CBS affiliate KGMB and NBC affiliate KHNL from Raycom Media, Nexstar changed the station's call letters to KHII (which retains its MyNetworkTV affiliation) and adopted a separate programming inventory featuring additional newscasts produced by Fox-affiliated sister KHON-TV (bringing that station's news output to 43 hours across both stations, the most among Hawaii's television stations) and syndicated shows moved over to the station from KHON and its CW-affiliated DT2 subchannel. Concurrently, KFVE's intellectual unit (including Hawaii News Now newscasts and Hawaii-centric specials as well as syndicated programs) moved to the second digital subchannel of KHNL (downgraded to 4:3 SD due to bandwidth limitations, relegating the HD feed of the former KFVE [which retains its existing "K5" brand as a subchannel-only service] exclusively to statewide pay television providers). Charter Spectrum also moved "K5"'s cable channel position from 5 (SD)/1005 (HD) to 22 (SD)/1022 (HD). Antenna TV was also relocated to KHNL-DT3, while Grit moved to KHNL-DT4.	
January 28	Honolulu, Hawaii	KHNL	13.2	Antenna TV	"K5" (independent)/Hawaii News Now		
January 28	Honolulu, Hawaii	KHNL	13.3	Grit	Antenna TV		
January 28	Honolulu, Hawaii	KHNL	13.4	New subchannel	Grit		
February 1	Janesville, Wisconsin (Madison)	WIFS	57.1	Independent	Ion Plus	Since losing The CW affiliation to WMTV-DT2 in September 2016, the Byrne Acquisition Group-owned WIFS had been a locally focused independent station. The abrupt move to Ion Life (later renamed to Ion Plus July 1) and the addition of Ion Television to a new 9th subchannel is part of Ion Media's new strategy to acquire cable/satellite carriage for Ion Life via primary channel must-carry rules (Ion Television's main channel utilizes the national cable feed for Madison area cable carriage). With the move, some of WIFS' local and syndicated content moves to TVW, the MyNetworkTV-affiliated second subchannel of WISC-TV (which had carried Ion Television on its third subchannel).	
February 1	Janesville, Wisconsin (Madison)	WIFS	57.9	New subchannel	Ion Television		
September 1	Chicago, Illinois	WCIU-TV	26.1	Independent	The CW	On April 18, 2019, Weigel Broadcasting signed an agreement with CBS Corporation through which WCIU-TV would take over as The CW's Chicago-area affiliate; WPWR-TV – which had been carrying the network's programming since September 1, 2016, when WGN-TV disaffiliated from The CW to allow additional prime time telecasts of Chicago Cubs, White Sox, Bulls and Blackhawks games rather than diverting select games during that daypart to other local stations (among them, WPWR) as it had been doing since 1999 to adhere with preemption restrictions imposed by The CW and predecessor The WB – will continue to serve as an owned-and-operated station of Fox-run MyNetworkTV (although the station's schedule post-CW disaffiliation may be formatted similar to Fox's other non-Fox-O&O stations, prioritizing syndicated programming during the programming service's designated 7:00–9:00 p.m. time slot, while airing the MyNetworkTV schedule in late prime time or late access). WCIU will move its prime time lineup of syndicated programs (including the freshman Tamron Hall Show) to low-power sister station WMEU-CD (channel 48, which is simulcast on WCIU-DT2).	
September 1	Gary, Indiana; Chicago, Illinois	WPWR-TV	50.1	The CW (primary); MyNetworkTV (secondary)	MyNetworkTV (exclusive)		
September 30	Columbia, South Carolina	WIS	10.2	Bounce TV (to 10.3)	The CW	On May 29, 2019, Gray Television signed an agreement with CBS Corporation through which WIS would take over as The CW's Columbia affiliate (through its DT2 subchannel) effective September 30; WKTC – which had been carrying the network's programming since March 17, 2014, when WZRB disaffiliated from The CW to become an Ion Television owned-and-operated station – will continue to affiliate of MyNetworkTV (with which it had been affiliated prior to the move of the CW affiliation) in its existing timeslot, with syndicated programming filling primetime. Bounce TV thus bumps down one subchannel to WIS-DT3, displacing the Grit diginet, which was moved to WKTC-DT7.	
September 30	Sumter/Columbia, South Carolina	WKTC	63.1	The CW (primary); MyNetworkTV (secondary)	MyNetworkTV (exclusive)		

=== Subchannel affiliation ===
Date	Market	Station	Channel	Prior affiliation	New affiliation	Source
January 1	Florence, Alabama (Huntsville-Decatur)	WXFL-LD	10.1	Youtoo America	NewsNet	
January 1	Cathedral City, California (Palm Springs)	KAKZ-LD	4.4	QVC	NewsNet	
January 1	Kansas City, Kansas	KCKS-LD	25.2	Justice Network	NewsNet	
January 1	Sublette, Kansas	KDGL-LD	23.5	Retro Television Network	NewsNet	
January 1	Topeka, Kansas	WROB-LD	25.2	Justice Network	NewsNet	
January 1	Wichita, Kansas	KCTU-LD	5.4	Opportunity Knocks TV	NewsNet	
January 1	Baton Rouge, Louisiana	WLFT-CD	30.3	HSN	NewsNet	
January 1	Nashville, Tennessee	WJDE-LD	31.4	HSN	NewsNet	
January 1	Dalton, Georgia (Chattanooga, Tennessee)	WDNN-CD	49.3	Retro Television Network	NewsNet	
January 1	Arlington Heights, Illinois (Chicago)	WRJK-LP	22.6	Charge!	NewsNet	
January 7	Fresno/Visalia, California	KVBC-LP	13.9	My Life TV	NewsNet	
January 28	Shaker Heights, Ohio (Cleveland)	WOIO	19.2	MeTV	MyNetworkTV (additional secondary affiliation in overnight hours with MeTV remaining primary; shifted from secondary overnight affiliation on WUAB)	
May 1	Fort Wayne, Indiana	WISE-TV	33.2	Local Weather	Justice Network	
May 8	Buffalo, New York	WIVB-TV	4.2	Laff	Court TV	
September 16	Johnstown, Pennsylvania	WJAC-TV	6.4	TBD	The CW	
September 23	Nashville, Tennessee	WKRN-DT2	2.2	MeTV	Bounce TV	
September 23	Lebanon/Nashville, Tennessee	WJFB	44.1	TCT	MeTV	
