= KWWT =

Television station in Odessa, Texas

- Odessa–Midland, Texas; United States
- City: Odessa, Texas
- Channels: Digital: 30 (UHF); Virtual: 30
- Branding: My30

Programming
- Affiliations: 30.1: Independent with MyNetworkTV; for others, see § Subchannels

Ownership
- Owner: Gray Media; (Gray Television Licensee, LLC)
- Sister stations: KOSA-TV, KCWO-TV, KTLE-LD, KMDF-LD

History
- Founded: April 9, 1998
- First air date: December 5, 2001
- Former call signs: KPXK (2001–2006)
- Former channel numbers: Analog: 30 (UHF, 2001–2009); Digital: 22 (UHF, 2009–2020)
- Former affiliations: Pax TV (2001–2005); The WB (2005–2006); The CW (via The CW Plus, 2006–2013); MeTV (2013–2020, now on DT2)
- Call sign meaning: The WB West Texas (former affiliation)

Technical information
- Licensing authority: FCC
- Facility ID: 84410
- ERP: 50 kW
- HAAT: 147 m (482 ft)
- Transmitter coordinates: 32°2′52.9″N 102°17′45.5″W

Links
- Public license information: Public file; LMS

KWWT (channel 30) is a television station licensed to Odessa, Texas, United States, serving the Permian Basin area. It is programmed primarily as an independent station, but maintains a secondary affiliation with MyNetworkTV. KWWT is owned by Gray Media alongside KOSA-TV (channel 7), KCWO-TV (channel 4), KTLE-LD (channel 20), and KMDF-LD (channel 22). The five stations share studios inside the Music City Mall on East 42nd Street in Odessa, with a secondary studio and news bureau in downtown Midland; KWWT's transmitter is located on SH 158 near Gardendale, Texas.

== History ==
The station's former logo as a WB affiliate.

KWWT signed on the air on December 5, 2001, as KPXK. It was a Pax TV affiliate until late 2005, when KWWT moved its cable-only The WB 100+ feed (which was established on September 21, 1998) to UHF channel 30.

On January 24, 2006, CBS Corporation and the Warner Bros. unit of Time Warner announced the shutdown of both UPN and The WB effective that fall. In place of these two networks, a new "fifth" network—"The CW Television Network" (its name representing the first initials of parent companies CBS and Warner Bros.), jointly owned by both companies, would launch, with a lineup primarily featuring the most popular programs from both networks. In March 2006 it was announced that KWWT would be a CW affiliate through The CW Plus.

In 2011, KWWT signed on to carry college football and basketball games from the Southland Conference Television Network. The contract lasted 4 seasons. For the first 3 seasons the games usually aired on 30.2 because CW Plus wouldn't let their programs be preempted. In 2014, the final season of the network, they aired on 30.1. Additionally KWWT aired ACC Network basketball games during the 2011–12 basketball season.

KWWT remained a CW affiliate until December 29, 2013. On that date, KWES-TV (channel 9) took over CW rights and KWWT moved MeTV to 30.1 while adding Movies! on 30.2.

On July 24, 2020, it was announced that Gray Television (owner of CBS affiliate KOSA-TV and CW affiliate KCWO-TV) would purchase KWWT and sister low-power station KMDF-LD for $1.84 million, pending approval of the Federal Communications Commission (FCC). Gray sought a failing station waiver as the Odessa–Midland market would not have at least eight independent voices after the transaction (KCWO-TV is licensed as a satellite of KOSA-TV despite airing different programming). In addition, Gray also announced that after the sale, KWWT would move its operations to the shared KOSA/KCWO facility in Odessa. The FCC granted the waiver on September 14. The sale was completed on September 30.

== Technical information ==
=== Subchannels ===
The station's signal is multiplexed:

Subchannels of KWWT
Channel	Res.	Short name	Programming
30.1	1080i	My30	MyNetworkTV
30.2	720p	MeTV	MeTV
30.3	480i	Catchy	Catchy Comedy
30.4	480i	Movies!	Movies!
30.5	480i	Cozi	Cozi TV
30.6	480i	Ion Plu	Ion Plus

=== Analog-to-digital conversion ===
KWWT shut down its analog signal, over UHF channel 30, on June 12, 2009, and "flash-cut" its digital signal into operation on its analog-era UHF channel 30. Because it was granted an original construction permit after the FCC finalized the digital television transition in the United States (DTV) allotment plan on April 21, 1997, the station did not receive a companion channel for a digital television station.

== See also ==
- Channel 5 branded TV stations in the United States
- Channel 14 branded TV stations in the United States
- Channel 16 branded TV stations in the United States
- Channel 30 digital TV stations in the United States
- Channel 30 virtual TV stations in the United States
