= KTTZ =

KTTZ may refer to:

- KTTZ-FM, a radio station (89.1 FM) licensed to Lubbock, Texas, United States
- KTTZ-TV, a television station (channel 25 digital/PSIP 5) licensed to Lubbock, Texas, United States
