= CBS 4 =

CBS 4 or CBS4 may refer to:

== Airports ==
- CBS4, the airport identifier code for Mule Creek Airport in British Columbia, Canada

== Television stations in the United States ==
=== Owned-and-operated stations ===
- KCNC-TV in Denver, Colorado
- WBZ-TV in Boston, Massachusetts
- WCCO-TV in Minneapolis–Saint Paul, Minnesota
- WFOR-TV in Miami–Fort Lauderdale, Florida

=== Affiliate stations ===
- KDBC-TV in El Paso, Texas
- KMOV in St. Louis, Missouri
- KPIC in Roseburg, Oregon
  - Re-broadcast of KVAL-TV in Eugene, Oregon
- KXLF-TV in Butte, Montana
- KXJB-LD in Fargo, North Dakota (cable channel; broadcasts on channel 30)
- WCBI-TV in Columbus, Mississippi
- WGFL in Gainesville, Florida (cable channel; broadcasts on channel 28)
- WHBF-TV in Rock Island, Illinois
- WIVB-TV in Buffalo, New York
- WTTV in Bloomington–Indianapolis, Indiana
- WTVY in Dothan, Alabama
- WWL-TV in New Orleans, Louisiana
- WYFF-DT3 in Greenville–Spartanburg, South Carolina–Asheville, North Carolina

=== Formerly affiliated ===
- KBST-TV/KEDY-TV/KWAB-TV (now KCWO) in Big Spring, Texas (1956–1969)
  - Was a satellite of KDUB-TV (now KLBK-TV) in Lubbock, Texas (1956−1961)
    and KPAR-TV (now KTXS-TV) in Sweetwater, Texas (1961−1969)
- KDFW in Dallas/Fort Worth, Texas (1949–1995)
- KGBT-TV in Harlingen, Texas (1953–2020)
- KVEO-DT2 in Brownsville, Texas (cable channel; broadcasts on channel 23.2; was branded as CBS 4 from 2020–2026)
- KXJB-TV (now KRDK-TV) in Fargo–Valley City, North Dakota (1954–2014)
- KXLY-TV in Spokane, Washington (1953–1976)
- WJXT in Jacksonville, Florida (1949–2002)
- WOAY-TV in Oak Hill, West Virginia (1959–1967)
- WTVJ in Miami, Florida (1949–1989)
