= KTXT =

KTXT may refer to:

- KTXT-FM, a radio station (88.1 FM) licensed to Lubbock, Texas, United States
- KTTZ-TV, a television station (channel 39 digital) licensed to Lubbock, Texas, United States, which used the call sign KTXT-TV from 1962 to 2012
