= ABC 12 =

ABC 12 may refer to one of the following television stations in the United States:

== Current affiliates ==
- KBMT in Beaumont–Port Arthur, Texas
- KDRV in Medford, Oregon
- KODE-TV in Joplin, Missouri
- KSAT-TV in San Antonio, Texas
- KSGW-TV in Sheridan, Wyoming
  - Re-broadcast of KOTA-TV in Rapid City, South Dakota
- KTXS-TV in Sweetwater–Abilene, Texas
- KVIH-TV in Clovis, New Mexico
  - Re-broadcast of KVII-TV, in Amarillo, Texas
- WBOY-DT2 in Clarksburg–Weston, West Virginia
- WCTI-TV in New Bern–Greenville–Washington, North Carolina
- WISN-TV in Milwaukee, Wisconsin
- WJRT-TV in Flint–Saginaw–Bay City, Michigan, which uses the abc12.com website

== Formerly affiliated ==
- KGNS-DT2 in Laredo, TX (briefly branded as NGNS 12 in 2014)
- KLOR-TV in Portland, Oregon (1955–1956)
- KPTV in Portland, Oregon (1959–1964)
- KVLF-TV in Alpine, Texas (1961–1963)
  - Was a semi-satellite of KVKM-TV in Monahans, Texas (now KWES-TV in Odessa)
- WEAT-TV/WPEC in West Palm Beach, Florida (1955–1989)
- WKRC-TV in Cincinnati, Ohio (1961–1996)
- WPRO-TV/WPRI-TV in Providence, Rhode Island (1977–1995)
- WRVA-TV (now WWBT) in Richmond, Virginia (1960–1965)
- WTLV in Jacksonville, Florida (1980–1988)
