= Hollywood Girl =

Hollywood Girl or Hollywood Girls may refer to:

- "Hollywood Girl", a song by Drake Bell from his 2005 album Telegraph (album)
- "Holywood Girl", a song by English singer Lee Hutton during the 2011 Dansk Melodi Grand Prix in a bid to represent Denmark in the Eurovision Song Contest
- Hollywood Girls, full title Hollywood Girls: Une nouvelle vie en Californie, a French television drama series on NRJ12
- "HollywoodGirl", A techno producer and dj from Calgary, Canada, featured on the 2016 Love Parade compilation cd on EME records.
- Hollywood Girls Night, American reality television series that aired on the TV Guide Network in 2011-2012
