= KNCH =

Public radio station in San Angelo, Texas

- San Angelo, Texas; United States
- Broadcast area: Concho Valley
- Frequency: 90.1 MHz
- Branding: Texas Tech Public Media

Programming
- Language: English
- Format: Public radio
- Affiliations: National Public Radio; Public Radio Exchange; American Public Media

Ownership
- Owner: Texas Tech University
- Sister stations: Radio: KTTZ-FM; KTXT-FM; TV: KCOS; KTTZ-TV

History
- First air date: 1996
- Former call signs: KUTX (1995–2010)
- Call sign meaning: Concho Valley

Technical information
- Licensing authority: FCC
- Facility ID: 9776
- Class: C2
- ERP: 6,000 watts
- HAAT: 250 meters (820 ft)
- Transmitter coordinates: 31°35′21.6″N 100°31′1.4″W

Links
- Public license information: Public file; LMS
- Webcast: Listen live
- Website: knch.org

KNCH (90.1 MHz) is the National Public Radio station for the Concho Valley of west-central Texas. Licensed to San Angelo, it is owned by Texas Tech University and operated out of the Texas Tech University Public Media Building on the corner of 18th Street and Indiana Avenue on the university's campus in Lubbock.

The station first signed on in 1996 as KUTX, owned by the University of Texas as a sister station to KUT in Austin. Its arrival brought public radio to one of the few areas in the nation that didn't have a clear signal from a public radio station. The station was a straight simulcast of KUT, with no local programming.

In 2007, however, UT began discussions about selling KUTX to Texas Tech. At the time, Angelo State University was in the process of joining the Texas Tech University System, and UT officials thought KUTX would be a perfect complement. The sale closed in December 2009. Texas Tech officially took control in April 2010 and changed the callsign to the current KNCH. Texas Tech transitioned the format news blended with classical music.
