= KVLF =

KVLF may refer to:

- KVLF (AM), a radio station (1240 AM) licensed to serve Alpine, Texas, United States
- KVLF-TV, a defunct television station (channel 12) formerly licensed to serve Alpine, Texas
