= KMDF-LD =

Television station in Midland, Texas

- Midland–Odessa, Texas; United States
- City: Midland, Texas
- Channels: Digital: 22 (UHF); Virtual: 22

Programming
- Affiliations: 22.1: 365BLK; 22.2: Cozi TV; 22.3: Corner Store TV

Ownership
- Owner: Gray Media; (Gray Television Licensee, LLC)
- Sister stations: KOSA-TV, KCWO-TV, KWWT, KTLE-LD

History
- Founded: June 10, 2005
- First air date: July 7, 2008
- Former call signs: K54JR (2005–2009); K22IZ (2009–2012); KMDF-LP (2012–2016)
- Former channel numbers: Analog: 54 (UHF, 2005–2009), 22 (UHF, 2009–2016); Virtual: 30.5 (until 2021)
- Former affiliations: As a KWWT translator: The CW (via The CW Plus, 2008–2013); MeTV (2013–2020); As a standalone station: Cozi TV (2020–2021); Antenna TV (2021–2024)

Technical information
- Licensing authority: FCC
- Facility ID: 127009
- Class: LD
- ERP: 15 kW
- HAAT: 99.1 m (325 ft)
- Transmitter coordinates: 31°53′50.3″N 102°20′15.5″W

Links
- Public license information: LMS

KMDF-LD (channel 22) is a low-power television station licensed to Midland, Texas, United States, serving the Permian Basin area as an affiliate of the digital multicast network 365BLK. It is owned by Gray Media alongside KOSA-TV (channel 7), KWWT (channel 30), KCWO-TV (channel 4), and KTLE-LD (channel 20). The five stations share studios inside the Music City Mall on East 42nd Street in Odessa, with a secondary studio and news bureau in downtown Midland; KMDF-LD's transmitter sits adjacent to the Music City Mall.

== Subchannels ==
The station's signal is multiplexed:

Subchannels of KMDF-LD
Channel	Res.	Short name	Programming
22.1	480i	The 365	365BLK (4:3)
22.2	480i	Cozi	Cozi TV (4:3)
22.3	480i	Corner	Corner Store TV (4:3)
