= Making News: Texas Style =

- Genre: Reality television
- Directed by: Steve Bronstein
- Starring: KOSA-TV Staff
- Country of origin: United States
- Original language: English
- No. of seasons: 1
- No. of episodes: 13

Production
- Executive producer: Nick Davis
- Producer: Nick Davis Productions
- Production location: Odessa, Texas
- Running time: 60 Minutes

Original release
- Network: TV Guide Network
- Release: June 11 – September 23, 2007

Related
- Making News: Savannah Style

Making News: Texas Style was a 2007 TV Guide Network reality television series based in the Midland/Odessa, Texas Metro area, following the work lives of the anchors and reporters at KOSA-TV, the local CBS affiliate in the nation's 159th-ranked media market. The show aired on Monday nights at 8/7C on the TV Guide Network.

== Production ==
The program was taped at KOSA's studio at Music City Mall, which is owned by KOSA's parent company and is located in Odessa, contrary to the title sequence.

The series featured stories from Odessa and Midland as well as Goldsmith and Pecos. Sometimes, news anchors at rival station KWES-TV, the market's local NBC affiliate, were followed, but not as frequently.

== Reception ==
The series marked the shifting priorities of the TV Guide Network as it "veered harder into entertainment" and "extended the channel's thematic interest in television." The series was described as a ratings success for the network, doubling its average primetime household rating and leading to a 2008 spinoff series set in Savannah, Georgia.

Writing for Texas Monthly, TV critic Christopher Kelly compared the program to mockumentaries like Waiting for Guffman, calling it " a witty, insightful, and even touching look at a television station that’s probably not much bigger than your average high school AV club" and said the show "blows to smithereens every last stereotype of small-minded, small-town Texas." New York Daily News critic Richard Huff said that the series was "fun to watch", but he thought that it largely confirmed the stereotypes of local television news as "cheesy, overwrought and sensational".

== Cast ==
*The cast is listed by appearance in theme sequence*

- Jay Hendricks- Anchor
- Kara Lee- Reporter
- Jose Gaona - News Director
- Tatum Hubbard- Anchor (listed as Co-Anchor in first two episodes)
- Gary Williams Jr.- Producer
- Melissa Correa- Reporter
- Bill Warren- Anchor (Dropped as Anchor in second episode, Listed as Reporter in third)*Not Listed in title sequence and appeared on show*
- Craig Stewart- Weather Director
- Greg Morgan- meteorologist
- Jeff Stewart- Sports Director
- Mike Barker- Anchor
- Javi Perez - Sports Reporter
- Catherine Collins - Reporter
- Armando Saldivar - Reporter
- Krista Escamilla - Morning Anchor
- Eddie Garcia - Reporter
- Allyson Powell - Reporter

The entire KOSA news team can be found here: KOSA-TV Staff

== See also ==
- Making News: Savannah Style (2008 spinoff)
