= Channel 14 branded TV stations in the United States =

The following television stations in the United States are branded as channel 14 (though neither using virtual channel 14 nor broadcasting on physical RF channel 14):

- WCBD-DT2 in Charleston, South Carolina
- WREX-DT2 in Rockford, Illinois

The following television stations in the United States formerly branded as channel 14:

- KWWT in Odessa, Texas
