= KAMC =

Television station in Lubbock, Texas

- Lubbock, Texas; United States
- Channels: Digital: 27 (UHF); Virtual: 28
- Branding: KAMC; KAMC News

Programming
- Affiliations: 28.1: ABC; for others, see § Subchannels

Ownership
- Owner: Mission Broadcasting, Inc.
- Operator: Nexstar Media Group via LMA
- Sister stations: KLBK-TV

History
- First air date: November 11, 1968
- Former call signs: KJJJ-TV (CP, 1966–1968); KSEL-TV (1968–1974); KMCC (1974–1979)
- Former channel numbers: Analog: 28 (UHF, 1968–2009)
- Former affiliations: Independent (1968–1969)
- Call sign meaning: Phonetically sounded out as "Kay-Mac" (station was founded by McAlister family); intended to be KMAC in 1975, but a San Antonio radio station held them at the time

Technical information
- Licensing authority: FCC
- Facility ID: 40820
- ERP: 1,000 kW
- HAAT: 231 m (758 ft)
- Transmitter coordinates: 33°31′33.8″N 101°52′8.6″W

Links
- Public license information: Public file; LMS
- Website: www.everythinglubbock.com

KAMC (channel 28) is a television station in Lubbock, Texas, United States, affiliated with ABC. It is owned by Mission Broadcasting, which maintains a local marketing agreement (LMA) with Nexstar Media Group, owner of CBS affiliate KLBK-TV (channel 13), for the provision of certain services. The two stations share studios on University Avenue in south Lubbock, where KAMC's transmitter is also located.

== History ==
KAMC first began broadcasting in the fall of 1968 as KSEL-TV. Originally an independent station, KSEL soon began broadcasting some ABC programming which was previously split between CBS affiliate KLBK and NBC affiliate KCBD (channel 11). After a few months of sharing secondary affiliations with the local CBS and NBC affiliates, KSEL became the primary and exclusive ABC affiliate for the Lubbock market in the fall of 1969. While KSEL was the fourth television station to launch in Lubbock in 16 years (including PBS outlet KTXT-TV (now KTTZ-TV channel 5), it took the market 17 years for all three major commercial television networks to gain full-time affiliations.

KSEL-TV entered as a competitor to the established KLBK and KCBD, and recent sign-on (and, with regard to signal, weaker) channel 34, KKBC-TV (later KMXN-TV). KKBC operated from 1967 to 1973. A new channel 34, KJAA, signed on in 1981; it is now Fox affiliate KJTV-TV.

KSEL drew resources from sister stations KSEL (950 AM, now KTTU) and KSEL-FM (93.7, now KLBB-FM). The stations had unified sales staffs (spots were sold on both radio and TV by one sales force, which often voiced spots or appeared in commercials or as on camera talent, i.e., Bill Maddox was sales manager and late news anchor). All stations were owned by R. B. "Mac" McAlister, his son Bill, and the department heads at the stations (A. C. "Ace" Wimberly, Bill Maddox, Lew Dee, Bill Baker, etc.), with its future call signs being both in honor of the McAlister family.

KSEL filled air time with many movies, each accompanied by an on camera host. The late Lew Dee (1935–2011), also known as Lewis T. D'Elia, hosted a movie show, in addition to co-hosting This, That and the Other on radio and KSEL-TV. The news department gathered and delivered news for all three stations.

The old KAMC studios, which later housed the transmitter. Since the analog to digital TV conversion this site has not been used by KAMC.

The radio stations were sold to other interests in 1974–75, and moved out of the shared building at 1201 84th Street in south Lubbock (in picture), though the FM transmitter remained at this site until sold to the Ramar interests (and moved to new KJTV-TV tower in 2009); KSEL-TV continued to broadcast from the same studios afterwards for decades. KSEL-TV changed its call sign to KMCC and invested in better equipment (RCA TCR-100 video cartridge player) and programming, including M*A*S*H reruns. Between growth of ABC's ratings in the late 1970s, an improving news operation, and the syndicated product, the station became a real player in the early 1980s.

A satellite station was added in 1979. KFDW-TV, channel 12 in Clovis, New Mexico, had been a satellite station of KFDA-TV in Amarillo for many years, under the same ownership (once the Bass Brothers) from 1966 to 1976 and under Mel Wheeler from 1976 to 1979. The McAlisters changed KFDW's call sign to KAMC, which triggered a complaint from NBC affiliate KAMR-TV, which was carried on cable systems in Clovis. The call signs were exchanged: the repeater in Clovis took the KMCC calls, while channel 28 in Lubbock became KAMC. Channel 12 is now KVIH-TV, a satellite station of KVII-TV; it was sold in 1986 as part of KAMC's financial restructuring. (KMCC is now the callsign for an unrelated station in Laughlin, Nevada.)

Bill McAlister, who served as Lubbock's mayor in the early 1980s, died in 1983. Eight years later, in an effort to make the station more profitable, McAlister's son Greg took over the station before selling it in 1999 to VHR Broadcasting. Jeff Klotzman, who spent much of the late 1970s and almost all of the 1980s as an anchor/reporter and now works at KJTV-TV, wrote in 2000 that KAMC's position as a distant third (behind KCBD and KLBK) and "low prices for cotton and other agricultural commodities, which were Lubbock's economic base" as some of the primary factors hurting the station's financial situation.

For much of the late 1970s and all of the 1980s, KAMC had used the Action News branding for its newscasts. However, in September 1991, the station retired this news branding and reintroduced the News 28 branding in an attempt to shake up its newscasts and more robustly compete with KCBD's and KLBK's newscasts. KAMC would use the News 28 branding until 1997; it had been used during a brief period during the mid-to-late 1970s, when the station had the KMCC call sign.

Beginning with the 1986–87 season, KAMC began using Stephen Arnold's "Spirit" news music that had been used at its fellow ABC affiliate in Dallas before briefly jettisoning it in favor of a news theme in late 1989 that was likely produced in-house. They reused the "Spirit" news theme when they jettisoned the "Action News" branding in favor of "News 28" in late 1991. This time, they used the cut of the "Spirit" news music used in Dallas since 1987. They discontinued the "Spirit" news music in mid-1995 in favor of "The One and Only". KAMC used "The One and Only" until mid-2009.

VHR Broadcasting sold KAMC to Mission Broadcasting in late 2003 as part of Nexstar Broadcasting Group's purchase of Quorum Broadcasting; since most Mission stations have local marketing agreements with Nexstar stations in the same market, this paired KAMC with KLBK-TV. Not long after Mission's acquisition, KAMC relocated its operations from its longtime 84th Street studios and moved into studios originally long occupied by KLBK.

== News operation ==
KAMC's news coverage centers around the city of Lubbock and across the South Plains region of West Texas. Newscasts air weekday mornings from 5 to 7 a.m., 11 a.m. and weeknights at 5, 6 and 10 p.m. Saturday night newscasts air at 6 and 10 p.m. Only one newscast airs on Sunday nights at 10 p.m. In July 2013, the station became the fourth news operation in Lubbock to begin broadcasting all newscasts in high definition. On that day the station debuted its newly constructed sets, updated branding and image and a new state of the art weather graphics system from WSI. In April 2014, the station debuted a new half-hour midday newscast that airs weekday mornings at 11 a.m.

== Technical information ==
=== Subchannels ===
The station's signal is multiplexed:

Subchannels of KAMC
Channel	Res.	Short name	Programming
28.1	720p	KAMC-DT	ABC
28.2	480i	Mystery	Ion Mystery
28.3	480i	Bounce	Bounce TV
28.4	480i	Oxygen	Oxygen

On June 15, 2016, Nexstar announced that it has entered into an affiliation agreement with Katz Broadcasting for the Escape (now Ion Mystery), Laff, Grit, and Bounce TV networks (the last one of which is owned by Bounce Media LLC, whose COO Jonathan Katz is president/CEO of Katz Broadcasting), bringing one or more of the four networks to 81 stations owned and/or operated by Nexstar, including KAMC.

=== Analog-to-digital conversion ===
KAMC shut down its analog signal, over UHF channel 28, on February 17, 2009, the original target date on which full-power television stations in the United States were to transition from analog to digital broadcasts under federal mandate (which was later pushed back to June 12, 2009). The station's digital signal remained on its pre-transition UHF channel 27, using virtual channel 28.
