= KTLE-LD =

Television station in Odessa, Texas

- Odessa–Midland, Texas; United States
- City: Odessa, Texas
- Channels: Digital: 20 (UHF); Virtual: 20
- Branding: Telemundo 20

Programming
- Affiliations: 20.1: Telemundo; for others, see § Subchannels

Ownership
- Owner: Gray Television; (Gray Television Licensee, LLC)
- Sister stations: KOSA-TV, KCWO-TV, KWWT, KMDF-LD

History
- Founded: August 23, 1989
- First air date: April 19, 1991
- Former call signs: K60EE (1989–2002); KTLE-LP (2002–2019)
- Former channel numbers: Analog: 60 (UHF, 1991–2002), 20 (UHF, 2002–2019); Translator: KTLD-LP 49 (UHF) Midland
- Former affiliations: MyNetworkTV (LD6, 2019−2020)
- Call sign meaning: Telemundo

Technical information
- Licensing authority: FCC
- Facility ID: 64993
- Class: LD
- ERP: 15 kW
- HAAT: 99.1 m (325 ft)
- Transmitter coordinates: 31°53′50.3″N 102°20′15.5″W
- Translator(s): KOSA-TV 7.3 Odessa; KCWO-TV 4.2 Big Spring

Links
- Public license information: LMS
- Website: www.sutelemundo20.com

KTLE-LD (channel 20) is a low-power television station licensed to Odessa, Texas, United States, serving the Permian Basin area as an affiliate of the Spanish-language network Telemundo. It is owned by Gray Media alongside CBS affiliate KOSA-TV (channel 7), KWWT (channel 30), an independent station with MyNetworkTV, CW+ affiliate KCWO-TV (channel 4), and low-power 365BLK affiliate KMDF-LD (channel 22). The five stations share studios inside the Music City Mall on East 42nd Street in Odessa, with a secondary studio and news bureau in downtown Midland; KTLE-LD's transmitter sits adjacent to the Music City Mall.

Even though KTLE-LD has a digital signal of its own, the low-power broadcast range only covers the immediate Midland–Odessa area. Therefore, the station is simulcast in 16:9 widescreen standard definition on KOSA-TV's third digital subchannel from a transmitter on FM 866 west of Odessa. Until 2014, KTLE's programming was also simulcast on KTLD-LP (channel 49) in Midland.

== History ==
KTLE-LP began as a construction permit granted to Telemundo on August 23, 1989, and was licensed as K60EE, UHF channel 60, on April 19, 1991. KTLD-LP began as a construction permit granted to Brooks Broadcasting Inc. on April 29, 1988. Brooks Broadcasting sold the permit to Ronald J. Gordon in March 1989, who in turn, sold the permit to Telemundo in October 1991. The station was licensed as K49CD, UHF channel 49, on August 14, 1992.

The stations' early days were marked by uncertainty, being transferred several times as Telemundo, their owner, endured financial hardship in the mid-1990s, and at one point went into bankruptcy. In May 2001, Telemundo sold the stations, along with Amarillo station K36DV (later KTMO-LP), to Lawton, Oklahoma-based Drewry Communications, who owned NBC affiliate KWES-TV in the Midland–Odessa market. Both stations received new call letters in January 2002; K60EE became KTLE-LP, and K49CD became KTLD-LP. In April 2004, KTLE moved from channel 60 to channel 20, having been required to abandon their position in the high-700 MHz band (channels 60-69). KTLD's license was canceled by the Federal Communications Commission (FCC) on March 12, 2014.

On August 10, 2015, Raycom Media announced that it would purchase Drewry Communications for $160 million. The deal was completed on December 1, 2015.

=== Sale to Gray Television ===
On June 25, 2018, Atlanta-based Gray Television, owner of CBS affiliate KOSA-TV (channel 7), announced it had reached an agreement with Raycom to merge their respective broadcasting assets (consisting of Raycom's 63 existing owned-and/or-operated television stations, including KWES and KWAB, and Gray's 93 television stations) under Gray's corporate umbrella. The cash-and-stock merger transaction valued at $3.6 billion—in which Gray shareholders would acquire preferred stock currently held by Raycom—required divestment of either KOSA or KWES due to FCC ownership regulations prohibiting common ownership of two of the four highest-rated stations in a single market (as well as more than two stations in any market). As part of the deal, KWES was divested, but KTLE-LP was retained, with its digital simulcast moving to a subchannel of Gray's KOSA-TV. The sale was approved on December 20, and was completed on January 2, 2019. Subsequently, KTLE turned off its analog signal and began digital operations.

== Programming ==
KTLE broadcasts programming from Telemundo, but unlike most low-power television stations, it also features Spanish-language local newscasts, produced by KOSA, which air Monday through Friday at 11 a.m., 4:30 p.m., 5 p.m. and 10 p.m.

On October 10, 2022, KTLE started broadcasting a morning newscast, Noticias Telemundo Texas, which aired weekdays from 5 to 7 a.m. The program was produced out of KXTX-TV's studios in Fort Worth. The show was launched on September 26. On November 1, 2024, Noticias Telemundo Texas was discontinued.

== Subchannels ==
The station's signal is multiplexed:

Subchannels of KTLE-LD
Channel	Res.	Short name	Programming
20.1	1080i	TELHD	Telemundo
20.2	720p	TeleXit	TeleXitos
20.3	480i	ION	Ion
20.4	480i	365 BLK	365BLK
20.5	480i	LNL	News
