= KCWO-TV =

Television station in Big Spring, Texas

- Big Spring–Odessa–Midland, Texas; United States
- City: Big Spring, Texas
- Channels: Digital: 33 (UHF); Virtual: 4
- Branding: West Texas CW

Programming
- Affiliations: 4.1: CW+; 4.2: Telemundo; for others, see § Subchannels

Ownership
- Owner: Gray Media; (Gray Television Licensee, LLC)
- Sister stations: KOSA-TV, KWWT, KMDF-LD, KTLE-LD

History
- First air date: January 15, 1956
- Former call signs: KBST-TV (1956–1957); KEDY-TV (1957–1962); KWAB-TV (1962–2019)
- Former channel numbers: Analog: 4 (VHF, 1956–2009)
- Former affiliations: CBS (1956−1969); ABC (secondary, 1956−1969); KMOM-TV/KTPX/KWES-TV satellite (1969–2019)
- Call sign meaning: The CW Odessa

Technical information
- Licensing authority: FCC
- Facility ID: 42008
- ERP: 33.5 kW
- HAAT: 83.3 m (273 ft)
- Transmitter coordinates: 32°16′55.4″N 101°29′35.5″W
- Translator(s): KOSA-TV 7.2 Odessa

Links
- Public license information: Public file; LMS
- Website: westtexascw.com

KCWO-TV (channel 4) is a television station licensed to Big Spring, Texas, United States, serving the Permian Basin area as an affiliate of The CW Plus. It is owned by Gray Media alongside KOSA-TV (channel 7), KWWT (channel 30), KTLE-LD (channel 20) and KMDF-LD (channel 22). The five stations share studios inside the Music City Mall on East 42nd Street in Odessa, with a secondary studio and news bureau in downtown Midland; KCWO-TV's transmitter is located on US 87 north of Big Spring.

Until January 2019 as KWAB-TV, the station operated as a satellite of Odessa-licensed NBC affiliate KWES-TV (channel 9), then owned by Raycom Media. KWAB-TV's signal covered eastern parts of the Odessa–Midland market that received a marginal to non-existent over-the-air signal from KWES-TV, although there was significant overlap between the two stations' contours otherwise. KWAB-TV was a straight simulcast of KWES-TV; the only on-air references to the station were during Federal Communications Commission (FCC)-mandated hourly legal identifications. Aside from the transmitter, KWAB-TV/KCWO-TV does not maintain any physical presence locally in Big Spring. In conjunction with Gray's acquisition of Raycom and subsequent resale of KWES-TV to Tegna Inc., KWAB-TV was retained by Gray and converted into a stand-alone station; its main channel is simulcast in high definition on KOSA-TV's second digital subchannel to expand its broadcast range.

== History ==
KCWO began operations in January 1956 as KBST-TV, owned by the Big Spring Herald along with KBST radio (1490 AM). The station carried programming from all three networks; however, it was hampered by the presence of KMID-TV (channel 2) in Midland, which carried NBC and some ABC programming, and KOSA-TV (channel 7) in Odessa, which carried CBS, which limited KBST's network programming. Consequently, the station had little success. The radio station was eventually sold to the Snyder Corporation (co-owned by Ted Snyder, who later acquired KARN in Little Rock, Arkansas, and B. Winston Wrinkle), while a half interest in KBST-TV was transferred to Dub Rogers' Texas Telecasting, owner of KDUB-TV in Lubbock (now KLBK-TV) and part-owner of KVER-TV in Clovis, New Mexico (now KVIH-TV). Rogers then changed the call letters of the station to KEDY-TV.

The studios and tower were located at the edge of Howard College campus at 2500 Kentucky Way. Local shows were produced on and off until the late 1960s. Otherwise, KEDY largely became a semi-satellite of KDUB. In 1961, Rogers sold his stations to Grayson Enterprises. Soon afterward, the station took the KWAB callsign (for Webb Air Force Base), and switched from simulcasting KDUB to KPAR-TV (now KTXS-TV) in Sweetwater. However, both KDUB and KPAR were primarily affiliated with CBS (though KPAR also had a secondary ABC affiliation), resulting at times in KWAB duplicating KOSA. Soon after Grayson's acquisition of KVKM-TV (now KWES-TV) in 1969, KWAB began to simulcast that station, alleviating the duplication.

Grayson Enterprises ran into license renewal trouble in 1968, 1971, 1974, and 1977 for some of its stations. These stations were accused of fraudulent billing, program and transmitter log fabrication, main studio violations, failure to make required technical tests, and other issues. The stations had their renewals deferred and hearings ordered as a result.

The case was settled in what was then described as a "distress sale", in which Grayson's stations were broken up and sold to minority-controlled groups at a reduced price. The parameters of such a sale were defined by this sell-off. As a result, Grayson sold both stations to Permian Basin Television Corporation in 1980.

KWES/KWAB swapped affiliations with KMID on September 5, 1982, and joined NBC. Permian Basin Television sold KWES and KWAB to MSP Television in 1985. Drewry Communications bought the stations in 1991. Drewry had planned to sell its stations to London Broadcasting in 2008; however, by January 2009, the deal fell through.

For many years, the stations did some Big Spring production, most of which aired on a delayed basis. Today in Big Spring was recorded in Big Spring and fed back to the Midland studios over the company microwave system. This microwave link proved pivotal for KWES during the February 2008 Alon USA refinery explosion, allowing the station to provide live skycam images and live pictures in the hours immediately after the blast.

KWES/KWAB lost rights to LATV on December 29, 2013, but they were able to gain the rights to The CW from KWWT. On June 12, 2014, KWES/KWAB's CW feed was made available to local Dish Network subscribers on Channel 10.

On August 10, 2015, Raycom Media announced that it would purchase Drewry Communications for $160 million. The sale was completed on December 1.

On June 25, 2018, Gray Television announced it had reached an agreement with Raycom to merge their respective broadcasting assets (consisting of Raycom's 63 existing owned-and/or-operated television stations, including KWES and KWAB, and Gray's 93 television stations) under Gray's corporate umbrella. The cash-and-stock merger transaction valued at $3.6 billion—in which Gray shareholders would acquire preferred stock held by Raycom—required divestment of either KWES or KOSA due to FCC ownership regulations prohibiting common ownership of two of the four highest-rated stations in a single market (as well as more than two stations in any market). Gray announced it would retain KOSA, and sell KWES to an unrelated third party. On August 20, it was announced that Tegna Inc. would buy KWES and sister station WTOL in Toledo, Ohio, for $105 million. KWAB would be retained and converted to a CW+ affiliate, with a simulcast on KOSA's second digital subchannel. The sale was completed on January 2, 2019. Upon completion of the sale, the call letters were changed to KCWO (the "-TV" suffix was added on February 26, 2019).

== Technical information ==
=== Subchannels ===
The station's signal is multiplexed:

Subchannels of KCWO-TV
Subchannel	Res.	Short name	Programming
4.1	720p	KCWO-TV	CW+
4.2	1080i	KTLE	Telemundo (KTLE-LD)
4.3	480i	ION-SD	Ion (KTLE-LD)
4.4	480i	CO-SD	365BLK (KMDF-LD)

Simulcast of subchannels of another station

=== Analog-to-digital conversion ===
KCWO (as KWAB) shut down its analog signal, over VHF channel 4, on June 12, 2009, the official date on which full-power television stations in the United States transitioned from analog to digital broadcasts under federal mandate. The station's digital signal remained on its pre-transition UHF channel 33, using virtual channel 4.
