= Making News: Savannah Style =

- Genre: Reality TV
- Starring: WJCL/WTGS staff
- Country of origin: United States
- Original language: English
- No. of seasons: 1
- No. of episodes: 13

Production
- Executive producer: Nick Davis
- Producer: Nick Davis Productions
- Production location: Savannah, Georgia
- Running time: 60 Minutes

Original release
- Network: TV Guide Network
- Release: June 4 – September 10, 2008

Related
- Making News: Texas Style

Making News: Savannah Style was a reality program set at the duopoly of WJCL and WTGS in Savannah, Georgia. It followed the daily activities of the lowest-rated news department in the Savannah television market. The show was the second in the Making News series, following Making News: Texas Style, which aired during Summer 2007. The first season of Making News was the TV Guide Network's highest-rated original series. Making News: Savannah Style started taping in December 2007, and moved the setting from the first season's small town Texas market to Savannah, the country's 97th market in size, and to an underfunded, outdated news operation that was stated to be the lowest-rated ABC affiliate in the country. The show also mentioned competing stations WTOC (which, in contrast to channels 22 and 28, has the highest-rated news department in the market) and WSAV-TV.
