= KTXT-FM =

Student radio station at Texas Tech University

- Lubbock, Texas; United States
- Broadcast area: Lubbock metro area
- Frequency: 88.1 MHz
- Branding: 88.1 The Raider

Programming
- Language: English
- Format: Non-commercial educational

Ownership
- Owner: Texas Tech University
- Sister stations: Radio: KNCH; KTTZ-FM; TV: KCOS; KTTZ-TV

History
- Founded: 1959
- First air date: February 5, 1961 (at 91.9)
- Former frequencies: 91.9 MHz (1961–1978)
- Call sign meaning: Texas Tech

Technical information
- Licensing authority: FCC
- Facility ID: 65352
- Class: C2
- ERP: 35,000 watts
- HAAT: 129 meters (423 ft)
- Transmitter coordinates: 33°34′55.3″N 101°53′26.6″W

Links
- Public license information: Public file; LMS
- Webcast: Listen live
- Website: Official Website

KTXT-FM (88.1 MHz, "88.1 The Raider") is a non-commercial educational college radio station licensed to Texas Tech University in Lubbock, Texas, United States. KTXT-FM is licensed to broadcast 35,000 watts of power to Lubbock and the surrounding South Plains of West Texas.

== History ==
Early support for a college radio station at Texas Tech was expressed in 1949 in the editorial pages of the campus newspaper. Such a station was considered a "necessity" for the education of students in the growing field of broadcasting, and as a means of staying competitive against other colleges. The Tech Radio Club, for students interested in experimental and amateur radio, was organized in late 1948 while the Tech Broadcasting Club was organized in late 1949 for students interested in "…announcing, acting, writing or working with sound effects." In the Fall of 1949, the Speech Department adds sports writing and a radio course to its curriculum and installs radio equipment of "broadcast quality" in its studios in the Speech Building. Also that Fall, the student body president announces that plans are underway for a campus radio station to be operational by late 1950, and "…will be strictly confined to the campus buildings and dormitories in its sending powers." Despite the lack of a campus radio station, students from the Broadcasting Club and radio classes produce programs that are broadcast on various commercial radio stations in Lubbock including KCBD, KFYO and KSEL.

Texas Tech's first radio station wasn’t a true broadcast radio station, but a carrier current station, where a low-power AM signal is sent to receivers through a building's electrical wiring. Signal reception was limited to receivers either plugged directly into the building's electrical system or placed close enough to the power lines which would act as a leaky feeder. The signal was limited to the building in which it was broadcast, because the electrical transformers and switch gear that supplied electricity to the building, would prevent the signal being passed elsewhere. Additional wiring had to be run directly to other buildings for the signal to be heard in them. Carrier current stations are not licensed by the FCC, but operate under the Code of Federal Regulations, Title 47, Part 15 (Title 47 CFR Part 15). Such stations are not issued official call signs nor are they subject to federal regulation as commercial radio stations are. Despite their limited range, carrier current stations offer several benefits: their transmitters are rather cheap and easy to construct, they can operate on any AM frequency, and if the signal originates on the campus of an educational institution, there is theoretically no power limit. By increasing the transmitter power and using inline filters, the signal quality is improved and a greater number of buildings can be served. It was these qualities that made carrier current stations quite popular among many educational institutions throughout the 1950s, including Texas Tech.

In October 1950, two groups of students, one from Sneed Hall and the other from what was then called Men's Dorm III (Gordon Hall) started building carrier-current radio transmitters. The first system was installed and operated from Men's Dorm III (Gordon Hall) and preliminary tests conducted for a multi-dormitory system. A second system was built and installed in the basement of Sneed Hall. Combining their efforts, they organize Tech Broadcasting System, and with sponsorship by Texas Tech vice president E. N. Jones, they seek formal recognition as a campus student group. Texas Tech's first campus radio station, MD2 (Men's Dorm II), operates from the social director's office in the basement of Sneed Hall. The station broadcasts on 750 kHz at a power of 25watts, with reception limited to Sneed and West Halls. Initial programming consists of broadcasting music from records donated by students from Sneed Hall, and from local commercial station KSEL. By March 1951, additional cabling is installed which expands the signal to seven of Texas Tech's then eight dormitories, Drane Hall being the exception as its student census was very low at the time. The station cannot be heard off-campus.

Although unlicensed, the station was operated as if it were a licensed commercial radio station, so a new name is created for it. Tech Broadcasting System creates the unofficial call letters KTTC. The new name is in keeping with commercial station call letters around the area that all start with K, and it stands for Texas Tech College. KTTC is used for the very first time during a broadcast on April 10, 1951. The station operates from 7pm to 11pm, Monday through Friday with music programs consisting of Western, Popular and Classical music. 15 students, "…including 2 girls", act as DJs for the station.

In February 1952, new wiring was installed that connected the studios in the Speech Building to the KTTC head-end in Drane Hall. This allowed various interviews and dramas to be broadcast from the studios in the Speech Building. A year later, the head-end of KTTC would be moved to the Speech Building and its operational frequency changed to 650 kHz.

One major advantage that carrier-current stations had over their licensed counterparts was the ability to change operating frequencies to suit the needs of the moment, something that KTTC did with some regularity in its early years. From its start in 1950, KTTC operated at 750 kHz and continued at that spot on the radio dial until late 1952. The station moved to 650 kHz in early 1953, then was found at 1460 kHz that Fall. The station took advantage of the fact that a popular local commercial radio station, KVSP-AM operating at 1460 kHz, would sign-off around 7pm. KTTC would then begin its evening programming on 1460 at 7pm, in effect "carrying over" KVSP's campus audience without them having to change the dial on the radio. 1954 found KTTC using 3 different frequencies over the year, operating at 600 in the Spring, 650 in the early Fall and 655 by year's end. 655 kHz then became the fixed standard to find KTTC on the radio dial from early 1955 until its operational end sometime in 1960.

The original transmitter, antenna, and studios were located in the speech building and after the late seventies in the journalism building. The antenna and transmitter moved to the channel five KTXT-TV at the west end of the campus sometime after TV's inception in 1962. Though power remained low, the antenna stood at a height of 272 feet (83 m).

In the late 1960s or early 1970s, the station applied for and received a construction permit for an increase to 18,500 watts at 340 feet (100 m), proposing the KTXT tower. This was extended a number of times, because of changes in plans, changes in budgets (which mostly the station did not have) and the discovery (after the big Lubbock tornado of 5-11-1970) or realization that the tower was too light and too damaged to carry the additional weight and wind load of the bigger FM station antenna. In late 1978, the station relocated to the 98th and University tower owned by Ray Moran interests (101.1 KTEZ in those days, now ch 34 KJTV).

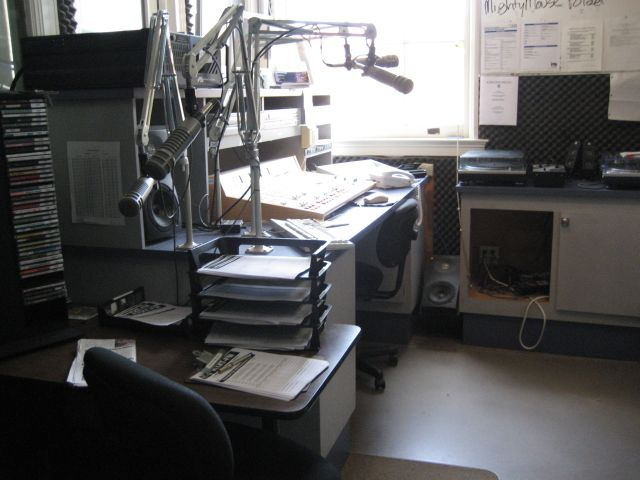
KTXT studio

In the early 1980s, KTXT-FM offered an eclectic mix of alternative programming ranging from oldies, new wave-80s, and reggae to house/trance, rock, country and indie. The 1980s led the way to the introduction of reggae music to the South Plains area. Reggae bands were booked in local clubs as a result and Lubbock experienced a boom in world music influence locally. As with all college radio during the 1980s, KTXT-FM was responsible for expanding the minds and opening the ears to the sounds of up-and-coming bands like R.E.M., U2, and The Clash. While other stations in Lubbock stuck with the Chart Hits Radio (CHR) radio format, KTXT-FM drew many listeners away from commercial radio with their alternative programming, thus forcing the commercial stations to pay attention to KTXT's playlists and DJs. Many veteran DJs can claim KTXT-FM as their first home on the air and are currently employed throughout the US as a result.

In February 1999, 88.1 became the first Lubbock FM station to broadcast on the Internet via a live audio feed.

Among the earliest broadcast equipment used included a 5,000-watt Gates FM-5H2 transmitter donated by Pat Patillo (old and longtime chief engineer of KTXT-TV), new feed line, and an eight-bay antenna. The old frequency of 91.9 could not be used for a very high power level because it would conflict with the use of another channel assigned to Lubbock (102.5) that was open for applications in those days. The new frequency used was 88.1. This proved to be a good news/bad news combination. Sister station KTXT-TV was carried on cable television on channel 6 where the sound frequency is about 87.7 MHz. At some locations near the new FM tower, there was KTXT-FM audio heard where the KTXT-TV sound should have been. The FM operated at reduced power for a time as negotiations between the sister stations went on.

In the early 1980s, the owner of KAMR-TV in Amarillo, Texas, a Texas Tech alumnus, donated their old broadcast tower to Texas Tech. This used (albeit newer and taller) tower replaced KTXT-TV's old tower and the KTXT-FM antenna was moved back to the Tech campus. When Texas Tech assumed control of the KOHM-FM broadcast license from the Lubbock Independent School District, it too moved to the campus.

Until 2001, KTXT-FM had been run under the auspices of the School of Mass Communications at Texas Tech University. At the time, Mass Comm was redirecting its media efforts from radio to various multimedia platforms. KTXT-FM's faculty adviser, Dr. Clive Kinghorn, retired in the fall of 2001, and control of the station was transferred to Student Media that September.

Former KTXT-FM logo

The broadcast transmitters of all three stations, KTXT-TV, KTXT-FM and KOHM-FM, were housed in the same transmitter building until July 2003 when a new transmitter building for the radio stations was completed. The conversion of KTXT-TV to a digital television station required this new facility. At some point, the Gates transmitter KTXT-FM had been using was replaced by a Broadcast Electronics FM10B, rated to 12 kW. The BE transmitter was moved into the new facility and was eventually replaced in 2007 by a new, state-of-the-art solid-state Nautel Q10 transmitter.

Around 2007, a tower crew was welding stiffeners to the cross-members of the KTXT-TV tower in order to strengthen it for the heavier load an added digital TV antenna would require. It was during this work that the KTXT-FM antenna was significantly damaged. The antenna was eventually replaced by an antenna donated by Clear Channel Communications of Lubbock. The donated antenna was formerly used by 98 Kool (KCCL-FM), and was sent to the factory, refurbished and re-tuned for 88.1.

In 2012 the new KTXT logo was designed by a Texas Tech graphic design student, Nicholas Ryan Vatzlavick while working at the College of Mass Communications (now College of Media and Communications).

In 2020, Malone Graham and Branson Nash took over the sports department.

In 2021, Vanessa Hakizimana took over as sports department head. Collin Lee, Nathanael Boles, and Christian Hay became the new sports reporters/commentators.

== Cessation and return ==
KTXT-FM abruptly stopped broadcasting 2:35 PM CST on December 10, 2008. Student Media cited budget constraints as the reason behind the station closure. Student Media retained control of the studios, using them as offices, while the bulk of the broadcast equipment would be transferred to Texas Tech's other FM radio station, KOHM. Broadcasts from the former studios were no longer possible after December 10, and KTXT-FM was off the air.

Control of KTXT-FM was transferred to KOHM-FM (Now KTTZ-FM) in January 2009. Relocation of the microwave studio/transmitter links to the KOHM studios were completed in early May 2009, and test broadcasts were conducted. KTXT-FM returned to the air in late May with a broadcast schedule consisting mainly of network programming via satellite. The lack of proper studio facilities has been cited by KOHM management as the reason for KTXT-FM's automated/unattended operation. KOHM/KTTZ station management had expressed a long-term goal of returning students to the operation of KTXT-FM.

On July 1, 2012, KTXT-FM was once again belting out alternative/college hits. KTXT-FM is once again operated by the College of Mass Communications. As of this date the station has returned, with students said to be running the station. New studios, equipment, and offices are being installed in the Mass Communications Building. (Former Business Administration Building)

== Ownership ==
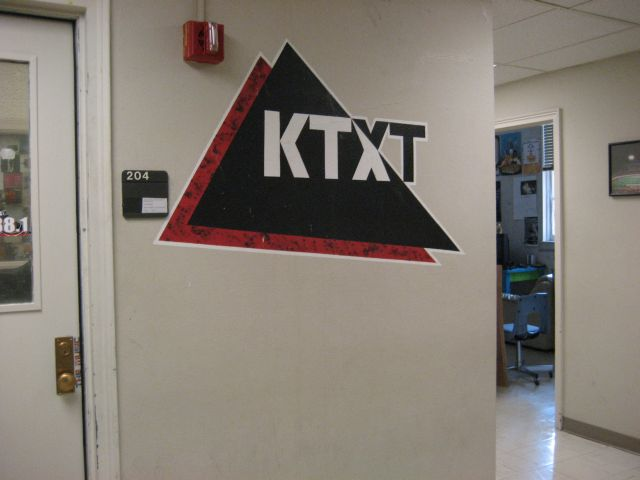
Logo in KTXT studio

KTXT-FM is owned and licensed to Texas Tech University and as of March 1, 2013 is student operated, and controlled by the College of Media and Communication., and is no longer controlled by Texas Tech Student Media, The Department of Continuing Education, KOHM-FM (now KTTZ-FM), or the Office of the Provost. From September 2001 until December 2008, KTXT-FM operated under Texas Tech Student Media. From December 2008 until March 2011, KTXT-FM was run in conjunction with KOHM-FM and reported to the Texas Tech University Office of the Provost. In March 2011, KOHM-FM, KTXT-FM (and KNCH-FM) were moved back into the Texas Tech College of Mass Communications, reporting to the Dean of that college, and coming full circle back to where they had started.

An administrative change in September 2011 resulted in both KOHM-FM and KNCH-FM being moved administratively under the Texas Tech Public Television station KTXT-TV, while KTXT-FM was kept in the College of Mass Communications. A small studio for KTXT-FM was set up in the basement of the Mass Communications building, and the Fall semester of 2011 saw the first real return of students to 88.1. In January 2012, the call letters for both KOHM-FM and KTXT-TV were changed to KTTZ-FM and KTTZ-TV respectively, leaving KTXT-FM with the university's oldest original call-letters still in use.

In August 2012, KTXT-FM, along with the College of Mass Communications, relocated to the newly renovated Business Administration building located at 15th Street and Flint Avenue. The College also changed its name during this move and is now known as the Texas Tech University College of Media and Communication.

== Format ==
In its heyday, KTXT-FM was one of the most powerful college radio stations in the United States, operating with 35,000 watts of power. As a college radio station with an Alternative music format, KTXT-FM broadcast a wide range of music genres, including dance, modern rock, R&B/hip hop, and Texas country music.

One of the best known blocks of KTXT programming was 10 pm Friday until 7 am Saturday from 1989 to 1993.

The 10 pm – 1 am block featured a program called "Shockwaves". Originally created by Craig Crafton (aka "3C") in 1988 Shockwaves featured a variety of then cutting edge techno, trance, rave, ragga, electro, ambient and house music. Crafton left the area a couple of years later and Shockwaves was then hosted full-time by Jeff Wros (aka DJ Piccadilly) who, by then, had been working under Crafton in the co-host capacity. In the final years the show added an extra hour as well as co-host Daniel Alanzo (aka DJ Daniel Dub), who became the resident house music DJ. The show ended December 13, 1993. Other late night programs included "Megahertz," a heavy metal program with the tagline, "It doesn't just hurt, it Megahertz." Weekday daytime programming included the listener request show "Power Lunch."

From 1992 to 1994, the 1 am – 4 am block was the Midnight Maniacs with Moon Doggie (Daniel Light), Master Poe (Ben Hight), Ice Troy (Troy Hollers) and Mr. Todd (Mr. Todd). This show was full of antics, great alternative music, call-ins, prizes and even an early-morning pizza delivery to one lucky listener. Then it was Shaggy and his one-man fan club keeping things going until 7 am. (Light and Hight would later have success as the Cable Ace award-winning producers and hosts of the show "Generation X". Hight who has gone on to work with numerous Lubbock stations and is now currently with TownSquare Media Lubbock station KZII FM 102.5.)

From October 2009 until June 30, 2012, KTXT's programming was all via satellite, consisting of PRI's "The TakeAway" during weekday morning drivetime, BBC World Service programming during the mid-day and afternoon, and music from the Jazz Satellite Network during overnights.

Some of the one-liners used by many of KTXT's DJs include: "Lubbock's Only Alternative", "The Couch", "Keep it locked to the left" and "Music your parents warned you about!" Or one from the 1980s, "You're all the way to the left at 88.1 KTXT-FM".

As of July 1, 2012 KTXT-FM returned to the Lubbock airwaves with the students of Texas Tech University at the helm. KTXT-FM is once again an alternative/college format, with minimal breaks for station identification
