= KTTZ-TV =

Television station in Lubbock, Texas

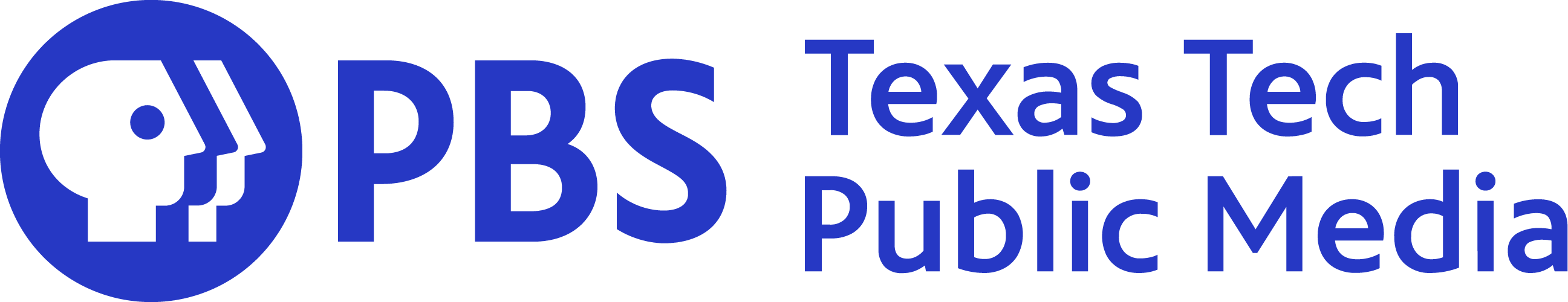
- Lubbock, Texas; United States
- Channels: Digital: 25 (UHF); Virtual: 5
- Branding: Texas Tech Public Media

Programming
- Affiliations: 5.1: PBS; 5.2: Create; 5.3: PBS Kids

Ownership
- Owner: Texas Tech University
- Sister stations: Radio: KNCH; KTTZ; KTXT; TV: KCOS

History
- First air date: October 16, 1962
- Former call signs: KTXT-TV (1962–2012)
- Former channel numbers: Analog: 5 (VHF, 1962–2009); Digital: 39 (UHF, 2009–2018)
- Former affiliations: NET (1962–1970)
- Call sign meaning: Texas Tech

Technical information
- Licensing authority: FCC
- Facility ID: 65355
- ERP: 290 kW
- HAAT: 202 m (663 ft)
- Transmitter coordinates: 33°34′55″N 101°53′27″W

Links
- Public license information: Public file; LMS
- Website: tv.kttz.org

KTTZ-TV (channel 5) is a PBS member television station in Lubbock, Texas, United States. It is owned by Texas Tech University alongside radio stations KTTZ-FM (89.1) and KTXT-FM (88.1). Operating under the umbrella branding of Texas Tech Public Media, the three outlets share studios at the corner of 18th Street and Indiana Avenue on the Texas Tech campus, adjacent to the transmitter tower shared by KTTZ-TV, KTTZ-FM and KTXT-FM.

In the past, KTTZ-TV/KTXT-TV has operated under the alternate branding of Lubbock Public Television and South Plains Public Television.

== History and facilities ==
KTTZ-TV is an open-circuit non-commercial educational television station licensed by the Federal Communications Commission (FCC). It began broadcasting on October 16, 1962. It was the network's only station in West Texas until 1978, when KCOS was established in El Paso. KCOS and KTTZ would remain the only PBS member stations in the West Texas region north of I-20 until KPBT-TV was established in Odessa in 1986, followed by KACV-TV in Amarillo in 1988.

The station's former analog channel 5 was added to the FCC table of allotments in 1952 as a commercial channel. Plains Broadcasting Company received a construction permit for channel 5 in 1953. The station planned to locate on then-rural land at 74th Street and College Avenue (now University Avenue). That site is today used for KLBK-TV (channel 13) and virtual sister station KAMC (channel 28).

KTXT-TV signed on from a converted building (the former Agriculture Pavilion) and a 452-foot (138 m) tower located at the new studios. The station installed a six-bay RCA antenna, used dual 1 5/8-inch feed lines, and a 500 watt RCA TT-500BL transmitter for an ERP of about 2,500 watts visual. In 1966, a grant bought the station a TT-6EL transmitter which raised power to 25,700 watts. In 1982–83 the station received a donated 817-foot (249 m) tower (former KAMR-TV Amarillo tower) and 12 bay antenna. This allowed the station to raise power to 60,600 watts visual. A Harris transmitter was installed in 1984 and the station converted to BTSC (stereo TV audio) operation.

KTXT has broadcast solely digitally since 4:30 p.m. on February 5, 2009. The Channel 5 analog transmitter had failed less than two weeks before the scheduled end of analog broadcasting, and the cost of repair (approximately $25,000) could not be justified.

On January 15, 2012, KTXT-TV changed its call letters to KTTZ-TV.

On August 12, 2019, TTU announced it would purchase and take over the operations of El Paso's KCOS for a token amount of $1,000, in order to preserve the market's access to PBS. All local personnel in El Paso will remain in place under the new ownership, with Texas Tech becoming the licensee and manager of that station, in addition to its existing Lubbock operations.

== Technical information ==
=== Subchannels ===
The station's signal is multiplexed:

Subchannels of KTTZ-TV
Channel	Res.	Short name	Programming
5.1	1080i	KTTZ-HD	PBS
5.2	480i	KTTZ-TV	Create
5.3	480i	KTTZ-TV	PBS Kids

=== Analog-to-digital conversion ===
KTTZ-TV (as KTXT-TV) shut down its analog signal, over VHF channel 5, at 4:30 p.m. on February 5, 2009, four months before most full-power television stations in the United States transitioned from analog to digital broadcasts under federal mandate on June 12. The station's digital signal remained on its pre-transition UHF channel 39, using virtual channel 5.

== See also ==
- KTTZ-FM
- KTXT-FM
