= KTTZ-FM =

- Lubbock, Texas; United States
- Frequency: 89.1 MHz (HD Radio)
- Branding: Texas Tech Public Media

Programming
- Format: Public radio
- Subchannels: HD2: Classical; HD3: BBC World Service
- Affiliations: NPR; PRX; APM

Ownership
- Owner: Texas Tech University
- Sister stations: KCOS; KNCH; KTTZ-TV; KTXT-FM

History
- First air date: January 1973
- Former call signs: KLSD (1973–1974); KOHM (1974–2012)
- Call sign meaning: Texas Tech

Technical information
- Licensing authority: FCC
- Facility ID: 65354
- Class: C1
- ERP: 70,000 watts
- HAAT: 173 meters (568 ft)
- Transmitter coordinates: 33°34′55.3″N 101°53′26.6″W

Links
- Public license information: Public file; LMS
- Webcast: Listen live
- Website: radio.kttz.org

KTTZ-FM (89.1 FM) is a radio station broadcasting a public radio format licensed to Lubbock, Texas, United States. The station is owned by Texas Tech University and features news radio, classical and jazz music and programming from National Public Radio.

== History ==
The station first signed on in January 1973 as KLSD, operated by the Lubbock Independent School District. After only a year on the air, it changed its calls to KOHM. This change reportedly came because school district officials were concerned about possible negative connotations with the original calls. The station's calls reflected its status as part of the school district's electronics program; an ohm is the basic SI measurement of electrical resistance.

The station operated largely hand-to-mouth for its first decade on the air. Studios were located at whatever school happened to house the electronics program during the year. It operated at 10 watts at 50 feet from 1973 to 1975, when a new transmitter was purchased and power increased to 250 watts and a 200-foot tower was built at Monterey High School, effectively limiting its coverage area to the core of the city itself. Power was raised to 3,000 watts and the tower and transmitter relocated to Dunbar High School on MLK Blvd. in 1978. By 1986, LISD realized it was in over its head operating a radio station, and was in the process of surrendering its license to the FCC.

At the same time, Texas Tech was looking to expand its radio offerings by way of a second radio frequency alongside existing station KTXT-FM. It had originally applied for 90.7 FM, but faced a fight for that frequency with an out-of-state religious group. However, KTXT's general manager, Clive Kinghorn, learned that LISD was about to give up the license for KOHM. LISD quickly agreed to sell KOHM to Texas Tech, and the station went on the air for the first time under Texas Tech's ownership on May 2, 1988. At the same time, Texas Tech activated a new, more powerful transmitter that delivered 20,000 watts of power. 1990 brought another power increase, to 50,000 watts. In 1991, the station joined NPR.

KOHM was the first radio station in Lubbock to broadcast in HD.

On January 15, 2012, the station changed its call letters to KTTZ-FM.
