= Channel 16 branded TV stations in the United States =

The following television stations in the United States brand as channel 16 (though neither using virtual channel 16 nor broadcasting on physical RF channel 16):

- KOSA-DT2 in Odessa, Texas
- WBXH-CD in Baton Rouge, Louisiana
