= KCOS (TV) =

Television station in El Paso, Texas

- El Paso, Texas; United States
- Channels: Digital: 13 (VHF); Virtual: 13
- Branding: PBS El Paso; Texas Tech Public Media

Programming
- Affiliations: 13.1: PBS; for others, see § Subchannels

Ownership
- Owner: Texas Tech University

History
- First air date: August 18, 1978
- Former channel numbers: Analog: 7 (VHF, 1978–1981), 13 (VHF, 1981–2009); Digital: 30 (UHF, until 2009)
- Call sign meaning: "City of the Sun"

Technical information
- Licensing authority: FCC
- Facility ID: 19117
- ERP: 42 kW
- HAAT: 259 m (850 ft)
- Transmitter coordinates: 31°47′15″N 106°28′49″W

Links
- Public license information: Public file; LMS
- Website: www.kcostv.org

KCOS (channel 13), branded as PBS El Paso, is a PBS member television station in El Paso, Texas, United States, owned by Texas Tech University. The station's offices are located on Viscount Boulevard (northeast of I-10) in east El Paso, and its transmitter is located atop the Franklin Mountains on the El Paso city limits. Its nominal main studio is located at Texas Tech-owned KTTZ-TV in Lubbock.

Efforts to start a public television station in El Paso had flickered on and off in the 1960s but took shape in the early 1970s with the formation of the El Paso Public Television Foundation. A construction permit for the station was issued in 1975, and KCOS began broadcasting on August 18, 1978. It originally aired on channel 7 until a July 1981 channel swap with KVIA-TV, then on channel 13; the swap was part of an agreement by which KVIA-TV donated use of its transmitter facility to the public station. KCOS persevered despite several fiscal crises and low public support. In 2019, Texas Tech Public Media absorbed KCOS, continuing to operate it as an El Paso–focused public TV station.

== History ==
=== Planning ===
Channel 7 was the originally-allocated channel for non-commercial television service in El Paso. The first discussions of starting a station to use it came in late 1962, when a group met to consider the formation of a non-profit entity to promote its establishment. This group, the Rio Grande Council on Educational Television, began raising $500,000 in order to build a transmitter site on the Franklin Mountains. However, these plans soon were put on hold, as it was felt that there were more important community projects. The Council, however, continued to exist, and in 1970 the idea met with renewed community interest.

A second organization, the El Paso Public Television Foundation (EPPTF), was formed in 1971 by a group of business leaders with the goal of establishing a public station in El Paso, one of the largest cities in the nation without public broadcasting. Under this organization, plans accelerated. The station would be located on the campus of the University of Texas at El Paso (UTEP), while fundraising and awareness-generating activities began in the community. On November 25, the foundation filed with the Federal Communications Commission (FCC) seeking a construction permit for channel 7.

In June 1972, the foundation unveiled a capital plan to raise $275,000 of community support, with the remainder of the $1 million cost coming from the federal government as well as the local and state boards of education. However, the sudden death of Thorne Shugart, vice president in charge of fundraising, caused efforts to stall. By 1974, it was hoped that the station would be on air that year if federal grant money from the Department of Health, Education, and Welfare (HEW) was received in time. That year, John Walton, owner of commercial station KELP-TV (channel 13), donated space on a new KELP-TV tower to the new public television station.

=== Construction, start-up on channel 7, and change to channel 13 ===
HEW approved the grant at the start of July 1975, though in a smaller than expected amount, and the FCC granted the construction permit on July 16. As part of the agreement with KELP-TV, both groups then proposed a channel swap, moving the public station to channel 13 and KELP-TV to channel 7; a clause in the agreement would give additional funding and technical support to the public station if the FCC approved. The idea of switching the commercial allocation from channel 13 to channel 7 had predated both stations. In 1954, Gordon McLendon, who at the time held the construction permit for channel 13, applied to the FCC for a switch and was denied; he wanted to be located between El Paso's two existing commercial stations, channel 4 and channel 9, on the dial.

Walton's donation was imperiled when he sold KELP-TV to Marsh Media, which renamed it KVIA-TV in 1976. The agreement was renegotiated with Marsh, which introduced a delay; meanwhile, EPPTF needed another $80,000 to cover startup costs. However, KVIA-TV continued to be interested in moving to channel 7, a number used by several other ABC affiliates nationally. (Note: Notably, one of these affiliates was Marsh-owned KVII-TV in Amarillo, whose news format was copied by KVIA-TV under Marsh ownership.) Construction of KCOS also took other steps in late 1977 and early 1978, as senior management was hired; KDBC-TV donated two cameras; and the station leased space at UTEP. An eight-hour telethon aired by KDBC-TV, previewing public TV programming and seeking donations to get KCOS started, helped bring the station closer to its fundraising goals.

The transmitting equipment for KCOS was transported to the Franklin Mountains in April 1978. KCOS then began broadcasting on August 18, 1978. On El Paso's cable system, KCOS programming supplanted KNME-TV from Albuquerque when the station was on the air. In December, the station debuted its first local production, the arts program De Art.

In June 1981, the FCC approved a channel swap with KVIA-TV, which took place on July 10, 1981. It was the third such exchange among VHF television stations.

=== Growth and financial crises ===
This station has lived literally for 30 years hand-to-mouth at best, and there were a number of those times in 30 years where the hand wasn't sufficiently feeding the mouth.

— Craig A. Brush, general manager of KCOS, on the station's survival in 2008

For much of its 41-year history under a community licensee, the station had to navigate persistent low rates of public support, accentuated by its location in a border city. Elaine Rosen, who chaired the El Paso Public Television Foundation board for KCOS's first nine years in operation, recalled that "El Paso is cheap" and that some in town objected to a public station with perceived "liberal" content. KCOS, as with other community-owned public stations, also was barred under Texas law from being supported by the state; this was in contrast to KRWG-TV in neighboring Las Cruces, New Mexico, whose budget is subsidized by its owner, New Mexico State University.

As a result, the station suffered occasional financial crises. In 1981, the station faced a $25,000 budget deficit, and the chairman of the foundation asked general manager John Siqueiros to produce a five-year plan for KCOS. Siqueiros resigned in 1983 as he was facing possible dismissal over poor job performance. He was replaced by John Kasdan, who came from WVPT in Virginia. Finances improved, but a decision in the late 1980s to expand the station's local program production doubled the annual budget and ultimately led to a financial crisis in 1992, when Kasdan departed KCOS. From 1990 to 1992, memberships declined by 25 percent, while support from businesses and the federal government also diminished. The El Paso Public Television Foundation analyzed merging KCOS with KRWG-TV, El Paso Community College, and two public stations in Texas, but no agreement emerged. A former board member, who resigned in lieu of being removed from the board, accused station management of attempting to hide the depth of KCOS's financial issues.

The new general manager, Robert Muñoz, sought to steady the station's finances. In response to the fact that Hispanics were severely underrepresented as donors to KCOS, the station launched a membership drive focusing on the Hispanic community, known as Algo Más ("Something Else"). KCOS was also one of the first 11 stations to participate in the pilot for PBS's Ready-to-Learn initiative, devoting its daytime schedule to children's programs aimed at preschoolers, in 1994. During Muñoz's tenure, KCOS also produced and distributed the docudrama Held in Trust: The Story of Lt. Henry Ossian Flipper, a first in station history.

Muñoz left in 1998 and was replaced by Craig Brush. Early in his time running the station, KCOS dealt with being off air for non-cable viewers for three weeks in early 2000 when the antenna partially failed. Only one channel could be broadcast, and KVIA-TV had priority; it also needed the remaining transmission capacity in order to broadcast Super Bowl XXXIV.

In 2003, UTEP informed KCOS that it needed the space the station occupied in the university's Education Building and would not renew its lease for 11,000 square feet (1,000 m^{2}) in the Education Building. KCOS had few options and needed to find space in an existing building that could provide services such as security and cleaning. In July 2006, KCOS relocated to a building at the headquarters of El Paso Community College, sharing space with the college's communications system.

KCOS was financially battered by the Great Recession in the late 2000s. From a high of 6,000 members, KCOS counted 3,500 members by November 2008; membership provided 63 percent of the station's revenue, with the Corporation for Public Broadcasting (CPB) providing the remainder. The station's budget declined from $1.8 million in 2008 to $1.4 million in 2013. After Brush resigned in 2010, the station had two interim leaders.

=== Merger into Texas Tech Public Media ===
In 2015, the El Paso Public Television Foundation decided that KCOS needed to partner with another station. Non-federal government support for KCOS had fallen below levels stipulated by the CPB to continue to receive community service grants; it then received a waiver to continue receiving the grants. The foundation approached Texas Tech Public Media, the public media service of Texas Tech University, in late 2017 about the possibility of a merger.

On August 12, 2019, a purchase agreement was announced that would see KCOS sold to Texas Tech University for a token amount of $1,000. All nine of the station's full-time local personnel would remain in place under the new ownership, which would see it become a sister station to Lubbock's KTTZ-TV, KTTZ-FM, and KTXT-FM. Adding KCOS expanded Texas Tech Public Media's reach by more than one million households. The sale was completed on September 30, 2019. Shortly after, KCOS rebranded as PBS El Paso.

== Local programming ==
PBS El Paso produces three local programs on its own—the monthly health series El Paso Physician, culture series Only in El Paso, and Rooted and a fourth in collaboration with KTTZ-TV in Lubbock, music showcase Sound on Tap.

== Technical information ==
=== Subchannels ===
KCOS's transmitter is located atop the Franklin Mountains. The station's signal is multiplexed:

Subchannels of KCOS
Subchannel	Res.	Short name	Programming
13.1	1080i	KCOS-HD	PBS
13.2	480i	CREATE	Create
13.3	480i	KIDS	PBS Kids

Until July 1, 2023, the station carried channels produced by El Paso Community College and the city of El Paso. These were removed, while PBS Kids was added.

=== Analog-to digital conversion ===
KCOS shut down its analog signal, over VHF channel 13, at 11:30 p.m. on June 12, 2009, the official date on which full-power television stations in the United States transitioned from analog to digital broadcasts under federal mandate. The station's digital signal relocated from its pre-transition UHF channel 30 to VHF channel 13 for post-transition operations.
