= KLBK-TV =

Television station in Lubbock, Texas

- Lubbock, Texas; United States
- Channels: Digital: 31 (UHF); Virtual: 13
- Branding: KLBK

Programming
- Affiliations: 13.1: CBS; for others, see § Subchannels

Ownership
- Owner: Nexstar Media Group; (Nexstar Media Inc.)
- Sister stations: KAMC

History
- First air date: November 13, 1952
- Former call signs: KDUB-TV (1952–1961)
- Former channel numbers: Analog: 13 (VHF, 1952–2009); Digital: 40 (UHF, until 2019)
- Former affiliations: Both secondary: DuMont (1952–1955); ABC (1952–1969)
- Call sign meaning: Lubbock

Technical information
- Licensing authority: FCC
- Facility ID: 3660
- ERP: 400 kW
- HAAT: 265.8 m (872 ft)
- Transmitter coordinates: 33°31′33.8″N 101°52′8.6″W

Links
- Public license information: Public file; LMS
- Website: www.everythinglubbock.com

KLBK-TV (channel 13) is a television station in Lubbock, Texas, United States, affiliated with CBS. It is owned by Nexstar Media Group, which provides certain services to ABC affiliate KAMC (channel 28) under a local marketing agreement (LMA) with Mission Broadcasting. The two stations share studios on University Avenue in south Lubbock, where KLBK-TV's transmitter is also located.

== History ==
The station began its broadcasting operation as KDUB-TV, founded by the late television pioneer W. D. "Dub" Rogers, Jr, putting the station on the air for the first time on November 13, 1952. It was the first commercially licensed television station in a medium to small-sized market. Over the next few years, Rogers signed on KPAR-TV in Abilene (now KTXS-TV), KEDY-TV in Big Spring (now KCWO-TV) and KVER-TV in Clovis, New Mexico (now KVIH-TV, a satellite of KVII-TV in Amarillo). These stations made up the West Texas Television Network, the first regional television network in the United States.

Originally the station also carried ABC as a secondary affiliation until 1969 when KSEL-TV (now KAMC) became the local primary ABC affiliate. The station also carried an affiliation with DuMont during the early 1950s.

Grayson Enterprises (named for Sidney Grayson but after 1964 not owned) assumed ownership of KDUB-TV and KPAR-TV in 1961 and changed KDUB's call letters to the current KLBK-TV. Over the years, Grayson acquired several other stations, including KVKM-TV in Monahans (later KMOM and now KWES-TV). However, Grayson Enterprises ran into license renewal trouble in 1968, 1971, 1974, and 1977 for some of its stations. These stations were accused of fraudulent billing, program and transmitter log fabrication, main studio violations, failure to make required technical tests, and other issues. The stations had their renewals deferred and hearings ordered as a result.

The case was settled in what was then described as a "distress sale", in which Grayson's stations were broken up and sold to minority-controlled groups (nowadays known as historically-underutilized groups) at a reduced price. The parameters of such a sale were defined by this sell-off. As a result, KMOM and KWAB were transferred to a Hispanic-controlled group, while KLBK and KTXS went to Prima, Inc. (whose principals were African American). The other stations in the West Texas Network were sold to other owners. Woods then sold KLBK plus three of its stations—KARD in West Monroe, Louisiana, KDEB-TV (now KOZL-TV) in Springfield, Missouri, and WTVW in Evansville, Indiana—to Banam Broadcasting, a subsidiary of BankAmerica in 1993. In 1995, Banam sold KLBK, along with KARD, WTVW, and KDEB-TV, to Petracom Broadcasting. Petracom in turn sold it to Quorum Broadcasting in 1998.

KLBK was acquired in late 2003 as part of Nexstar Broadcasting Group's purchase of Quorum Broadcasting. The station updated its logo and news set on February 1, 2007, dropping the channel number from its branding (since KLBK is carried on different channels on different television platforms).

KLBK is one of the few stations in the country to sign off (along with KAMC), doing so early Saturday mornings at 2:35 a.m. and on Sunday mornings at 1:05 a.m., returning to the air at 5:30 a.m. These stations airs a weather loop during overnight periods.

== News operation ==
KLBK's news coverage centers around the city of Lubbock and across the South Plains region of West Texas. The station produces over 19 hours of news content each week. Newscasts air at 6 a.m., noon, 6 p.m. and 10 p.m. on weekdays. Saturday night newscasts air at 6 and 10 p.m. Only one newscast airs on Sunday nights at 10 p.m. The station recently dropped the 5 p.m. weekday afternoon newscast in 2012 and expanded the 6 p.m. newscast to a full hour. On June 17, 2013, the station became the third news operation in Lubbock to begin broadcasting all newscasts in high definition. On that day the station debuted its newly constructed sets, updated branding and image and a new state of the art weather graphics system from WSI. In August 2013, KLBK debuted a new half hour lifestyle show called Trends & Friends, weeknights at 5 p.m.

=== Notable former on-air staff ===
From 1988 through 1990, Michael Sommermeyer served as evening news anchor at KLBK. After leaving KLBK, he moved across town to KCBD and served as that station's consumer reporter before leaving KCBD in 1992. However, Sommermeyer's claim to fame arguably came almost two decades after his stint at KLBK, as he served as the courts information officer for Clark County, Nevada, during the robbery trial of former NFL star O. J. Simpson.

== Technical information ==
=== Subchannels ===
The station's signal is multiplexed:

Subchannels of KLBK-TV
Channel	Res.	Short name	Programming
13.1	1080i	KLBK-HD	CBS
13.2	480i	COURT	Court TV → Defy (soon)
13.3	480i	ANTENNA	Antenna TV
13.4	480i	REWIND	Rewind TV

=== Analog-to-digital conversion ===
KLBK-TV shut down its analog signal, over VHF channel 13, on February 17, 2009, the original target date on which full-power television stations in the United States were to transition from analog to digital broadcasts under federal mandate (which was later pushed back to June 12, 2009). The station's digital signal remained on its pre-transition UHF channel 40, using virtual channel 13.
