= Hollywood Girls Night =

American reality television series

- Genre: Reality
- Starring: Ali Landry; Alison Sweeney
- Country of origin: United States
- Original language: English
- No. of seasons: 1
- No. of episodes: 6

Production
- Executive producers: Ali Landry; Alison Sweeney; Kristin Graham; Scott Einziger
- Running time: 20 to 22 minutes

Original release
- Network: TV Guide Network
- Release: November 27, 2011 – April 1, 2012

Hollywood Girls Night is an American reality television series that aired on the TV Guide Network from November 27, 2011 to April 1, 2012. The series focuses on Ali Landry and Alison Sweeney as they host a girls night. The series is executive produced by Landry and Sweeney.

== Premise ==
The series follows Landry and Sweeney (known as the two "Ali's") and their attempt to throw their own girls night with their celebrity guests. Guests include Carnie Wilson, Tamera Mowry, Kristian Alfonso, Debbie Gibson, Patti Stanger, Daisy Fuentes, Garcelle Beauvais, Brooke Burns, Cheryl Burke, Kendra Wilkinson, Robin Givens, Tracey Gold, Kyle Richards, Sheryl Underwood, Denise Richards, La La Anthony and Niecy Nash

== Episodes ==
No.	Title	Original release date
1	"Hollywood Girls Night"	November 27, 2011
2	"Swapping Secrets"	March 4, 2012
3	"Passion Party"	March 11, 2012
4	"Spring into Sexy"	March 18, 2012
5	"Unforgettable"	March 25, 2012
6	"Dare to Bare It"	April 1, 2012
