= KOSA-TV =

Television station in Odessa, Texas

- Odessa–Midland, Texas; United States
- City: Odessa, Texas
- Channels: Digital: 7 (VHF); Virtual: 7
- Branding: First Alert 7; West Texas CW (7.2); Telemundo 20 (7.3)

Programming
- Affiliations: 7.1: CBS; 7.2: CW+; 7.3: Telemundo; 7.4: Heroes & Icons

Ownership
- Owner: Gray Media; (Gray Television Licensee, LLC)
- Sister stations: KCWO-TV, KWWT, KMDF-LD, KTLE-LD

History
- First air date: January 1, 1956
- Former channel numbers: Analog: 7 (VHF, 1956–2009); Digital: 31 (UHF, until 2009)
- Call sign meaning: Odessa

Technical information
- Licensing authority: FCC
- Facility ID: 6865
- ERP: 48 kW
- HAAT: 226 m (741 ft)
- Transmitter coordinates: 31°51′50.8″N 102°34′42.5″W
- Translator(s): K31KJ-D Big Spring

Links
- Public license information: Public file; LMS
- Website: www.firstalert7.com

KOSA-TV (channel 7) is a television station licensed to Odessa, Texas, United States, serving as the CBS affiliate for the Permian Basin area. It is owned by Gray Media alongside KWWT (channel 30), KCWO-TV (channel 4), KTLE-LD (channel 20), and KMDF-LD (channel 22). These stations share studios inside the Music City Mall on East 42nd Street in Odessa, with a secondary studio and news bureau in downtown Midland; KOSA-TV's transmitter is located on FM 866 west of Odessa.

KOSA-TV began broadcasting on January 1, 1956, after three years of wrangling over who would get the permit to build a television station in Odessa. The station was founded by a group led by KOSA radio owner Cecil Trigg and soon joined by businessman Jack Vaughn, who came to own radio and television stations in West Texas and throughout the Southwest and Mountain West. The Trigg-Vaughn group, including KOSA-TV but not KOSA radio, was sold to book publisher Doubleday in 1967 to form Doubleday Broadcasting; Doubleday in turn sold the station to Forward Communications in 1973.

KOSA was the leading station for news in the area until the aftermath of a 1983 plane crash that killed eight people, including six KOSA employees. On board were the assistant news director, who anchored the 6 p.m. newscast, as well as the sports director, both returning from high school football coverage. The loss of personnel and turnover coincided with the remaking of KMID (channel 2) under new ownership. The rises of KMID in the 1980s and KWES-TV (channel 9) in the 1990s caused the station to sink to third place as ownership changed four times in twelve years.

ICA Broadcasting, a local business conglomerate, acquired KOSA-TV in 2000. It moved the station from its original studio building into the Music City Mall, which it owned, and overhauled the news operation, which rebounded from its 1990s lows. KOSA featured in the 2007 reality TV series Making News: Texas Style. Gray acquired the station from ICA in 2015 and absorbed additional assets, including KCWO-TV and the Telemundo and CW affiliations, as part of Gray's merger with Raycom Media in 2019.

== History ==
=== Construction and early years ===
After the Federal Communications Commission (FCC) allocated channel 7 to Odessa, Texas, several different groups over a two-year period sought federal approval to build a station on the channel:

- Odessa Television Company, backed by Cecil Mills, an oil property owner and manager of the Lincoln Hotel
- Odessa Broadcasting Company, owned by Cecil Trigg, owner of Odessa radio station KOSA
- The Ector County Broadcasting Company, owner of local radio station KECK and solely owned by Ben Nedow, a furniture and real estate businessman

The Mills and Trigg applications were combined, and in June 1953 Trigg announced he would withdraw his application if Nedow could build the proposed station, in order to speed up the arrival of television in Odessa. However, the city's television dealers, nonplussed by the Nedow proposal, felt that they did not have confidence enough to ask Trigg to withdraw, so he stayed in. A third application, made by Clarence E. Wilson and Philip D. Jackson doing business as The Odessa Television Company with broadcasting interests in Oklahoma and Wyoming, was filed in August 1953; Nedow withdrew in June 1954, citing poor health.

The Trigg–Mills and Wilson–Jackson applications proceeded to comparative hearing, with FCC hearing examiner John B. Poindexter ruling in favor of Trigg–Mills in an initial decision rendered in November 1954. He found that bid superior in "local ownership, past partnership in civic affairs of the Odessa community, program proposals, and diversification of control of the media of mass communications". Wilson and Jackson appealed the decision to the full FCC, which in July 1955 upheld the award to Trigg–Mills. That September, construction began on KOSA-TV. Studios were erected at 13th Street and Whitaker; network affiliation was obtained with CBS; the station paid for four temporary towers to connect KOSA to live network television, joining existing network lines at Lamesa; and a transmitter was built at a site 13 miles (21 km) west of town.

KOSA-TV began broadcasting January 1, 1956, using a temporary antenna for nearly two weeks. At the end of the year, a 50-percent interest in the station was sold to Jack C. and Grady H. Vaughn. The Vaughns, brothers, owned oil and real estate properties throughout the state; their company had built KOSA-TV's studio building. The Trigg–Vaughn group grew in Texas with the acquisition of KVII-TV in Amarillo (owned 1958–1963) and KROD-AM-TV in El Paso (1959). By the time Trigg–Vaughn sold nearly all of its stations to book publishing firm Doubleday in 1967, forming Doubleday Broadcasting, it also owned radio properties in San Antonio, Denver, Albuquerque, and San Bernardino, as well as a construction permit for channel 39 in Dallas. The sale did not include KOSA radio. In 1973, Doubleday sold KOSA-TV to the Wisconsin-based Forward Communications.

=== 1983 plane crash ===
On November 26, 1983, an airplane chartered by KOSA was returning from Fort Worth, carrying personnel who had been covering playoff high school football games there and in Wichita Falls. It crashed when it attempted to land at Midland Regional Airport. The crash killed assistant news director Gary Hopper, sports director Jeff Shull, chief engineer Bob Stephens, and three other KOSA employees, representing more than 51 years of experience, as well as the pilot and Gary Hopper's brother-in-law. A witness saw the aircraft stall, turn on its left wing and crash. It was, to that time, the deadliest air crash in Midland history. The remaining staff were left to cover the news story while mourning their fallen colleagues; among them was station manager Tom Hughes, who had changed his plans not to travel at the last minute.

The National Transportation Safety Board was unable to determine a cause for the crash and released its final report in 1985. Opinions differed on whether the pilot was feeling the onset of a heart attack, noting that the yoke had been pulled up—unusual for the pilot, who was considered reliable. The possibility that a passenger grabbed the controls was investigated. The plane's owner and operator were sued by the families of three of the victims and settled out of court.

=== From first to second to third ===
Prior to the plane crash, KOSA-TV had been the leading news station in the Midland–Odessa market. However, in addition to the crash killing on-air employees (Hopper was the 6 p.m. news anchor), staff turnover increased following the event. One competitor, KMID (channel 2), capitalized on this uncertainty. KMID, previously the distant second-rated station, hired popular KOSA weatherman J. Gordon Lunn and invested in capital improvements under new ownership. Within a year, from November 1984 to November 1985, KMID increased its 6 p.m. news audience by 15 percentage points and moved past KOSA.

Forward Communications was sold in late 1984 to Wesray Capital Corporation, which retained the Forward name for its media holdings. Under Wesray, KOSA news shifted to a dual-anchor format, and the station got a new news set as it sought to compete with the ascendant KMID. The company sold its remaining five TV stations to Adams Communications in 1987, in a transaction that left the buyer highly leveraged. As a result of the leverage and declines in the value of broadcast properties, the company defaulted on $283 million of debt in 1991; Brissette Broadcasting was formed the next year when Paul Brissette, who had been the vice president of Adams Communications's television stations division, bought out the business for $257 million. Four years later, in a $270 million merger, Brissette was folded into Benedek Broadcasting after the company was unable to expand by adding stations. During this time, KOSA-TV fell further in the ratings, from second to third, after KTPX-TV (channel 9) became KWES-TV and rose to supplant KMID as the market's highest-rated station for news. The station's first attempt at a morning newscast, KOSA This Morning, lasted a year and a half due to CBS's poor ratings performance with its national CBS This Morning.

=== ICA Broadcasting ownership ===
On December 27, 1999, Odessa businessman John Bushman announced he had agreed to acquire KOSA-TV from Benedek. Bushman already had media interests in the form of ICA Broadcasting, which owned KMCM (96.9 FM), and owned Odessa's Music City Mall, to which he announced KOSA-TV would relocate, and several car dealerships and other businesses. The $8 million sale closed in March 2000; a new morning newscast debuted the following month, and work began that May to renovate three storefronts in the mall for the new KOSA facility. The new site featured large windows looking out to the mall. By the end of 2000, KOSA had increased its 10 p.m. news audience by 50 percent, but it was still behind KWES; in 2003, the station posted its first number-one ranking in prime time in more than a decade.

While KOSA-TV regained the ratings advantage in Ector County and Odessa, it still was losing in the total market because Midland viewers had the impression that KOSA was an Odessa-oriented station. From 2003 to 2007, the station operated a Midland bureau in the Heritage Center downtown, and in 2007, it hired KWES-TV anchor Jay Hendricks with hopes of increasing its viewership in Midland.

In 2007, KOSA was the setting for Making News: Texas Style, a reality television series aired by TV Guide Network. The program had originally been set to be filmed at KWES-TV before Hendricks changed stations; producers selected the Midland–Odessa market because of its competitiveness.

=== Gray ownership ===
On May 20, 2015, Gray Television announced that it would acquire KOSA-TV from ICA for $33.6 million; the sale was completed on July 1. Gray reopened a Midland bureau in 2017, in the ground floor of Midland Tower.

Gray merged with Raycom Media in a deal announced in June 2018 and completed on January 2, 2019. Raycom owned KWES-TV, but under FCC rules of the time, the merged company could not retain both stations, and KWES-TV and WTOL in Toledo, Ohio, were divested to Tegna Inc. for $105 million. In the acquisition, Gray retained several assets previously held by Raycom in the Midland–Odessa market: KWAB-TV in Big Spring (which became The CW affiliate KCWO-TV) and the Telemundo affiliation, both of which began broadcasting from KOSA-TV with the sale's closing. Gray acquired KWWT (channel 30), the MeTV affiliate, in 2020 under a failing station waiver; it was able to do so because KCWO-TV holds a satellite station waiver. KOSA rebranded as First Alert 7 in 2024.

== Technical information ==
=== Subchannels ===
KOSA-TV's transmitter is located on FM 866 west of Odessa. The station's signal is multiplexed:

Subchannels of KOSA-TV
Subchannel	Res.	Short name	Programming
7.1	1080i	CBS	CBS
7.2	720p	CW	CW+ (KCWO-TV)
7.3	480i	TLMD	Telemundo (KTLE-LD)
7.4	480i	H&I	Heroes & Icons
7.5	480i	OUTLAW	Outlaw

Simulcast of subchannels of another station

=== Analog-to-digital conversion ===
KOSA-TV shut down its analog signal, over VHF channel 7, on June 12, 2009, the official digital television transition date. The station's digital signal relocated from its pre-transition UHF channel 31 to VHF channel 7 for post-transition operations.

== See also ==
- Channel 7 digital TV stations in the United States
- Channel 7 virtual TV stations in the United States
- Channel 16 branded TV stations in the United States
