= KVLF-TV =

Television station in Alpine, Texas (1961–1963)

- Alpine, Texas; United States
- Channels: Analog: 12 (VHF)

Programming
- Affiliations: ABC

Ownership
- Owner: Big Bend Broadcasters, Inc.

History
- First air date: December 30, 1961
- Last air date: December 1963

Technical information
- ERP: 0.17 kW
- HAAT: −73 m (−240 ft)
- Transmitter coordinates: 30°22′26.4″N 103°39′42.3″W

KVLF-TV (channel 12) was a television station in Alpine, Texas, United States, which broadcast from December 1961 to around December 1963 as an affiliate of ABC. It was the first available television service in Alpine, operating as a semi-satellite of KVKM-TV in Monahans. It shared studios with its sister radio station, KVLF (1240 AM).

== History ==
On January 19, 1961, Big Bend Broadcasters, owners of KVLF, obtained a construction permit to build a new television station on channel 12 in Alpine. The station signed on December 30, 1961, with the 1961 Sun Bowl as its inaugural program. Channel 12 was a limited facility; its effective radiated power was a mere 170 watts.

In its early months, KVLF broadcast a half-hour local news and weather report at 7 p.m., divided into five segments, leading into the ABC network lineup and signing off at 11 p.m. By December 1963, however, KVLF-TV's program schedule had been reduced. The station signed on weekdays at 6 p.m. with a test pattern and proceeded to air 15 minutes of news at 6:15, followed by the ABC network lineup, signing off at 10 p.m.; it did not air any local programming on weekends.

Annuals such as the Television Factbook listed KVLF-TV as a satellite of KVKM-TV; however, KVLF-TV's broadcast day was shorter than that of KVKM-TV, which at the time did not produce any local news programming but did telecast daytime shows.

KVLF-TV suspended operations at some point near the end of 1963. A 2015 article on KVLF radio stated that channel 12 lasted "about two years". Reasons for KVLF's closure are not stated, though owner Gene Hendryx had been elected in 1962 as a state representative, taking time from his broadcasting ventures, and KVKM-TV was already available on the Alpine TV Cable service in town.
