= KWES-TV =

Television station in Odessa, Texas

- Odessa–Midland, Texas; United States
- City: Odessa, Texas (Note: Originally licensed to Monahans, Texas; moved to Odessa in 1980.)
- Channels: Digital: 9 (VHF); Virtual: 9
- Branding: NewsWest 9

Programming
- Affiliations: 9.1: NBC; for others, see § Subchannels

Ownership
- Owner: Tegna Inc., a subsidiary of Nexstar Media Group; (KWES Television, LLC)
- Sister stations: Nexstar: KMID, KPEJ-TV

History
- First air date: December 1, 1958
- Former call signs: KVKM-TV (1958–1969); KMOM-TV (1969–1980); KTPX (1980–1993)
- Former channel numbers: Analog: 9 (VHF, 1958–2009); Digital: 13 (VHF, 2005–2009)
- Former affiliations: ABC (1958–1982)
- Call sign meaning: West Texas

Technical information
- Licensing authority: FCC
- Facility ID: 42007
- ERP: 94.4 kW
- HAAT: 391.3 m (1,284 ft)
- Transmitter coordinates: 31°59′17″N 102°52′43″W

Links
- Public license information: Public file; LMS
- Website: newswest9.com

KWES-TV (channel 9) is a television station licensed to Odessa, Texas, United States, serving as the NBC affiliate for the Permian Basin area. It is owned by the Tegna subsidiary of Nexstar Media Group; Nexstar also owns ABC affiliate KMID (channel 2) and operates Fox affiliate KPEJ-TV (channel 24). KWES-TV's studios are located on West County Road 127 near the Midland International Air and Space Port, between Odessa and Midland, and its transmitter is located near Notrees, Texas.

Channel 9 in the Midland–Odessa market signed on as KVKM-TV from Monahans in 1958. A small ABC affiliate, the station was a relatively minor player in the Permian Basin market. The station was owned by Grayson Enterprises in the 1970s under the KMOM-TV call sign; allegations of falsified program logs and other violations, as well as the gutting of Grayson-owned KWAB (channel 4, now KCWO-TV) in Big Spring to rebroadcast KMOM-TV, led to license renewal hearings that culminated in a distress sale to a minority-owned company, Permian Basin Television Corporation.

The new owners relaunched the station as KTPX in 1980, but advertiser misgivings continued to weigh the station down. ABC upgraded its affiliation by switching to KMID-TV in 1982, leaving KTPX with the NBC affiliation in the area. Drewry Communications purchased KTPX in 1991, ending a four-year period of receivership. The call sign was changed to KWES-TV in 1993 as part of a major overhaul that made the station competitive in the market. Drewry sold its portfolio of stations in Texas and Oklahoma to Raycom Media in 2015. When Raycom merged with Gray Television in January 2019, Tegna acquired KWES-TV; in the process, Gray separated KWAB and The CW and Telemundo affiliations for the market and combined them with Gray-owned CBS affiliate KOSA-TV (channel 7). Nexstar acquired Tegna in 2026.

== History ==
=== KVKM-TV ===
Two groups competed for channel 9, which in west Texas was initially allocated to the community of Monahans, Texas, southwest of Odessa. In 1957, the Federal Communications Commission (FCC) received two applications, which were placed in comparative hearing. The next year, the KMPS Broadcasting Company, associated with KMID-TV in Midland, withdrew its application, clearing the way for Tri-Cities Broadcasting Company to receive the construction permit. Tri-Cities Broadcasting consisted of John B. Walton and his wife Helen, as well as Ross Rucker, the general manager of Monahans radio station KVKM (1340 AM; now KCKM 1330). While it was initially proposed to build the tower at Pyote, a site six miles (9.7 km) north of Monahans was ultimately selected to house the transmitter facility for KVKM-TV. By the time a contract had been awarded to construct the station in September, KVKM-TV had signed for an affiliation with ABC.

KVKM-TV began broadcasting on December 1, 1958. In addition to broadcasting to such cities as Midland, Fort Stockton, and Eunice, New Mexico, cable systems carried the new station's signal as far as Hobbs, New Mexico, and Alpine, Texas. Among the station's first local programs was a Friday night dance party show. From 1961 to 1963, KVLF-TV (channel 12) in Alpine operated as an ABC affiliate; reckoned by national advertising publications as a satellite station of KVKM-TV, it did not air all of the Monahans station's programming.

In 1962, KVKM-TV applied for and was granted permission to move its transmitter to a new site 17 miles (27 km) northeast of Kermit, Texas, atop the Caprock, which would be the highest transmitter site in the state east of El Paso. This site, activated the next year, improved the station's signal in the comparatively populous Odessa–Midland area.

Walton acquired KAVE-TV, a television station in Carlsbad, New Mexico, in 1966. At the same time, Rucker, who was no longer a part-owner of KVKM-TV but continued to manage KVKM radio, purchased the associated KAVE radio station in Carlsbad. By November, local programming had disappeared from KAVE-TV, which began to rebroadcast KVKM-TV.

=== KMOM-TV ===
John B. Walton Jr. took over the family's broadcasting properties before his father's death in 1967. KVKM radio was sold to Rucker, while a television station construction permit in Lubbock was also sold off.

In 1968, Walton announced the sale of KVKM-TV to Grayson Enterprises, which already owned KWAB, a CBS affiliate in Big Spring, east of Odessa and Midland. The call letters were changed to KMOM-TV (Monahans–Odessa–Midland) on March 15, 1969, and Grayson began an 11-year ownership tenure beset with problems. (Walton retained KAVE-TV, which switched to rebroadcasting another Walton-owned ABC affiliate, KELP-TV in El Paso.) In December 1969, citing economic issues, Grayson converted KWAB to rebroadcasting KMOM-TV; while this brought color advertising and an improved network signal to the Big Spring area, the move was unpopular with Big Spring business interests and violated commitments Grayson had made to the FCC at the time of the purchase. Grayson also sought to leave Monahans. In 1970, remodeling plans were made for an Odessa building that would house KMOM-TV's operations. However, when the station filed to move its main studio in 1972, KOSA-TV objected, and the station had the proposal dismissed after nearly a year.

More serious problems were on the horizon. In 1974, KMOM-TV filed for the renewal of its broadcast license. Midland Telecasting Company, which operated the short-lived KDCD-TV (channel 18) in Midland, filed a petition to deny the renewal with the FCC. Midland Telecasting had sued Grayson, the owners of KMID-TV and KOSA-TV, cable systems in Midland and Odessa, and other parties for what it alleged was a conspiracy to shut the company out of the broadcasting industry. It also charged that Grayson had falsified program logs and engaged in "clipping", a practice whereby local commercials covered up national advertisements or were added on top of national network programs. In June 1977, the FCC designated the license renewals of all four Grayson television properties—KMOM-TV and KWAB, KTXS-TV in Sweetwater, and KLBK-TV in Lubbock—for hearing, with the primary issues being KMOM-TV's program logs and a possible unapproved move of the KTXS-TV studios from Sweetwater to Abilene.

A then-new FCC policy known as the "distress sale" came into play. In a distress sale, stations facing license renewal challenges could be sold to minority-controlled groups at a reduced price. In October 1978, the administrative law judge in the Grayson hearings stayed proceedings and allowed the company to begin seeking a qualified buyer. Grayson announced the sale of KMOM-TV and KWAB, along with the Sweetwater and Lubbock stations, to Silver Star Communications, a Black-owned company, in April 1979. However, Silver Star—which changed its name to Prima, Inc., to resolve a conflict with another company—decided instead to look for another minority buyer for the Monahans and Big Spring stations.

The distress sale was complicated by another minority group that was trying to buy KMOM-TV, KWAB, and KTXS-TV. Austin-based Manchaca Enterprises, headed by former U.S. representative Barbara Jordan, intervened in the case in part because guidance around the new distress sale policy had not been fully formulated. It believed that Prima, in presenting a $15 million bid for the stations, had offered too much money, something not permitted for a distress sale; Manchaca had consulted with Joe Allbritton, a television station owner in Washington, D.C., who had suggested that they lower their original bid, and one of its members, Stanley McClellan, specifically cited the need for significant equipment investments in Monahans and Big Spring. Midland Telecasting also objected to the high sale price. The sale application was still pending at the FCC by February 1980, when Grayson pleaded to the commission to approve its bids to sell KTXS-TV and KLBK-TV to Prima and KMOM-TV and KWAB to Permian Basin Television Corporation, a consortium of Mexican American businessmen from Albuquerque, New Mexico. New urgency was given to the sale of the television stations when Mercantile National Bank of Dallas, a major creditor of Grayson Enterprises, informed the FCC that it would foreclose on the stations by April 1 if they were not sold.

=== KTPX ===
The FCC approved the Permian Basin Television Corporation purchase of KMOM-TV and KWAB on March 28, 1980; when combined with another distress sale approved that same day, the number of Hispanic-owned TV stations in the United States went from one to four. After the sale took effect on July 1, the new ownership set out to improve stations in dire need of aid. The call letters on KMOM-TV changed on October 20, 1980, to KTPX, representing "Television for the Petroplex". Further, Permian Basin Television successfully applied to move KTPX from Monahans to Odessa, relocating to studios near the airport. These improvements, however, were not enough to lift the station out of third place in market television ratings. In 1982, ABC moved its affiliation to KMID-TV, with KTPX assuming the NBC affiliation. During this time, Brian Wilson, later of Fox News, was a reporter for the station.

Permian Basin Television sold the station to MSP Television in a transaction that took effect in January 1986. MSP was named for its owners, all officers in San Francisco-based Chronicle Broadcasting: Francis A. Martin III, James H. Smith, and Glen E. Pickell. However, the company was unable to satisfy its lenders. In November 1987, KTPX was placed into receivership by Toronto-Dominion Bank, with sliding advertising revenues due to a poor economy and a lingering poor reputation from the KMOM-TV years cited as causes.

=== KWES-TV ===
In 1991, four years of receivership finally ended when Drewry Communications made a winning $4.8 million bid for KTPX. For Drewry, it was a return to the Permian Basin market, as company patriarch Ransom H. Drewry had been co-founder and majority owner of KMID-TV from 1953 until 1985.

Drewry drew on its connections at KMID as it started to rebuild the station. It lured general manager John Foster, a KMID employee of 32 years, to KTPX by offering him an equity position. Over the next two years, the new ownership invested $1.35 million in capital improvements, including a satellite newsgathering truck and a new news set, and the title of the station's newscasts was changed to NewsWest 9 in July 1992. The call sign was changed to KWES-TV on August 16, 1993; by Ransom Drewry's death in January 1994, station personnel credited his ownership with revitalizing channel 9.

Drewry's expansion in the Permian Basin market grew to include Hispanic media. Telemundo had been broadcast to the Odessa area by translator K60EE since February 1991. Drewry assumed operations of the Telemundo station (now KTLE-LD) in 2000, and in March 2001, it debuted the first full-length Spanish-language local newscast in the market. The next year, the company acquired KTXC (104.7 FM), a station in Lamesa airing a Regional Mexican format, to add to its Hispanic media portfolio.

Drewry had planned to sell its stations to London Broadcasting in 2008; however, by January 2009, the deal fell through. It was another six years before the company sold its broadcasting portfolio to Raycom Media for $160 million in 2015. The sale was completed on December 1.

Raycom announced a $3.6 billion merger into Atlanta-based Gray Television, owner of KOSA-TV, on June 25, 2018. Gray opted to retain KOSA-TV as well as KWAB, KTLE, and The CW affiliation (which had aired on a subchannel of KWES since 2014) and sold KWES-TV, along with WTOL in Toledo, Ohio, to Tegna Inc. for $105 million. KWAB was subsequently converted to KCWO-TV, carrying CW+ programming with a simulcast on KOSA-TV's second digital subchannel. The sale was completed on January 2, 2019.

Nexstar Media Group, owner of KMID and operator of KPEJ-TV in the Midland–Odessa market, acquired Tegna in a deal announced in August 2025 and completed on March 19, 2026. A temporary restraining order issued one week later by the U.S. District Court for the Eastern District of California, later escalated to a preliminary injunction, has prevented KWES from being integrated into KMID and KPEJ.

== Technical information ==
=== Subchannels ===
The KWES-TV transmitter is located near Notrees, Texas. The station's signal is multiplexed:

Subchannels of KWES-TV
Subchannel	Res.	Short name	Programming
9.1	1080i	KWES-HD	NBC
9.2	720p	Quest	Quest
9.3	480i	Crime	True Crime Network
9.4	480i	Bounce	Bounce TV
9.6	480i	ShopLC	Shop LC
9.7	480i	GetTV	Great

=== Analog-to-digital conversion ===
KWES-TV shut down its analog signal, over VHF channel 9, on June 12, 2009, the official date on which full-power television stations in the United States transitioned from analog to digital broadcasts under federal mandate. The station's digital signal relocated from its pre-transition VHF channel 13 to channel 9 for post-transition operations.
