= Music City Mall =

Shopping mall in Odessa, Texas, US

- Location: Odessa, Texas, United States
- Coordinates: 31°53′42.1″N 102°20′20.1″W
- Address: 4101 East 42nd Street
- Opened: 1980
- Developer: C&A Development
- Owner: ICA Properties
- Num. of stores: approx. 100
- Num. of anchor tenants: 5
- Floor area: 820,000 square feet (76,000 m^{2})
- Floors: 1
- Website: musiccitymall.net

Music City Mall, formerly Permian Mall, is a regional shopping mall located in Odessa, Texas, United States. The mall features At Home, Burlington, Dillard's, and JCPenney as its anchor stores. It opened in February 1980 with Dillard's, JCPenney, and Sears, with a further expansion adding Mervyn's. Other major tenants of the mall include Urban Air Adventure Park and MCM Rink n Roll. The mall is owned and managed by ICA Properties.

== History ==
C&A Development, a retail firm based in Scottsdale, Arizona, first announced plans for Permian Mall in late 1977. The firm had conducted research in the West Texas market after building South Plains Mall in Lubbock, Texas, in 1972, and determined that the Odessa-Midland area was suitable for construction of another shopping mall. The site chosen, on 42nd Street on the east side of Odessa, was within a portion of Ector County which was slated to undergo annexation by the city of Odessa, a process which had to be completed before C&A Development could begin construction. In May 1978, the city's zoning board approved construction of the property. By September 1978, C&A Development had confirmed three of the mall's anchor stores: Dillard's, JCPenney, and Sears, the latter two of whom would be relocating from existing stores in Odessa. Groundbreaking began that same month, with estimated building costs of $17,000,000.

Luby's, a chain of cafeteria restaurants, confirmed in May 1979 that they would open a restaurant at Permian Mall. The company chose to locate in Odessa due to the success of existing restaurants in Midland and Abilene. Mall construction was described in September 1979 as "on schedule" following the installation of air conditioning units on the mall's roof. Building permits filed with the city of Odessa in October 1979 confirmed a number of inline tenants, among which were Gordon's Jewelers, Brooks Fashions, and a movie theater owned by United Artists (now part of Regal Cinemas). A month later, Radio Shack, Jo-Ann Fabrics, and GNC were also confirmed to have signed permits for opening at Permian Mall.

Luby's was the first tenant to open, doing so on January 30, 1980. At the time, Sears was slated to open on February 6 and the theater on February 8. Another tenant slated to open ahead of the mall was its other dining establishment, a bar called Oliver's. Dillard's, JCPenney, and the rest of the mall all intended to open on February 27. Sears and JCPenney measured 146,000 square feet (13,600 m^{2}) and 106,000 square feet (9,800 m^{2}), respectively, making both stores over triple the size of the chains' previous locations in Odessa. In addition, both JCPenney and Sears featured automotive repair centers. The 100,000-square-foot (9,300 m^{2}) Dillard's department store featured clothing ranges for men, women, infants, children, and teenagers, as well as departments for record albums, books, stationery, and imported gifts. C&A Development also stated a large number of the mall's tenants. Among these were a food court with space for nine restaurants, as well as a Whataburger restaurant. Other tenants confirmed at this point included Waldenbooks, Casual Corner, Thom McAn, Kinney Shoes, Hallmark Cards, Lerner (now known as New York & Company), and Chess King. Overall, the mall building measured about 820,000 square feet (76,000 m^{2}), with space for about 140 stores; the entire complex consisted of one floor except for Sears, which had two. Prior to opening, C&A representatives stated they had space for up to 20 more tenants in the mall, and were also undergoing negotiations to add a fourth anchor store. The mall's main walkway was 35 feet (11 m) wide, featuring five fountains, eighteen planters, and multiple skylights. Grand-opening ceremonies included a private buffet dinner for tenants. As part of this dinner, chefs from Oliver's made a miniature model of the mall out of cheese, caviar, and asparagus. Representatives of C&A Development and Dillard's were present at a ribbon-cutting ceremony held to honor the opening of both Dillard's and the mall on February 27, 1980.

=== 1980s: After opening ===
At the time of Permian Mall's first anniversary in February 1981, the center was estimated to have generated over 2,000 jobs and $350,000 in sales tax revenues in the city of Odessa. The complex also held a variety of events during its first year, including boat and car shows, antiques vendors, and fashion shows. Mervyn's was added onto the mall in October 1985, becoming its fourth anchor store. Bealls moved to the mall in 1992 from an existing store at Winwood Mall. In 1996, the mall was sold to a limited liability corporation founded by local business owner John Bushman, known as Music City Mall LLC. Bushman announced that the complex would be renamed Music City Mall, and would undergo renovations to the interior and exterior with an estimated cost of $1,000,000. At the time of Bushman's purchase, the mall had a vacancy rate of about twelve percent. As part of a renovation project in 1997, an ice rink was added off the mall's food court. KOSA-TV, the CBS affiliate for the Odessa area, moved its studios to Music City Mall in 2000.

=== 21st century ===
Mervyn's closed at the mall in late 2008, along with another store in nearby Midland. In February 2010, their former location at Music City Mall became Burlington Coat Factory (now known as just Burlington). Sears closed in early 2017 and became At Home later that year. Regal Cinemas confirmed the closure of the Music City Mall theater in 2023 due to the chain filing for Chapter 11 bankruptcy. A year later, the former movie theater was converted to Urban Air Adventure Park, a chain of trampoline parks.
