= KSWO-TV =

Television station in Lawton, Oklahoma

- Lawton, Oklahoma; Wichita Falls, Texas; United States
- City: Lawton, Oklahoma
- Channels: Digital: 11 (VHF); Virtual: 7
- Branding: KSWO 7 News; Telemundo Texoma (7.2); MeTV Texoma (7.3)

Programming
- Affiliations: 7.1: ABC; 7.2: Telemundo; for others, see § Subchannels

Ownership
- Owner: Gray Media; (Gray Television Licensee, LLC)
- Sister stations: KAUZ-TV

History
- First air date: March 8, 1953
- Former channel numbers: Analog: 7 (VHF, 1953–2009); Digital: 23 (UHF, 2001–2003)
- Former affiliations: DuMont (secondary, 1953–1956)
- Call sign meaning: Southwest Oklahoma

Technical information
- Licensing authority: FCC
- Facility ID: 35645
- ERP: 138 kW
- HAAT: 325.1 m (1,067 ft)
- Transmitter coordinates: 34°12′56.4″N 98°43′18.3″W
- Translator(s): see § Translators

Links
- Public license information: Public file; LMS
- Website: www.kswo.com

KSWO-TV (channel 7) is a television station licensed to Lawton, Oklahoma, United States, serving the western Texoma area as an affiliate of ABC and Telemundo. It is owned by Gray Media alongside Wichita Falls, Texas–licensed CBS affiliate KAUZ-TV (channel 6). KSWO-TV's studios are located on 60th Street in southeastern Lawton, and its transmitter is located near East 1940 and North 2390 Roads in rural southwestern Tillman County, Oklahoma (near Grandfield).

== History ==
=== Early history ===
On May 22, 1952, Oklahoma Quality Broadcasting Co.—a locally based company founded by M&D Finance Co. owner Ransom H. Drewry, who co-founded the licensee with a group of shareholders that included J. R. Montgomery (then-president of Lawton's City National Bank), T. R. Warkentin, Robert P. Scott (both of whom were minority partners in locally based S.W. Stationery) and G. G. Downing—submitted an application to the Federal Communications Commission (FCC) for a construction permit to build and license to operate a broadcast television station in the Wichita Falls–Lawton market that would transmit on VHF channel 7. When the FCC awarded the license and permit for channel 7 to the Drewry-led group on December 23, 1952, the group requested and received approval to assign KSWO-TV as the call letters for his television station; the calls were taken from the Lawton radio station that Drewry founded in 1941, KSWO (1380 AM, now KKRX).

KSWO-TV first signed on the air on March 8, 1953; it was the second television station to sign on in the Wichita Falls–Lawton market, launching one week after CBS affiliate KWFT-TV (channel 6, later KSYD-TV and now KAUZ-TV)—located across the Oklahoma–Texas state line in Wichita Falls—made its debut on March 1. (Wichita Falls NBC affiliate KFDX-TV [channel 3] would sign on one month later, on April 12.) Channel 7 has been an ABC television affiliate since its debut, inheriting those rights through KSWO radio's longtime relationship with the progenitor ABC Radio Network; however, the station also maintained a secondary affiliation with the DuMont Television Network. The station originally maintained transmitter facilities located at its studios, located east of Lawton; construction on the studio facility was delayed 60 days due to inclement winter weather conditions that affected southwestern Oklahoma during the winter of that year, such so that the studio doors were covered with canvas until adequate doors were installed in the building. The transmitter was a relatively low-power unit that propagated a signal that reached over a limited 55-mile (89 km) radius spanning to Altus to the west, Wichita Falls to the south, Anadarko to the north, and Ringling to the east.

By the late 1950s, other nearby ABC affiliates (such as KTEN in Ada and KOCO-TV, which had recently relocated to Oklahoma City from Enid) began encroaching the northern and eastern fringes on KSWO's viewing area; however, wide gaps in channel 7's signal coverage existed to the south and west of Wichita Falls—the only primary ABC stations in north and west Texas at the time were Dallas affiliate WFAA-TV, and Amarillo affiliate KVII-TV (Lubbock and Abilene, respectively, did not get their own primary ABC affiliates until KAMC affiliated with the network in 1969, followed by the switch of KTXS-TV to ABC from CBS in 1979). KSWO disaffiliated from DuMont upon its shut down in 1956, amid various issues that arose from its relations with Paramount Pictures that hamstrung it from expansion; the station became a full-time ABC affiliate on November 10 of that year. On December 15, 1957, a fire caused extensive damage to the 60th Street studio facility after gasoline being used to clean a weather map caught fire.

In August 1959, the FCC gave permission for Drewry to construct a 1,059-foot-tall (323 m) tower near Grandfield, Oklahoma, which would operate at 316,000 watts of power (the maximum power allowable for stations broadcasting on VHF channels 7–13), thereby providing a more powerful signal that could extend KSWO-TV's reach to many portions of far southwestern Oklahoma and northwestern Texas where reception of the station had been marginal at best. Wichitex Radio and Television and Sydney Grayson—the respective owners of NBC affiliate KFDX-TV and CBS affiliate KSYD-TV in Wichita Falls—opposed the application, resulting in Drewry having to convince the FCC that the construction permit merited approval. The new site was located about halfway between Wichita Falls and Lawton (from a Lawton perspective, it was in the same direction as the Wichita Falls stations).

The transmitter facility was activated on February 28, 1960, extending channel 7's signal to encompass a much larger area of northwestern Texas and southwestern Oklahoma—bringing stronger reception of ABC network programming to additional areas of the two states for the first time. A second tower would be built at Grandfield for KJTL (channel 18) when it signed on in 1985.

Over the years, Ransom Drewry and his family gradually expanded their broadcasting group by acquiring other stations in the northern half of Texas: KFDA-TV in Amarillo (acquired in 1976 through Amarillo Telecasters, a partnership between R. H. Drewry and Ray Herndon, majority owner of KMID-TV in Midland); KXXV-TV in Waco (acquired in 1994); KWES-TV in Midland and Big Spring satellite KWAB-TV (both acquired in 1991); K60EE (now KTLE-LD) in Odessa (acquired in 2001); KSCM-LP in Bryan (acquired in 2006); and KEYU in Amarillo (acquired in 2009).

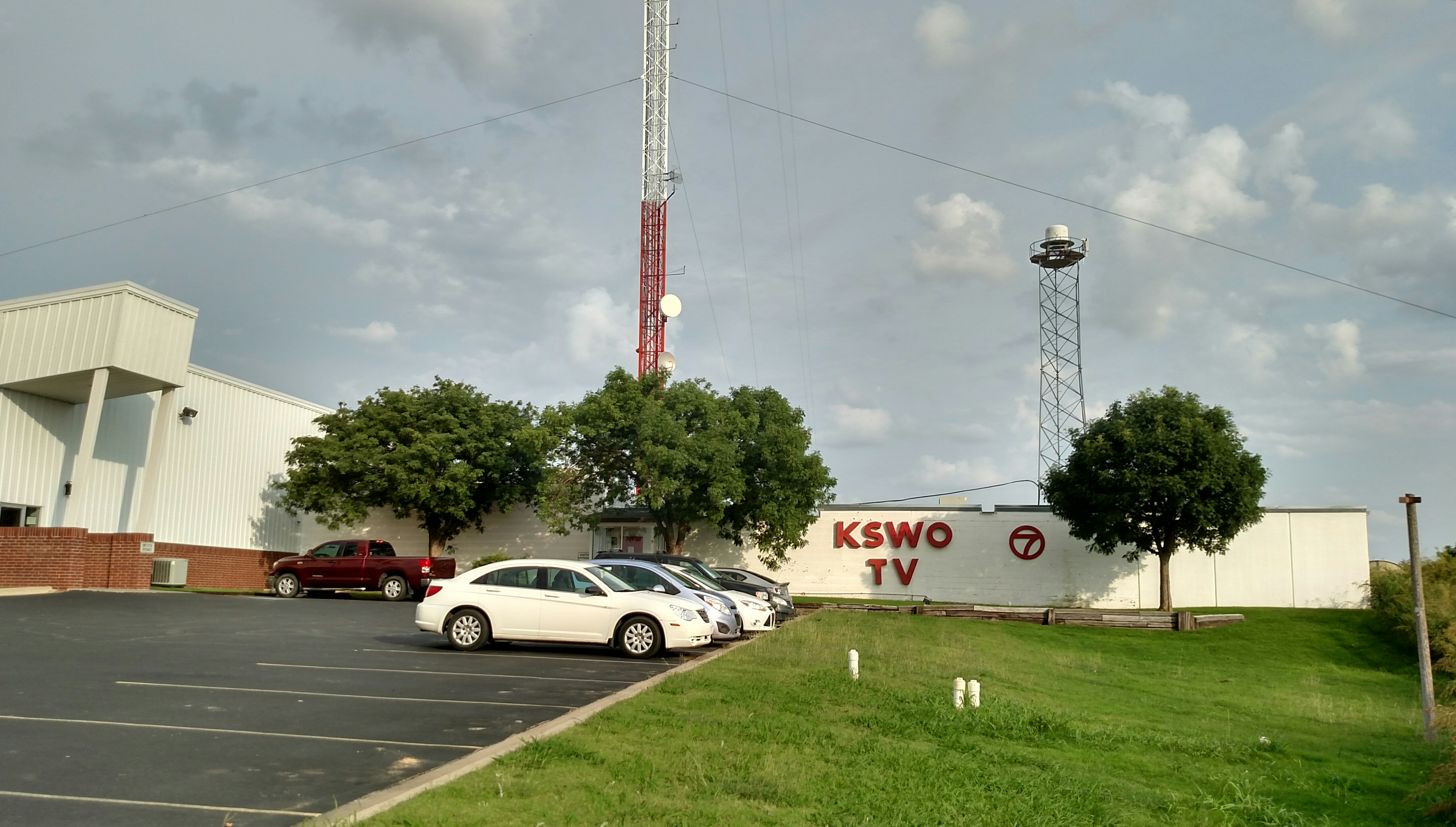
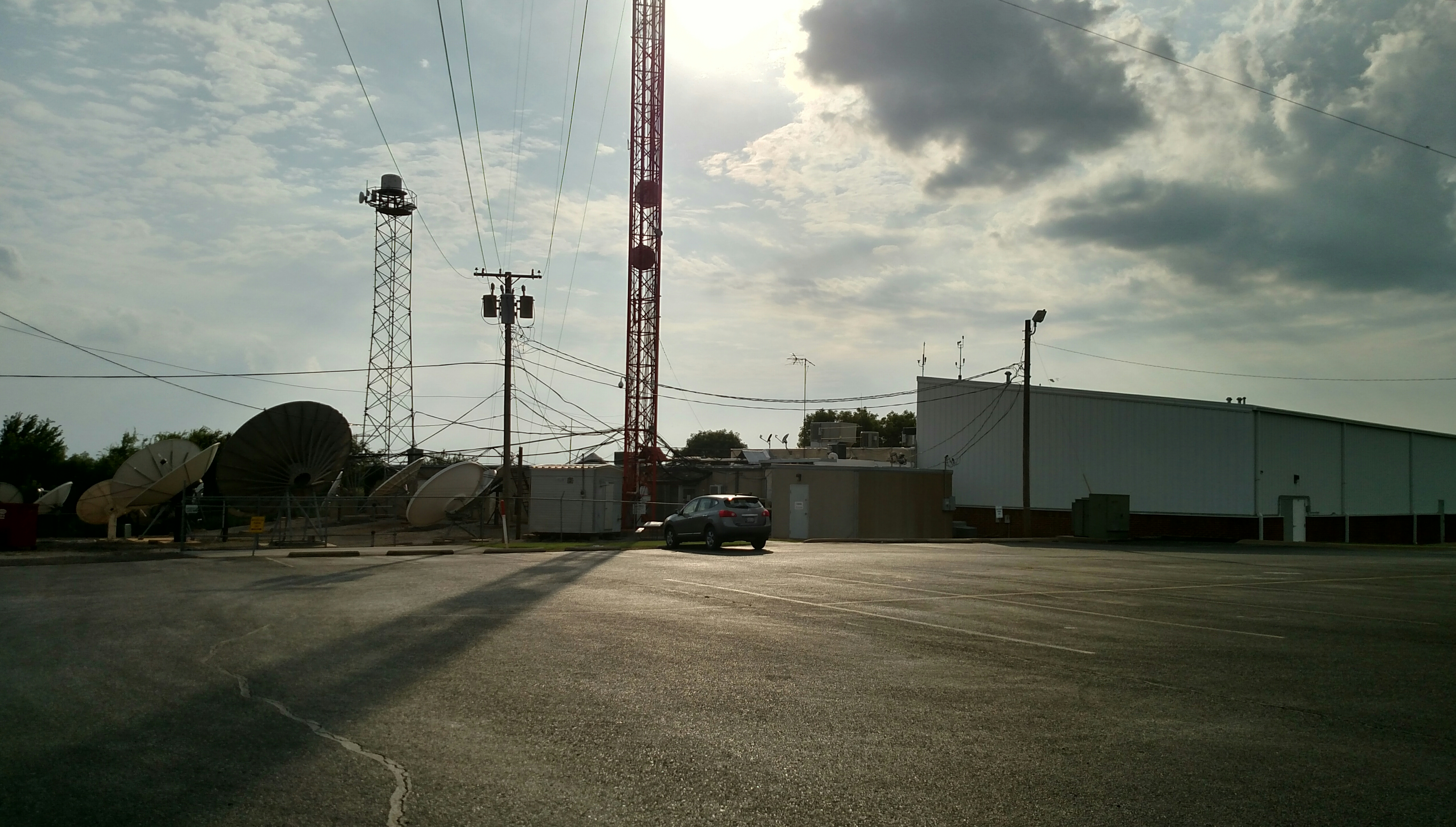
A view looking towards visitor entrance (left); a view of KSWO-TV as seen from the road; most of the satellite dishes seen here are used by Fidelity Communications's Lawton system, whose equipment is co-located in the building (right).

In December 1997, Drewry sold KSWO radio, as well as KRHD (1350 AM, now KFTP) and KRHD-FM (102.3, now KKEN) in Duncan, to Anadarko-based Monroe-Stephens Broadcasting (majority owned by media executive Stanton M. Nelson) for $425,000; the sale of the radio stations allowed the company to focus its business interests around KSWO-TV and its sister television stations in Texas.

On July 1, 2008, Drewry announced its intention to sell its eleven television stations (as well as radio station KTXC in Lamesa, Texas) to Dallas-based London Broadcasting Company—a company founded by Terry E. London, former CEO of Gaylord Entertainment, the previous year to acquire broadcast properties in small- to mid-sized markets within Texas—for $115 million. While the deal received approval by the FCC, London Broadcasting filed a notice of non-consummation to the FCC in January 2009 after company management decided to terminate the deal due to market uncertainties resulting from the Great Recession.

=== JSA with KAUZ-TV ===
On July 31, 2009, Drewry entered into a joint sales and shared services agreement with Hoak Media, under which it assumed some operational responsibilities for longtime rival KAUZ-TV. The agreement, which took effect on August 3, allowed KSWO-TV to provide advertising and promotional services for KAUZ, while Hoak would retain responsibilities over channel 6's programming (including news operations), master control and production services. The two stations did not consolidate all operations, owing to the distance between Wichita Falls and Lawton and the tailoring of each station's news service to those areas, though KAUZ-TV dismissed its general manager, news director, and sales manager, as well as a news photographer, to be replaced by staff from KSWO.

In January 2012, KSWO became the second television station in the Wichita Falls–Lawton market and the eighth station in Oklahoma to begin carrying syndicated programming in high definition. The switch was part of a series of upgrades to KSWO and KAUZ's shared master control facility at the former's Lawton studio.

=== Raycom Media ownership ===
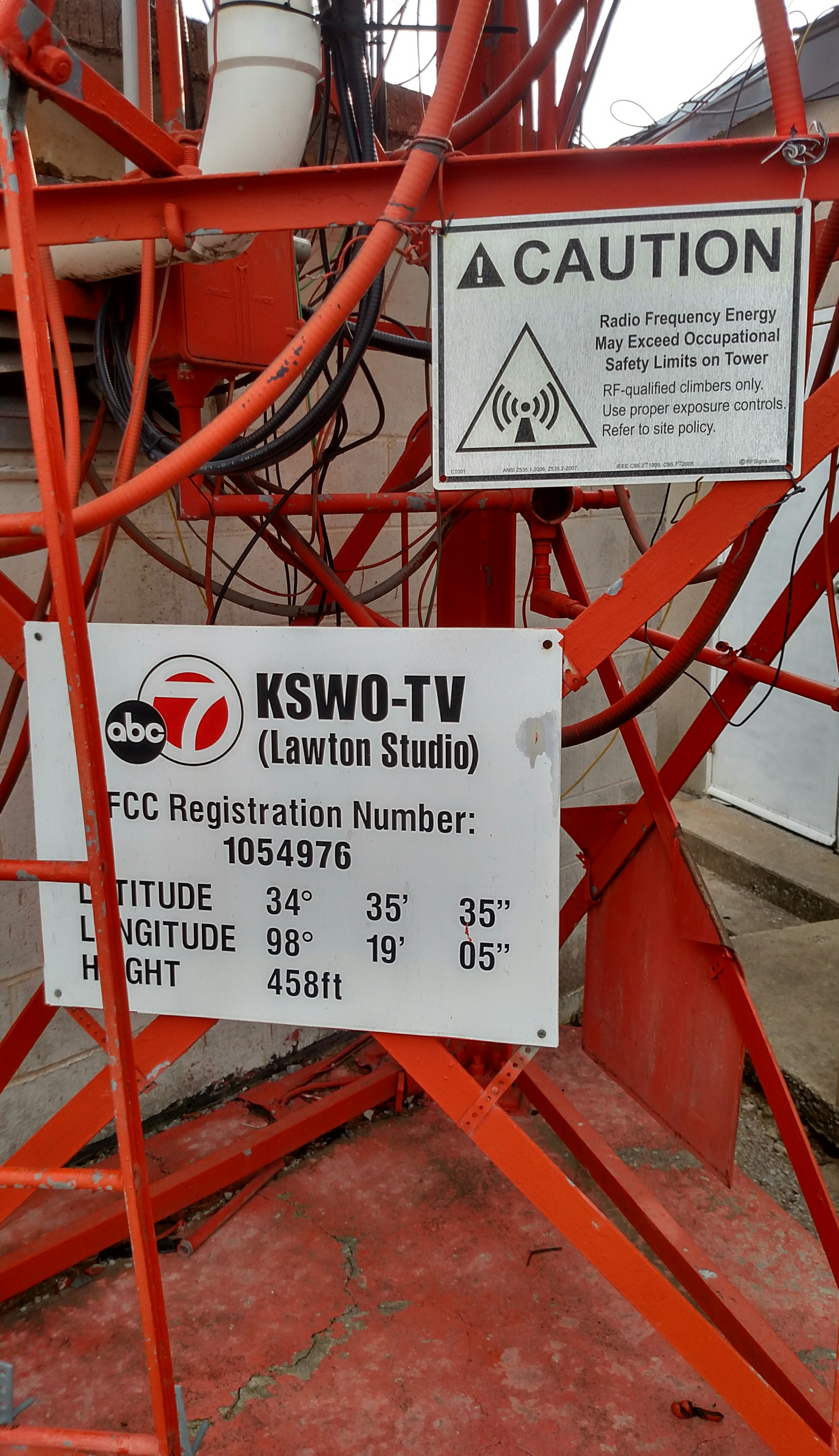
The base of the tower at KSWO-TV's Lawton studios, which sends the signal to the main Grandfield transmitter and also hosts UHF fill-in K31MK-D

On August 10, 2015, Montgomery, Alabama–based Raycom Media announced that it would purchase Drewry's eight television stations for $160 million—a handsome return on company patriarch Ransom Drewry's investment in KSWO radio 74 years earlier. As part of the deal, American Spirit Media would purchase the license of and other assets belonging to KAUZ-TV from Hoak Media. While KSWO and KAUZ would remain jointly operated, the existing joint sales agreement between KSWO and KAUZ would be terminated upon the sale's closure due to an FCC rule implemented that year, which prohibited such agreements by counting the sale of 15% or more of advertising time by one station to a competing junior partner station in the JSA as a duopoly that would not be permitted in the Wichita Falls–Lawton market under the agency's ownership rules. The sale was completed on December 1.

Upon the JSA's termination, Raycom entered into a shared services agreement with KAUZ, under which KSWO would handle news production, administrative and production operations and provide equipment and building space for that station; despite this, KAUZ remains based out of Wichita Falls and continues to largely operate independently of channel 7.

=== Sale to Gray Television ===
On June 25, 2018, Atlanta-based Gray Television announced it had reached a $3.6 billion agreement with Raycom to merge their respective broadcasting assets (consisting of Raycom's 63 existing owned-and/or-operated television stations, including KSWO and the JSA/SSA with KAUZ-TV, and Gray's 93 television stations) under Gray's corporate umbrella. The sale was approved on December 20 and was completed on January 2, 2019.

== News operation ==
As of January 2018, KSWO-TV presently broadcasts 30 hours, 5 minutes of locally produced newscasts each week (with 5 hours, 5 minutes each weekday; 2 hours, 35 minutes on Saturdays; and 2 hours, 5 minutes on Sundays). In regards to the number of hours devoted to news programming, it is the highest local newscast output among the Wichita Falls–Lawton market's broadcast television stations, tied with NBC affiliate KFDX-TV and beating KSWO's CBS-affiliated sister station KAUZ-TV's weekly news total by a half-hour. Unlike most ABC affiliates in the Central Time Zone, KSWO does not produce a midday newscast.

Because of KSWO's status as the only major network affiliate licensed to a city on the Oklahoma side of the Wichita Falls–Lawton market, the station's newscasts tend to focus more on Lawton and surrounding areas of southwestern Oklahoma, with a secondary focus on stories occurring in northwest Texas. Among the three local television news operations in the area, KSWO maintains a ratings stronghold on the Oklahoma side of the Wichita Falls–Lawton market, while KAUZ and KFDX primarily compete for the audience on the Texas side.

=== News department history ===
KSWO pioneered new developments in weather forecasting for its viewing area throughout its history, particularly in regard to its coverage of severe weather events affecting its nearly 30-county viewing area encompassing southwestern Oklahoma and western north Texas. Channel 7 was the first television station in the area to have its own on-site weather radar (which was originally displayed in black and white as the station had not yet acquired color broadcasting equipment nor did colorizing techniques for radar displays exist at the time) in the late 1950s or early 1960s, had introduced the market's first color radar in 1976 (branded as "Accu-scan 7"), and introduced the area's first Doppler weather radar in 1984 (more than ten years ahead of the installations of such a system by arch-rivals KFDX and KAUZ).

KSWO-TV has several longtime veterans who have been with the station for 20 years or longer. Jan Stratton—who also served as the station's news director until July 2006—served as evening anchor continuously for 33 years from 1981 until her retirement in January 2014. Co-anchor and former news director, David Bradley, who was with the station from 1986 until 2017 (when he accepted an anchor job at fellow ABC affiliate KVII-TV in Amarillo, Texas), originated at channel 7 with a thirteen-year tenure as sports director/weeknight sports anchor before he moved to the news side as KSWO's primary weeknight anchor in 1999. Tom Charles, a familiar face to Channel 7 viewers since the early 1960s, officially retired from KSWO-TV after 45 years of service on December 31, 2010; Charles served as chief weathercaster/meteorologist from 1964 to 1996 and then as anchor of the 5:30 a.m. newscast and co-anchor of Good Morning Texoma from 2000 to 2010 following a four-year stint as chief meteorologist at CBS affiliate KAUZ-TV. Larry Patton, who has been employed by the station since 1967, has served as general manager of KSWO-TV since 1977; Patton was inducted into the Oklahoma Association of Broadcasters Hall of Fame in March 2015.

KSWO broadcast Dr. James "Red" Duke's syndicated medical reports to viewers in Texoma throughout much of the 1980s and 1990s. The station launched a local morning newscast in 1989, when it launched the traditional news program Good Morning Texoma. Originally airing for 30 minutes from 6:30 to 7 a.m., the program would expand to one hour in September 1992, then to 1 1/2 hours in September 1999, and finally to two hours in September 2009. Good Morning Texoma would eventually expand to weekends in January 1993, making KSWO the first television station in the Wichita Falls-Lawton market to launch a weekend morning newscast, with the debut of one-hour-long Saturday and Sunday editions at 8 a.m. (the 8 a.m. edition of the weekend broadcasts would later be reduced to a half-hour in January 2010, at which time it was joined by an additional half-hour weekend edition at 6:30 a.m.).

In 1996, the station discontinued its longtime Action 7 News moniker for its newscasts and rebranded its news programming under the 7 News banner. In late May of that year, KSWO broadcast its early morning newscast, Good Morning Texoma, with limited backup electricity; the newscast was conducted virtually in the dark due to electrical outages that had affected the Lawton area after a complex of severe thunderstorms rolled through southern Oklahoma the previous night with areas of damaging straight-line winds. The only power available to the studio came from a portable generator located in one of the station's live trucks, which also served as a makeshift studio-transmitter link to relay the signal to the transmitter dish at the Grandfield site. The broadcast was done with one camera, one tape deck and one microphone (which was passed between the anchors). In 1999, the station introduced a combined newsroom/studio set that is heavily downscaled version of the "Newsplex" set used at the time by WHDH in Boston and WSVN in Miami, both of which also integrate their anchor desk within their newsrooms. (In January 2018, the "Newsplex" was repainted and remodeled to include updated duratrans and widescreen monitors; KSWO's newscasts were temporarily moved to a separate area on the newsroom's second level until the remodeling was completed.)

For the May 2009 ratings period, according to Nielsen Media Research, KSWO's newscasts ranked in first place on weekdays in the morning, 6 and 10 p.m. timeslots. However, the station has experienced a slight decline in its ratings ever since Drewry management consolidated certain news department assets belonging to Wichita Falls-based KAUZ with channel 7's news operation in the fall of 2009, and transferred longtime station manager, Mike Taylor, to KAUZ to serve as that station's general manager. Ironically, Nexstar Broadcasting Group-owned KFDX, which maintains the only other news operation in the Lawton–Wichita Falls market, has shown improvement with its ratings rather than an increase either for KAUZ or KSWO. In June 2011, KSWO began broadcasting its local newscasts in high definition, becoming the first station in the Wichita Falls-Lawton market to make the upgrade; the 9 p.m. newscast on KSWO-DT3 was included in the upgrade.

For most of the JSA/SSA's existence, KSWO and KAUZ retained fully separate local news programs, due to the stations' distance from one another and their focus on different portions of the Wichita Falls–Lawton market. The two stations began simulcasting local news for the first time on January 6, 2018, when KSWO and KAUZ consolidated production of their respective half-hour weekend 8 a.m. newscasts into a single program, under the unified title Texoma Weekend Morning News, that is simulcast on both stations and utilizes KSWO's existing weekend morning news staff (KSWO maintains a separate 6:30 a.m. newscast on Saturday and Sunday mornings, which carries the same title).

=== On-air staff ===
==== Notable former on-air staff ====
- Don Armes – agricultural reporter (1999–2002)
- Kevin Ogle – reporter (1988–1989)
- Randy Scott – sports anchor/reporter (2004–2005)

== Technical information ==
=== Subchannels ===
Logo for MeTV subchannel

The station's signal is multiplexed:

Subchannels of KSWO-TV
Subchannel	Res.	Short name	Programming
7.1	720p	KSWO-HD	ABC
7.2	720p	Telemun	Telemundo
7.3	480i	MeTV	MeTV
7.4	480i	DABL	Dabl
7.5	480i	TruCrim	True Crime Network

In 2006, KSWO-TV launched a Telemundo subchannel. The third subchannel previously aired a loop of weather forecasts, Live Well Network, and This TV; a 9 p.m. newscast aired on it from 2011 to 2014 and 2015 to 2016.

=== Analog-to-digital conversion ===
KSWO-TV shut down its analog signal, over VHF channel 7, on February 17, 2009, the original target date on which full-power television stations in the United States were to transition from analog to digital broadcasts under federal mandate. The station cited the need to place its digital antenna where the analog transmitter was located for its decision to go forward with the transition on the originally scheduled date, despite a Congressional vote the previous month that pushed back the analog-to-digital cutoff for full-power stations to June 12. The station's digital signal remained on its pre-transition VHF channel 11, using virtual channel 7.

=== Translators ===
In addition to the main Grandfield transmitter, a community-owned translator in Quanah, Texas, rebroadcasts KSWO-TV, as does a UHF fill-in translator in Lawton which was activated in January 2022. Gray also owns construction permits for further UHF fill-in translators to serve the Altus and Wichita Falls areas.

- Altus, OK: KKTM-LD 21
- Jolly/Wichita Falls, TX: K19KE-D
- Lawton, OK: K31MK-D
- Quanah, TX: K31HC-D
