= ABC 15 =

ABC 15 may refer to the following American Broadcasting Company affiliates:

- KNXV-TV in Phoenix, Arizona, which uses the abc15.com website
- KPOB-TV in Poplar Bluff, Missouri
- KRHD-CD in Bryan–College Station, Texas (branded as 15ABC; broadcasts on channel 40)
  - Semi-satellite of KXXV in Waco, Texas
- WICD (TV) in Champaign, Illinois
- WPDE-TV in Florence, South Carolina
