= Drewry Communications =

American media company (1941–2015)

Drewry Communications Group
- Type: Private
- Industry: Media
- Founded: 1941
- Founder: Ransom H. Drewry
- Defunct: December 1, 2015
- Fate: Acquired by Raycom
- Successor: Raycom Media; Gray Media
- Headquarters: Lawton, Oklahoma, United States
- Area served: Oklahoma; Texas
- Key people: Robert Drewry (President); Bill Drewry (CEO); Larry Patton (General Manager)
- Products: Broadcast television; radio

The Drewry Communications Group was a media company based in Lawton, Oklahoma, wholly owned and operated by the Drewry family. The company was run by Robert Drewry (as the company's president), Bill Drewry (as its chief executive officer), and Larry Patton (as general manager). Robert and Bill are the sons of late patriarch Ransom H. Drewry.

Drewry Communications' broadcasting properties consisted of 13 radio and television stations in Oklahoma and Texas, largely concentrated in western and central Texas.

== History ==
Ransom H. Drewry founded radio station KSWO (1380 AM, now KKRX) in Lawton, Oklahoma in 1941. Six years later in 1947, Drewry started his second radio station, KRHD (1350 AM, now KFTP) in Duncan (the KRHD call letters, derived from Drewry's initials, were later assigned to a television station in Bryan, Texas, that serves as a translator of the company's ABC affiliate in Waco, KXXV-TV). Drewry entered television broadcasting in 1953, when he and a group that included J.R. Montgomery, T.R. Warkentin, Robert P. Scott, and G.G. Downing founded KSWO-TV (channel 7) in Lawton as the city's ABC affiliate, which signed on the air on March 8 of that year.

Over the years, the Drewry family gradually acquired other stations in the northern half of Texas. Drewry, in partnership with Ray Herndon (majority owner of KMID-TV in Midland, Texas), acquired CBS affiliate KFDA-TV (channel 10) in Amarillo, Texas, in 1976 through their company, Amarillo Telecasters.

Sons Robert and Bill Drewry took over the company following the elder Drewry's death. The company expanded by acquiring, among other stations: KTPX-TV (now KWES-TV) in Midland, Texas and Big Spring satellite KWAB-TV (both in 1991); KXXV-TV in Waco (in 1994); K60EE (now KTLE-LD) in Odessa (in 2001); KSCM-LP in Bryan (in 2006), and KEYU in Amarillo (in 2009).

Drewry sold KSWO radio, as well as KRHD and KRHD-FM (102.3 FM, now KKEN at 97.1 FM), to Anadarko, Oklahoma-based Monroe-Stephens Broadcasting in 1998. The company re-entered into radio in August 2002, when Drewry purchased Regional Mexican station KTXC (104.7 FM) in Lamesa, Texas. In 2014, the company purchased in KRGN (102.9 FM) in Amarillo from Family Life Radio, and relaunched it as a Spanish-language adult hits station under the call letters KEYU-FM.

On July 1, 2008, Drewry Communications announced its intention to sell its eleven television stations to Dallas-based London Broadcasting Company—a company founded by Terry E. London the previous year to acquire broadcast properties in small- to mid-sized markets within Texas (its first being the purchase of CBS affiliate KYTX in Tyler in February 2008)—for $115 million. While the deal received approval by the Federal Communications Commission, London Broadcasting filed a notice of non-consummation to the FCC in January 2009, terminating the deal due to market uncertainties resulting from the Great Recession.

On July 31, 2009, Drewry Communications entered into a joint sales and shared services agreement with KAUZ-TV owner Hoak Media, in which KSWO-TV would provide advertising and promotional services for KAUZ (Hoak retained responsibility for that station's programming, master control and production services). Although the two stations are jointly operated, KSWO-TV and KAUZ-TV each retained separate studio facilities and news operations at their respective facilities in Lawton and Wichita Falls.

On August 10, 2015, Raycom Media announced that it would purchase Drewry Communications for $160 million; in addition to acquiring its 11 television stations, as KTXC and KEYU-FM were included in the sale, the deal marked Raycom's re-entry into radio station ownership after it sold WMC and WMC-FM in Memphis, Tennessee to Infinity Broadcasting Corporation in 2000. As part of the deal, American Spirit Media would purchase KAUZ-TV from Hoak Media. While KSWO and KAUZ remained jointly operated, the existing joint sales agreement between KSWO and KAUZ was terminated upon the sale's closure to comply with FCC rules. The sale was completed on December 1, 2015.

== Former stations ==
- Stations are arranged in alphabetical order by state and city of license.
- Two boldface asterisks appearing following a station's call letters (**) indicate a station built and signed on by Drewry.

Stations owned by Drewry Communications
Media market	State	Station	Purchased	Sold	Notes
Duncan	Oklahoma	KRHD	1947	1998	
Duncan	Oklahoma	KRHD-FM	1975	1998	
Lawton	Oklahoma	KSWO **	1941	1998	
Lawton	Oklahoma	KSWO-TV **	1953	2015	
Amarillo	Texas	KAMT-LP	2009	2010	(Note: Ceased operations in 2010.)
Amarillo	Texas	KEYU	2009	2015	
Amarillo	Texas	KEYU-FM	2014	2015	
Amarillo	Texas	KFDA-TV	1976	2015	
Amarillo	Texas	KZBZ-CD	2009	2015	
Amarillo	Texas	KTMO-LP	2001	2014	(Note: Ceased operations in 2014.)
Big Spring	Texas	KWAB-TV	1991	2015	(Note: Satellite of KWES-TV.)
Bryan	Texas	KRHD-CD	1997	2015	(Note: Semi-satellite of KXXV.)
Bryan	Texas	KSCM-LP	2006	2015	
Bryan	Texas	KUTW-LP	2009	2010	
Canyon	Texas	KTXC-LP	2006	2015	(Note: Ceased operations in 2015.)
Odessa–Midland	Texas	KTLE-LP	2001	2015	
Odessa–Midland	Texas	KTXC	2002	2015	
Odessa–Midland	Texas	KWES-TV	1991	2015	
Waco–Temple	Texas	KXXV	1994	2015	
Waco–Temple	Texas	KWKO-LP	2009	2010	
Wichita Falls	Texas	KAUZ-TV	2009	2015	(Note: Owned by Hoak Media.)
Wichita Falls	Texas	KUWF-LP	2009	2010	
