= KTXC =

KTXC may refer to:

- KTXC-LD, a low-power television station (channel 35) licensed to serve Amarillo, Texas, United States; see List of television stations in Texas
- KTXC-LP, a defunct low-power television station (channel 46) formerly licensed to serve Canyon, Texas
- KVLM, a radio station (104.7 FM) licensed to serve Lamesa, Texas, which held the call sign KTXC from 1999 to 2022
