= KAMT-LP =

Television station in Amarillo, Texas (2005–2010)

Amarillo, Texas; United States
- Channels: Analog: 50 (UHF)

Programming
- Affiliations: TeleFutura (2005–2010)

Ownership
- Owner: Drewry Communications; (Midessa Broadcasting, L.P.)
- Sister stations: KEYU, KFDA-TV, KTMO-LP, KTXC-LP

History
- Founded: January 24, 1996
- First air date: 2005
- Last air date: October 6, 2010; (license canceled)
- Former call signs: K31ET (1996–2001)
- Call sign meaning: Amarillo, Texas

Technical information
- Licensing authority: FCC
- Facility ID: 47363
- Class: TX
- ERP: 14.8 kW
- Translator(s): KEYU 31.2 Amarillo

Links
- Public license information: LMS

KAMT-LP (channel 50) was a low-power television station in Amarillo, Texas, United States, affiliated with the Spanish-language network TeleFutura. The station was owned by Drewry Communications.

== History ==
The station was founded in 2005.

On June 25, 2008, original owner Equity Media Holdings disclosed that it was selling KAMT to Luken Communications, LLC.

Equity Media Holdings has been in Chapter 11 bankruptcy since December 2008 and offers by Luken Communications to acquire Equity-owned stations in six markets have since been withdrawn. On April 10, 2009, Equity Media announced a fire sale of all television stations—KAMT was set for an asking price of $750,000. However, a buyer was not found until October, when Drewry Communications Group, then-owner of KFDA-TV (now owned by Gray Television), announced that it would purchase the station as part of a larger deal.

The station's license was surrendered to the Federal Communications Commission (FCC) on October 6, 2010, and the KAMT-LP call sign was canceled by the FCC that same day.
