= KAUZ-TV =

Television station in Wichita Falls, Texas

- Wichita Falls, Texas; Lawton, Oklahoma; United States
- City: Wichita Falls, Texas
- Channels: Digital: 22 (UHF); Virtual: 6
- Branding: NewsChannel 6

Programming
- Affiliations: 6.1: CBS; for others, see § Subchannels

Ownership
- Owner: Gray Media; (Gray Television Licensee, LLC)
- Sister stations: KSWO-TV

History
- First air date: March 1, 1953
- Former call signs: KWFT-TV (1953–1956); KSYD-TV (1956–1963)
- Former channel numbers: Analog: 6 (VHF, 1953–2009)
- Former affiliations: DuMont (secondary, 1953–1956)

Technical information
- Licensing authority: FCC
- Facility ID: 6864
- ERP: 433 kW
- HAAT: 311 m (1,020 ft)
- Transmitter coordinates: 33°54′4″N 98°32′22″W
- Translator(s): K29FR-D Quanah, TX

Links
- Public license information: Public file; LMS
- Website: www.newschannel6now.com

KAUZ-TV (channel 6) is a television station licensed to Wichita Falls, Texas, United States, serving as the CBS affiliate for the western Texoma area. It is owned by Gray Media alongside Lawton, Oklahoma–licensed dual ABC/Telemundo affiliate KSWO-TV (channel 7). KAUZ-TV's studios and transmitter are located near Seymour Highway (US 277) and West Wenonah Boulevard in western Wichita Falls.

The station also operates a translator station, K29FR-D in Quanah, Texas, to relay its programming to areas of western north Texas and extreme southwestern Oklahoma that are located outside its primary signal coverage area.

== History ==
=== Early history ===
The VHF channel 6 allocation in Wichita Falls, Texas, was contested between two groups, both of which owned radio stations in the market, that competed for approval by the Federal Communications Commission (FCC) to be the holder of the construction permit to build and license to operate a new television station on the second commercial VHF allocation to be assigned to the Wichita Falls–Lawton market. Texoma Broadcasting Co.—a consortium associated with Wichita Falls Times owner Times Publishing Co. and then-owner of local radio station KTRN (1290 AM), led by Rhea Howard, Boyd Kelley, Walter Cline, Houston Harte and Eva Mae Hanks—filed the initial permit application for the VHF channel 6 allocation on July 11, 1952.

Rowley-Brown Broadcasting—a group founded in December 1947 by Edward H. Rowley (president of Rowley United Theatres Inc.), Kenyon Brown (owner of media advertising consulting firm Kenyon Brown Inc.) and H.J. Griffith, with Rowley United Theaters Vice President John H. Rowley and Agnes D. Rowley acting as fellow minority shareholders at the time of their submission—filed a separate license application for channel 6 on July 18, 1952. Rowley-Brown also owned the city's oldest radio station, KWFT (620 AM). The FCC awarded the license to Rowley-Brown on January 6, 1953, and Rowley-Brown sought and was granted the call letters KWFT-TV, after the radio station.

KWFT-TV first signed on the air on March 1, 1953; it was the first television station to sign on in the Wichita Falls-Lawton market, debuting one week before the March 8 sign-on of ABC affiliate KSWO-TV (channel 7) in Lawton, and one month prior to the April 12 sign-on of its fellow Wichita Falls-based rival, NBC affiliate KFDX-TV (channel 3). Channel 6 has been a primary CBS affiliate since it signed on, owing to KWFT radio's longtime affiliation with the CBS Radio Network. Initially, KWFT-TV held a secondary affiliation with the DuMont Television Network, carrying select programs from the network until it ceased operations in August 1956; during the late 1950s, the station was briefly affiliated with the NTA Film Network.

On December 9, 1955, Rowley-Brown sold KWFT-TV to KSYD-TV Inc.—a consortium led by Sydney A. Grayson and Nat Levine, then-owners of Wichita Falls radio station KSYD (990 AM), which had been co-owned with KFDX-TV under prior ownership two years earlier—for $75,000 plus $73,366.40 allocated for color and transmission equipment not yet in use; concurrently, Brown acquired John H. and E. H. Rowley's respective interests in KWFT radio. The sale was approved on January 11, 1956, at which time channel 6's call letters were changed to KSYD-TV. Like its radio sister, it took its calls from its parent company's principal owner. On December 1, 1962, Grayson sold the television station to Mid-New York Broadcasting—a company owned by Albany, New York, businessman Paul F. Harron, which then owned WKTV in Utica, New York, and the World Broadcasting System radio service—for $2.35 million; the sale received regulatory approval 3 1/2 months later on March 13, 1963. On July 31 of that year, the station changed its call letters to KAUZ-TV, which were chosen as part of a contest held by the Harron group that was open to media agency and advertiser personnel. (The calls were submitted by H. Wendell Eastling, a media director for Minneapolis-based Knox-Reeves Advertising, who won the grand prize of an MG sports car and a trip for two to Wichita Falls.)

In February 1966, KAUZ became the first television station in the Wichita Falls-Lawton market to begin broadcasting its local newscasts in color, making the transition just a few months after CBS began converting most of its network programming content from black-and-white to color. KFDX and KSWO followed in upgraded production of their respective newscasts to the color format in 1967. Also in 1967, KAUZ-TV was one of several stations nationwide to broadcast The Las Vegas Show, a short-lived late night program from the ill-fated Overmyer Network that ran for a few weeks. On November 3, 1967, Mid-New York Broadcasting sold KAUZ-TV to Bass Brothers Telecasters—led by investor/philanthropist Perry R. Bass, then-owner of KFDA-TV in Amarillo and satellites KFDW-TV in Clovis, New Mexico, and KFDO-TV in Sayre, Oklahoma, and 25% owner of KAAR-TV in San Diego—for $3.1 million; the sale was approved by the FCC on April 12 of that year.

In July 1970, two men who were hired to paint the mast on the station's transmitter tower—located on the premises of the KAUZ studio complex, which is said to be coordinated at one of the highest points within the city of Wichita Falls—lost their balance on the apparatus they were standing and fell several hundred feet to the ground; one man was killed, while another was seriously injured. In the late winter of early 1974, Bass Brothers Telecasters sold the station to Forward Communications—a locally based company (doing business as Wichita Falls Telecasters II) owned by local beer distributor Ray Clymer and White Fuel Corp. executive W. Erle White—for $4.25 million; the sale was approved by the FCC on September 19.

On July 22, 1983, Wichita Falls Telecasters II sold KAUZ-TV to Adams Communications (owned by Minneapolis-based investment banker Stephen Adams) for $10.925 million; the sale was approved on January 5, 1984. Adams sold KAUZ, along with seven of its other television stations—WHOI in Peoria, Illinois, WWLP in Springfield, Massachusetts, WILX-TV in Lansing, KOSA-TV in Midland, WTRF-TV in Wheeling, West Virginia, WMTV in Madison, Wisconsin, and WSAW-TV in Wausau, Wisconsin—to Boca Raton, Florida–based Brissette Broadcasting (owned by media executive Paul Brissette) for $257 million in late 1991; the sale, approved by the FCC on December 24 of that year, was completed in February 1992. In September 1995, Brissette sold KAUZ and its seven other television stations to Benedek Broadcasting for $270 million; the sale was finalized on June 7, 1996. The station signed off on a nightly basis until September 1998, when KAUZ-TV began maintaining a 24-hour programming schedule on Sunday through Thursday nights, initially filling overnight time periods following the CBS late night lineup with a mix of syndicated programs and the network's overnight newscast, Up to the Minute (reducing KAUZ's off-hours to late Friday night/early Saturday mornings and late Saturday night/early Sunday mornings); channel 6 expanded its 24-hour schedule to weekends in September 2001.

On April 2, 2002, Benedek—which had filed for Chapter 11 bankruptcy on March 22—announced it would sell off its 22 television stations, most of which were based in the Midwestern and Western United States, to Albany, Georgia–based Gray Communications Systems for $500 million. Benedek subsequently agreed to sell KAUZ to Chelsey Broadcasting in June 2002; the sale, completed on October 21, 2002, was part of a $30 million piecemeal group acquisition by Chelsey (a major creditor of Benedek) that also involved seven of KAUZ's sister stations (WHOI, WYTV in Youngstown, Ohio, KDLH-TV in Duluth, Minnesota, KMIZ-TV in Columbia, Missouri, KGWN-TV in Cheyenne, Wyoming, KGWC-TV in Casper, Wyoming and KHQA-TV in Quincy, Illinois) that Gray had chosen not to acquire. In September 2003, Chelsey agreed to sell KAUZ to Hoak Media for $8.2 million.

=== JSA with KAUZ-TV ===
On July 31, 2009, Lawton-based Drewry Communications—then-owner of KSWO-TV—purchased the non-license assets of KAUZ from Hoak Media and assumed some operational responsibilities for KAUZ under joint sales and shared services agreements. The agreement, which took effect on August 3, allowed KSWO-TV to provide advertising and promotional services for KAUZ, while Hoak would retain responsibilities over channel 6's programming (including news operations), master control operations and production services.

The JSA/SSA arrangement resulted in all five of the market's major commercial television stations—as well as the affiliates of all six of the largest English-language networks—being placed under the operational control of two entities, as Nexstar Media Group already owns KFDX-TV, and operates Fox affiliate KJTL (channel 18) and MyNetworkTV affiliate KJBO-LP (channel 35) through a shared services agreement with the owner of the latter two stations, Mission Broadcasting. However, unlike the SSA formed in 1999 between KFDX and KJTL when the latter was purchased by Mission, the operations of KAUZ remained largely autonomous from those of KSWO; both stations maintain separate studio facilities (KSWO continues to operate from its longtime facility on 60th Street in southeastern Lawton, more than a one-hour drive from KAUZ's Seymour Highway facility), news departments and non-management staff. However, KAUZ-TV laid off four staffers following the formation of the JSA/SSA—general manager Mike deLier, news director Dan Garcia, sales manager Randy Stone and news photographer Jim Allen—with those positions being assumed by existing KSWO-TV staff.

In January 2012, KAUZ-TV became the third television station in the Wichita Falls-Lawton market to being carrying syndicated programming in high definition. The switch was part of a series of upgrades to KSWO and KAUZ's shared master control facility at the former's Lawton studio, which also allowed the seamless insertion of on-screen severe weather alert maps, news and school/event closing tickers, and Emergency Alert System tests during network and syndicated programming on both stations without downgrading HD content to standard definition.

In February 2014, Hoak reached an agreement to sell KAUZ's license assets to KAUZ Media, Inc., a company controlled by Bill W. Burgess, Jr.; the joint sales and shared services agreements with KSWO were to continue following the license transfer. The maneuver occurred after Hoak had sold its other television properties to Gray Television in November 2013.

=== Sale to American Spirit Media ===
On August 5, 2015, Hoak Media requested to the FCC to dismiss the sale of the KAUZ license to KAUZ Media as a result of reports that Montgomery, Alabama–based Raycom Media was nearing an agreement to purchase Drewry Communications. On August 10, Raycom announced its $160 million acquisition of Drewry's eight television stations for $160 million; as part of the deal, American Spirit Media—a partner company that largely owns stations under shared services agreements with Raycom in markets where the latter also owns a station—would purchase the license of and other assets belonging to KAUZ-TV from Hoak Media.

While KSWO and KAUZ would remain jointly operated, the existing joint sales agreement between KSWO and KAUZ would be terminated upon the sale's closure due to an FCC rule implemented that year, which prohibited new and existing agreements involving the sale of 15% or more of advertising time by one station to a competing junior partner station in the JSA, a rulemaking that would count such agreements as a duopoly in violation with the agency's ownership rules (the Wichita Falls–Lawton market has only four full-power television stations, four fewer than that allowed to legally form a duopoly, with the remaining stations consisting of low-power outlets). Upon the JSA's termination, Raycom entered into a shared services agreement with KAUZ, under which KSWO would handle news production, administrative and production operations, and provide equipment and building space for that station; despite this, KAUZ remained based out of Wichita Falls and continued to largely operate independently of channel 7.

=== Transfer of SSA to Gray Television ===
On June 25, 2018, Gray Television announced it had reached an agreement with Raycom to merge their respective broadcasting assets under Gray's corporate umbrella, in a cash-and-stock merger transaction valued at $3.6 billion. The sale was approved on December 20, and was completed on January 2, 2019.

Gray Media announced on July 1, 2026, that it would buy American Spirit Media's six stations, including KAUZ, for $50 million; the deal is permissible because of the 2025 federal appeals court decision Zimmer Radio of Mid-Missouri v. FCC, which struck down limitations on one company owning two of the top four stations in a market.

== KAUZ-DT2 ==
The history of KAUZ-DT2 traces back to the September 21, 1998, launch of a cable-only affiliate of The WB that was originally managed and promoted by Time Warner Cable (TWC), alongside the launch of The WB 100+ Station Group, a national service that was created to expand coverage of The WB via primarily local origination channels managed by cable providers to smaller areas with a Nielsen Media Research market ranking above #100. The channel—which was branded on-air as "KWB", an unofficial callsign assigned by TWC as it was a cable-exclusive outlet not licensed by the Federal Communications Commission (in addition to being carried on Time Warner Cable's Wichita Falls system, the channel was carried on other cable systems within the market, including Fidelity Communications in Lawton). Before the launch of "KWB", viewers in the Lawton–Wichita Falls market received WB network programming via the superstation feed of Chicago affiliate WGN-TV beginning at the network's January 1995 launch; residents in the northern portions of the market began receiving the network over-the-air through Oklahoma City affiliate KOCB after it converted into a WB affiliate in January 1998.

On January 24, 2006, the respective parent companies of UPN and The WB, CBS Corporation and the Warner Bros. Entertainment division of Time Warner, announced that they would dissolve the two networks to create The CW Television Network, a joint venture between the two media companies that initially featured programs from its two predecessor networks as well as new series specifically produced for The CW. Subsequently, on February 22, 2006, News Corporation announced the launch of MyNetworkTV, a network operated by Fox Television Stations and its syndication division Twentieth Television that was created to primarily to provide network programming to UPN and WB stations that The CW decided against affiliating based on their local viewership standing in comparison to the outlet that The CW ultimately chose as its charter outlets, giving these stations another option besides converting to a general entertainment independent format.

On April 10, in a joint announcement by the network and Hoak Media, KAUZ-TV was confirmed as The CW's charter affiliate for the Wichita Falls-Lawton market; Hoak Media subsequently assumed the operations of "KWB", which was expected to take over the CW affiliation, and converted the channel to an over-the-air digital feed on KAUZ-DT 6.2 to provide The CW's programming to Wichita Falls–Lawton area viewers who do not subscribe to cable television; KAUZ-DT2 became an affiliate of the network's small-market feed, The CW Plus, when the network debuted on September 18, 2006. All programming from The CW Plus on KAUZ-DT2 is received through The CW's programming feed for smaller media markets, along with a set schedule of syndicated programming acquired by The CW during time periods without network programs; however, American Spirit Media handled the local advertising and promotional services for the subchannel.

KAUZ subsequently began producing a half-hour prime-time newscast at 9 p.m. for KAUZ-DT2, which aired only on Monday through Friday nights, under the title NewsChannel 6 at 9:00. The KAUZ-produced program would gain additional prime-time news competitors beginning with the launch of a half-hour prime time newscast in that timeslot on KJTL (channel 18), a program that NBC-affiliated sister station KFDX-TV began producing for the Fox affiliate in September 2007 after cancelling a similar production seven years earlier, and later on September 14, 2010, when ABC affiliate KSWO-TV began producing a half-hour newscast for its Live Well Network–affiliated subchannel on virtual channel 7.2 (which itself was canceled on December 31, 2014, as a result of KSWO-DT2 [now a MeTV affiliate] assuming the This TV affiliation). KAUZ discontinued its 9 p.m. newscast following the July 18, 2017, edition, with off-network syndicated sitcoms carried from The CW Plus feed replacing it. In early 2015, KAUZ upgraded the "Texoma CW" subchannel to 720p high definition, providing over-the-air access to HD content from The CW in the Wichita Falls-Lawton market for the first time; the prime time newscast was not upgraded to HD until January 2016.

On September 1, 2024, KAUZ-DT2 disaffiliated from The CW Plus, and the network was then moved to KFDX-DT3. KFDX-TV's parent company, Nexstar Media Group, became a majority owner of The CW in 2022. KAUZ then moved its 24-hour local news and weather channel NewsChannel 6 24/7 from KAUZ-DT4 to KAUZ-DT2 on the date of the switch and KAUZ-DT4 was then replaced with Laff, which was previously carried on KFDX-DT3 prior to the affiliation switch. NewsChannel 6 24/7 was discontinued on November 13, 2024, and was replaced by TeleXitos, a Spanish-language diginet owned by Telemundo.

In September 2026, TeleXitos was replaced by programming from Gray Broadcast Sports Networks as the Red River Valley Sports Network.

== Programming ==
KAUZ clears the entire CBS network schedule, with one exception. Due to its half-hour Saturday morning newscast, the CBS WKND block airs a half-hour later than on most CBS affiliates, and also airs over two days (the first 2 1/2 hours of the block air on Saturdays and the remaining half-hour airs on Sunday mornings).

Among the local programs aired by KAUZ in previous years were Kauzey's Korner (later titled Kauzmo's Kolorful Kartoons), a long-running weekday afternoon children's program that aired on channel 6 from 1963 to 1967, whose titular host "Kauzmo" (played by Ronald "Cosmo" Gresham, an outspoken political activist, two-time Hawaii Big Island mayoral candidate and one-time County Council candidate) was named for the station's call letters. One episode of the series is reported to have introduced country singer Willie Nelson to television viewers for the first time. After Gresham relocated to Hawaii years later, the character of "Kauzmo" would later become known as "Cosmo", when he hosted a public access program on Jones Spacelink/Hawaiian Cablevision of Hilo titled "Cosmic Express" (named after his Cosmic Express newsletter), which featured news, political commentary, law study, spirituality, music (often played by Cosmo himself on flute or other instruments he made himself) and guest interviews (the Dalai Lama was among that program's notable guests).

From 1979 to 1982, KAUZ served as the local rightsholder for the syndicated news and features program PM Magazine, which included both national inserts produced by program distributor Group W and local inserts produced by KAUZ (independent of the news department); during its tenure on the station, PM aired each weeknight at 6:30 p.m. following the station's 6 p.m. newscast.

=== Past program preemptions and deferrals ===
Between September 1985 and August 1993, KAUZ-TV was one of several CBS stations to air the network's late-night lineup—respectively consisting of the CBS Late Movie / CBS Late Night block, the short-lived Pat Sajak Show, and finally, the Crimetime After Primetime block during that period—a half-hour later in order to air syndicated programming following its 10 p.m. newscast. From 1982 to 1998, the station preempted CBS's overnight newscasts—CBS News Nightwatch and, later, Up to the Minute—as the station signed off each night at 1 a.m.; Up to the Minute would begin to be cleared by the station in September 1998, when KAUZ adopted a 24-hour-a-day programming schedule. From September 1992 to September 1993, KAUZ also preempted the CBS Morning News in order to accommodate an expanded hour-long edition of its weekday morning news and agriculture program, Country Morning (which eventually evolved into a conventionally formatted newscast, now titled Newschannel 6 This Morning, after co-hosts and now-former KWFS [1290 AM] radio hosts Mike Campbell and Joe Tom White—now hosts of KFDX's Texoma Country Morning—left the station in December 1993) as well as a simulcast of Headline News.

From 1994 until June 24, 2018, the station also aired both CBS News Sunday Morning and Face the Nation on a one-hour delay on Sundays (following a similar scheduling structure for both programs as that implemented by fellow CBS affiliates KOTV-DT in Tulsa and KOAM-TV in Pittsburg, Kansas–Joplin, Missouri); as part of a reorganization of the station's Sunday morning lineup, KAUZ moved both programs to their network-recommended slots (at 8 and 9:30 a.m., from their prior 9 and 10:30 a.m. slots) on July 1, 2018.

=== News operation ===
As of September 2016, KAUZ presently broadcasts 17 hours, 5 minutes of locally produced newscasts each week (with 3 hours, 5 minutes each weekday; 35 minutes on Saturdays and 1 hour, 5 minutes on Sundays).

==== News department history ====
A longtime fixture of the station's noon newscast during the 1960s and early 1970s was Donna's Notebook, an interview segment hosted by Donna Colburn that discussed local events and issues. An interview segment similar to Donna's Notebook, which is used mostly to promote local and area events, remains an integral part of KAUZ's noon newscast to this day. Also featured within the noon newscast during that same period was a five-minute televised insert of Paul Harvey News and Comments, a feature that was syndicated to television stations throughout the United States. Lynn Walker, who served as anchor and news director at KAUZ from 1972 to 1986 and again from 1999 to 2003, is among the longest-tenured news anchors in the Wichita Falls-Lawton television market, with his broadcast journalism career in the market also having included a stint at KSWO-TV from 1996 to 1999 (Walker would later become the city editor at the Wichita Falls Times Record News).

During the late morning of April 3, 1964, a devastating tornado (later retroactively rated as an F5 on the Fujita Scale) swept across the northern portion of Wichita Falls and neighboring Sheppard Air Force Base. The event made history as it would become one of the first tornadoes ever to be shown on live television. KAUZ-TV interrupted regular programming that morning to provide a live tornado warning in which the image of the supercell thunderstorm was shown on the station's weather radar by then-meteorologist Ted Shaw. The station's weather staff received permission to relocate a large, heavy studio camera outside the Channel 6 studios on Seymour Highway, and pointed toward the tornado—which initially appeared as a large, rotating dust cloud—as it approached the northwest portion of Wichita Falls, with Shaw and reporter Dee Fletcher providing commentary, warning viewers of the approaching funnel, and cameraman Carl Nichols recording the footage. KAUZ's coverage of the tornadoes earned a "Best on the Scene News Coverage" award by the Texas Association of Broadcasters. The tornado, which had a peak width of 800 feet (240 m), killed seven people and injured 111 others. Damage estimates exceeded $15 million and some 225 homes and businesses were destroyed on the north side of town and at Sheppard AFB.

In 1977, KAUZ became the first television station in the area to feature a mixed-gender anchor team on its newscasts (a trend which had steadily become commonplace on news-producing television stations in other media markets across the nation); that year, Walker was teamed up with co-anchor Kay Shannon on the 6 and 10 p.m. broadcasts, a move which served as the linchpin for the start of a nine-year tenure in which KAUZ-TV took first place in the local news ratings against rivals KFDX and KSWO. Longtime sports anchor Bill Jackson joined the team by early 1978, followed by the arrival of chief meteorologist Rich Segal that spring. The popular main anchor team would enjoy a long (by the standards of a small-market station) tenure of eight years until 1986 when Walker, Shannon and Jackson left KAUZ-TV; Rich Segal, meanwhile, would continue to head the station's weather department for another four years before he departed as well in 1990.

About 15 years after the F5 tornado that hit northwestern Wichita Falls, on April 10, 1979, an equally devastating F4 tornado hit the southwest side of the city. Rich Segal, who was chief meteorologist at KAUZ at the time, was on the air that afternoon and evening, providing complete coverage of the multiple supercell thunderstorms that spawned tornadoes across northwest Texas and southwestern Oklahoma (which included strong tornadoes that hit areas such as Vernon and Lockett, Texas, and Lawton, Oklahoma); the station's coverage culminated with the opening of the 6 p.m. broadcast of Eyewitness News that evening as a multiple-vortex tornado had reached the southwest corner of the city and began its path of destruction across southern Wichita Falls. About less than five minutes into the newscast, KAUZ-TV and several other television and radio stations in the Wichita Falls area were knocked off the air due to power outages resulting from the damaging storms. The station sent camera crews to gather footage of the storm's aftermath, which it distributed to other television stations around the country, CBS News and the other major networks. The twister that hit Wichita Falls killed 42 people and injured more than 1,700, along a 45-mile-long (72 km), two-mile-wide (3.2 km) path; in addition to the terrible human costs, 3,100 homes were destroyed, and an estimated 20,000 people were left homeless, with total damage estimates in Wichita Falls running around $400 million. A year later, Channel 6 broadcast a half-hour documentary about the 1979 tornado, Coming Back, chronicling the events of April 10 that led up to the Wichita Falls storm, the destruction and the tornado's aftermath (based upon the station's news footage taken during and after the storm) as well as the progress of recovery efforts as of April 1980.

Among the Wichita Falls–Lawton market's local television news operations, KAUZ primarily competes for viewers living on the Texas side of the market with KFDX as its principal competitor there, while KSWO maintains a ratings stronghold on the Oklahoma side of the market. For the July 2008 ratings period, according to Nielsen Media Research, KAUZ was ranked last in all time slots (except at noon, where KAUZ's newscast in that slot was in second place to its only news competition in that timeslot, KFDX). KAUZ was third for the rest of day, with its 5, 6 and 10 p.m. broadcasts (these trends continued in the November 2008 and November 2009 ratings period). For February 2010, the newly rebranded KAUZ saw a decline in its ratings, with the weekend evening newscasts, in particular, seeing its audience share numbers drop by nearly half. The morning newscast, NewsChannel 6 This Morning, continued to not place hashmarks (viewership too low to validly register a ratings point) in viewership in the diary book, while all of the evening broadcasts remained a distant third in the Lawton-Wichita Falls market.

In the 2010 ratings periods, including the February, May, July and November sweeps, Nielsen reported that viewership for KAUZ's newscasts continued to struggle in all time slots. The morning newscasts, in particular, continued in a distant third place behind those aired by competitors KFDX and KSWO; the May ratings also revealed that severe weather coverage was dominated by KSWO, with KAUZ experiencing low ratings for its storm coverage during tornado events that affected the area in early May 2010.

Chris Horgen, who assumed co-anchor duties of for the weeknight 6 and 10 p.m. newscasts in 2007, had previously served as the station's sports director for several years. Andy Austin, who previously served as the station's sports director during the 1990s, returned to that position at KAUZ in April 2007 after serving as sports information director for the past several years at Midwestern State University in Wichita Falls, and stayed at channel 6 until May 2008. Former weekend sports anchor Jermaine Ferrell assumed duties as sports director until early 2009, and then that position was vacant until Adam Ostrow was hired later in the year.

In June 2012, KAUZ began broadcasting its local newscasts in high definition, becoming the third and final station in the Wichita Falls-Lawton market to make the upgrade; the 9 p.m. newscast on KAUZ-DT2 was not included in the upgrade as the subchannel transmitted in standard definition at the time. For the 2012 calendar year, KAUZ remained a distant third place in the ratings for all time slots in each of the key sweeps periods. Part of the reason is believed to be the operational structure stemming from the JSA/SSA with usually dominant KSWO, which is always favored before KAUZ. This parallels the situation that occurred in the Scranton–Wilkes-Barre market, where that market's NBC affiliate, WBRE-TV, all but dwarfed fellow CBS affiliate WYOU in the local news ratings to the point that WYOU suspended its newscasts entirely for three years beginning in 2009 (although KAUZ's decline had begun long before the commencement of the JSA/SSA arrangement with KSWO).

For most of the JSA/SSA's existence, KSWO and KAUZ retained fully separate local news programs, due to the stations' distance from one another and their focus on different portions of the Wichita Falls–Lawton market. The two stations began simulcasting local news for the first time on January 6, 2018, when KAUZ replaced its half-hour weekend morning newscast at 8 a.m. with the Texoma Weekend Morning News, a program produced out of KSWO's studios on 60th Street in southeastern Lawton that is simulcast on both stations and utilizes KSWO's existing weekend morning news staff (KSWO maintains a separate 6:30 a.m. newscast on Saturday and Sunday mornings, which carries the same title; KAUZ would begin simulcasting the Sunday edition of that broadcast on July 1, 2018, with the 8 a.m. simulcast being relegated to Saturdays).

==== Notable former on-air staff ====
- Bob Barry Jr. – weekend sports anchor/reporter (1981–1982)
- Lorianne Crook – reporter (1980s)
- Steven Romo – anchor (2009–2010)

== Technical information ==
=== Subchannels ===
The station's signal is multiplexed:

Subchannels of KAUZ-TV
Subchannel	Res.	Short name	Programming
6.1	1080i	KAUZ-HD	CBS
6.2	720p	RRV	Red River Valley Sports Network
6.3	480i	ION	Ion
6.4	480i	LAFF	Laff
6.5	480i	CourtTV	Court TV
6.6	480i	IONPlus	Ion Plus

=== Analog-to-digital conversion ===
KAUZ-TV shut down its analog signal, over VHF channel 6, on May 21, 2009. Then-owner Hoak Media had filed a request to the FCC that March (with approval being received for the hardship waiver on March 31, despite the fact that KAUZ did not meet the technical criteria to obtain it) to permit the shutdown of KAUZ's analog signal ahead of the federally determined transition date of June 12, in order to install its digital antenna on the tower mast that housed the station's analog transmitter. The station had been among ten stations throughout the U.S. that were granted waiver extensions to boost the coverage area of their digital signals three months prior to the grant of the hardship waiver, in order to allow signal testing by satellite providers to delay importation of any nearby CBS affiliates into the market for viewers who did not receive an adequate signal of KAUZ. The station's digital signal remained on its pre-transition UHF channel 22, using virtual channel 6.

Prior to the digital transition, KAUZ's audio feed could be heard on radio receivers in Wichita Falls and surrounding areas on 87.7 FM, albeit transmitting at a slightly lower volume than other FM radio stations due to the modulation standards with the VHF-high band.
