= KTMO =

KTMO may refer to:

- KTMO (FM), a radio station (106.5 FM) licensed to New Madrid, Missouri, United States
- KTMO-LP, a defunct low-power television station (channel 36) formerly licensed to Amarillo, Texas, United States
