= KSCM-LP =

Television station in Bryan, Texas (1997–2017)

Bryan, Texas; United States
- Channels: Analog: 18 (UHF)
- Branding: Telemundo Central Texas

Programming
- Affiliations: Telemundo (1997–2017)

Ownership
- Owner: Raycom Media; (KXXV License Subsidiary, LLC)
- Sister stations: KXXV / KRHD-CD

History
- First air date: March 17, 1997
- Last air date: November 14, 2017 (date of license surrender)
- Former call signs: K12ON (1991–1997)

Technical information
- Facility ID: 54417
- Class: TX
- ERP: 54 kW
- HAAT: 127 m (417 ft)
- Transmitter coordinates: 30°45′26.8″N 96°28′4.6″W
- Translator(s): KXXV 25.2 Waco; KRHD-CD 40.2 Bryan

KSCM-LP (channel 18) was a low-power television station in Bryan, Texas, United States, which was affiliated with the Spanish-language network Telemundo. Owned by Raycom Media, the station was a simulcast of the second digital subchannel of Waco-licensed ABC affiliate KXXV (channel 25) and its Bryan-based semi-satellite KRHD-CD (channel 40). KSCM-LP's transmitter was located northwest of Bryan on US 190/SH 6 in unincorporated southern Robertson County.

== History ==
In April 2006, Drewry Communications reached an agreement with R. D. Harris to purchase KSCM-LP for a reported $125,000. On August 10, 2015, Raycom Media announced that it would purchase Drewry Communications for $160 million. The sale was completed on December 1.

Raycom Media surrendered the station's license for cancellation on November 14, 2017. It had a construction permit to flash-cut to digital on channel 18; these facilities were never built.
