= Raycom Media =

American television broadcast company (1996–2019)

Raycom Media, Inc.
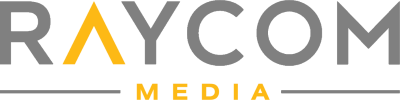
- Type: Private
- Industry: Broadcast television Television production
- Founded: 1996; 30 years ago
- Founders: Stephen Burr; Ken Hawkins; William Zortman
- Defunct: January 2, 2019; 7 years ago
- Fate: Assets merged into Gray Television
- Successor: Gray Media
- Headquarters: Montgomery, Alabama, U.S.
- Area served: United States (Nationwide)
- Key people: Pat LaPlatney (president & CEO)
- Revenue: $2.4 billion
- Number of employees: 8,300
- Subsidiaries: Broadview Media; Community Newspaper Holdings; Pure Cars; Raycom Sports; RTM Productions; Tupelo Raycom

Raycom Media, Inc. was an American television broadcasting company based in Montgomery, Alabama. Raycom owned and/or provided services for 65 television stations and two radio stations across 44 markets in 20 states. Through its Community Newspaper Holdings subsidiary, Raycom also owned multiple newspapers in small and medium-sized markets throughout the United States.

== History ==
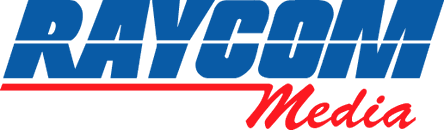
Raycom Media's logo from its 1996 founding until December 2017, using elements from the original Raycom Sports logo

Raycom's three founding owners were Stephen Burr (a Boston lawyer), Ken Hawkins (general manager) and William Zortman (news director) with funding from Retirement Systems of Alabama. In 1996, Raycom purchased 15 television and two radio stations and Bert Ellis's Raycom Sports from Ellis Communications for over $700 million. In mid-1996, the company agreed to purchase eight stations from Federal Enterprises Inc., based in suburban Detroit, for $160 million. Raycom bought Aflac's broadcast division of five TV stations in August 1996, using, in part, a loan from the RSA. The three groups merged to form Raycom Media. John Hayes initially headed up the company until 2001.

In 1998, Raycom took a 35% stake in Worldnow, an internet publishing provider for broadcast media.^{:2} That same year, Raycom purchased Malrite Communications, owner of five stations: two Puerto Rico stations (counting a semi-satellite station), three Ohio stations, and one Florida station.

In 2001, Paul McTear took over as Raycom's president and CEO from Hayes.^{:2} In 2003, Raycom Media bought out all of the Fox-affiliated television stations from Waitt Broadcasting.

In April 2005, Raycom tested The Tube Music Network on station WFLX, a Fox affiliate, for three weeks. Raycom announced on April 25, 2005, it was the launch station group for The Tube affiliating 29 stations. Raycom launched the network in June 2005 on 30 stations. Raycom Media was an initial round investor in The Tube Music Network.

On January 31, 2006, the company acquired the Liberty Corporation. Raycom agreed to affiliate its NBC stations' subchannels with NBC Weather Plus, a joint venture between the affiliates and the NBC station group. In August, Raycom sold a dozen of its stations to Barrington Broadcasting.

On November 12, 2007, Raycom announced its intention to acquire some of the television broadcasting properties of Lincoln National Corporation's Lincoln Financial Media for $583 million. Lincoln Financial Sports was merged into Raycom Sports later that year. The purchase of the stations were completed on April 2, 2008.

Around 2010, Raycom moved into producing its own programming. In September 2011, Raycom partnered with E.W. Scripps and Cox Media to produce Right This Minute. Also in 2011, the company partnered with ITV Studios America and launched America Now, a lifestyle-oriented news magazine. The magazine lasted until September 2014. In partnership with Bellum Entertainment Group in 2014, Flip My Food and Fix It and Finish It were launched as lead in strips to Raycom early newscasts. In the third quarter of 2014, Raycom purchased RTM Productions, based in Nashville and produces PowerNation branded auto-oriented shows for the Paramount Network, NBCSN, and CBS Sports Network.^{:2} Raycom acquired the assets of live and studio sports programming production company Tupelo-Honey Productions in January 2012.

In 2011, Raycom was an initial investor in Bounce TV, a broadcast subchannel network. Raycom News Network Digital Hub, an online news aggregator and exchange, was started in 2011 at the company's main office in Montgomery, Alabama. Raycom Media was an initial investor in Katz Broadcasting, launched in 2014 and a Bounce affiliated subchannel network group.

On November 20, 2013, Raycom entered into a shared services agreement to operate Louisiana Media Company's WVUE-TV in New Orleans.

On August 10, 2015, Raycom announced that it would purchase stations owned by Drewry Communications for $160 million. The sale was completed on December 1, 2015.

Raycom acquired Indianapolis-based sports production company WebStream Sports on September 14, 2015. WebStream was subsequently merged with existing Raycom entity Tupelo Honey to form Tupelo Raycom.

In October 2015, Raycom acquired Fox affiliate KNIN-TV for $14.5 million from E. W. Scripps Company; the FCC required that the station be divested during Scripps' acquisition of Journal Communications, but Scripps entered into shared services agreements with Raycom to continue operating KNIN.

Raycom purchased PureCars, a digital ad platform focused on automotive sales, for $125 million in November 2015.

On April 4, 2017, Raycom reached an agreement to acquire WVUE outright, and the sale was finalized on August 8.

In May 2017, Raycom purchased Calkins Media's WWSB and WTXL-TV. A sale of Calkins' WAAY-TV to Raycom affiliate American Spirit Media was blocked by the Department of Justice due to Raycom's ownership of WAFF-TV, and was instead sold to Heartland Media. The deal increased Raycom's reach to 16% of U.S. television households.

On September 25, 2017, Raycom announced that it would merge with Community Newspaper Holdings (CNHI), which was principally owned by Retirement Systems of Alabama. CNHI would continue to operate as a subsidiary of Raycom. To comply with FCC newspaper cross-ownership restrictions, Raycom divested newspapers in the seven markets where CNHI and Raycom both owned properties.

On June 14, 2018, Raycom announced the launch of InvestigateTV, an OTT app that showcased longer-form content from Raycom as well as content from ProPublica, News21 at Arizona State University's Cronkite School of Journalism, and NerdWallet.

On June 25, 2018, Gray Television announced its intent to acquire Raycom for $3.65 billion, pending regulatory approval. The combined company would be led by Raycom's current president and CEO Pat LaPlatney, with current Gray CEO Hilton Howell acting as executive chairman and co-CEO. The acquisition, which Gray expected to close in late 2018, would give Gray 142 stations in 92 markets, making Gray the third-largest owner of television stations in the United States, with a total market share of 24%. CNHI, which was sold separately, was not included in the sale to Gray. The sale was approved by the FCC on December 20. The deal was completed on January 2, 2019.

== Operations ==
Prior to its merger with Gray, Raycom owned and/or operated 65 television stations and two radio stations in 44 markets located in 20 states, covering over 16% of U.S. television households. Raycom also employed more than 4,800 individuals in full- and part-time positions.

=== Former stations ===
- Stations are arranged in alphabetical order by state and city of license.
- Two boldface asterisks appearing following a station's call letters (**) indicate a station built and signed on by Raycom Media.

Stations owned by Raycom Media
Media market	State/Territory	Station	Purchased	Sold	Notes
Birmingham	Alabama	WBRC	2009	2019	
Dothan	Alabama	WDFX-TV	2003	2019	
Huntsville	Alabama	WAFF	1996	2019	
Montgomery	Alabama	WSFA	2006	2019	
Jonesboro	Arkansas	KAIT	2006	2019	
Tucson	Arizona	KOLD-TV	1996	2019	
Tucson	Arizona	KMSB	2011	2019	(Note: Owned by Tegna Inc.)
Tucson	Arizona	KTTU	2011	2019	(Note: Owned by Tucker Operating Co., LLC.)
Colorado Springs	Colorado	KXRM-TV	2000	2006	
Colorado Springs	Colorado	KXTU-LD	1999	2006	
Panama City	Florida	WPGX	2003	2019	
Sarasota	Florida	WWSB	2017	2019	
Tallahassee	Florida	WTXL-TV	2017	2019	
West Palm Beach	Florida	WFLX	1998	2019	
Albany	Georgia	WFXL	2004	2006	
Albany	Georgia	WALB	2006	2019	
Augusta	Georgia	WFXG	2003	2019	
Columbus	Georgia	WTVM	1996	2019	
Columbus	Georgia	WXTX	2003	2019	(Note: Owned by American Spirit Media.)
Savannah	Georgia	WSAV-TV	1997	1997	
Savannah	Georgia	WTOC-TV	1996	2019	
Honolulu	Hawaii	KFVE	1999	2019	(Note: Owned by MCG Capital Corporation from 2009 to 2018.)
Honolulu	Hawaii	KGMB	2009	2019	
Honolulu	Hawaii	KHNL	1999	2019	
Hilo	Hawaii	KGMD-TV	1999	2019	(Note: Satellite of KFVE.)
Hilo	Hawaii	KHBC-TV	1999	2019	(Note: Satellite of KHNL.)
Wailuku–Maui	Hawaii	KGMV	1999	2019	
Wailuku–Maui	Hawaii	KOGG	1999	2019	
Boise	Idaho	KNIN-TV	2015	2019	
Evansville	Indiana	WFIE	2006	2019	
Waterloo–Cedar Rapids	Iowa	KWWL	1996	2006	
Louisville	Kentucky	WAVE	2006	2019	
Baton Rouge	Louisiana	WAFB	1996	2019	
Baton Rouge	Louisiana	WBXH-CD	2003	2019	
Lake Charles	Louisiana	KPLC	2006	2019	
Lake Charles	Louisiana	KVHP	2016	2019	
New Orleans	Louisiana	WVUE-DT	2013	2019	(Note: Owned by Louisiana Media Company from 2013 to 2017.)
Shreveport	Louisiana	KSLA	1996	2019	
Marquette–Escanaba	Michigan	WLUC-TV	1997	2006	
Sault Ste. Marie	Michigan	WTOM-TV	1997	2006	(Note: Satellite of WPBN-TV.)
Traverse City	Michigan	WPBN-TV	1997	2006	
Biloxi–Gulfport–Pascagoula	Mississippi	WLOX	2006	2019	
Jackson	Mississippi	WJTV	1996	1997	
Jackson	Mississippi	WLBT	2006	2019	
Jackson	Mississippi	WLOO	2012	2019	(Note: Operated by American Spirit Media with Raycom providing limited engineering support.)
Jackson	Mississippi	WDBD	2012	2019	
Hattiesburg–Laurel	Mississippi	WHLT	1996	1997	(Note: Semi-satellite of WJTV.)
Hattiesburg–Laurel	Mississippi	WDAM-TV	1997	2019	
Cape Girardeau	Missouri	KFVS-TV	1996	2019	
Cape Girardeau	Missouri	WQTV-LP	2002	2019	
Cape Girardeau	Missouri	WQWQ-LP	2002	2019	
Kirksville	Missouri	KTVO	1997	2006	
Kirksville	Missouri	KYOU-TV	2003	2019	
Reno	Nevada	KAME-TV	1996	1997	
Albuquerque–Santa Fe	New Mexico	KASA-TV	1999	2007	
Syracuse	New York	WSTM-TV	1997	2006	
Syracuse	New York	WSTQ-LP	2003	2006	
Charlotte	North Carolina	WBTV	2008	2019	
Washington–Greenville–New Bern	North Carolina	WITN-TV	1997	1997	
Wilmington	North Carolina	WECT	1996	2019	
Wilmington	North Carolina	WSFX-TV	2004	2019	
Wilmington	North Carolina	WWAY	2006	2006	
Cincinnati	Ohio	WXIX-TV	1998	2019	
Cleveland	Ohio	WOIO	1998	2019	
Cleveland	Ohio	WUAB	2000	2019	
Toledo	Ohio	WNWO-TV	1998	2006	
Toledo	Ohio	WTOL	2006	2019	
Toledo	Ohio	WUPW	1996	1999	
Toledo	Ohio	WUPW	2012	2019	
Lawton	Oklahoma	KSWO-TV	2015	2019	
Charleston	South Carolina	WCSC-TV	2008	2019	
Columbia	South Carolina	WACH	1996	2006	
Columbia	South Carolina	WIS	2006	2019	
Myrtle Beach–Florence	South Carolina	WMBF-TV **	2008	2019	
Aberdeen	South Dakota	KABY-TV	1997	2004	(Note: Satellite of KSFY-TV.)
Pierre	South Dakota	KPRY-TV	1997	2004	
Sioux Falls	South Dakota	KSFY-TV	1997	2004	
Knoxville	Tennessee	WTNZ	1996	2019	
Memphis	Tennessee	WMC	1996	2000	
Memphis	Tennessee	WMC-FM	1996	2000	
Memphis	Tennessee	WMC-TV	1996	2019	
Amarillo	Texas	KEYU	2015	2019	
Amarillo	Texas	KEYU-FM	2015	2018	
Amarillo	Texas	KFDA-TV	2015	2019	
Amarillo	Texas	KZBZ-CD	2015	2019	
Harlingen–McAllen–Brownsville	Texas	KGBT-TV	2006	2006	
Lubbock	Texas	KCBD	2006	2019	
Midland–Odessa	Texas	KTLE-LP	2015	2019	
Midland–Odessa	Texas	KTXC	2015	2018	
Midland–Odessa	Texas	KWAB-TV	2015	2019	(Note: Satellite of KWES-TV.)
Midland–Odessa	Texas	KWES-TV	2015	2019	
Tyler–Longview–Jacksonville	Texas	KLTV	2006	2019	
Lufkin–Nacogdoches	Texas	KTRE	2006	2019	(Note: Semi-satellite of KLTV.)
Waco–Temple–Bryan	Texas	KRHD-CD	2015	2019	(Note: Semi-satellite of KXXV.)
Waco–Temple–Bryan	Texas	KSCM-LP	2015	2017	
Waco–Temple–Bryan	Texas	KXXV	2015	2019	
Wichita Falls	Texas	KAUZ-TV	2015	2019	
Richmond	Virginia	WTVR-TV	1997	2009	
Richmond	Virginia	WWBT	2008	2019	
Richmond	Virginia	WUPV	2006	2019	
Richland–Pasco–Kennewick	Washington	KNDU	1997	1999	(Note: Satellite of KNDO.)
Yakima	Washington	KNDO	1997	1999	
Ponce	Puerto Rico	WSUR-DT	1996	2005	(Note: Satellite of WLII-DT.) (Note: Operated by Univision from 2002 to 2005. WORA-TV in Mayagüez, owned by a third party, functioned as a semi-satellite.)
San Juan	Puerto Rico	WLII-DT	1996	2005	

=== Other assets ===
In addition to television stations, Raycom also owned:

- Bounce TV (investment)
- Broadview Media
- Community Newspaper Holdings, Inc.
- Frankly (20%)
  - WorldNow
- Katz Broadcasting (investment)
- Pure Cars
- Raycom Sports
- RTM Productions
  - PowerNation (automotive hobby programming for the Paramount Network, CBS Sports Network and NBCSN)

==== Tupelo Raycom ====
Tupelo Raycom is Raycom Media's production company formed from the merger of Tupelo Honey Productions and WebStream Sports. Clients of the company include NBC, CBS, ESPN, Turner Sports, Fox, Travel Channel, Bounce TV and Live Nation.

Raycom acquired the assets of live and studio sports programming production company Tupelo-Honey Productions in January 2012. Tupelo Honey assets included a 50% share of MY Tupelo Entertainment, a joint venture form in 2009 as partnership between Cary Glotzer's Tupelo-Honey and Michael Yudin's MY-Entertainment Company. Yudin bought back Raycom's half of My Tupelo in March 2014.

Raycom acquired Indianapolis, Indiana-based sports production company WebStream Sports on September 14, 2015. WebStream was subsequently merged with existing Raycom entity Tupelo Honey to form Tupelo Raycom in January 2016.
