= Channel 10 virtual TV stations in the United States =

The following television stations operate on virtual channel 10 in the United States:

- K02NV-D in Sargents, Colorado
- K03AY-D in Ridgway, etc., Colorado
- K04JZ-D in Gold Hill, Oregon
- K04MG-D in Wedderburn, etc., Oregon
- K04QX-D in Townsend, Montana
- K06HZ-D in Paonia, Colorado
- K06KA-D in Fort Jones, etc., California
- K06PG-D in Laughlin, Nevada
- K07GI-D in Prospect, Oregon
- K07OJ-D in Snowflake, Arizona
- K07YJ-D in Bullhead City, Arizona
- K08LG-D in Silver Lake, etc., Oregon
- K08PE-D in Alamo, etc., Nevada
- K08PG-D in Indian Springs, Nevada
- K09VC-D in Paisley, Oregon
- K10BA-D in Orondo, etc., Washington
- K10KG-D in Tenakee Springs, Alaska
- K10KH-D in Shageluk, Alaska
- K10KM-D in Cape Girardeau, Missouri
- K10LJ-D in Galena, Alaska
- K10LU-D in Nightmute, Alaska
- K10MZ-D in Dolores, Colorado
- K10NY-D in Ismay Canyon, Colorado
- K10OD-D in Weber Canyon, Colorado
- K10OG-D in Lompoc, California
- K10PM-D in Breckenridge, Colorado
- K10QL-D in Abilene, Texas
- K10QX-D in Reno, Nevada
- K10RS-D in Aspen, Colorado
- K10RT-D in Beaumont, Texas
- K10RU-D in Salinas, California
- K12LS-D in Challis, Idaho
- K12MS-D in Elko, Nevada
- K12PT-D in Ryndon, Nevada
- K13ML-D in Hotchkiss, etc., Colorado
- K13NQ-D in Ruth, Nevada
- K13NR-D in Ely & McGill, Nevada
- K13QE-D in Driggs, Idaho
- K13QH-D in Swan Valley/Irwin, Idaho
- K14AL-D in Ely, Nevada
- K14IJ-D in Leadore, Idaho
- K14MC-D in Lava Hot Springs, Idaho
- K14QH-D in Butte Falls, Oregon
- K14TH-D in Williams, Oregon
- K15GO-D in Georgetown, Idaho
- K15HR-D in Mackay, Idaho
- K15HU-D in Lakeview, Oregon
- K15JZ-D in Applegate Valley, Oregon
- K15KE-D in Klamath Falls, etc., Oregon
- K15KL-D in Jacksonville, Oregon
- K15KN-D in Roseburg, Oregon
- K16BZ-D in Ruidoso, New Mexico
- K17BN-D in Needles, California
- K17GK-D in Arlington, Oregon
- K17II-D in Logan, Utah
- K17NS-D in Chloride, Arizona
- K18IZ-D in Grandfield, Oklahoma
- K18LJ-D in Dunsmuir, etc., California
- K18LU-D in Glendale, etc., Oregon
- K18MD-D in Childress, Texas
- K19BK-D in Lakeview, Oregon
- K19CY-D in Rockland, Idaho
- K19HH-D in Midland, etc., Oregon
- K19JW-D in Mauna Loa, Hawaii
- K20KT-D in Dora, New Mexico
- K20MQ-D in Rexburg, Idaho
- K21JI-D in Cave Junction, etc., Oregon
- K21NW-D in Tulia, Texas
- K22ND-D in Willmar, Minnesota
- K22NK-D in Lake Havasu City, Arizona
- K22NV-D in Malad City, Idaho
- K22OQ-D in Fort Jones, etc., California
- K23BV-D in Montpelier, Idaho
- K23DO-D in Malta, Idaho
- K23DX-D in Pitkin, Colorado
- K23FP-D in Olivia, Minnesota
- K23GK-D in Astoria, Oregon
- K24FH-D in Glide, etc., Oregon
- K24GE-D in Wells, Nevada
- K24MW-D in Clovis, New Mexico
- K25GM-D in Newport, Nebraska
- K25JW-D in Hugo, etc., Oregon
- K25LU-D in Mesquite, Nevada
- K25OM-D in Prescott, Arizona
- K25PO-D in Holbrook, Idaho
- K26FQ-D in John Day, Oregon
- K26HY-D in Ely, Nevada
- K26JR-D in Turkey, Texas
- K26KQ-D in Christmas Valley, Oregon
- K26NG-D in East Flagstaff, Arizona
- K26OJ-D in Tucumcari, New Mexico
- K27EJ-D in Colorado City, Arizona
- K27GM-D in Preston, Idaho
- K27JK-D in Glendale, Nevada
- K27KN-D in Alexandria, Minnesota
- K27OH-D in Lund & Preston, Nevada
- K28CS-D in Pahrump, Nevada
- K28GD-D in Heppner, etc., Oregon
- K28IH-D in Rainier, Oregon
- K28JM-D in Waimea, Hawaii
- K28JV-D in Hilo, Hawaii
- K28LO-D in Paisley, Oregon
- K28NO-D in Rogue River, Oregon
- K28PZ-D in Parlin, Colorado
- K29HB-D in Clovis, New Mexico
- K29JN-D in Gold Beach, Oregon
- K29LL-D in Phoenix/Talent, Oregon
- K29LO-D in Kingman, Arizona
- K29LY-D in Salmon, Idaho
- K29MD-D in O'Neill, Nebraska
- K29OE-D in Rochester, Minnesota
- K30JS-D in Yreka, California
- K30RA-D in Racine, Minnesota
- K31EA-D in Littlefield, Arizona
- K31HZ-D in The Dalles, etc., Oregon
- K31IR-D in Grays River, Washington
- K31IZ-D in Naalehu, Hawaii
- K31NE-D in Williams, Arizona
- K31PT-D in Soda Springs, Idaho
- K32DW-D in Chloride, Arizona
- K32EH-D in Memphis, Texas
- K32GD-D in Guymon, Oklahoma
- K32OB-D in Panaca, Nevada
- K32OE-D in Alamogordo, New Mexico
- K33FF-D in Wallace, etc., Nebraska
- K33KE-D in Sargents, Colorado
- K33OW-D in Neligh, Nebraska
- K33PX-D in Clarendon, Texas
- K34LI-D in Jean, Nevada
- K34LS-D in Seneca, Oregon
- K34NQ-D in Memphis, Texas
- K34QC-D in Lewiston, Idaho
- K35II-D in South Point, Hawaii
- K36AE-D in Clarkdale, Arizona
- K36BA-D in Burns, Oregon
- K36FG-D in Hood River, etc., Oregon
- K36GU-D in Rockaway Beach, Oregon
- K36OF-D in Ursine, Nevada
- K36OZ-D in Hakalau, Hawaii
- K36PE-D in Peach Springs, Arizona
- K36PU-D in Pioche, Nevada
- K36PX-D in Caliente, Nevada
- KAKE in Wichita, Kansas
- KBIM-TV in Roswell, New Mexico
- KBRR in Thief River Falls, Minnesota
- KBSL-DT in Goodland, Kansas
- KENV-DT in Elko, Nevada
- KFDA-TV in Amarillo, Texas
- KFNE in Riverton, Wyoming
- KGBY-LD in Palm Springs, California
- KGTV in San Diego, California
- KIIO-LD in Los Angeles, California
- KISU-TV in Pocatello, Idaho
- KLFY-TV in Lafayette, Louisiana
- KLVX in Las Vegas, Nevada
- KMCA-LD in Redding, California
- KMEB in Wailuku, Hawaii
- KMOT in Minot, North Dakota
- KNPL-LD in North Platte, Nebraska
- KOLN in Lincoln, Nebraska
- KOLR in Springfield, Missouri
- KOPB-TV in Portland, Oregon
- KQAH-LD in Maltby, Washington
- KQME in Lead, South Dakota
- KREY-TV in Montrose, Colorado
- KSAZ-TV in Phoenix, Arizona
- KSBS-CD in Denver, Colorado
- KSTF in Scottsbluff, Nebraska
- KTEN in Ada, Oklahoma
- KTSD-TV in Pierre, South Dakota
- KTTC in Rochester, Minnesota
- KTVE in El Dorado, Arkansas
- KTVL in Medford, Oregon
- KUHM-TV in Helena, Montana
- KULU-LD in Park City, Utah
- KULX-CD in Ogden, Utah
- KUVM-LD in Houston, Texas
- KWCM-TV in Appleton, Minnesota
- KWSU-TV in Pullman, Washington
- KWTX-TV in Waco, Texas
- KXNU-LD in Laredo, Texas
- KXTV in Sacramento, California
- KZSD-LP in San Diego, California
- KZTV in Corpus Christi, Texas
- W03AM-D in Harrison, Maine
- W04BS-D in Bethel, Maine
- W05DD-D in St. Francis, Maine
- W10DG-D in Evansville, Indiana
- W14DY-D in Onancock, Virginia
- W30ER-D in Wilmington, North Carolina
- W34FC-D in La Crosse, Wisconsin
- WALA-TV in Mobile, Alabama
- WALB in Albany, Georgia
- WAVY-TV in Portsmouth, Virginia
- WBIQ in Birmingham, Alabama
- WBIR-TV in Knoxville, Tennessee
- WBNS-TV in Columbus, Ohio
- WBUP in Ishpeming, Michigan
- WCAU in Philadelphia, Pennsylvania
- WCBB in Augusta, Maine
- WDCO-CD in Woodstock, Virginia
- WDIO-DT in Duluth, Minnesota
- WFSF-LD in Key West, Florida
- WGEM-TV in Quincy, Illinois
- WGOM-LD in Panama City, Florida
- WHEC-TV in Rochester, New York
- WILM-LD in Wilmington, North Carolina
- WILX-TV in Onondaga, Michigan
- WIS in Columbia, South Carolina
- WJAR in Providence, Rhode Island
- WJXE-LD in Gainesville, Florida
- WKNO in Memphis, Tennessee
- WMEM-TV in Presque Isle, Maine
- WMVS in Milwaukee, Wisconsin
- WPLG in Miami, Florida
- WRUF-LD in Gainesville, Florida
- WSLS-TV in Roanoke, Virginia
- WSWF-LD in Orlando, Florida
- WTAJ-TV in Altoona, Pennsylvania
- WTEN in Albany, New York
- WTHI-TV in Terre Haute, Indiana
- WTSG-LD in Tifton, Georgia
- WTSP in St. Petersburg, Florida
- WVFX in Clarksburg, West Virginia
- WWCI-CD in Vero Beach, Florida
- WWUP-TV in Sault Ste. Marie, Michigan
- WYGN-LD in Berrien Springs, Michigan

The following stations, which are no longer licensed, formerly broadcast on virtual channel 10:

- K10LD-D in Dillingham, Alaska
- K10PL-D in Victoria, Texas
- K22JD-D in Madera Peak, Arizona
- K33CF-D in Wellington, Texas
- K33OS-D in Granite Falls, Minnesota
- K35CE-D in Canadian, Texas
- K36MA-D in Perryton, Texas
- K38KZ-D in Bovina, etc., Texas
- K38LK-D in Jacks Cabin, Colorado
- K41JT-D in Kilauea Military Camp, Hawaii
- K43ED-D in New Mobeetie, Texas
- K44CC-D in Gruver, Texas
- K46BY-D in Capulin, etc., New Mexico
- K48GI-D in Flagstaff, Arizona
- KBNB-LD in San Antonio, Texas
- KFAK-LD in Boise, Idaho
- KNEE-LD in Malaga, etc., Washington
- KRDJ-LD in Lubbock, Texas
