= KEYU (TV) =

Television station in Borger, Texas

- Borger–Amarillo, Texas; United States
- City: Borger, Texas
- Channels: Digital: 31 (UHF); Virtual: 31
- Branding: Telemundo Amarillo (general); Noticiero Telemundo Amarillo (news)

Programming
- Affiliations: 31.1: Telemundo; for others, see § Subchannels

Ownership
- Owner: Gray Media; (Gray Television Licensee, LLC)
- Sister stations: KFDA-TV

History
- Founded: February 6, 1998
- First air date: November 2, 2004
- Former channel numbers: Analog: 31 (UHF, 2004–2009); Translators: KEYU-LP 41 Amarillo; KEAT-LP 22 Amarillo
- Former affiliations: Univision (2004–2010)
- Call sign meaning: Equity Univision (original owner and affiliation)

Technical information
- Licensing authority: FCC
- Facility ID: 83715
- ERP: 700 kW
- HAAT: 305 m (1,001 ft)
- Transmitter coordinates: 35°20′33.1″N 101°49′21.2″W
- Translator(s): KFDA-DT 10.3 (VHF) Amarillo

Links
- Public license information: Public file; LMS
- Website: www.telemundoamarillo.com

KEYU (channel 31) is a television station licensed to Borger, Texas, United States, serving the Amarillo area as an affiliate of the Spanish-language network Telemundo. It is owned by Gray Media alongside CBS affiliate KFDA-TV (channel 10). The two stations share studios on Broadway Drive (just south of West Cherry Avenue) in northern Amarillo; KEYU's transmitter is located on Dumas Drive (US 87-287) and Reclamation Plant Road in rural unincorporated Potter County.

Despite its full-power status, the station's broadcasting radius does not reach the entire Amarillo market (covering a 55.2-mile-wide [88.8 km] area, compared to KFDA's 75.2-mile-wide [121.0 km] signal contour). To reach portions of the Texas Panhandle that do not receive KEYU's signal adequately, if at all, KEYU is simulcast in 480i widescreen standard definition on KFDA's third subchannel (10.3) from a separate transmitter at the KEYU/KFDA studios.

== History ==
The station first signed on the air on November 2, 2004; it was founded and owned by Little Rock–based Equity Broadcasting Corporation (later Equity Media Holdings). KEYU originally operated as an affiliate of Univision, becoming the first Amarillo television station to have affiliated with the Spanish-language network. The station originally broadcast from studio facilities located on South Kentucky Street (behind I-40) on Amarillo's southwest side. Prior to the station's sign-on, Univision had previously been only receivable via local cable providers within the state (such as Cox Communications in Amarillo and Canyon), which carried the Spanish language network's programming via its national feed; that feed was eventually replaced by a direct fiber optic feed of KEYU—whose schedule mirrored the national feed outside of local advertising, news inserts and occasional paid programming substitutions—from the station's studios.

On June 25, 2008, Equity announced that it would sell KEYU and its low-power repeaters—along with Univision affiliates KUOK in Woodward, Oklahoma (and its Oklahoma City and Sulphur translators), KUTW-LP/KWKO-LP in Waco, Texas, WLZE-LP/WEVU-CA in Fort Myers, Florida; and WUMN-CA in Minneapolis–Saint Paul—to Luken Communications (owned by former Equity executive Henry Luken) for $25 million, with a contingency to reduce the sale price to $17.5 million if Luken closed its purchase on all of the stations simultaneously. That December, Equity Media Holdings filed for Chapter 11 bankruptcy protection; offers by Luken Communications to acquire Equity-owned stations in six markets were later withdrawn. According to the Retro Television Network website, KEYU had at one point planned to add an RTN affiliate on DT3 sometime in the future. However, after Equity filed for Chapter 11 bankruptcy in December 2008, Luken began to distance itself from Equity; its offers to acquire KEYU and other Equity stations were eventually withdrawn, and on January 4, 2009, RTN affiliation was removed from all Equity-owned or operated stations as a result of a commercial dispute with Luken.

Station ID, used from 2004 to 2007.

Former KEYU logo, used from 2007 to 2009.

In 2009, KEYU and three Amarillo LPTV stations—Telefutura affiliate KAMT-LP and KEYU repeaters KEYU-LP and KEAT-LP—were put up for sale for $7.5 million, as part of a sell-off of all of Equity's stations. A buyer was not found until October, when Drewry Communications announced that it would purchase the stations, with a failing station waiver being obtained to allow KEYU to be co-owned with KFDA. The station subsequently relocated its operations to KFDA's studios on Broadway Drive in northern Amarillo. (The former KEYU studio building is now occupied by the Mewbourne Oil Company.) Shortly after assuming control in 2010, Drewry dropped the station's affiliation with Univision and moved the programming of KTMO-LP, including its Telemundo affiliation and local newscasts, to KEYU.

On August 10, 2015, Montgomery, Alabama–based Raycom Media announced that it would purchase Drewry Communications' eight television stations as well as radio stations KEYU-FM (102.9 FM) in Amarillo and KTXC in Lamesa for $160 million. The sale was completed on December 1; as a result, KEYU became the first full-power Spanish-language television station to be owned by Raycom. (The remainder of the group's Telemundo-affiliated stations were low-power or subchannel-only outlets.)

On June 25, 2018, Atlanta-based Gray Television announced it had reached an agreement with Raycom to merge their respective broadcasting assets (consisting of Raycom's 63 existing owned-and/or-operated television stations, including KFDA-TV and KEYU as well as Lubbock sister station KCBD, and Gray's 93 television stations) under the former's corporate umbrella. The cash-and-stock merger transaction valued at $3.6 billion—in which Gray shareholders would acquire preferred stock currently held by Raycom—resulted in KFDA/KEYU gaining a new sister station in the Odessa–Midland market as Gray plans to retain ownership of fellow CBS affiliate KOSA-TV in exchange for selling NBC affiliate KWES-TV (which was sold to an independent company to comply with FCC ownership rules prohibiting common ownership of two of the four highest-rated stations in a single market, instead KWES and WTOL in Toledo, Ohio, would be sold to Tegna Inc.). The sale was approved on December 20, and was completed on January 2, 2019.

In August 2018, the station dropped LATV programming on its second digital subchannel and opened a third subchannel affiliating with Ion Television, returning the network's programming to the Amarillo market after low-power station K39HF ceased operations in 2014.

== Newscasts ==
From 2005 until May 2008, Equity Broadcasting produced Spanish-language newscasts for KEYU, titled Noticias Univision Amarillo. The twice-nightly newscasts—which aired at 5 and 10 p.m. each weeknight—consisted of a single broadcast that was repeated later in the evening. While KEYU maintained its own locally based full-time reporters and photographers at its Amarillo facility, most of the newscast segments were produced out of studios located at Equity's headquarters in Little Rock, which served as a production hub for local newscasts aired by the group's Univision-affiliated stations. As with Equity's Univision newscasts elsewhere, the program consisted of nine minutes of local news and weather segments, accompanied by pre-recorded national and international news and sports segments produced for inclusion in all of the broadcasts. As a result of corporate cutbacks spurred by the company's financial issues, Equity discontinued the newscasts it produced for all six of its Univision affiliates (including KEYU) on June 6, 2008.

After becoming a sister station to KFDA-TV, KEYU restored full-scale news programming to its schedule in September 2009; the station assumed production responsibilities for its newscasts, launching weeknight-only newscasts at 5 and 10 p.m. produced at the Broadway Drive studios.

KEYU began airing a statewide morning newscast, Noticias Telemundo Texas, on October 10, 2022. The program was presented from KXTX-TV in Fort Worth. On November 1, 2024, Noticias Telemundo Texas was discontinued.

== Technical information ==
=== Subchannels ===
The station's signal is multiplexed:

Subchannels of KEYU
Channel	Res.	Short name	Programming
31.1	1080i	KEYU	Telemundo
31.2	480i	Heroes	Heroes & Icons
31.3	480i	Outlaw	Outlaw
31.4	480i	ION	Ion
31.5	480i	WEST	WEST
31.6	480i	StartTV	Start TV
31.7	480i	DEFY	Ion Plus

=== Analog-to-digital transition ===
As the station's original construction permit was granted after the Federal Communications Commission (FCC) finalized the DTV allotment plan on April 21, 1997, the station did not receive a companion channel for its digital signal. Instead, at the end of the digital conversion period for full-service television stations, KEYU would have been required to turn off its analog signal and turn on its digital signal (called a "flash-cut").

As a result of then-KEYU-owner Equity Media Holdings filing a bankruptcy relief petition under Chapter 11 of the federal bankruptcy code on December 8, 2008, the station was required to obtain post-petition financing and court approval before digital facilities were to be constructed, and had to cease its analog signal on February 17, 2009, regardless of whether digital facilities were operational by that date. The station filed an authority to remain silent if required by the FCC. While the DTV Delay Act extended this deadline to June 12, 2009, Equity had applied for an extension of the digital construction permit in order to retain the broadcast license after the station went dark. In 2011, the main KEYU signal was later added as a digital subchannel of CBS-affiliated sister station KFDA-TV for viewers in Amarillo with an over-the-air digital receiver.
