= List of Telemundo affiliates (table) =

Telemundo logo

The following is a list of affiliates for Telemundo, an American television network owned by NBCUniversal.

== Affiliates ==
Two boldface asterisks (**) indicate an original owned-and-operated station either from the network's 1984 inception as NetSpan or their 1987 relaunch as Telemundo.

List of Telemundo affiliates and owned-stations
Media market	State/Dist./Terr.	Station	Channel	Year affiliated	Owner	Notes
Birmingham	Alabama	WTBM-CD	24	2022	Gray Media	
Huntsville	Alabama	WTHV-LD	29	2022	Gray Media	
Mobile	Alabama	WMBP-LD	31	2022	Gray Media	
Montgomery	Alabama	WBXM-CD	15	2022	Gray Media	
Phoenix	Arizona	KTAZ	39	2001	Telemundo Station Group	
Tucson	Arizona	KHRR	40	1992	Telemundo Station Group	
Yuma	Arizona	KECY-TV	9.4	2009	News-Press & Gazette Company	(Note: Simulcast of KESE-LD.)
Yuma	Arizona	KESE-LD	35	1997	News-Press & Gazette Company	
Fayetteville	Arkansas	KEGW-CD	33	2014	Pinnacle Media	
Jonesboro	Arkansas	KJTB-LD	36	2022	Gray Media	
Little Rock	Arkansas	KKYK-CD	30	2020	Pinnacle Media	
Bakersfield	California	KGET-TV	17.3	2007	Nexstar Media Group	(Note: Simulcast of KKEY-LD.)
Bakersfield	California	KKEY-LD	13	2003	Nexstar Media Group	
Chico–Redding–Eureka	California	KNVN	24.2	2014	K4 Media Holdings, LLC	
Fresno	California	KNSO	51	2000	Telemundo Station Group	
Los Angeles	California	KVEA **	52	1985	Telemundo Station Group	
Palm Desert	California	KESQ-TV	42.7	2008	News-Press & Gazette Company	
Palm Desert	California	KUNA-LD	15	1996	News-Press & Gazette Company	
Sacramento	California	KCSO-LD	33	1999	Telemundo Station Group	
Sacramento	California	KMUM-CD	33	2014	Telemundo Station Group	
Sacramento	California	KMAX-TV	31.7	2022	CBS News and Stations	(Note: Standard definition simulcast of KCSO-LD.)
Salinas–Monterey	California	KMUV-LD	23	1996	News-Press & Gazette Company	
San Diego	California	KUAN-LD	48	2017	Telemundo Station Group	
San Francisco	California	KSTS **	48	1984	Telemundo Station Group	
Santa Barbara	California	KCOY-TV	12	2023	News-Press & Gazette Company	
Colorado Springs–Pueblo	Colorado	KTLO-LD	46	2004	News-Press & Gazette Company	
Colorado Springs–Pueblo	Colorado	KRDO-TV	13.2	2009	News-Press & Gazette Company	(Note: Simulcast of KTLO-LD.)
Denver	Colorado	KDEN-TV	25	2006	Telemundo Station Group	
Grand Junction	Colorado	KKCO	11.3	2008	Gray Media	
Hartford–New Britain	Connecticut	WRDM-CD	19	1995	Telemundo Station Group	
Washington	District of Columbia	WZDC-CD	44	1993	Telemundo Station Group	
Fort Myers	Florida	WWDT-CD	43	2000	Telemundo Station Group	
Gainesville	Florida	WTGB-LD	34	2024	Gray Media	
Jacksonville	Florida	WFOX-TV	30.4	2022	Cox Media Group	
Miami–Fort Lauderdale	Florida	WSCV **	51	1987	Telemundo Station Group	
Orlando	Florida	WTMO-CD	31	1992	Telemundo Station Group	
Tampa-St. Petersburg	Florida	WRMD-CD	49	1989	Telemundo Station Group	
Atlanta	Georgia	WKTB-CD	47	2000	Gray Media	
Columbus	Georgia	WGAT-LD	17	2022	Gray Media	
Kailua-Kona	Hawaii	KFVE	6	2017	Gray Media	
Boise	Idaho	KKJB	39	2005	Cocola Broadcasting	
Idaho Falls	Idaho	KIFI-TV	8.5	2008	News-Press & Gazette Company	
Chicago	Illinois	WSNS-TV	44	1989	Telemundo Station Group	
Rockford	Illinois	WFBN-LD	35.2	2012	Weigel Broadcasting	(Note: Simulcast of WYTU-LD.)
Evansville	Indiana	WYYW-CD	15	2015	Evansville Low Power Partnership	
Indianapolis	Indiana	WDNI-CD	19	2013	Radio One	
South Bend	Indiana	WMYS-LD	69.2	2012	Weigel Broadcasting	
Garden City	Kansas	KSNG	11.2	2010	Nexstar Media Group	(Note: Satellite of KSNW.)
Wichita	Kansas	KSNW	3.2	2010	Nexstar Media Group	
Bowling Green	Kentucky	WBGS-LD	34	2022	Gray Media	
Paducah	Kentucky	WQWQ-LD	18	2023	Gray Media	
Baton Rouge	Louisiana	WLFT-CD	30.2	2021	Red Stick Broadcasting	(Note: Simulcast of KGLA-DT.)
Lafayette	Louisiana	KLWB	50.3	2020	Delta Media	
Lake Charles	Louisiana	KWWE-LD	19.3	2019	SagamoreHill Broadcasting	
New Orleans	Louisiana	KGLA-DT	42	2007	Mayavision, Inc.	(Note: Simulcasted on WLFT 30.2.)
Shreveport	Louisiana	KTSH-CD	19	2022	Gray Media	
Salisbury	Maryland	WBOC-LD	42	2017	Draper Holdings	
Salisbury	Maryland	WSJZ-LD	42.3	2019	Draper Holdings	(Note: Simulcast of WBOC-LD.)
Boston	Massachusetts	WNEU	60	2002	Telemundo Station Group	
Springfield	Massachusetts	WDMR-LD	14	1995	Telemundo Station Group	
Minneapolis	Minnesota	KJNK-LD	25	2014	Innovate Corp.	
Kansas City	Missouri	KGKC-LD	39	2018	SagamoreHill Broadcasting	
St. Joseph	Missouri	KNPG-LD	21.3	2017	News-Press & Gazette Company	
St. Louis	Missouri	WODK-LD	45	2023	Innovate Corp.	
Columbus	Nebraska	KMJF-LD	48.2	2017	Flood Communications LLC	
Grand Island	Nebraska	KMLF-LD	21.2	2018	Flood Communications LLC	
Hastings	Nebraska	KGHK-LD	30.2	2018	Flood Communications LLC	
Lincoln	Nebraska	KFDY-LD	27	2017	Flood Communications LLC	
Omaha	Nebraska	KOHA-LD	27	2018	Flood Communications LLC	
South Sioux City	Nebraska	KBWF-LD	15.2	2018	Flood Communications LLC	
Las Vegas	Nevada	KBLR	39	1989	Telemundo Station Group	
Santa Fe–Albuquerque	New Mexico	KASA-TV	2	2017	Telemundo Station Group	
New York City	New York	WNJU **	47	1984	Telemundo Station Group	
Charlotte	North Carolina	WSOC-TV	9.2	2017	Cox Media Group	
Hendersonville	North Carolina	WDKT-LD	31	2024	Gray Media	
Raleigh–Durham	North Carolina	WRTD-CD	54	2018	Telemundo Station Group	
Wilmington	North Carolina	WTWL-LD	31	2022	Gray Media	
Cincinnati	Ohio	WBQC-LD	25	2023	Gray Media	
Cleveland	Ohio	WTCL-LD	6	2022	Gray Media	
Columbus	Ohio	WQMC-LD	23.3	2019	Urban One	
Dayton	Ohio	WZCD-LD	32.2	2026	Gray Media	
Lawton	Oklahoma	KSWO-TV	7.2	2009	Gray Media	
Oklahoma City	Oklahoma	KTUZ-TV	30	2005	Tyler Media Group	
Tulsa	Oklahoma	KUTU-CD	25.3	2015	Tyler Media Group	(Note: Moved from 25.2 in 2023 by UniMás.)
Bend	Oregon	KQRE-LD	20	2007	News-Press & Gazette Company	
Bend	Oregon	KFXO-CD	39.2	2012	News-Press & Gazette Company	
Portland	Oregon	KJWY-LD	21	2022	SagamoreHill Broadcasting	
Salem	Oregon	KJYY-LD	29	2022	SagamoreHill Broadcasting	
Philadelphia	Pennsylvania	WWSI	62	2001	Telemundo Station Group	
Mayagüez	Puerto Rico	WNJX-TV	2.12	2020	Hemisphere Media Group	(Note: Satellite of WKAQ-TV, San Juan.)
Ponce	Puerto Rico	WTIN-TV	2.11	2020	Hemisphere Media Group	
San Juan	Puerto Rico	WKAQ-TV **	2	1954	Telemundo Station Group	
Providence	Rhode Island	WRIW-CD	51	2000	Telemundo Station Group	
Providence	Rhode Island	WYCN-LD	8	2019	Telemundo Station Group	
Columbia	South Carolina	WKTC	63.2	2009	WBHQ Columbia LLC	
Myrtle Beach	South Carolina	WXIV-LD	14	2022	Gray Media	
Knoxville	Tennessee	WBXX-TV	20.5	2022	Gray Media	
Memphis	Tennessee	WTME-LD	14	2024	Gray Media	
Nashville	Tennessee	WTNX-LD	29	2022	Gray Media	
Abilene	Texas	KTAB-TV	32.2	2009	Nexstar Media Group	
Amarillo	Texas	KEYU	31	2010	Gray Media	
Amarillo	Texas	KFDA-TV	10.3	2008	Gray Media	(Note: Simulcast of KEYU.)
Austin	Texas	KEYE-TV	42.2	2009	Sinclair Broadcast Group	
Beaumont - Port Arthur	Texas	KGEW-LD	33.1	2018	SagamoreHill Broadcasting	
Big Spring	Texas	KCWO-TV	4.2	2019	Gray Media	(Note: Simulcast of KTLE-LD.)
Dallas–Fort Worth	Texas	KXTX-TV	39	2001	Telemundo Station Group	
El Paso	Texas	KTDO	48	1999	Telemundo Station Group	
Houston	Texas	KTMD **	47	1988	Telemundo Station Group	
Laredo	Texas	KXNU-LD	10	2020	Gray Media	
Lubbock	Texas	KXTQ-CD	46	1990	Gray Media	
Odessa–Midland	Texas	KOSA-TV	7.3	2019	Gray Media	
Odessa–Midland	Texas	KTLE-LD	20	1992	Gray Media	(Note: Owned by Telemundo from 1989 to 2001.)
Rio Grande City	Texas	KTLM	40	1999	Telemundo Station Group	
San Antonio	Texas	KVDA **	60	1989	Telemundo Station Group	
Sherman	Texas	KAQI-LD	28	2022	Gray Media	
Tyler–Longview	Texas	KLTV	7.3	2010	Gray Media	
Victoria	Texas	KVTX-LD	45	2000	Morgan Murphy Media	
Waco	Texas	KWTX-TV	10.2	2019	Gray Media	
Salt Lake City	Utah	KEJT-CD	50	1993	Telemundo Station Group	
Salt Lake City	Utah	KTMW	20	2015	Telemundo Station Group	
Salt Lake City	Utah	KULX-CD	10	2014	Telemundo Station Group	
Richmond	Virginia	WZTD-LD	45	2007	Telemundo Station Group	
Kennewick	Washington	KFFX-TV	11.2	2016	Rincon Broadcasting Group	
Seattle–Tacoma	Washington	KIRO-TV	7.4	2022	Cox Media Group	
Spokane	Washington	KDYS-LD	32.1	2026	SagamoreHill Broadcasting	
Yakima	Washington	KCYU-LD	41.2	2015	Rincon Broadcasting Group	
Green Bay	Wisconsin	WMEI	31.6	2024	Weigel Broadcasting	
Milwaukee	Wisconsin	WDJT-TV	58.4	2009	Weigel Broadcasting	
Milwaukee	Wisconsin	WYTU-LD	63	1999	Weigel Broadcasting	
