= KRHD-CD =

Television station in Bryan, Texas

Semi-satellite of KXXV, Waco, Texas
- Bryan–College Station, Texas; United States
- City: Bryan, Texas
- Channels: Digital: 15 (UHF); Virtual: 40
- Branding: 15ABC

Programming
- Affiliations: 40.1: ABC; for others, see § Subchannels

Ownership
- Owner: E. W. Scripps Company; (Scripps Broadcasting Holdings LLC)
- Sister stations: KXXV

History
- First air date: December 10, 1992
- Former call signs: K22DP (1990–1998); KRHD-LP (1998–2010)
- Former channel numbers: Analog: 22 (UHF, 1992–1999), 34 (UHF, 1999–2003), 40 (UHF, 2003–2010); Digital: 40 (UHF, 2010–2020)
- Former affiliations: The Box (1992–1996); AIN (1996–1997); The WB (secondary, January–July 2002)
- Call sign meaning: Ransom H. Drewry, founder of Drewry Communications

Technical information
- Licensing authority: FCC
- Facility ID: 68538
- Class: CD
- ERP: 12 kW
- HAAT: 142.7 m (468 ft)
- Transmitter coordinates: 30°45′26.8″N 96°28′4.6″W

Links
- Public license information: Public file; LMS
- Website: Official website

KRHD-CD (channel 40) is a low-power, Class A television station in Bryan, Texas, United States, serving the Brazos Valley as an affiliate of ABC. Owned by the E. W. Scripps Company, the station maintains a news bureau and advertising sales office on Briarcrest Drive in Bryan; its transmitter is located on US 190 northwest of the city in unincorporated Robertson County. KRHD-CD is a semi-satellite of KXXV (channel 25) in Waco; the stations share network and syndicated programming but have partially split local newscasts and separate local advertising.

The station began as K22DP in 1992 and aired programming from the Video Jukebox Network and American Independent Network. It was acquired by KXXV owner Drewry Communications in 1998 and was relaunched as KRHD-LP, a separate ABC affiliate for the Brazos Valley with the ability to add local programming. In 2001, KXXV began producing a Bryan and College Station–specific newscast for KRHD.

Drewry sold its stations to Raycom Media in 2015; when Raycom merged with Gray Television, KXXV and KRHD were divested and sold to Scripps. Scripps relaunched the Bryan newsroom in 2020 and today produces 22 1/2 hours of weekday newscasts for the Brazos Valley.

== History ==
K22DP began broadcasting on channel 22 on December 10, 1992. The station was owned by Shelley Media of Fort Worth; it was the second low-power TV station in the Bryan–College Station area and broadcast the Video Jukebox Network. The outlet was described by 1996 as airing programming from the American Independent Network, with "sporadic" hours of operation. Meanwhile, KXXV's hold on the eastern part of the market had at times been tenuous. In 1991, TCA Cable, the main cable system in the Brazos Valley, threatened to drop the station from its lineup altogether. This would have left Houston's KTRK-TV as the only ABC affiliate on TCA's lineup. In response, KXXV threatened to invoke Federal Communications Commission market exclusivity rules that would have forced TCA to black out any ABC programming on KTRK. TCA relented and opted to have KXXV trade places with CBS affiliate KBTX-TV on the lineup.

Centex Television Limited Partnership, the subsidiary of Drewry Communications that owned KXXV, purchased K22DP from TV Channel 22, Inc. In February 1998, the station became KRHD-LP. Initially, it rebroadcast KXXV with local commercials and later localized weather cut-ins during Good Morning America. It moved to channel 34 during the course of 1999 as part of a signal upgrade.

KXXV/KRHD added a secondary affiliation with The WB on January 11, 2002, following the sale of the market's previous WB affiliate, KAKW (channel 62), to Univision. KXXV/KRHD aired The WB's prime time lineup after ABC's late night programming, as well as two hours of Kids' WB programming on Sunday mornings. In July 2002, KXXV/KRHD ceded the secondary WB affiliation to Fox affiliate KWKT (channel 44) and its Brazos Valley satellite KYLE (channel 28), which would air the network's prime time programming in an earlier time slot but did not pick up Kids' WB.

In December 2002, Cox Communications, successor to TCA's Bryan–College Station cable system, announced its intent to drop KRHD from its lineup and replace it with KXXV from Waco at year's end. Drewry Broadcasting vigorously objected to this maneuver and denied it retransmission consent approval to carry KXXV directly, having invested $2.5 million since 1999 to station three news reporters, a sports reporter, and two advertising sales representatives in Bryan. Cox never dropped KRHD, continuing to carry the station in its lineup on a series of short-term extensions; a long-term agreement was reached in April 2003, under which Cox also began broadcasting Telemundo on its system. In 2003, KRHD moved from channel 34 to channel 40.

Drewry had planned to sell its stations to London Broadcasting in 2008; however, by January 2009, the deal fell through, and London instead bought KCEN-TV. It was another six years before Drewry sold its broadcasting portfolio to Raycom Media for $160 million in 2015. The sale was completed on December 1.

Raycom announced a $3.6 billion merger into Atlanta-based Gray Television on June 25, 2018. Gray opted to retain KBTX-TV and KWTX-TV in Waco and sold KXXV–KRHD, as well as WTXL-TV in Tallahassee, Florida, to the E. W. Scripps Company for $55 million. The sale was completed on January 2, 2019. One consequence of the sale was that KRHD lost the Telemundo affiliation to KBTX.

On April 3, 2023, the station changed branding to "15ABC", while retaining virtual channel 40.

== News operation ==
On May 30, 2001, KXXV began producing Nightbeat, a local newscast for the Brazos Valley area, for air on KRHD-CA. The newscast had three Bryan-area local reporters, though it was presented from Waco. It was the first competition to KBTX-TV in the Bryan–College Station area. Nightbeat ceased airing on January 5, 2015.

KXXV relaunched KRHD as an independent news operation in the Brazos Valley on September 1, 2020, and added 10 more hours of news with newscasts airing at 11:30 a.m., 5 and 10 p.m., and a 60-minute program, 25 News at 6, airing at 6 p.m. KRHD launched a local version of Good Morning Texas on January 11, 2021, with morning newscasts airing at 5 and 6 a.m. This brought the news output by September 2023 to 4 1/2 hours a day, five days a week.

== Subchannels ==
The station's signal is multiplexed:

Subchannels of KRHD-CD
Subchannel	Res.	Short name	Programming
40.1	720p	ABC-15	ABC
40.2	480i	Mystery	Ion Mystery
40.3	720p	ION	Ion
40.4	480i	GameSho	Game Show Central
40.5	480i	HSN	HSN

In 2010, KRHD flash-cut from analog to digital on channel 40, electing 40 as its virtual channel. In 2020, KRHD moved to digital channel 15.

== See also ==
- Channel 15 digital TV stations in the United States
- Channel 15 low-power TV stations in the United States
- Channel 40 virtual TV stations in the United States
