= KXXV =

Television station in Waco, Texas

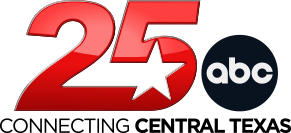
- Waco–Temple–Killeen, Texas; United States
- City: Waco, Texas
- Channels: Digital: 26 (UHF); Virtual: 25
- Branding: 25 News

Programming
- Affiliations: 25.1: ABC; for others, see § Subchannels

Ownership
- Owner: E. W. Scripps Company; (Scripps Broadcasting Holdings LLC)
- Sister stations: KRHD-CD

History
- First air date: March 22, 1985
- Former channel numbers: Analog: 25 (UHF, 1985–2009)
- Former affiliations: NBC (March–December 1985); The WB (secondary, January–July 2002); Telemundo (cable and 25.2, 2002–2019)
- Call sign meaning: "XXV" is the Roman numeral for 25

Technical information
- Licensing authority: FCC
- Facility ID: 9781
- ERP: 1,000 kW
- HAAT: 561.4 m (1,842 ft)
- Transmitter coordinates: 31°20′16.2″N 97°18′36.9″W

Links
- Public license information: Public file; LMS
- Website: www.kxxv.com

KXXV (channel 25) is a television station in Waco, Texas, United States, serving Central Texas as an affiliate of ABC. Owned by the E. W. Scripps Company, the station maintains studios on South New Road in Waco, and its transmitter is located near Moody, Texas. It operates a low-power semi-satellite, KRHD-CD (channel 40, branded as channel 15) in Bryan, with separate local news programming for the Brazos Valley.

KXXV began broadcasting on March 22, 1985, as an NBC affiliate under the local ownership of Central Texas Broadcasting Company. Before channel 25's arrival, the Waco–Temple–Bryan had been the largest market in the United States without full service from all three networks. It switched to ABC in December 1985 when NBC returned to rival KCEN-TV. It has successively been owned by Shamrock Broadcasting, Drewry Communications, Raycom Media, and Scripps. It has typically been a third-place station in local news coverage to its more established competitors.

== History ==
Within weeks of each other in 1977, Central Texas Broadcasting Company, formed by Waco businessman Robert A. Mann, and Business Communications Inc. of Fort Worth applied to the Federal Communications Commission (FCC) for Waco's channel 25. Mann had been approached to be part of the Fort Worth-based group but found he would not own as much of the proposed station as he wished, so he mounted his own application. A third company, Heart O' Texas Broadcasting Company, applied in September, and on December 27, they were joined by Blake-Potash Corporation. The four applications were placed into comparative hearing status by the FCC on December 4, 1979, and hearings concluded a year later.

In November 1981, FCC administrative law judge Edward Kuhlmann issued an initial decision favoring Blake-Potash. However, the other three applicants lodged appeals with the commission's review board. Kuhlmann found all four applicants to be flawed in some form due to improprieties in their owners' business dealings. However, the review board's decision in July to overturn the initial finding and award Central Texas Broadcasting the permit was based on what it felt was an inaccurate assessment of claims regarding integration of ownership and management—the participation of shareholders in the operation of the proposed station. Kuhlmann had rejected the claims from Mann's group as unreasonable, but the review board found this decision unfounded. Blake-Potash appealed this decision to the full FCC, calling Mann an "artful dodger" and alleging he made conflicting claims about his companies to the FCC and the Securities and Exchange Commission; Mann denied the claims.

With the last appeals by Blake-Potash and Heart O' Texas still pending, Central Texas Broadcasting pressed forward. In July 1984, the firm announced that its proposed station would be known as KWVT; it would locate its studios at New Road and Bagby and its transmitter at Moody; and that it would become an affiliate of NBC when it signed on. At the time, the market was the largest in the U.S. without three network-affiliated TV stations for the Big Three networks; KCEN-TV (channel 6) had recently switched to full-time ABC, and KWTX-TV (channel 10) was the CBS affiliate. By the time ground was formally broken on the studios in October, Mann had selected a different call sign: KXXV-TV, from the Roman numeral for 25. Construction was delayed by weather issues; in the meantime, because of KCEN-TV's switch, NBC programs were unavailable in the Waco area for months. KXXV debuted on March 22, 1985.

Six months after channel 25 signed on the air, NBC announced it would return to KCEN-TV, which had been its longtime affiliate in the market. At the time, NBC was ascendant in the national ratings, and it sought to improve its standing in much the same way ABC had in the late 1970s and early 1980s; KCEN-TV was among the first stations to switch to the network. Though channel 25's affiliation agreement with NBC ran through August 1986, KXXV came to an affiliation agreement with ABC and agreed with KCEN-TV to move the affiliation switch forward by eight months to December 30, 1985.

In 1987, Central Texas Broadcasting filed to sell KXXV to Shamrock Broadcasting for $12.5 million; the FCC granted approval of the transaction over an appeal from shareholders of Heart O' Texas, by now defunct, but the sale was not completed until the first week of 1988.

Shamrock announced in 1990 that it intended to sell KXXV, KTAB-TV in Abilene, and three radio stations, but KXXV was not sold until 1994, when it was purchased by Drewry Communications of Lawton, Oklahoma; Drewry had previously expressed interest in buying channel 25. While Shamrock was selling in order to focus on larger-market broadcast properties, Drewry owned network affiliates in Texas and Oklahoma. Drewry took over on December 1, 1994; it dismissed five of the station's senior executives, including the general manager. In 1998, Drewry acquired K22DP, a low-power station in Bryan, and relaunched it as KRHD-LP, a semi-satellite of KXXV with local advertising and the ability to insert local programming.

KXXV/KRHD added a secondary affiliation with The WB on January 11, 2002, following the sale of the market's previous WB affiliate, KAKW (channel 62), to Univision. KXXV/KRHD aired The WB's prime time lineup after ABC's late night programming, as well as two hours of Kids' WB programming on Sunday mornings. In July 2002, KXXV/KRHD ceded the secondary WB affiliation to Fox affiliate KWKT (channel 44) and its Brazos Valley satellite KYLE (channel 28), which would air the network's prime time programming in an earlier time slot but did not pick up Kids' WB. At the same time as channel 25 picked up The WB, it also became the local affiliate of Telemundo, taking over the local channel on the Time Warner Cable system and adding local news briefs and advertising.

On November 29, 2004, a Sikorsky UH-60 Black Hawk from nearby Fort Hood clipped guy wires of the KXXV tower near Moody; the helicopter then crashed, killing all seven aboard. The lights on the tower were not functioning as a result of recent storms; the station had duly warned the Federal Aviation Administration about the light failure.

Drewry had planned to sell its stations to London Broadcasting in 2008; however, by January 2009, the deal fell through, and London instead bought KCEN-TV. Another six years passed before Drewry sold its broadcasting portfolio to Raycom Media for $160 million in 2015.

Raycom announced a $3.6 billion merger into Atlanta-based Gray Television on June 25, 2018. Gray opted to retain KWTX-TV and KBTX-TV in Bryan and sold KXXV–KRHD, as well as WTXL-TV in Tallahassee, Florida, to the E. W. Scripps Company for $55 million. The sale was completed on January 2, 2019. One consequence of the sale was that KXXV lost the Telemundo affiliation to KWTX.

== News operation ==
KXXV debuted 5 and 10 p.m. local newscasts at its launch in March 1985, originally titled Eyewitness News. The early report moved to 6 p.m. by 1986, putting it in direct competition with KCEN and KWTX. The station was a third-place finisher, particularly behind second-place KCEN in early evening news; the May 1989 Arbitron survey saw KXXV edge ahead of KCEN for second for the first time in station history, but it slipped back to third in 1990 and was still there by the time Shamrock sold channel 25 to Drewry.

Drewry made major changes in the station's newscasts after taking over. It refused to rehire the news director, and it fired Ric Streed, who had been the lead male anchor for the station since it began broadcasting. A morning newscast debuted in October 1995, followed by weekend morning newscasts the next year. The company also invested $1.5 million in severe weather coverage; it acquired new vehicles, became the second local station with Doppler weather radar, and started a weather channel on the local cable system. In spite of these improvements, the station was still in third place in 2003.

The station maintains a news bureau in Killeen to serve the western portion of the area, including Fort Hood, and relaunched a Bryan–College Station bureau for KRHD in 2020.

=== Notable alumni ===
- E. D. Hill – reporter/anchor (1985–1986), known as Edye Grant at KXXV
- Gus Johnson – sportscaster (c. 1988–1989)

== Technical information ==
=== Subchannels ===
KXXV's transmitter is located near Moody, Texas. The station's signal is multiplexed:

Subchannels of KXXV
Subchannel	Res.	Short name	Programming
25.1	720p	KXXV-TV	ABC
25.2	480i	Grit	Grit
25.3	480i	CourtTV	Court TV
25.4	480i	ION	Ion
25.5	480i	BUSTED	Busted
25.6	480i	QVC	QVC
25.7	480i	MVSGLD	MovieSphere Gold

KXXV began broadcasting a digital signal by January 2004. It initially decided not to broadcast ABC in high-definition, instead offering Telemundo and its weather channel as subchannels. The station shut down its analog signal, over UHF channel 25, on February 17, 2009, the original target date for full-power TV stations to transition from analog to digital broadcasts under federal mandate (which was later pushed back to June 12, 2009). The station's digital signal remained on its pre-transition UHF channel 26, using virtual channel 25.
