= KFDA-TV =

Television station in Amarillo, Texas

- Amarillo, Texas; United States
- Channels: Digital: 10 (VHF); Virtual: 10
- Branding: NewsChannel 10; NewsChannel 10 Too (10.2); Telemundo Amarillo (10.3); MeTV Amarillo (on 10.4)

Programming
- Affiliations: 10.1: CBS; for others, see § Subchannels

Ownership
- Owner: Gray Media; (Gray Television Licensee, LLC)
- Sister stations: KEYU

History
- First air date: April 4, 1953
- Former channel numbers: Analog: 10 (VHF, 1953–2009); Digital: 9 (VHF, 2001–2009)
- Former affiliations: ABC (secondary, 1953–1957)
- Call sign meaning: Derived from KFDA radio, whose call letters were randomly assigned

Technical information
- Licensing authority: FCC
- Facility ID: 51466
- ERP: 62 kW
- HAAT: 466 m (1,529 ft)
- Transmitter coordinates: 35°17′34″N 101°50′44″W
- Translator(s): see § Subchannels

Links
- Public license information: Public file; LMS
- Website: www.newschannel10.com

KFDA-TV (channel 10) is a television station in Amarillo, Texas, United States, affiliated with CBS. It is owned by Gray Media alongside Borger-licensed Telemundo affiliate KEYU (channel 31). The two stations share studios on Broadway Drive (just south of West Cherry Avenue) in northern Amarillo, where KFDA's transmitter is also located.

== History ==
=== Early history ===
On July 3, 1952, the Amarillo Broadcasting Company—a consortium led by radio station owners Wendell Mayes, oil, gas and publishing interest holder C. C. Woodson, Charles B. Jordan (vice president and assistant general manager of the Texas State Network), and Gene L. Cagle (Texas State Network president and general manager)—filed an application with the Federal Communications Commission (FCC) to obtain a license and construction permit to operate a commercial television station on VHF channel 10. The FCC awarded the license and permit for channel 10 to the Amarillo Broadcasting Company on October 8, 1952; the group subsequently requested and received approval to assign KFDA-TV as the television station's call letters, using the base callsign that had been used by its existing radio station on KFDA (1440 AM, now KPUR) since it signed on in March 1939.

The station first signed on the air on April 4, 1953; it was the second television station to sign on in the Amarillo market, debuting two weeks after NBC affiliate KGNC-TV (channel 4, now KAMR-TV) launched as the market's first television station on March 18. Channel 10 has been an CBS television affiliate since its debut; however, it also initially carried programming from ABC, inheriting those rights through KFDA radio's longtime relationship with the television network's progenitor ABC Radio, which had been affiliated with that station since 1943 (as the post-NBC-split Blue Network).

In January 1954, the Texas State Network (TSN)—a broadcasting consortium owned by Sid W. Richardson (philanthropist and owner of, among other petroleum firms in the state, Fort Worth-based Sid W. Richardson Inc. and Richardson and Bass Oil Producers), media executive Gene L. Cagle, mineral rights firm owner R. K. Hanger, company president Charles B. Jordan and D. C. Homburg—acquired a 75% controlling stake in KFDA-AM-TV from the original stockholders for $525,000, with Jordan retaining his existing 25% interest. KFDA disaffiliated from ABC shortly before KVII-TV (channel 7) signed on as an affiliate of that network on December 21, 1957, with the station remaining an exclusive CBS affiliate. In January 1958, Jordan divested his stake in KFDA-TV to TSN/Amarillo Broadcasting in exchange for full ownership of KFDA radio through his firm, the Lone Star Broadcasting Company. Despite this separation of ownership, the KFDA television and radio stations continued to share a base call sign until 1966, when the radio station changed its call letters to KPUR, in order to comply with a since-repealed FCC rule that prohibited separately owned television and radio stations that were based in the same media market from sharing the same call letters.

In an effort to expand its viewing area, KFDA-TV launched a network of UHF translators to serve areas of the Texas Panhandle that were not covered by its main signal. KFDA's parent companies during the timeframe also acquired two standalone network affiliates during the mid-1960s for conversion into satellite stations to reach areas where its primary signal was impaired by some of the rugged terrain within the Panhandle. The station was all but unviewable in Clovis, Portales and surrounding areas of northeastern New Mexico as well as portions of the far eastern Texas Panhandle. Many viewers in those areas received CBS programming either via KGGM-TV (now KRQE-TV) in Albuquerque or KWTV in Oklahoma City. On September 11, 1963, the Texas State Network purchased primary CBS and secondary ABC affiliate KICA-TV (channel 12) in Clovis from Marshall Enterprises (owned by John H. Marshall Sr., John H. Marshall Jr., Lena V. Marshall and Carolyn A. Marshall) for $350,000; the sale was approved on January 22, 1964. TSN subsequently changed the Clovis station's call letters to KFDW-TV to match its new parent station.

The owner of KFDA-TV and its satellites changed its name from the Texas State Network to the Bass Broadcasting Company—by then, led by investor/philanthropist Perry R. Bass—in April 1965 (following TSN's sale of KFJZ-AM-FM in Fort Worth to a company that subsequently took on the Texas State Network name). The following year, in February 1966, the Bass family acquired a majority stake in the company from the Sid W. Richardson Foundation (a move that followed concerns from Congress and the Treasury Department regarding nonprofit foundations' business interests) and Gene Cagle (who gave up his interest in Bass in exchange for acquiring KRIO in McAllen from the company) for nearly $2.3 million. On July 1 of that year, Bass Broadcasting acquired CBS affiliate KSWB (channel 8) in Elk City, Oklahoma, from Southwest Broadcasting Company (owned by Lonnie J. Preston and Alice H. Preston) for $275,000, including a non-compete agreement for Southwest Broadcasting worth $50,000. The sale, along with a concurrent renewal request for the KSWB license and proposed upgrades to its transmitter facility, received FCC approval on November 17, 1965. In September 1966, KSWB was converted into a KFDA satellite under the call letters KFDO-TV (which also had its city of license relocated to the nearby city of Sayre), to relay its programming into portions of western Oklahoma who could not adequately receive CBS programming from KWTV.

The Bass family decided to exit broadcasting in the mid-1970s to focus on their oil and gas exploration interests. In October 1975, Bass Broadcasting Co. sold KFDO-TV to Amarillo-based Marsh Media Ltd.—owned by entrepreneur and philanthropist Stanley Marsh 3, Tom F. Marsh, Michael C. Marsh and Estelle Marsh Wattlington—for $300,000; Marsh converted KFDO into a satellite station of KVII (under the new calls KVIJ-TV), and along with it, changing the satellite's affiliation from CBS to ABC, serving areas where reception of KOCO-TV in Oklahoma City was not sufficient. (KVIJ ceased operations on December 2, 1992, citing the fact that the majority of ABC's viewership in west-central Oklahoma came via either reception of KOCO-TV or KSWO-TV in Lawton on local cable providers in that area.)

=== Transfer to Drewry ===
In May 1976, KFDA-TV was sold to the Panhandle Telecasting Company (originally known as Amarillo Telecasters, and under licensee to Midessa Television Inc.)—a partnership of Ray Herndon, majority owner of KMID-TV in Midland, and R.H. Drewry, owner of KSWO-TV in Lawton, Oklahoma—for $2.8 million; the sale was received FCC approval 3½ months later on August 20. The sale of KFDA did not include KFDW-TV, which was instead included in a sale of Bass's remaining stations to Mel Wheeler, Inc. a few months later in a $2.2-million deal. (After subsequent sales, KFDW would become KMCC-TV, a satellite of Lubbock ABC affiliate KAMC in 1979, and KVIH-TV, a satellite of KVII, in 1986; KVIH remains a KVII satellite to this day.) In October 1983, Drewry (through his Lawton Cablevision Inc. subsidiary) acquired majority control of KFDA for $3 million; the transaction received FCC approval on February 27, 1984.

On July 1, 2008, Drewry Communications Group announced its intention to sell its eleven television stations (as well as sister radio property KTXC in Lamesa) to the Dallas-based London Broadcasting Company—a company founded by Terry E. London, former CEO of Gaylord Entertainment, the previous year to acquire broadcast properties in small to mid-sized markets within Texas, beginning operations with the February 2008 purchase of CBS affiliate KYTX in Tyler—for $115 million. While the deal received approval by the FCC, London Broadcasting filed a notice of non-consummation to the FCC in January 2009, after company management decided to terminate the deal due to market uncertainties resulting from the Great Recession.

On February 23, 2011, KFDA became the first television station in the Amarillo market (and the West Texas region as a whole) to carry syndicated programming and advertisements inserted during local commercial breaks (including station and network promos) in high definition. The station upgraded its master control facilities to allow content not directly fed by CBS or produced in-house to be transmitted in HD.

=== Raycom ownership and sale to Gray ===
On August 10, 2015, Montgomery, Alabama–based Raycom Media announced that it would purchase Drewry Communications' eight television and two radio stations (which by then included Amarillo radio station KEYU-FM (102.9, now KVWE)) for $160 million. The sale was completed on December 1; as result of the Raycom purchase, KFDA gained a new sister station in NBC affiliate KCBD in the adjacent Lubbock market (which Raycom has owned since it acquired Greenville, South Carolina–based Liberty Corporation's television broadcasting unit in 2006.).

On June 25, 2018, Atlanta-based Gray Television announced it had reached an agreement with Raycom to merge their respective broadcasting assets (consisting of Raycom's 63 existing owned-and/or-operated television stations, including KFDA-TV and KEYU as well as Lubbock sister station KCBD, and Gray's 93 television stations) under the former's corporate umbrella. The cash-and-stock merger transaction valued at $3.6 billion—in which Gray shareholders would acquire preferred stock currently held by Raycom—resulted in KFDA/KEYU gaining a new sister station in the Odessa–Midland market as Gray retained ownership of fellow CBS affiliate KOSA-TV in exchange for selling NBC affiliate KWES-TV (which was sold to Tegna Inc., along with CBS affiliate WTOL in Toledo, Ohio, to comply with FCC ownership rules prohibiting common ownership of two of the four highest-rated stations in a single market). The sale was approved on December 20, and was completed on January 2, 2019.

== Programming ==
KFDA-TV clears the entire CBS network schedule, though the third hour of the Saturday CBS Weekend educational block airs before CBS Sunday Morning instead due to the station's Saturday morning airing of Your Home Town View, an hour-long brokered local real estate program produced by the station's advertising department in association with Keller Williams Realty Amarillo. The show also airs in several timeslots on KFDA-DT2 throughout the week.

=== Chicago Hope controversy ===
On October 14, 1999, KFDA preempted an episode of Chicago Hope in which Mark Harmon's character Jack McNeil says the word "shit" while amputating a boy's leg and replaced the show with local programming. The station's then-vice president and general manager Mike Lee decided that the station would not air the episode due to the curse word and later apologized to viewers for the network's poor choice, but not for the local decision to preempt.

=== News operation ===
As of May 2025, KFDA-TV currently broadcasts 30 hours, 35 minutes of locally produced newscasts each week (with 5 hours, 35 minutes each weekday; 1 hour, 35 minutes on Saturdays; and 1 hour, 5 minutes on Sundays). In regards of the total number of hours, it is the highest news input in the Texas Panhandle market. In addition, KFDA-DT2 broadcasts 12 1/2 hours of locally produced newscasts each week: a morning newscast consisting of a combined second-hour simulcast and half-hour exclusive extension of the NewsChannel 10 Early Show, and a simulcast of the hour-long 6 p.m. newscast carried on the station's main feed. These air only on weekdays. The station may also simulcast long-form severe weather coverage on "NewsChannel 10 Too" in the event that a tornado warning is issued for any county within the Texas and Oklahoma Panhandles as well as Eastern New Mexico.

On February 23, 2011, KFDA became the first television station in the Amarillo market to upgrade production and transmission of its local newscasts to high definition.

=== Other local programming ===
Channel 10 served as the Amarillo market's "Love Network" affiliate for the Muscular Dystrophy Association's Jerry Lewis MDA Labor Day Telethon for 39 years from 1973 to 2012. Because of the station's commitments to run CBS' entertainment and sports programming, KFDA usually aired the telethon on a three-hour tape delay following its 10 p.m. newscast on the Sunday preceding Labor Day. For the same reason, when the telethon was reduced to a six-hour prime time telecast on the Sunday before Labor Day in September 2011, the broadcast was transferred over to KFDA-DT2 to allow the main feed to fulfill its CBS programming commitments. (The broadcast—by then reduced to a two-hour special—moved to ABC in September 2013, airing thereafter by association on KVII-TV until the final telecast of the retitled MDA Show of Strength in August 2014.)

On September 10, 2018, the station began producing a local program called NewsChannel 10's 2nd Cup, which airs weekdays at 9 a.m.

In 2020, KFDA-DT2 began producing a local morning talk show known as The Chat, which partnered with radio station KGNC 710 AM which aired weekdays at 7 a.m. The program was discontinued in 2024.

In 2025, KFDA announced an agreement with the Amarillo Sod Poodles of Minor League Baseball to air Sunday home games on the station's second subchannel.

On May 3, 2025, KFDA-TV started producing a "Good News Edition" that airs Saturdays at 10:35 p.m.

==== Notable former on-air staff ====
- Brian Wilson – reporter

== Technical information ==
=== Subchannels ===
The station's digital signal is multiplexed:

Subchannels of KFDA-TV
Channel	Res.	Short name	Programming
10.1	1080i	KFDA	CBS
10.2	480i	KZBZ	NewsChannel 10 Too
10.3	480i	KEYU	Telemundo (KEYU)
10.4	480i	MeTV	MeTV
10.5	480i	COZI	Cozi TV
10.6	480i	Oxygen	Oxygen

Broadcast on behalf of another station

=== Analog-to-digital conversion ===
KFDA began transmitting a digital television signal on UHF channel 39 on September 1, 2002. It became the first television station in Amarillo to begin digital broadcasting operations upon sign-on of the digital channel as well as the first station in the market to simulcast programming content in high definition.

The station shut down its analog signal, over VHF channel 10, on June 12, 2009, the official date on which full-power television stations in the United States transitioned from analog to digital television under federal mandate. The station's digital signal moved to its pre-transition VHF channel 10.

=== Translators ===
In addition to maintaining cable carriage within this area, KFDA-TV covers a large portion of the Texas and Oklahoma Panhandles, northeastern New Mexico and far southwestern Kansas through a network of translators that distribute its programming beyond the 75.2-mile-wide (121.0 km) range corridor of its broadcast signal (all translators transmit on virtual channel 10):

- K18MD-D Childress, TX
- K33PX-D Clarendon, TX
- KZBZ-CD Clovis, NM
- K32GD-D Guymon, OK
- K34NQ-D Memphis, TX
- K32EH-D Memphis, TX
- K26OJ-D Tucumcari, NM
- K21NW-D Tulia, TX
- K26JR-D Turkey, TX

== See also ==
- Channel 10 digital TV stations in the United States
- Channel 10 virtual TV stations in the United States
