= KVLM =

Radio station in Tarzan, Texas

Coordinates: 32°23′45″N 101°57′21″W

- Tarzan, Texas; United States
- Broadcast area: Midland–Big Spring–Odessa
- Frequency: 104.7 MHz

Programming
- Format: Conservative talk; Christian radio
- Network: VCY America
- Affiliations: SRN News

Ownership
- Owner: VCY America, Inc.
- Sister stations: KVCE

History
- First air date: June 1, 1977
- Former call signs: KCOT (1976–1987); KRTX (1987); KLSC (1987–1992); KMMX (1992–1996); KIOL (1996–1999); KAXT (1999); KATX (1999); KAXT (1999); KTXC (1999–2022)
- Call sign meaning: VCY Lamesa

Technical information
- Licensing authority: FCC
- Facility ID: 71650
- Class: C1
- ERP: 100,000 watts
- HAAT: 245 meters (804 ft)

Links
- Public license information: Public file; LMS
- Webcast: Listen live
- Website: www.vcyamerica.org

KVLM (104.7 FM) is a non-commercial radio station licensed to Tarzan, Texas, United States, and serving the Midland-Big Spring-Odessa region. It broadcasts a Christian radio format and is owned by VCY America, Inc. The station airs a mix of Christian talk and teaching shows and Christian music. SRN News provides updates.

KVLM's transmitter is on FM 829 in Tarzan, Texas.

== History ==
The station signed on the air on June 1, 1977, as originally KCOT, broadcasting on 104.7 MHz. It was a sister station of KPET 690 AM. It was sold in 1983 to a group that controlled KBYG Big Spring. The signal was expanded to 100 kilowatts from an 800-foot tower.

Another station started at 100.3 FM in the area in 1987. In 1988, the two stations exchanged frequencies. This was reversed in 1996 when the southern signal for Lamesa, Big Spring and Midland returned to 104.7.

On August 21, 2002, Graham Brothers Communications announced that it would sell KTXC to Drewry Communications for $740,000. The deal marked Drewry's re-entry into radio, as the company had previously sold KSWO radio (now KKRX) in the company's homebase of Lawton, Oklahoma to Perry Publishing & Broadcasting Company in 1998.

On August 10, 2015, Raycom Media announced that it would purchase Drewry Communications for $160 million. The deal was completed on December 1, 2015. KTXC, along with KEYU-FM in Amarillo, were Raycom's first radio stations since the company sold WMC AM-FM in Memphis, Tennessee to Infinity Broadcasting Corporation in 2000.

On June 25, 2018, Gray Television announced its intent to acquire Raycom for $3.65 billion, pending regulatory approval. The sale was completed on January 2, 2019.

In 2021, it was announced that VCY America would acquire the station for $650,000. The sale was completed on April 14, 2022. The station changed its call sign to KVLM on April 26.

Effective September 18, 2023, the station moved its community of license from Lamesa to Tarzan.
