= List of stations owned or operated by Gray Media =

The following is a list of stations owned or operated by Gray Media. Gray owns or operates 180 stations across 113 markets in the United States, ranging from as large as Atlanta, Georgia, to one of the smallest markets, North Platte, Nebraska.

== Current stations ==
Stations are arranged alphabetically by state and by city of license.

- (**) indicates a station that was built and signed-on by Gray.

=== Television ===
Media market	State	Station	Purchased	Affiliation	Notes
Birmingham–Tuscaloosa–Anniston	Alabama	WBRC	2019	Fox	
Birmingham–Tuscaloosa–Anniston	Alabama	WTBM-CD	2022	Telemundo	
Dothan	Alabama	WTVY	2002	CBS; MeTV/MyNet (DT2); CW+ (DT3); NBC (DT4)	
Dothan	Alabama	WRGX-LD	2013	NBC; CW+ (LD2); Telemundo (LD3)	
Huntsville	Alabama	WTHV-LD	2022	Telemundo	
Huntsville	Alabama	WAAY-TV	2026	ABC	
Huntsville	Alabama	WAFF	2019	NBC	
Mobile	Alabama	WALA-TV	2021	Fox	
Mobile	Alabama	WMBP-LD	2022	Telemundo	
Montgomery	Alabama	WSFA	2019	NBC	
Montgomery	Alabama	WALE-LD	2026	Local weather	
Montgomery	Alabama	WCOV-TV	2026	Fox	
Montgomery	Alabama	WIYC	2026	Cozi TV	
Anchorage	Alaska	KTUU-TV	2016	NBC	
Anchorage	Alaska	KAUU	2016	CBS; MyNet (DT4)	
Fairbanks	Alaska	KTVF	2017	NBC; MeTV/MyNet (DT2); CBS (DT3)	
Fairbanks	Alaska	KXDF-CD	2017	CBS; NBC (CD2)	
Fairbanks	Alaska	KFXF-CD	2017	MeTV/MyNet; CBS (CD2)	
Juneau	Alaska	KATH-LD	2020	NBC	
Juneau	Alaska	KYEX-LD	2020	CBS; MyNet (LD4)	(Note: Satellite of KAUU.)
Ketchikan	Alaska	KUBD	2020	CBS; MyNet (DT4); NBC (2.1)	(Note: Satellite of KYEX-LD.)
Sitka	Alaska	KSCT-LD	2020	NBC; CBS (5.1); MyNet (5.4)	(Note: Satellite of KATH-LD.)
Flagstaff	Arizona	KAZF	2023	Independent	(Note: Satellite of KPHE-LD.)
Phoenix	Arizona	KTVK	2021	Independent	
Phoenix	Arizona	KPHO-TV	2021	CBS	
Phoenix	Arizona	KPHE-LD	2022	Independent	
Tucson	Arizona	KMSB	2019	Fox	(Note: Owned by Tegna Inc.)
Tucson	Arizona	KOLD-TV	2019	CBS; MeTV (DT2)	
Tucson	Arizona	KTTU	2019	MyNet	
Yuma	Arizona	KAZS	2023	Independent	
Jonesboro	Arkansas	KAIT	2019	ABC; NBC (DT2); CW+ (DT3)	
Hartford–New Haven	Connecticut	WFSB	2021	CBS	
Hartford–New Haven	Connecticut	WWAX-LD	2022	Independent	
Gainesville	Florida	WCJB-TV	2017	ABC; CW+ (DT2)	
Gainesville	Florida	WTGB-LD	2024	MeTV Toons (LD2)	
Panama City	Florida	WJHG-TV	1960	NBC; MeTV (DT2); CBS (DT3)	
Panama City	Florida	WECP-LD	2012	CBS; MyNet (LD2)	
Sarasota	Florida	WWSB	2019	ABC	
Tallahassee–Live Oak	Florida	WCTV	1996	CBS; MeTV (DT2); MyNet (DT6)	
Tallahassee–Live Oak	Florida	WTFL-LD	2021	Telemundo; MyNet (DT4)	
Tallahassee–Live Oak	Florida	WNXG-LD	2017	CBS; MeTV (DT2)	(Note: Translator of WCTV.)
Tallahassee–Live Oak	Florida	WFXU	2017	MyNet	
West Palm Beach	Florida	WFLX	2019	Fox	(Note: Operated by the E. W. Scripps Company.)
Albany	Georgia	WALB **	2019	NBC; ABC (DT2); CW+ (DT4)	(Note: Previously owned by Gray from 1954–1998.)
Albany	Georgia	WGCW-LD	2019	CW+	
Atlanta–Norcross	Georgia	WPCH-TV	2021	CW	
Atlanta–Norcross	Georgia	WANF	2021	Independent	
Atlanta–Norcross	Georgia	WKTB-CD	2022	Telemundo	
Augusta	Georgia	WRDW-TV	1996	CBS; NBC (DT2); MyNet (DT3)	
Augusta	Georgia	WGAT-LD	2022	Telemundo; NBC (LD2)	
Augusta	Georgia	WAGT-CD	2016	NBC	
Columbus	Georgia	WTVM	2019	ABC	
Columbus	Georgia	WLTZ	2026	NBC; CW+ (DT2)	
Columbus	Georgia	WXTX	2019	Fox	(Note: Owned by American Spirit Media.)
Macon–Perry	Georgia	WPGA-TV	2023	MeTV	
Macon–Perry	Georgia	WPGA-LD	2023	Peachtree Sports Network	
Savannah	Georgia	WTOC-TV	2019	CBS	
Honolulu	Hawaii	KGMB	2019	CBS	
Honolulu	Hawaii	KHNL	2019	NBC; Independent (DT2); Telemundo (DT5)	
Hilo–Kailua-Kona	Hawaii	KFVE	2020	Independent; Telemundo (DT2)	
Hilo–Kailua-Kona	Hawaii	KSIX-TV	2019	NBC; Independent (DT2); CBS (DT3)	(Note: Satellite of KHNL.)
Wailuku–Maui	Hawaii	KOGG	2019	NBC; Independent (DT2); CBS (DT3)	
Champaign–Urbana	Illinois	WBXC-CD	2022	Heartland	
Decatur	Illinois	WAND	2026	NBC	
Peoria	Illinois	WEEK-TV	2021	NBC; ABC (DT2); CW+ (DT3)	
Peoria	Illinois	WHOI	2025	MyNet	
Quincy	Illinois	WGEM-TV	2021	NBC; CW+ (DT2); Fox (DT3); MeTV (DT4)	
Rockford	Illinois	WREX	2026	NBC	
Rockford	Illinois	WSLN	2023	CW+	
Rockford	Illinois	WIFR-LD	2016	CBS	
Evansville	Indiana	WFIE	2019	NBC; MeTV (DT2)	
Evansville	Indiana	WEVV-TV	2026	CBS; Fox/MyNet (DT2)	
Evansville	Indiana	WEEV-LD	2026	Fox/MyNet	
Fort Wayne	Indiana	WPTA	2021	ABC; NBC (DT2); MyNet (DT3)	
Fort Wayne	Indiana	WISE-TV	2021	CW+	
Fort Wayne	Indiana	WFFT-TV	2026	Fox	
Fort Wayne	Indiana	WLMO-LD	2026	Telemundo	
Lafayette	Indiana	WLFI-TV	2026	CBS; CW+ (DT2)	
South Bend–Elkhart	Indiana	WNDU-TV	2006	NBC	
Terre Haute	Indiana	WTHI-TV	2026	CBS; Fox/MyNet (DT2); MeTV (DT3)	
Cedar Rapids	Iowa	KCRG-TV	2015	ABC; MyNet (DT2); CW (DT3)	
Davenport	Iowa	KWQC-TV	2017	NBC	
Ottumwa	Iowa	KYOU-TV	2019	Fox; NBC (DT2); CW+ (DT4)	
Sioux City	Iowa	KTIV	2021	NBC; CW+ (DT2); MeTV (DT3)	
Ensign	Kansas	KBSD-DT	2016	CBS	(Note: Satellite of KWCH-DT.)
Goodland	Kansas	KBSL-DT	2016	CBS	
Hays	Kansas	KBSH-DT	2016	CBS	
Topeka	Kansas	WIBW-TV	2002	CBS; MeTV/MyNet (DT2)	
Wichita–Hutchinson	Kansas	KWCH-DT	2016	CBS	
Wichita–Hutchinson	Kansas	KSCW-DT	2016	CW	
Bowling Green	Kentucky	WBKO	2002	ABC; Fox (DT2); CW+ (DT3)	
Bowling Green	Kentucky	WBGS-CD	2016	Telemundo; ABC (LD2)	
Hazard	Kentucky	WYMT-TV	1993	CBS	(Note: Semi-satellite of WKYT-TV.)
Lexington	Kentucky	WKYT-TV	1993	CBS; CW (DT2)	
Louisville	Kentucky	WAVE	2019	NBC	
Louisville	Kentucky	WDRB	2026	Fox	
Louisville	Kentucky	WBKI	2026	CW; MyNet (DT2)	
Alexandria	Louisiana	KLGC-LD	2021	CW+	(Note: Translator of KALB-TV.)
Alexandria	Louisiana	KALB-TV	2014	NBC; CBS (DT2); CW+ (DT3)	
Baton Rouge	Louisiana	WAFB	2019	CBS; MyNet (DT4)	
Baton Rouge	Louisiana	WBXH-CD	2019	MyNet; MeTV (DT2)	
Lafayette	Louisiana	KATC	2026	ABC	
Lafayette	Louisiana	KADN-TV	2026	Fox; NBC (DT2); Independent/MyNet (DT3)	
Lafayette	Louisiana	KLAF-LD	2026	NBC	
Lafayette	Louisiana	KNGC-LD	2025	Gulf Coast SEN; Telemundo (DT2)	
Lake Charles	Louisiana	KPLC	2019	NBC; CW+ (DT2)	
Lake Charles	Louisiana	KVHP	2019	Fox; ABC (DT2)	
Monroe	Louisiana	KNOE-TV	2014	CBS; ABC (DT2); Gulf Coast SEN (DT3)	
Monroe	Louisiana	KCWL-LD	2017	Gulf Coast SEN	(Note: Translator of KNOE-TV.)
New Orleans	Louisiana	WVUE-DT	2019	Fox	
Shreveport	Louisiana	KSLA	2019	CBS	
Shreveport	Louisiana	KTSH-CD	2022	Telemundo	
Bangor	Maine	WABI-TV	2017	CBS; CW+ (DT2)	
Presque Isle–Fort Kent	Maine	WAGM-TV	2015	CBS; Fox (DT2); CW+ (DT3)	
Presque Isle–Fort Kent	Maine	WWPI-CD **	2020	NBC	
Springfield	Massachusetts	WSHM-LD	2021	CBS	(Note: Semi-satellite of WFSB.)
Springfield	Massachusetts	WGGB-TV	2021	ABC; Fox/MyNet (DT2)	
Bay City–Flint–Saginaw	Michigan	WNEM-TV	2021	CBS; MyNet (DT2)	
Lansing–Onondaga	Michigan	WILX-TV	2002	NBC	
Lansing–Onondaga	Michigan	WLNM-LD	2020	NBC	(Note: Translator of WILX-TV.)
Lansing–Onondaga	Michigan	WSYM-TV	2026	Fox; Independent (DT2)	
Marquette	Michigan	WLUC-TV	2016	NBC; Fox (DT2)	
Chisholm	Minnesota	KRII-TV	2021	NBC; CBS (DT2)	(Note: Satellite of KBJR-TV.)
Duluth	Minnesota	KDLH	2021	CW	
Duluth	Minnesota	KBJR-TV	2021	NBC; CBS (DT2)	
Mankato	Minnesota	KMNF-CD **	2019	NBC; CW (LD2)	
Mankato	Minnesota	KEYC-TV	2019	CBS; Fox (DT2)	
Rochester	Minnesota	KTTC	2021	NBC; CW (DT2)	
Rochester	Minnesota	KXLT-TV	2025	Fox; MeTV (DT2)	
Biloxi	Mississippi	WLOX	2019	ABC; CBS (DT2)	
Jackson	Mississippi	WLBT	2019	NBC	
Jackson	Mississippi	WLOO	—N/a	MyNet	(Note: Owned by Tougaloo College and operated by American Spirit Media with engineering support by Gray.)
Jackson	Mississippi	WDBD	2019	Fox	
Laurel–Hattiesburg	Mississippi	WDAM-TV	2019	NBC; ABC (DT2)	
Meridian	Mississippi	WTOK-TV	2002	ABC; MyNet (DT2); CW (DT3)	
Tupelo–Columbus	Mississippi	WTVA	2026	NBC; ABC (DT2)	
Cape Girardeau	Missouri	WSIL-TV	2026	ABC	
Cape Girardeau	Missouri	WQWQ-LD	2019	Telemundo	
Cape Girardeau	Missouri	KFVS-TV	2019	CBS; CW (DT2); MeTV (DT4)	
Cape Girardeau	Missouri	KPOB-TV	2026	ABC	(Note: Satellite of WSIL-TV)
Kansas City	Missouri	KCTV	2021	CBS	
Kansas City	Missouri	KSMO-TV	2021	MyNet	
St. Louis	Missouri	KMOV	2021	CBS; MyNet (DT2)	
Springfield–Branson	Missouri	KYTV	2016	NBC	
Springfield–Branson	Missouri	K17DL-D	2016	Independent	(Note: Owned by Branson Visitors TV; Gray holds a 50.1% interest in this company.)
Springfield–Branson	Missouri	KYCW-LD	2016	CW	
Springfield–Branson	Missouri	KSPR-LD	2016	ABC	
Grand Island–Hastings	Nebraska	KNHL	2019	MeTV/MyNet	
Grand Island–Hastings	Nebraska	KGIN	1998	CBS; NBC (DT2); MeTV/MyNet (DT3)	(Note: Semi-satellite of KOLN.)
Lincoln–York	Nebraska	KSNB-TV	2013	NBC; MeTV/MyNet (DT2)	
Lincoln–York	Nebraska	KOLN	1998	CBS	
Lincoln–York	Nebraska	KCWH-LD	2013	CW; CBS (LD3)	
North Platte	Nebraska	KNOP-TV	2014	NBC; Fox (DT2)	
North Platte	Nebraska	KNPL-LD	1998	CBS; MeTV/MyNet (LD2); CW (LD3)	
North Platte	Nebraska	KIIT-CD	2014	Fox; CW (CD2)	
Omaha	Nebraska	WOWT	2002	NBC	
Las Vegas–Henderson	Nevada	KVVU-TV	2021	Fox	
Reno	Nevada	KOLO-TV	2002	ABC; MeTV (DT2); CW (DT3)	
Binghamton	New York	WBNG-TV	2021	CBS; CW (DT2)	
Massena	New York	WWNY-CD	2019	CBS; Fox (CD2)	(Note: Translator of WWNY-TV.)
Watertown–Carthage	New York	WWNY-TV	2019	CBS; Fox (DT2)	
Watertown–Carthage	New York	WNYF-CD	2019	Fox; MeTV (DT2)	
Charlotte	North Carolina	WBTV	2019	CBS	
Greenville–Washington–Jacksonville–New Bern	North Carolina	WITN-TV	1997	NBC; MyNet (DT2); MeTV (DT3)	
Wilmington	North Carolina	WECT	2019	NBC	
Wilmington	North Carolina	WSFX-TV	2019	Fox	
Wilmington	North Carolina	WTWL-LD	2022	Telemundo	
Bismarck	North Dakota	KFYR-TV	2014	NBC; Fox (DT2); MeTV (DT3)	
Dickinson	North Dakota	KQCD-TV	2014	NBC; Fox (DT2); MeTV (DT3)	(Note: Satellite of KFYR-TV.)
Fargo–Horace–Grand Forks	North Dakota	KVLY-TV	2014	NBC; CBS (DT2)	
Fargo–Horace–Grand Forks	North Dakota	KXJB-LD	2016	CBS; CW (LD2)	
Minot	North Dakota	KMOT	2014	NBC; Fox (DT2); MeTV (DT3)	(Note: Semi-satellite of KFYR-TV.)
Williston	North Dakota	KUMV-TV	2014	NBC; Fox (DT2); MeTV (DT3)	(Note: Satellite of KMOT.)
Cincinnati	Ohio	WXIX-TV	2019	Fox	
Cincinnati	Ohio	WBQC-LD	2022	Telemundo	
Cleveland–Shaker Heights–Lorain–Canton	Ohio	WTCL-LD	2021	Telemundo	
Cleveland–Shaker Heights–Lorain–Canton	Ohio	WOIO	2019	CBS	
Cleveland–Shaker Heights–Lorain–Canton	Ohio	WUAB	2019	MyNet	
Cleveland–Shaker Heights–Lorain–Canton	Ohio	WOHZ-CD	2021	Independent	
Lima	Ohio	WLIO	2026	NBC; Fox/MyNet (DT2)	
Lima	Ohio	WOHL-CD	2026	ABC; CBS (DT2)	
Lima	Ohio	WAMS-LD	2026	ABC; CBS (DT2)	(Note: Satellite of WOHL-CD.)
Lima	Ohio	WPNM-LD	2026	ABC; CBS (DT2)	
Toledo	Ohio	WTVG	2014	ABC; CW (DT2); MeTV (DT3)	
Toledo	Ohio	WFND-LD	2026	Buckeye Cable Sports Network	
Bend	Oregon	KUBN-LD	2021	MyNet	(Note: Semi-satellite of KPDX.)
Portland	Oregon	KPTV	2021	Fox	
Portland	Oregon	KPDX	2021	MyNet	
Charleston	South Carolina	WCSC-TV	2019	CBS	
Columbia	South Carolina	WIS	2019	NBC; CW (DT2)	
Greenville–Spartanburg–Anderson	South Carolina	WHNS	2021	Fox	
Greenville–Spartanburg–Anderson	South Carolina	WDKT-LD	2024	Telemundo	
Myrtle Beach–Florence	South Carolina	WMBF-TV	2019	NBC	
Myrtle Beach–Florence	South Carolina	WXIV-LD	2022	Telemundo	
Lead	South Dakota	KHSD	2014	ABC; Fox (7.1)	
Lead	South Dakota	KQME	2021	MeTV	(Note: Satellite of KHME.)
Mitchell	South Dakota	KDLV	2019	NBC; Fox (DT2); ABC (13.1)	(Note: Satellite of KDLT-TV.)
Pierre	South Dakota	KPRY-TV	2014	ABC; MeTV (DT3)	(Note: Satellite of KSFY-TV.)
Rapid City	South Dakota	KOTA-TV	2016	ABC; Fox (7.1)	
Rapid City	South Dakota	KEVN-LD	2015	Fox	
Rapid City	South Dakota	KHME	2021	MeTV	
Sioux Falls	South Dakota	KSFY-TV	2014	ABC; MeTV (DT3)	
Sioux Falls	South Dakota	KDLT-TV	2019	NBC; Fox (DT2)	
Chattanooga	Tennessee	WTVL-CD	2025	Telemundo	
Jackson	Tennessee	WBBJ-TV	2026	ABC; CBS (DT3); MeTV (DT4)	
Knoxville–Crossville	Tennessee	WVLT-TV	1996	CBS; MyNet (DT2)	
Knoxville–Crossville	Tennessee	WBXX-TV	2016	CW	
Memphis	Tennessee	WMC-TV	2019	NBC	
Memphis	Tennessee	WTME-LD	2022	Telemundo	
Nashville	Tennessee	WSMV-TV	2021	NBC	
Nashville	Tennessee	WTNX-LD	2021	Telemundo	
Amarillo–Borger	Texas	KFDA-TV	2019	CBS	
Amarillo–Borger	Texas	KZBZ-CD	2019	CBS	(Note: Translator of KFDA-TV.)
Amarillo–Borger	Texas	KEYU	2019	Telemundo	
Bryan–College Station	Texas	KBTX-TV	1999	CBS; CW (DT2); Telemundo (DT3)	(Note: Semi-satellite of KWTX-TV.)
Laredo	Texas	KGNS-TV	2013	NBC; ABC (DT2); Telemundo (DT3)	
Laredo	Texas	KXNU-CD	2019	Telemundo	
Laredo	Texas	KYLX-CD	2015	CBS; CW (LD2)	
Lubbock–Wolfforth–Snyder	Texas	KCBD	2019	NBC	
Lubbock–Wolfforth–Snyder	Texas	KMYL-LD	2020	MyNet	
Lubbock–Wolfforth–Snyder	Texas	KLCW-TV	2020	CW	
Lubbock–Wolfforth–Snyder	Texas	KJTV-CD	2026	Independent	
Lubbock–Wolfforth–Snyder	Texas	KJTV-TV	2026	Fox	
Lubbock–Wolfforth–Snyder	Texas	KABI-LD	2020	Heroes & Icons	
Lubbock–Wolfforth–Snyder	Texas	KXTQ-CD	2020	Telemundo	
Lubbock–Wolfforth–Snyder	Texas	KLBB-LD	2020	MeTV	
Lufkin–Nacogdoches	Texas	KTRE	2019	ABC; Telemundo (DT2)	(Note: Semi-satellite of KLTV.)
Odessa–Midland–Big Spring	Texas	KCWO-TV	2019	CW; Telemundo (DT2)	
Odessa–Midland–Big Spring	Texas	KOSA-TV	2015	CBS; CW (DT2); Telemundo (DT3)	
Odessa–Midland–Big Spring	Texas	KTLE-LD	2019	Telemundo	
Odessa–Midland–Big Spring	Texas	KMDF-LD	2020	365BLK	
Odessa–Midland–Big Spring	Texas	KWWT	2020	MyNet; MeTV (DT2)	
Sherman	Texas	KXII	1999	CBS; MyNet (DT2); Fox (DT3)	
Sherman	Texas	KAQI-LD	2022	Telemundo	
Tyler–Longview–Jacksonville	Texas	KLTV	2019	ABC; Telemundo (DT3)	
Waco–Belton–Temple–Killeen	Texas	KWTX-TV	1999	CBS; Telemundo (DT2); MeTV (DT3)	
Waco–Belton–Temple–Killeen	Texas	KNCT	2018	CW	
Wichita Falls	Texas	KAUZ-TV	2019	CBS; CW (DT2)	
Wichita Falls	Texas	KSWO-TV	2019	ABC; Telemundo (DT2); MeTV (DT2)	
Burlington	Vermont	WCAX-TV	2017	CBS	
Burlington	Vermont	WYCI	2019	MyNet	
Charlottesville	Virginia	WVIR-TV	2019	NBC; CW (DT3)	
Charlottesville	Virginia	WVIR-CD	2005	NBC; CW (CD3)	(Note: Translator of WVIR-TV.)
Harrisonburg	Virginia	WHSV-TV	2002	ABC; NBC (DT2); MeTV/MyNet (DT4); CBS (DT5)	
Harrisonburg	Virginia	WSVW-LD	2019	NBC; CW (LD3)	
Harrisonburg	Virginia	WSVF-CD	2012	Fox; CBS (CD2)	
Richmond–Ashland–Petersburg	Virginia	WWBT	2019	NBC; MeTV (DT2)	
Richmond–Ashland–Petersburg	Virginia	WRID-LD	2022	Daystar; NBC (12.6); CW (65.6)	(Note: Translator of WWBT and WUPV.)
Richmond–Ashland–Petersburg	Virginia	WUPV	2019	CW	
Roanoke–Danville–Lynchburg	Virginia	WDBJ	2016	CBS	
Roanoke–Danville–Lynchburg	Virginia	WZBJ	2018	MyNet	
Roanoke–Danville–Lynchburg	Virginia	WZBJ-CD	2018	MyNet	(Note: Translator of WZBJ.)
Bluefield–Beckley–Oak Hill	West Virginia	WVVA	2021	NBC; CW (DT2)	
Clarksburg–Weston–Fairmont	West Virginia	WDTV	2017	CBS; MeTV (DT2)	
Clarksburg–Weston–Fairmont	West Virginia	WVFX	2017	Fox; CW (DT2)	
Huntington–Charleston	West Virginia	WSAZ-TV	2005	NBC; MeTV/MyNet (DT2)	
Huntington–Charleston	West Virginia	WQCW	2014	CW	
Parkersburg	West Virginia	WTAP-TV	2002	NBC	
Parkersburg	West Virginia	WOVA-LD	2012	Fox; CW (LD2)	
Parkersburg	West Virginia	WIYE-LD	2012	CBS; MeTV/MyNet (LD2)	
Eau Claire–La Crosse	Wisconsin	WEAU	1998	NBC; MeTV (DT3)	
Eau Claire–La Crosse	Wisconsin	WECX-LD	2021	CW	
Green Bay	Wisconsin	WBAY-TV	2017	ABC	
Madison	Wisconsin	WMTV	2002	NBC; CW (DT2); MeTV (DT4)	
Wausau	Wisconsin	WSAW-TV	2002	CBS; MeTV/MyNet (DT2); Fox (DT3); CW (DT4)	
Wausau	Wisconsin	WZAW-LD	2015	Fox; MeTV (LD2); CW (LD6)	
Eagle River–Rhinelander	Wisconsin	WYOW	2021	CW; CBS (7.10); Fox (33.10)	(Note: Satellite of WSAW-TV.)
Sheridan	Wyoming	KSGW	2016	ABC; Fox (DT2)	(Note: Satellite of KOTA-TV.)

=== Radio ===
Media market	State	Station	Purchased	Current format
Quincy	Illinois	WGEM-FM	2021	Sports radio

== Former stations ==
Stations formerly owned by Gray Media
Media market	State	Station	Purchased	Sold	Notes
El Dorado	Arkansas	KTVE	1967	1996	
El Dorado	Arkansas	KAQY	2014	2014	(Note: Owned by Parker Broadcasting.)
Colorado Springs	Colorado	KKTV	2002	2026	
Grand Junction	Colorado	KKCO	2005	2026	
Grand Junction	Colorado	KJCT-CD	2013	2026	
Grand Junction	Colorado	KJCT	2013	2014	(Note: Owned by Excalibur Broadcasting.)
Albany	Georgia	WALB	1946	1960	(Note: Acquired by James H. Gray Sr. as part of his purchase of The Albany Herald.)
Albany	Georgia	WSWG	2005	2019	
Augusta	Georgia	WAGT	2016	2017	(Note: License cancelled on this date.)
Boise	Idaho	KNIN-TV	2019	2023	
Twin Falls	Idaho	KMVT	2015	2026	
Twin Falls	Idaho	KSVT-CD	2015	2026	
Freeport–Rockford	Illinois	WIFR	2002	2017	
Quincy	Illinois	WGEM	2021	2023	
Colby	Kansas	KLBY	2002	2016	(Note: Satellite of KAKE.)
Derby	Kansas	KDCU-DT	2016	2021	(Note: Owned by Entravision Communications.)
Garden City	Kansas	KUPK-TV	2002	2016	
Wichita	Kansas	KAKE	2002	2016	
Murray	Kentucky	WQTV-LP	2019	2021	
Flint–Saginaw	Michigan	WJRT-TV	2014	2021	
Springfield	Missouri	KSPR	2015	2017	(Note: Owned by Schurz Communications.)
Helena	Montana	KMTF	2014	2015	
Helena	Montana	KTVH-DT	2014	2015	
Sidney–Scottsbluff	Nebraska	KNEP	2016	2024	
Fargo	North Dakota	KXJB-TV	2014	2014	
Aberdeen	South Dakota	KABY-TV	2014	2018	(Note: Satellite of KSFY-TV.)
Amarillo	Texas	KEYU-FM	2019	2019	
Odessa–Midland	Texas	KTXC	2019	2022	
Charlottesville	Virginia	WVAW-LD	2002	2019	
Charlottesville	Virginia	WCAV **	2004	2019	
Winchester	Virginia	TV3 Winchester	2007	2013	(Note: Cable-only joint operation between WHSV-TV and Shenandoah University; also simulcast on WHSV-DT3.)
Casper	Wyoming	KCWY	2013	2024	
Cheyenne	Wyoming	KGWN-TV	2013	2024	
