= 2021 notable events in American television =

The following is a list of notable events in American television in 2021.

== January ==
Date	Event	Source
5	Caillou is dropped by PBS Kids after 20 years, as they lost the rights to air the series. The show, which had not aired any new episodes since 2011, attracts widespread online celebration from critics of the show.	
6	Due to news coverage of the attack on the U.S. Capitol in Washington, D.C., broadcast networks ABC, CBS and NBC swap their primetime schedule for continuing news coverage. The preempted programmes are celebrity editions of Who Wants to Be a Millionaire on ABC, repeats of SEAL Team and S.W.A.T. on CBS, and new episodes of Chicago Med, Chicago Fire and Chicago P.D on NBC, while Fox carrys its normal lineup, which features the second episode of The Masked Dancer and the premiere of a new version of Name That Tune.	
7	Morning Joe on MSNBC airs a powerful opening, featuring startling images of the U.S. Capitol attack against the Johnny Cash song “Hurt.”. During the show, co-host Joe Scarborough made an impassioned speech about the level of policing during the riot, later dropping a F-bomb live on air as he called for the arrests of Donald Trump, Donald Trump Jr., and Rudy Giuliani for their roles in inciting the attack. The opening was later removed from the show's Twitter page.	
8	Jeopardy! airs the final episode (pushed back from Christmas Day) of Alex Trebek's hosting tenure, recorded 10 days before his November 8, 2020, death from stage IV pancreatic cancer. Starting with the January 11 episode and for the rest of the season, a series of guest hosts, the first being highest-winning Jeopardy! champion Ken Jennings, fill in at the host lectern Trebek had occupied for 36 years.	
10	While sister network CBS airs an NFL playoff between the Chicago Bears and New Orleans Saints, Nickelodeon airs a special children-oriented version of the game. The broadcast added classic Nickelodeon gags such as CGI-created slime cannons "spraying" the end zones after touchdowns; prerecorded explanations of penalties, offered by Young Sheldon star Iain Armitage; and announcer and former NFL star Nate Burleson analogizing successful plays with such childhood activities as staying in school. Although Nickelodeon's broadcast was aimed at younger, new-to-football viewers, it was reportedly enjoyed more so by Generation X and millennial parents who grew up watching the channel in its 1980s/1990s heyday.	
10	The 1st Critics' Choice Super Awards, an event honoring films in the science fiction, action, horror and superhero genres, airs on The CW. The virtual ceremony saw The Boys as the top winner with four awards (including "Best Superhero Series").	
22	Tom Brokaw announces his retirement from NBC News. A special correspondent and commentator since ending a 22-year run as Nightly News anchor in 2004, Brokaw spent 55 years with NBC, including roles as anchor/reporter at O&O KNBC/Los Angeles, White House correspondent, co-anchor of Today, and interim moderator (after Tim Russert's 2008 death) of Meet The Press.	
23	Food Network pulls all content related to season 20 of Worst Cooks in America (which aired in Summer 2020) from its linear, streaming and social platforms (including discovery+), after season winner Ariel Robinson and her husband, Austin Robinson, were charged in the January 14 death of their adopted three-year-old daughter at their Simpsonville, South Carolina, home. Ariel Robinson would be convicted and sentenced to life in prison for homicide by child abuse in May 2022, one month after Austin had pleaded guilty to aiding and abetting in the killing.	
25	Two top executives of the CBS Television Stations group, division president Peter Dunn and Senior VP/News David Friend, are placed on administrative leave after a Los Angeles Times investigation reveals, among other allegations, their discriminatory and disparaging behavior concerning Black and female news employees at the station level, in particular at KYW-TV/Philadelphia. CBS would commission a third-party investigation into the matter and the broad culture within the station division; by the time it concludes in July, both Dunn and Friend would depart CBS (on April 7), and the general managers at CBS stations in Chicago (WBBM-TV) and Los Angeles (KCBS-TV/KCAL-TV) would be dismissed.	

== February ==
Date	Event	Source
1	Gray Television announces its intent to acquire Quincy Media's broadcasting properties for $925 million. The deal—which was completed on August 2—saw Gray acquire eleven television (and two radio) stations, which was to have expanded its portfolio to 198 TV outlets in 102 markets with a collective reach of 25.4% of U.S. television households (as estimated prior to Gray's purchase of 16 additional stations from Meredith Local Media, see May 3 entry). The expanded portfolio would not include stations Gray had to divest to alleviate market conflicts with existing Gray properties (see April 29 entry). Quincy's newspaper holdings were sold to Phillips Media Group in a separate transaction announced on February 13.	
1	Marilyn Manson is dropped from future episodes of American Gods and Creepshow due to multiple abuse allegations against him. The following day, Creative Artists Agency announced that it had dropped Manson as a client.	
3	Country music channel CMT joins numerous country radio stations, including those owned by Cumulus Media and iHeartMedia among others, in pulling Morgan Wallen's music from its video library after he was captured on video saying a racial slur that was posted by TMZ. In addition, he was dropped from his record labels, Big Loud and Republic Records along with being pulled from consideration for the Academy of Country Music Awards.	
5	Fox Business cancels Lou Dobbs Tonight, the network's highest-rated show. The cancellation came one day after its host, Lou Dobbs, was one of several Fox hosts – and Fox itself – were sued for $2.7 billion by electronic voting system producer Smartmatic for defamation, regarding Dobbs and others' role in spreading conspiracy theories about the 2020 United States presidential election. Fox News hosts Maria Bartiromo and Jeanine Pirro and frequent Fox News guests and ex-President Donald Trump's former lawyers Rudy Giuliani and Sidney Powell were also named in the suit.	
7	The Tampa Bay Buccaneers defeat the Kansas City Chiefs to win Super Bowl LV and become the first team to win the championship game in their home stadium. The game aired on CBS in English and ESPN Deportes in Spanish. The game was watched by 90.8 million people on linear television and another 5.6 million people on streaming platforms. It was the smallest audience since Super Bowl XXXIX in 2005.	
10	Gina Carano is fired from The Mandalorian due to her controversial social media posts, with Lucasfilm announcing that they are ending their relationship with her. Carano is also dropped by United Talent Agency as a client.	
24	NBC pulls from digital distribution an episode of the medical drama Nurses that aired on the network on February 9. Titled "Achilles Heel," a plotline in the episode features an Orthodox Jewish patient and his father objecting to a bone graft from a cadaver to treat a leg injury; the characters' depiction received criticism from Jewish rights groups for "demonizing" those of the Jewish faith, and of the ethical quandary presented in the plot being completely fictional. The episode of the Canadian-produced Nurses had already aired in that country in February 2020 (host network Global would follow NBC's suit in pulling "Achilles Heel" from its own digital platforms).	
28	The 78th Golden Globe Awards aired on NBC with Tina Fey and Amy Poehler as the hosts. The COVID-19 pandemic moved it from its usual first Sunday of January berth, along with film awards season in general. Jane Fonda was honored with the Golden Globe Cecil B. DeMille Award. Norman Lear was honored with the Carol Burnett Award. This was the first Golden Globe Awards ceremony to go bicoastal with Fey co-hosting from the Rainbow Room in New York City, and Poehler co-hosting from The Beverly Hilton in Beverly Hills, California.	

== March ==
Date	Event	Source
7	TV series Ted Lasso and The Crown and the motion picture Nomadland are among notable winners at the 26th Critics' Choice Awards. The event aired on The CW, with Taye Diggs hosting for the third consecutive year.	
7	In a two-hour special airing on CBS, Harry and Meghan, the Duke and Duchess of Sussex, talk with Oprah Winfrey about their separation as working members of, and relationships with, the British royal family.	
10	The National Hockey League announces a new seven-year deal with ESPN, covering the 2021–22 through 2027–28 seasons. The deal includes 25 games each season on ESPN or ABC; 75 games on ESPN+ (which replaces NHL.tv as the league's out-of-market streaming home); exclusive rights to the All-Star Game and Skills Competition; and half of the Stanley Cup Playoffs each season, including four Stanley Cup Final series exclusively. The deal marks a reunion of the NHL with ESPN, which last carried the league in 2003–04, forming one half of a two-carrier deal with the league (see April 26 entry).	
10	The Talk co-hosts Sharon Osbourne and Sheryl Underwood get into a heated on-air discussion over Osbourne's defense of Piers Morgan, who came under fire in Great Britain for dismissing Meghan, Duchess of Sussex's talk about her mental health during her March 7 interview with Oprah Winfrey (and would storm off ITV's Good Morning Britain on March 8, resigning from that show a day later). Osbourne would state on Twitter that her defense of Morgan was not meant to be racially motivated, and that she had been blindsided by The Talk producers into having the conversation. It leads to CBS launching an internal review of the incident and The Talk suspending production on March 15, initially for two days but eventually extended (see March 26).	
12	WLS-TV/Chicago and sports anchor Mark Giangreco announced they have come to a separation agreement. A long-time Chicago TV/radio personality (and a 27-year veteran of the ABC O&O), Giangreco had been on administrative leave since a January 28 newscast in which, while presenting a video of a house being painted by a hockey player on roller skates, he equated fellow anchor Cheryl Burton to a "ditzy, combative interior decorator" of a hypothetical DIY Network home improvement show, with Burton asking for some kind of action to be taken after he had done the same previously.	
13	The 2021 Kids' Choice Awards air on Nickelodeon with simulcasts on TeenNick, Nicktoons and the Nick Jr. Channel; Kenan Thompson served as the host, and Justin Bieber was the headlining performer. Television winners included Alexa & Katie (for "Favorite Kids' TV Show"), Stranger Things (for "Favorite Family TV Show"), Jace Norman (of Henry Danger for "Favorite Male TV Star"), Millie Bobby Brown (of Stranger Things for "Favorite Female TV Star"), America's Got Talent (for "Favorite Reality Show") and SpongeBob SquarePants (for "Favorite Animated Series"). The broadcast resulted in the setting of two Guinness World Records: for the Most People Gunged/Slimed Simultaneously Online (with 195 participants) and Most Nickelodeon Kids' Choice Awards Won by a Music Group (BTS, who won three awards, joining their two prior wins, respectively, in 2018 and 2020).	
14	The 63rd Grammy Awards air on CBS with Trevor Noah as the host. The awards were originally scheduled to be held on January 31, but were moved to March after Los Angeles County began experiencing a surge in COVID-19 hospitalizations.	
18	The National Football League announces new TV deals covering the 2023 through 2033 seasons. The deals ensure Sunday afternoon broadcasts remain on CBS and Fox, keeps Sunday Night Football on NBC, and gives Amazon Prime Video exclusive rights to Thursday Night Football (transferring it from Fox and NFL Network). It also expands ESPN's Monday Night Football presence to include doubleheader games with ABC; late-season flex scheduling of more compelling games; and ABC/ESPN simulcasts of two Super Bowls.	
18	Nischelle Turner is named the new co-anchor of Entertainment Tonight, becoming the first Black woman to host the 40-year-old showbiz newsmagazine.	
22	NBC's The Tonight Show Starring Jimmy Fallon brings in a limited, socially distanced, and fully-masked live audience to its regular home at Studio 6B of 30 Rockefeller Plaza; sidekick/announcer Steve Higgins also returns to the studio (he had been recording Tonight's intros from home), as well as the return of the show's pre-pandemic opening theme and street-side intro, albeit with special edits featuring host Jimmy Fallon and house band The Roots wearing masks (the original mask-free intro would return in May after the CDC's guidelines were updated). Prior to returning to 6B (which would bring back a full audience on June 7), Tonight had spent the pandemic either "at home" or in temporary audience-free space at Studio 6A in the 12 months before this evening's episode.	
24	Warner Bros. Television fires All Rise executive producer Greg Spottiswood in the wake of an internal investigation over his alleged use of offensive remarks and other insensitive actions in the CBS legal drama's writers' room. It is the second such incident involving Spottiswood at All Rise; the first, in late 2019, resulted in five writers leaving the show, and a corporate coach (a Black woman) being brought in, after the writers clashed with Spottiswood (who is white) over the show's depiction of gender and race, specifically people of color.	
25	Dick Stockton announces his retirement after a 55-year sportscasting career, most notably covering the NFL, NBA, Major League Baseball, and the Winter Olympics for Fox, CBS, and Turner Sports, as well as local broadcasts of the Boston Red Sox and Oakland Athletics.	
26	After The Talk's hiatus is extended past March 16, when reports surfaced that former co-hosts Leah Remini and Holly Robinson Peete accused Sharon Osbourne of saying racist and homophobic slurs about Robinson Peete and fellow former panelists Julie Chen Moonves and Sara Gilbert, CBS finishes its review of the March 10 on-air incident, stating that Osbourne's actions "did not align with our values for a respectful workplace," and that Osbourne (the last remaining member of The Talk's original 2010 host panel) would not return to the show. The Talk would eventually return to air on April 12, when the show's remaining panelists sat down to discuss the incident and their reactions.	
27	The 52nd NAACP Image Awards are aired on BET and other Viacom networks with Anthony Anderson hosting.	
31	T-Mobile US announces the shutdown of its fledgling vMVPD service TVision, effective April 29. Launched in November 2020 as a streaming-only version of the wired TVision Home IPTV service (launched in 2019), TVision saw early criticism from Discovery Inc., ViacomCBS and NBCUniversal for, without their prior input and running afoul of channel bundling obligations set under their carriage deals, excluding certain networks they each own from the provider's higher-end "Live" packages despite having included them in its discount "Vibe" tier. Existing TVision subscribers were offered $10/month discounts off of either Philo or YouTube TV's respective base packages due to the closure. (Prior to the announcement, TVision had intended to begin selling its packages to customers outside of T-Mobile's consumer base by the end of 2021.)	

== April ==
Date	Event	Source
1	Dish Network and Sling TV drop MASN (home of Major League Baseball's Baltimore Orioles and Washington Nationals), on the first day of the 2021 Major League Baseball season, due to a carriage dispute. Additionally, the providers drop NBC Sports Washington (home of the Washington Wizards and Washington Capitals); NBC Sports California (home of the Oakland Athletics, San Jose Sharks, and Sacramento Kings); and NBC Sports Bay Area (home of the San Francisco Giants and Golden State Warriors) for the same reason.	
1	Former Williamson County, Texas, sheriff Robert Chody turns himself in to authorities in neighboring Travis County on charges of evidence tampering for ordering the destruction of video footage, captured by Live PD, during a 2019 traffic stop that ended in the killing of Javier Ambler. It is the second time Chody is indicted for the crime (Williamson County charged him in September 2020), and it comes two days after Travis County charged two of his former deputies with manslaughter for their role in the incident.	
13	American Spanish-language broadcaster Univision Communications and Mexico-based Televisa announce the combining of their respective entertainment assets into one company, to be known as Televisa-Univision. The $4.8 billion deal would result in Univision, UniMás and their respective O&Os as well as the company's cable properties (including Galavisión, Fusion TV and TUDN) being united under one company with the Televisa entertainment assets that Univision has long relied on to supply programming. Fusion however would close at year's end.	
14	ABC News taps Kimberly Godwin as its new president, set to succeed outgoing chief James Goldston. A veteran of local and network news operations (including the last 14 years at CBS News), Godwin becomes the first Black executive to lead a broadcast news operation upon joining ABC News the following month.	
18	The 56th Academy of Country Music Awards aired on CBS from three locations in Nashville: the Grand Ole Opry House, the Ryman Auditorium, and the Bluebird Café. Keith Urban and Mickey Guyton (who became the first African-American woman to serve as host) were the hosts for the telecast. Luke Bryan won "Entertainer of the Year" and Chris Stapleton (for Starting Over) won "Album of the Year"; Maren Morris, Carly Pearce and Lee Brice won the most awards during the event, earning two each.	
25	The 93rd Academy Awards aired on ABC. Originally scheduled to be held on February 28, it was moved to April 25, the latest scheduled date for the ceremony in its history. The ceremony was presented from two locations in Hollywood: the Dolby Theatre and the Union Station. Nomadland earned the most wins with three awards: "Best Picture", "Best Director" (for Chloé Zhao, who became the first woman of color and the second woman overall to win in the category), and "Best Actress" (for Frances McDormand, who became the seventh person and fourth actress ever to win three acting Oscars over their career). Anthony Hopkins' "Best Actor" win for The Father (which, at 83, made him the oldest winner in an acting category) sparked some criticism as many viewers believed that the ceremony's producers broke with tradition in moving the lead acting categories to be presented after the "Best Picture" winner presentation on assumption that Chadwick Boseman (nominated for Ma Rainey's Black Bottom) would receive a posthumous "Best Actor" award in tribute.	
26	The National Hockey League announces a new seven-year deal with Turner Sports, covering the 2021–22 through 2027–28 seasons. The "'B' package" with Turner (the ESPN/ABC deal announced on March 10 has been termed the "'A' package") sees TBS and/or TNT carry up to 72 regular season games each season; the New Year's Day Winter Classic; half of the Stanley Cup Playoffs each season; three Stanley Cup Final series exclusively on TNT; and live streaming and simulcast rights for HBO Max (which, alongside ESPN+, replaces NHL.tv as the league's out-of-market streaming home), marking the service's entry into live programming. The Turner and ESPN/ABC deals mean that NBC Sports' relationship with the NHL (one that dated to the 2005–06 season) would conclude at the end of the truncated 2021 season (see July 7), this after NBC pulled out of negotiations for the partial contractual rights.	
27	Contestant Laura Trammell wins $398,690 in cash and prizes (including a Latitude Margaritaville house worth $375,000) during that evening's episode of Wheel of Fortune, making her the fourth biggest winner in the show's history (and the biggest outside of three other $1 million winners); it is also the expensive non-grand prize win outside the $100,000 grand prize, since a Winnebago Intent was offered and won in a 2019 episode. For the week of April 26–30, a special wedge was added to the wheel which allowed a contestant to add a second Latitude Margaritaville house envelope in the bonus round, similar to the Million Dollar Wedge (which was intact in the contestant's possession and is susceptible to any bankrupt wedge hits). It is also the third week to feature a collaboration between Margaritaville and Wheel, after previous sponsorships in 2018 and 2019.	
29	Nearly three months after announcing its intent to acquire Quincy Media's broadcast properties (see February 1 entry), Gray Television announces it will sell seven Quincy-owned stations (including corresponding satellites belonging to four ABC affiliates) to Allen Media Broadcasting to address local cross-ownership conflicts with existing Gray properties. The $380-million deal results in the Entertainment Studios unit acquiring NBC affiliates KVOA/Tucson, KWWL/Cedar Rapids and WREX/Rockford, and ABC affiliates WKOW/Madison, WXOW/La Crosse, WAOW/Wausau and WSIL/Paducah.	
30	The CW removes the British police procedural Bulletproof (which has aired on the network since 2019, under license from distributor Sky Vision) from its streaming platforms following an April 29 report in The Guardian detailing accusations of misconduct against star Noel Clarke from 20 women, in which he was accused of sexual harassment, unwanted groping, bullying, making inappropriate on-set comments, and sharing sexually explicit photos and videos without consent. Clarke has denied the allegations except for those pertaining to inappropriate comments he admits to have made about one of the women.	

== May ==
Date	Event	Source
3	Gray Television announces its acquisition of the Meredith Local Media broadcasting unit from the Meredith Corporation for $2.7 billion. (Meredith would concurrently spin off its print/digital unit to current company shareholders.) The deal, upon its completion on December 1, resulted in Gray adding 16 stations in 11 markets to the company's portfolio, as well as making Gray the third-largest TV station group in the U.S. (behind Nexstar Media Group and Sinclair Broadcast Group), with 101 stations serving 113 markets that reach 36% of U.S. households (or 25% when factoring in the UHF discount). (See also July 14, concerning the sole station spin-off associated with the deal.)	
3	Two months after awarding Thursday Night Football rights to Amazon Prime Video (see March 18 entry), the National Football League announces the streamer's exclusive commitment to the package will begin one season earlier than announced, from 2023 to 2022. The move means that 2021 is the last season TNF will be available on over-the-air (Fox) and conventional cable (NFL Network) services, outside of broadcast stations in the competing teams' home markets.	
10	Believing that the Hollywood Foreign Press Association needs ample time to properly execute organizational and membership reforms (including initial changes approved on May 6), NBC announces it would not air the HFPA's Golden Globe Awards ceremony in January 2022. It is one of several stands (and boycotts) taken by studios, talent, agents, and PR firms against the HFPA in light of recent reports about its lack of membership diversity, as well as its long history of insular culture, suspect financial practices, and other questionable conduct.	
10	Calling himself a "salary cap casualty," Kenny Mayne announces his departure from ESPN after 27 years as an anchor and correspondent for the sports network; his last on-screen appearance occurs on May 24.	
13	HBO cancels taping of the May 14 episode of Real Time with Bill Maher (scheduled to feature Neil deGrasse Tyson as the interview guest, and Max Brooks and Dan Carlin as panelists) after the comedian/political satirist tests positive for COVID-19, with Maher being asymptomatic, following weekly PCR testing for the disease conducted by the premium channel ahead of the scheduled broadcast. Maher is one of several rare "breakthrough" COVID-19 cases that occurred despite prior vaccination. (HBO aired reruns of Real Time and Mare of Easttown, respectively, in place of the canceled May 14 and May 21 episodes.) Maher returned to the program on May 28.	
16– 17	The 2021 MTV Movie & TV Awards aired on MTV (and simulcast on ViacomCBS-owned sister channels including Nick at Nite, BET, Comedy Central, TV Land and Paramount Network) with Leslie Jones as the host. The ceremony, held at the Hollywood Palladium, saw Sacha Baron Cohen be honored with the Comedic Genius Award and Scarlett Johansson honored with the MTV Generation Award. Among television nominees, WandaVision earned the most accolades with four awards (including Best Performance in a Show and co-lead Elizabeth Olsen for Best Show). It is also the first telecast to be split over two nights: the second night (on May 17) marked the inaugural edition of MTV Movie & TV Awards: Unscripted, a ceremony devoted exclusively to awards in reality television. (In addition to airing on MTV, the event was simulcast on MTV2, VH1 and CMT.) The ceremony, hosted by Nikki Glaser, saw RuPaul's Drag Race earn the most wins with three awards (including Best Competition Series and RuPaul for Best Host).	
17	AT&T and Discovery, Inc. reach a definitive agreement to combine the respective media assets of WarnerMedia (such as HBO, HBO Max, Warner Bros., CNN, TBS and a 50% share of The CW) and Discovery (such as Discovery Channel, Discovery+, Food Network, HGTV and TLC) in a cash/securities/stock deal worth $43 billion, plus WarnerMedia's retention of certain debt. The deal is structured as a Reverse Morris Trust, as AT&T would spin out WarnerMedia into an independent company (unwinding its $85-billion 2017 acquisition of the former Time Warner) that concurrently acquires Discovery. Closed on April 8, 2022, AT&T shareholders own 71% of the company and Discovery shareholders own the remaining 29% share, with each shareholder group appointing representative board members; Discovery President/CEO David Zaslav leads the new company, taking over from WarnerMedia CEO Jason Kilar, who would depart.	
18–22	The 2021 Eurovision Song Contest (held at Rotterdam Ahoy in Rotterdam, Netherlands) airs live on Peacock, with the semi-finals airing on May 18 and May 20, and the final (in which Italy won with Måneskin's "Zitti e buoni") airing on May 22. It marked the first time that an entire Eurovision Song Contest event (both semi-finals and the final) have been carried live-to-air on a U.S. television service.	
22	CNN terminates its contract with political commentator and former politician Rick Santorum in response to racist and historically inaccurate comments he made about Native Americans at an event in April.	
23	The 2021 Billboard Music Awards air on NBC from the Microsoft Theater, with Nick Jonas as the host. The Weeknd won 10 awards from among his 16 nominations, including for Top Artist, Top Male Artist, Top R&B Artist, Top R&B Album (for After Hours) and Top Hot 100 Song (for "Blinding Lights").	
23	HBO's Last Week Tonight with John Oliver airs a segment on the practice of local television stations featuring sponsored content on newscasts and daytime advertorial lifestyle programming (and its impact on journalistic integrity). During the segment, host John Oliver revealed that the show had created a fake product, the "Venus Veil" (a regular blanket that it intentionally deceptively marketed as "the world's first sexual wellness blanket"), and hired an actress to pitch the product on three unsuspecting stations, KTVX/Salt Lake City, KVUE/Austin and KMGH-TV/Denver (all ABC affiliates).	
26	Juan Williams announces he will depart from the host panel of Fox News Channel's The Five rather than commute between his Washington, D.C., home and Fox News' New York City studios, where the show would return to production on June 1. Williams, who had been with The Five since its launch in 2011, remains with Fox as a Washington-based senior political analyst.	
26	In light of the 2019 killing of Javier Ambler that was filmed by Live PD's cameras, Texas governor Greg Abbott signs into law the first statewide measure in the U.S. (a bill named in Ambler's memory) that prohibits law enforcement agencies from authorizing TV crews to film on-duty officers "for the purpose of creating a reality television show". The bill, authored by Democratic State Representative James Talarico (whose district includes Williamson County, where Ambler was killed), had passed with near-unanimous support in both houses of the Texas Legislature.	
27	HBO Max, which marked the one-year anniversary of its launch on this date, releases Friends: The Reunion, a special reuniting the main cast of the 1994–2004 NBC sitcom (Jennifer Aniston, Courteney Cox, Lisa Kudrow, Matt LeBlanc, Matthew Perry, and David Schwimmer). Moderated by James Corden, it featured taped and in-person guest appearances from former guest stars (such as Tom Selleck, Elliott Gould, James Michael Tyler [in one of his last appearances before his death from metastatic prostate and spinal cancer on October 24], and Reese Witherspoon) and celebrity fans (such as David Beckham, Justin Bieber, Cindy Crawford, and Lady Gaga). Filming of the special – which was recorded in front of a studio audience at the sitcom's former Stage 24 at Warner Bros. Studios, Burbank – took place in April, after having been delayed twice in 2020 due to the COVID-19 pandemic.	
27	The 2021 iHeartRadio Music Awards air on Fox from Hollywood's Dolby Theatre, one year after the 2020 ceremony was canceled due to the COVID-19 pandemic (its winners were announced through a virtual press conference). Usher serves as host, with Elton John (recipient of the iHeartRadio Icon Award) among the honorees.	
28	Longtime KSAT/San Antonio reporter Paul Venema retires from the Graham Media Group-owned ABC affiliate after 47 years.	

== June ==
Date	Event	Source
3	The internal networks of Cox Media Group's television and radio stations are struck by what is described as a ransomware attack. The IT incident disrupts the stations' online streams; forces employees to use personal devices for communication instead of company-owned computers and phones; and impacts the production of live news broadcasts, including the pre-emption of full newscasts on at least one of Cox's television stations (WSB-TV/Atlanta).	
7	Chris Harrison reaches a non-disclosure agreement with ABC and Warner Horizon Unscripted Television to end his 19-year run as host (and co-executive producer) of The Bachelor franchise. Harrison had been taking a sabbatical from its various series following a controversial February 9 Extra interview, in which he defended Season 25 contestant Rachael Kirkconnell during a discussion with former contestant Rachel Lindsay concerning photos of Kirkconnell at a 2018 Antebellum South plantation-themed fraternity formal, and accusations she liked racist social media posts and had bullied a high school classmate for dating Black men. (Guest hosts were slated for all scheduled 2021 editions of the franchise – including Season 17 of The Bachelorette, which premiered the night prior – starting with the Season 25 edition of The Bachelor: After the Final Rose.) On September 28, ESPN college football analyst Jesse Palmer—who starred in the flagship series’ fifth season in 2004—was named host of The Bachelor effective with the 26th season in January 2022.	
7	GAC Media, a newly incorporated holding company co-founded by Hicks Equity Partners and former Crown Media Family Networks CEO William J. Abbott, announces it had reached separate agreements to acquire Great American Country from Discovery, Inc. and equestrian sports-focused Ride TV from Ride Television Network, Inc. for undisclosed prices. Abbott becomes GAC Media's president and CEO.	
9	The 2021 CMT Music Awards were aired with Kelsea Ballerini and Kane Brown hosting.	
14	For the first time since the COVID-19 pandemic began, CBS' The Late Show with Stephen Colbert broadcasts before a live audience at New York's Ed Sullivan Theater, with Jon Stewart as Colbert's primary in-studio guest. The show is adhering to New York state's adoption of CDC guidelines, including audience members proving full vaccination, optional wearing of face masks, daily testing and screening of staff, and a compliance officer monitoring and enforcing all safety protocols. In the 15 months before this broadcast, Late Show originated from either Colbert's home or within the confines of a closet-sized studio above the Sullivan.	
24	TBS' Conan airs an extended (even for its original format) final episode that features guest appearances by Jack Black (in-studio) and Will Ferrell (via Zoom), an animated cold open "exit interview" with Homer Simpson, and clip packages from previous episodes. The finale marks host Conan O'Brien's departure from late-night TV; his 28 years working on Conan and NBC's The Tonight Show and Late Night trail only the 33 and 30 years respectively spent by David Letterman and Johnny Carson in the daypart.	
25	The 48th Daytime Emmy Awards air on CBS, with Sheryl Underwood serving as host and notable winners including General Hospital (Outstanding Drama Series) and Jeopardy! (Outstanding Game Show), as well as posthumous wins for Larry King (Outstanding Informative Talk Show Host) and Jeopardy!'s Alex Trebek (Outstanding Game Show Host).	
27	The 21st BET Awards are aired from the Microsoft Theater with Taraji P. Henson hosting.	

== July ==
Date	Event	Source
3	With TNT's broadcast of the Milwaukee Bucks' NBA Eastern Conference-winning victory over the Atlanta Hawks, Marv Albert heads into retirement, closing out a sports announcing career that dates back to the 1960s and included TV work covering NBA, NFL, NHL, boxing, and Olympic coverage for Turner Sports, NBC, and CBS, as well as local teams including the New York Knicks.	
7	The Tampa Bay Lightning defeat the Montreal Canadiens 1–0 in game five of the 2021 Stanley Cup Final to win their second consecutive and third overall championship in franchise history. This game also marked the final NHL broadcast for NBC Sports after 16 seasons, with ESPN/ABC and Turner Sports becoming the new U.S. NHL broadcasters starting with the 2021-22 season. Game 5 attracted 3.6 million viewers and the series averaged 2.52 million viewers overall for NBC.	
10	The 2021 ESPY Awards are aired with Anthony Mackie hosting.	
13	All remaining analog television stations, as mandated by the FCC, shut off their analog signals and broadcast only in digital. This transition comes twelve years and one month after the digital transition for full-power television stations in 2009; only existing low-power broadcasters have been allowed to broadcast in analog since then. The few remaining analog low-power stations are mostly distant rural translators in large geographical television markets and a few urban-area stations operating primarily as radio stations on 87.7 FM; digital television is incompatible with either digital or analog radio, which forces the 87.7 stations to change frequencies or cease their radio operations altogether.	
14	The Talk announces that frequent guest panelist Jerry O'Connell (who had been recurring on the program since May, when the series began employing a rotation of male guest hosts) would join the CBS daytime show in September as a permanent panelist, the first male to join what had been an all-female panel throughout its 11-year history.	
14	Gray Television announces it will sell its ABC affiliate in the Central Michigan market, WJRT-TV/Flint, to Allen Media Broadcasting. The $70 million deal—which closes on September 23, prior to the closure of the Gray-Meredith deal—resolves the only single-market overlap created by Gray's pending acquisition of Meredith Corporation's broadcast assets (see May 3 entry), and allows Gray to keep another "top-four-ranked" station in the market, Meredith-owned CBS affiliate WNEM-TV/Bay City.	
16	In a surprise on-air announcement, Kasie Hunt announces her departure from NBC News and MSNBC, where she has hosted MSNBC's early morning program Way Too Early since its revival in 2020 which continued with rotating guest hosts in the interim(see October 25 entry).	
20	The Milwaukee Bucks defeat the Phoenix Suns 105–98 in Game 6 of the 2021 NBA Finals to win their second overall championship. This ends the city's 50-year championship drought dating back to 1971.	
23–August 8	The 2020 Summer Olympics in Tokyo, Japan, take place after their one-year postponement was made on March 24, 2020, due to the COVID-19 pandemic in Japan. NBC and its cable networks carry coverage in the United States. (NBCSN offered event coverage for the last time as it was scheduled to close at the end of the year; see "Networks and Services" below for details.) Although the International Olympic Committee stated it would be held as scheduled, postponement of the Summer Olympics to the following year was made in March 2020. The new opening/closing ceremony date range was announced on March 30, 2020.	
28	Big 12 Conference Commissioner Bob Bowlsby issues a cease-and-desist letter to ESPN, demanding the network end correspondence with the conference's member schools and other NCAA Division I conferences and accusing ESPN—without providing evidence—of having "actively engaged" in discussions with the SEC and American Athletic Conference about approaching Big 12 members for membership in those conferences to "destabilize the Big 12" and allow the universities of Oklahoma and Texas (which informed the Big 12 two days earlier that they will not renew their grant of media rights after the 2024–25 academic year, intending to join the SEC in 2025–26, an invitation approved by that conference the day after the letter's release) to avoid having to make buyout payments should the Big 12 fold. (ESPN maintains television and streaming rights to all three NCAA conferences.) Representatives for ESPN dismissed Bowlsby's claims as having "no merit."	
29	Ending a 33-month-long retransmission dispute, Dish Network and Home Box Office, Inc. reach an agreement that allows the satellite provider to resume distribution of HBO and Cinemax (offering five of seven HBO and three of eight Cinemax linear channels, not counting West Coast versions of their primary feeds that were also added, plus SVOD content from both networks), as well as offer access to HBO Max for the first time. (Dish concurrently offered customers a 20% discount on HBO Max's ad-free tier through October 27.) Dish Network and Sling TV dropped HBO and Cinemax in October 2018, which Dish blamed on AT&T (owner of HBO parent WarnerMedia) leveraging its ownership of HBO to help boost Dish rival DirecTV. (Sling TV is not included in the Dish/HBO carriage agreement.)	
30	Ramar Communications reaches an agreement to sell its television station cluster in the Albuquerque market—Telemundo affiliate KASA-TV and its network of repeaters (KTEL-CD and its Carlsbad satellite KTEL-TV, and 40 low-power translators), MeTV affiliate KRTN-LD (and its Durango, Colorado, satellite KRTN-TV), Movies! affiliate KUPT-LD, and Heroes & Icons affiliate KUPT/Hobbs—to Telemundo Station Group for $12.5 million. The sale will result in KASA becoming a Telemundo O&O (resulting in Telemundo parent NBCUniversal obtaining its 31st O&O market for the Spanish-language network), though it is unclear if the KRTN and KUPT stations will be spun off to a separate buyer or converted into repeaters of KASA. It will also mark Ramar's exit from television broadcasting, after having previously sold its Lubbock television cluster (led by Fox affiliate KJTV-TV, CW affiliate KLCW-TV, and MyNetworkTV affiliate KMYL-LD) to Gray Television (owner of local NBC affiliate KCBD) and SagamoreHill Broadcasting in October 2020; the company will retain ownership of its eight-station radio cluster in Lubbock.	
30	Waypoint Media announces its intent to exit broadcasting with the sale of its television stations and its centralized News Hub to Coastal Television Broadcast Group. It is Waypoint's second attempt to sell the stations, after a previously announced sale to Standard Media collapsed earlier in the year. Both Coastal and Waypoint own stations mostly in small cities and rural areas of the United States; Waypoint's owners stated that consolidation into a larger media company was a necessity to achieve the economy of scale to survive in the modern American media landscape and had previously divested its other broadcast assets to HC2 Holdings, Family Life Ministries and Seven Mountains Media over the course of the late 2010s and early 2020s.	

== August ==
Date	Event	Source
8	ABC airs an exclusive special edition of ESPN Sunday Night Baseball, a rivalry game between the Chicago Cubs and Chicago White Sox, in which the White Sox won 9–3 (marking their first three-game series sweep at Wrigley Field since May 2012). The telecast marked the first regular season Major League Baseball game shown on ABC since August 1995 (during its involvement in the short-lived Baseball Network consortium with NBC), and the first time that ABC had broadcast a regular season MLB game produced by ESPN, which fully absorbed the network's sports division in 2006. (ABC resumed airing MLB games of any kind on a limited basis in September 2020, by arrangement with ESPN for the league's wild card round.)	
11	Jeopardy! distributor Sony Pictures Television announces two new permanent hosts for the show: executive producer Mike Richards was assigned to helm the daily syndicated version, while actress Mayim Bialik hosts primetime and spinoff versions, including a "National College Championship" slated to air on ABC in 2022. Both Richards and Bialik were among Jeopardy's guest hosts in the months after former host Alex Trebek's death. Richards subsequently resigned as host on August 20 and was later fired as showrunner of Jeopardy! and Wheel of Fortune (both of which he oversaw since succeeding longtime producer Harry Friedman in May 2020, after the latter's retirement) on August 31, amid scrutiny over misogynistic and offensive remarks he made on his 2013–14 podcast The Randumb Show, and prior wrongful termination lawsuits filed by two models dismissed during his 2009–19 producing tenure on The Price is Right. The five completed syndicated episodes that Richards hosted—filmed the day before his resignation—would air as scheduled to kick off the new season the week of September 13, with Bialik and Ken Jennings alternating multi-week stints for the remainder of it.	
19	Bally Sports Detroit suspends Detroit Tigers color commentator Jack Morris after he used an offensive Asian accent while talking about Japanese Los Angeles Angels utility player Shohei Ohtani during a game on August 17. Morris apologized for the incident later in the game and Ohtani said he was not offended after seeing the video.	
19	Actress Briana Thomas (who had a background role as a barista for multiple episodes from 2018 to 2019) filed a discrimination and wrongful termination lawsuit against The Young and the Restless distributor Sony Pictures Television and CBS, alleging that Anthony Morina—who has served as the soap opera's executive producer/showrunner since 2018—had sexually harassed her on multiple occasions (including complimenting her body, offering her a "private acting lesson", and asking her to remove a sarong during the filming of one scene in order to see her fully in a bikini), and had publicly verbally abused her on-set before firing her from Y&R via email in retaliation for spurning his advances.	
20	Carrie Ann Inaba announces her departure from The Talk after three seasons. Inaba, who assumed the moderator/co-host slot previously held by Julie Chen Moonves in January 2019, had been on sabbatical from the CBS daytime talk show since April, a move she then cited was "to focus on [her] well-being". Inaba's departure was the first in a series of hosting changes for The Talk: Elaine Welteroth, who joined the panel in January 2020, subsequently announced on August 31 that she would also be leaving the program; American Ninja Warrior co-host Akbar Gbajabiamila (who guest co-hosted multiple episodes between April and July) was announced to occupy one of the vacancies on September 2, followed by the addition of journalist Natalie Morales (who announced three days prior that she would depart NBC News after 22 years with the network news division) on October 3.	
20	Disney Media Distribution announces that ABC News would assume production oversight of Tamron Hall, effective with the syndicated daytime talk show's third season, which would premiere on September 6. The division already oversees two of ABC's daytime programs: The View (originally overseen by the network's daytime division from 1997 to 2014) and the news-based Good Morning America extension program GMA3: What You Need To Know (originally formatted as a lighter talk show from 2018 to 2020, when it was overhauled into its current hard news/interview format amid the COVID-19 pandemic).	
25	ESPN removes Rachel Nichols—who had been a host and sideline reporter for the network in two different stints since 2004 (she left ESPN in 2013 for Turner Sports, working there for three years)—from her NBA coverage assignments, along with canceling The Jump (a daily basketball analysis program she had hosted since its 2016 debut), in the wake of a recorded 2020 phone conversation with Adam Mendelsohn (an advisor to LeBron James) leaked on July 4, in which Nichols lamented Maria Taylor (who is Black) being assigned to cover the 2020 NBA Finals over herself, implying Taylor got the assignment because of "pressure" toward ESPN to address their "crappy longtime record on diversity," remarks which earlier resulted in the network dropping Nichols from covering the 2021 Finals. (Taylor left ESPN on July 31, subsequently joining NBC Sports as a correspondent through a deal signed ten days prior.)	
25	Kirstyn Crawford, a former producer for Good Morning America anchor George Stephanopoulos, files a civil lawsuit against ABC and former GMA and World News Tonight executive producer Michael Corn (who was named president of news at NewsNation on May 28) in the New York Supreme Court. The suit alleges sexual assault and attempted sexual coercion by Corn toward Crawford (by repeatedly forcing her head into his chest, kissing her and rubbing her legs during an Uber ride, and fabricating the loss of his hotel key to be invited into her room for sex during a 2015 assignment to cover the 87th Academy Awards for GMA) and ex-WNT staffer/supporting claimant Jill McClain (by groping and forcing himself on her during two separate 2010 assignments for World News Tonight, which he executive produced from 2010 to 2014), that Corn fostered a toxic work environment at both programs, and that ABC News management did not investigate the complaints against Corn (including one filed by Stephanopoulos on Crawford's behalf). Corn dismissed the claims as "demonstrably false," pointing to emails between him and Crawford that he claims contradict her allegations.	
29	Hours after Hurricane Ida makes landfall as a Category 4 near Port Fourchon, Louisiana, Nexstar's New Orleans duopoly of WGNO (ABC) and WNOL (CW) suffers significant wind and flood damage to their shared studio building at the Metairie-based Galleria office complex. A section of the ceiling above the control room was peeled away, forcing duopoly personnel to be evacuated from that area during WGNO's hurricane coverage and causing flooding within the building (including its newsroom); some of the facility's exterior walls and a satellite relay dish were also damaged. Gray-owned Fox affiliate WVUE is forced to temporarily relocate some of its anchors and personnel to the studios of sister stations WBRC/Birmingham and WAFB/Baton Rouge the next day, after its studio building loses generator power following a "catastrophic" electrical outage that affected over 90% of homes and businesses in Orleans Parish (including the majority of New Orleans proper). Over 350,000 cable subscribers in the storm's path were left without TV and/or internet service (338,115 of them being in Louisiana, including New Orleans-area customers of Cox, Spectrum and U-verse).	
29	ESPN's High School Showcase airs a high school football contest between IMG Academy and the Bishop Sycamore Centurions, only realizing partway through the game—which IMG would ultimately win 58–0—that there were numerous inconsistencies in the claims that Bishop Sycamore had made to secure the national television slot, including questions on the identities and credentials of Bishop Sycamore's players, many of whom were revealed as graduates of other schools who had gone unrecruited; the team's playing of another game less than 48 hours before against the rules of every high school sanctioning body in the United States; and the organization of Bishop Sycamore itself, which did not exist before 2019 and has scant evidence of being a high school as it claims. Both ESPN and its scheduler Paragon Marketing Group admitted they had failed to do their due diligence in scheduling the Centurions.	

== September ==
Date	Event	Source
2	Locast indefinitely suspends operations, two days after New York Southern District Judge Louis Stanton denied the streaming service a summary judgment that would have exempted it from copyright liability; the ruling set up a likely trial in 2022 for an infringement lawsuit filed in 2019 by the owners of NBC, ABC, CBS and Fox. Locast contended it was exempt from liability under the Copyright Act because it seeks $5 monthly donations from users—earning around $4.3 million to date, nearly twice the $2.4 million it incurred in operational expenses—to cover costs of "maintaining and operating an expanding system" that streams retransmitted broadcast signals to users within the markets it operates. Stanton asserted the donations amounted to surcharges to allow Locast users to receive uninterrupted streams following a 15-minute free viewing window (occurring four times per hour until a donation is made, a feature it suspended on September 1 in light of the ruling), and asserted no provision exists that would allow the donations to be used for expansion of the service into additional markets.	
6	Buzzr began rerunning the cult 1979–80 game show Whew! for the first time, returning the show to television for the first time in 41 years, in a licensing agreement with owners Burt Sugarman and Jay Wolpert, who retained ownership of the series.	
7	CBS revamps its weekday morning show franchise, relaunching it as CBS Mornings and incorporating feature segments during its second hour to tie the program in more closely with CBS Sunday Morning. The changes, which also involve the addition of sportscaster and former NFL wide receiver Nate Burleson as tertiary co-anchor (alongside co-anchors Gayle King and Tony Dokoupil, both holdovers from the preceding CBS This Morning format) and the incorporation of the abstract sun motif and "Abblasen" trumpet fanfare used by Sunday Morning since its January 1979 debut (mirroring the unified 1979–82 Morning format), coincides with the network moving production of its morning shows to a new studio at One Astor Plaza in Times Square. The Saturday edition, retitled CBS Saturday Morning and which already incorporates feature segments similar to those on Sunday Morning, followed suit—retaining its existing anchors—on September 18.	
12	The 2021 MTV Video Music Awards are aired from the Barclays Center with Doja Cat hosting.	
15	The NBA's Milwaukee Bucks announce Lisa Byington as their new play-by-play announcer for local TV broadcasts on Bally Sports Wisconsin, succeeding the retired Jim Paschke. Byington becomes the first female to call TV play-by-play on a full-time regular-season basis for a major men's pro sports team.	
18	Adult Swim and TBS' rights to Family Guy expire and the show has their final airings on those networks. FXX and Freeform begin airing the first fifteen seasons. The show also joins FX's lineup that month. These deals did not affect the syndication rights held by local broadcast stations. The show's departure from Adult Swim on September 18, 2021, was commemorated with a remembrance bumper created by the network, which played after the final airing (the episode "Stewie is Enceinte"). The bumper showed animations of several Adult Swim characters bidding farewell to Family Guy, including shots of Peter crying at the beginning and the Griffin family waving goodbye towards the end.	
19	The 73rd Primetime Emmy Awards air on CBS. Cedric the Entertainer serves as host of a ceremony that sees Netflix earn 10 Emmys (out of a record-tying 44 when combined with the previous weekend's Creative Arts Emmys); the service's The Crown and The Queen's Gambit respectively win outstanding Drama Series and Limited or Anthology Series; and Apple TV+'s Ted Lasso claim Outstanding Comedy Series.	
20	Dancing with the Stars premieres its 30th season on ABC, which features a regular same-gender dance pairing for the first time in the reality competition's history: singer/actress JoJo Siwa (who came out as pansexual in April 2021, and, on August 26, was among the first two celebrity contestants announced to appear that season, alongside Olympic gold-medal gymnast Sunisa Lee) is paired with a female professional partner, announced as Jenna Johnson on the season premiere. (Season 22 contestants Nyle DiMarco and Jodie Sweetin were both paired with pro dancers of the same gender for one-time routines in 2016; certain international versions of the franchise have featured occasional same-gender partnerships dating to 2010, when the Israeli version Rokdim Im Kokhavim paired sportscaster Gili Shem Tov with female dancer Dorit Milman.) NBA shooting guard Iman Shumpert (the first NBA player to become a finalist and winner in the show's history) and professional partner Daniella Karagach (in her first partner victory) would win the Season 30 mirror ball trophy on November 22.	
22	In the midst of the Climate Week NYC summit, the topic of climate change takes the late night spotlight for "Climate Night": All seven of the major broadcast and cable late-night talk shows — TBS' Full Frontal with Samantha Bee, Comedy Central's The Daily Show with Trevor Noah, ABC's Jimmy Kimmel Live, CBS' Late Show with Stephen Colbert and Late Late Show with James Corden, and NBC's The Tonight Show Starring Jimmy Fallon and Late Night with Seth Meyers — feature segments on and activists involved in the issue of climate change.	
24	About 15 minutes into that morning's live broadcast, co-host Sunny Hostin and recurring guest co-host Ana Navarro (both of whom were fully vaccinated) are asked to leave the set of The View after rapid antigen tests taken before the live taping revealed they both had tested positive for COVID-19. Their test results were later revealed on-air by fellow panelists Joy Behar and Sara Haines, and resulted in a scheduled in-studio interview with Vice President Kamala Harris to be delayed (and abbreviated) so it could instead be conducted remotely from a separate room elsewhere within New York's ABC Broadcast Center. A White House official stated that Harris had not interacted with Hostin and Navarro prior to the broadcast. The initial results were later found to have been false positives as subsequent rapid tests taken backstage came back negative, resulting in Hostin and Navarro being cleared to host the following Monday's (September 27) broadcast.	
26	The 74th Tony Awards air on CBS and Paramount+ from New York's Winter Garden Theatre. Originally scheduled for June 7, 2020, at Radio City Music Hall, the ceremony had long been delayed due to the COVID-19 pandemic that kept Broadway theatre shut down from March 2020 until a return date weeks before this ceremony. The 74th Tonys were expanded to a four-hour event, with acting, directing, and technical awards (nominations for which were announced in October 2020) presented in a two-hour segment shown exclusively on Paramount+ and hosted by Audra McDonald, then continued on CBS with a two-hour concert billed as The Tony Awards Present: Broadway's Back! (hosted by Leslie Odom Jr.) that featured live Broadway performances and the awarding of the Tonys for Best Play (The Inheritance), Best Play Revival (A Soldier's Play), and Best Musical (Moulin Rouge!).	
27	In an unusual move, KATU/Portland, OR has what one staffer terms a "No News Monday": The morning, afternoon, and early evening newscasts at the Sinclair Broadcast Group-owned ABC affiliate are cancelled for the day (rebroadcasts of KATU-produced specials air in their place) so that the station's news staff can attend a seminar designed to deal with job-related trauma and stress.	
29	Xavier Prather becomes the first Black HouseGuest to win the main U.S. version of Big Brother, defeating Derek Frazier (son of the late Joe Frazier) for the $750,000 grand prize (increased from $250,000 in past seasons) by a unanimous 9–0 vote of its "jury" of evicted contestants in the Season 23 finale. Prather, Frazier and "America's Favorite HouseGuest" honoree Tiffany Mitchell (who won $50,000, up from the prior $25,000 for the viewer-voted prize) were members of "The Cookout," an all-Black alliance formed early in the season by six of the initial 16 contestants (eight of whom were persons of color, a byproduct of CBS casting policies instituted in response to the George Floyd protests requiring BIPOC participants represent at least 50% of the contestants cast on its reality competition shows) with the intent of securing the historic feat. Among the U.S. versions of the franchise, Prather is preceded in this distinction by Tamar Braxton, who won the show's celebrity edition in 2019.	
29	In the FCC Enforcement Bureau's first penalty action pertaining to Internet-transmitted closed captioning, ViacomCBS settles an investigation into violations of the 21st Century Communications and Video Accessibility Act of 2010 (which require live and pre-recorded video programming delivered via internet television services incorporate captions if broadcast with captioning in original linear TV airings) concerning multiple reported instances, dating to January 2018, of captions being absent from certain programs featured on Pluto TV's linear streaming channels and VOD menu. Under the consent decree, the company agreed to pay $3.5 million in fines and to implement a compliance plan to ensure captions are included on all Pluto TV content.	
30	Dish Network drops three channels it carried among the four regional AT&T SportsNet/Root Sports networks (AT&T SportsNet Rocky Mountain, AT&T SportsNet Pittsburgh and Root Sports Northwest) from the satellite provider's lineup, after Dish and the regional sports network group's parent, AT&T Sports Networks LLC, fail to reach terms on a renewed carriage agreement before the existing deal's midnight (ET) expiration deadline.	

== October ==
Date	Event	Source
1	On the 60th anniversary of the Christian Broadcasting Network's first broadcast, Pat Robertson—who had hosted the Christian-oriented news/talk show since its April 1966 premiere—announced he is stepping down as regular co-host of The 700 Club after that day's telecast to focus on his role as chancellor and CEO of Virginia Beach-based Regent University (which Robertson founded in 1977). The elder Robertson will continue to appear on the monthly 700 Club Interactive and make occasional appearances on The 700 Club. CBN CEO Gordon Robertson, who has also served as a co-host and executive producer of the program since 1998, succeeded his father as primary co-host of the ministry's flagship program on October 4.	
1	A disagreement between Comcast and network parent Madison Square Garden Entertainment results in the cable provider dropping MSG Network and MSG Plus from its Xfinity systems in New Jersey and Connecticut.	
1	DirecTV removes Bloomberg Television from the lineups of its namesake direct-broadcast satellite service, DirecTV Stream and U-verse. The DirecTV satellite service had carried the financial news network since its 1994 inception (both via its standalone 24-hour feed as well as the time-lease blocks that Bloomberg had run on USA Network until 2004 and on E! thereafter until 2009).	
2	With the network's annual two-night season lead-off telecast of the iHeartRadio Music Festival, The CW begins regularly offering prime-time programming on Saturdays (running from 8:00 to 10:00 p.m. ET/PT), replacing syndicated series, feature film packages and/or local programs (including in some cases, paid programming) that its affiliates had run on that night. It marks the first time The CW has programmed that night in its 15-year history and makes it only the sixth conventional U.S. English-language commercial broadcast network—counting the modern "Big Four" and the now-defunct DuMont—ever to maintain a seven-night-a-week schedule. (Fox, which has programmed Saturdays since July 1987, was the last network to start offering a full weekly schedule upon adding prime-time programming on Tuesdays and Wednesdays in January 1993; CW predecessors The WB and UPN never programmed Saturday prime time during their existences.) As a trade-off for the move, the network shuttered its daytime block on September 3, giving that one hour per weekday back to its affiliates effective September 6 and leaving its Saturday morning E/I block, One Magnificent Morning, as the only non-prime-time programming remaining on The CW's schedule. The night's regular schedule debuted the following Saturday (October 9), consisting of returning unscripted shows Whose Line Is It Anyway? and World's Funniest Animals.	
5	The 2021 BET Hip Hop Awards are aired.	
6	Dish Network removes 64 Tegna-owned local stations from nearly 3 million customers in 53 markets across the country. On October 18, Dish Network filed a complaint with the Federal Communications Commission against Tegna.	
6	A Reuters investigation reported that, according to court documents from depositions in 2019 and 2020, Robert Herring founded far-right news/opinion channel One America News Network—which has been the subject of criticism and legal issues related to its promoting of false claims of election fraud during the 2020 presidential election, among other falsehoods and conspiracy theories—at the urging of executives at AT&T (which owns competitor CNN through its WarnerMedia unit) who felt that an additional conservative news channel was needed to counterbalance existing left- and centrist-leaning news channels being offered on DirecTV and U-verse (spun off by AT&T in April). Documents also disclosed that AT&T had provided up to 90% of the revenues to OAN, and the network had promised to "cast a positive light" on AT&T during newscasts.	
11	The Talk's host panel returns to five permanent spots with the addition of Natalie Morales; she joins the CBS daytime talk show after a 22-year tenure with NBC News, where her duties included serving as correspondent for Dateline and West Coast anchor for Today.	
11	Mark Harmon makes his final appearance as a cast regular on NCIS, with his character, Agent Leroy Jethro Gibbs, choosing to stay behind in the relative peace of Alaska after solving a case there. Harmon, who had been in the CBS drama series' cast since its first season in 2003, remains associated with the show as an executive producer.	
17	Sinclair Broadcast Group is struck by a ransomware attack that resulted in data being taken from its IT networks, and knocked internal servers, email servers, corporate phone lines, and workstations and news graphics systems at its television stations offline. Programming was also disrupted over subsequent days: production of live news broadcasts were impacted—many stations had to produce their newscasts using limited internal resources, while a few were forced to preempt them outright (substituted by syndicated programs or a feed of The National Desk)—as were scheduled NFL game telecasts on its NBC, CBS and Fox affiliates on the 17th; Sinclair also supplied alternative feeds, mainly from company-owned multicast networks like Charge! and TBD, to fill airtime on some of the affected stations. The hackers are believed to be connected to the Russian cybergang Evil Corp. (which was sanctioned by the U.S. Treasury Department in 2019), and to have breached the stations’ internal broadcasting systems by disseminating the Macaw ransomware strain (linked to an October 10 cyberattack on Olympus Corporation) via an interconnected Active Directory domain linked across Sinclair's internal network.	
17	Actress Melissa Joan Hart wins $1 million for her charity of Youth Village on that night's Celebrity Wheel of Fortune, raising a total of $1,039,800 (largest overall in the show's Primetime version) and becoming the fourth overall contestant to win the grand prize since Sarah Manchester on the September 17, 2014, episode. For the celebrity episodes, four Million Dollar Wedges (without showing the bankrupts) are available from the second round which enables a celebrity to play for the prize by replacing one of the four $100,000 envelopes in the bonus round if claimed.	
20	Jesse Spencer makes his final appearance as a series regular on Chicago Fire. During the series’ 200th episode, Spencer's character, Fire Capt. Matthew Casey, prepares to move to Oregon to take care of the sons of fallen firefighter Andrew Darden (who was killed in the line of duty in the show's pilot episode). Citing his involvement as a television series regular for 18 consecutive years (having played Dr. Robert Chase in House for eight seasons beforehand), Spencer, who had been with the NBC drama series since its first season in 2012, left to pursue other projects and to take care of his family.	
22	In the aftermath of the Rust shooting incident, The Rookie showrunner Alexi Hawley announces that the ABC drama series would ban live firearms on set, stating that "it is now policy on The Rookie that all gunfire on set will be Airsoft guns with CGI muzzle flashes added in post."	
25	MSNBC and Morning Joe co-hosts Joe Scarborough and Mika Brzezinski announce that Jonathan Lemire is named permanent anchor of MSNBC's early morning program Way Too Early, succeeding Kasie Hunt who left MSNBC and NBC News in July to join CNN.(see July 16 entry)	

== November ==
Date	Event	Source
2	Game 6 of the World Series is broadcast on Fox. The Atlanta Braves defeat the Houston Astros, winning their first title since 1995 and second since moving to Atlanta. It was the second time the Astros lost the series to an National League East team since 2019 (with the Nationals) and the third time they lost at Minute Maid Park since 2005 (with the White Sox). This also marked Joe Buck's last appearance as an announcer for Fox Sports broadcasts after 27 years. He will later sign a multi-year deal with ESPN and ABC along with Troy Aikman in 2022.	
8	ABC confirms that Ingo Rademacher was released from his contract with General Hospital, where he played the character of Jasper "Jax" Jacks off-and-on since 1996, after not complying with a November 1 deadline for the soap opera's cast and crew to provide proof of COVID-19 vaccination. (He has been a vocal critic of such mandates.) The news of Rademacher's exit also came one day after he shared a meme by conservative author Allie Beth Stuckey on Instagram labeling Assistant Health Secretary Rachel Levine (who is transgender) a "dude"; the post—which also mocked both the notion that Levine is "an empowering woman" and the assertion that Virginia Lieutenant Governor-elect Winsome Sears (a Black Republican) could be deemed a "white supremacist"—drew criticism from fellow castmates, among them transgender actress Cassandra James (recurring character Dr. Terry Randolph). Rademacher made his last on-air appearance on November 22. He later filed suit against ABC on December 13, challenging the network's vaccine mandate on constitutional, religious discrimination and privacy grounds.	
10	The 55th Annual Country Music Association Awards air on ABC from the Bridgestone Arena in Nashville, Tennessee, with Luke Bryan as host for the first time, making him the first solo host in 18 years. Notable winners included Luke Combs (for "Entertainer of the Year"), Chris Stapleton (who won four awards including "Male Vocalist of the Year" and "Album of the Year" for Starting Over) and Jimmie Allen (for "New Artist of the Year").	
17	The National Academy of Television Arts and Sciences announces the formation of a new Emmys ceremony dedicated to children's and family programming, the Children's & Family Emmy Awards, after such programming of all dayparts fell under their jurisdiction for the first time for the 48th Daytime Emmy Awards, at which children's and family programming had a dedicated night.	
18	Kenosha County Judge Bruce Schroeder bans MSNBC and everyone affiliated with the network from the courthouse for the duration of the trial of Kyle Rittenhouse. The judge explained that on the previous night, Kenosha police noticed a car following the jury bus, and stopped it when it ran a red light. Schroeder identified the driver in court as "James J. Morrison, who claimed he was a producer with NBC News, employed by MSNBC" and that Morrison alleged to police that he had been instructed by his supervisor, New York-based producer Irene Byon, to follow the jury bus. Police took Morrison into custody on suspicion of photographing jurors, but after they found no pictures of jurors, he was "issued traffic related citations" and released.	
21	The 49th American Music Awards aired on ABC from the Microsoft Theater in Los Angeles, with Cardi B as host. (She also won "Favorite Rap/Hip Hop Song" for "Up" during the ceremony, becoming the first three-time winner in that category.) BTS (for "Artist of the Year", "Favorite Duo or Group – Pop", and "Favorite Song – Pop" for "Butter"), Doja Cat (for "Favorite Female Artist – R&B", "Favorite Album – R&B" for "Planet Her", "Collaboration of the Year" for "Kiss Me More" ft. SZA), and Megan Thee Stallion (for "Favorite Female Artist – Hip-Hop", "Favorite Album – Hip-Hop" for Good News, and "Favorite Trending Song" for "Body") won three awards each.	
23	Steve Burton, who played the character of Jason Morgan off-and-on since 1991 (with a hiatus from 2012 to 2017), confirmed he was released from his contract with General Hospital, becoming the second actor (after Ingo Rademacher, see November 8 entry for details) to be let go from the ABC soap opera after declining to comply with a November 1 proof of COVID-19 vaccination deadline for cast and crew. Burton, who contracted COVID-19 in August, disclosed in an Instagram post that he unsuccessfully sought approval from the show's production staff for medical and religious exemptions to the vaccine requirement; Burton's last on-air appearance on the show aired on November 19.	
30	Surgeon and TV host Dr. Mehmet Oz announces his candidacy for the Republican nomination for the U.S. Senate seat representing Pennsylvania that Pat Toomey will vacate (via retirement) at the end of his third term in January 2023. Oz's announcement leads to stations located in or which have significant broadcast/cable reach into Pennsylvania pulling The Dr. Oz Show from their schedules on December 1, among them Fox-owned WTXF/Philadelphia and WNYW/New York City, Nexstar-owned WJW/Cleveland, Sinclair-owned WPGH/Pittsburgh and WATM/Altoona, and Hearst-owned WGAL/Lancaster; following suit were SJL-owned WICU/Erie and Nexstar-owned WBRE/Scranton–Wilkes-Barre on December 6, and Nexstar-owned WBGH/Binghamton on December 13. The stations make the move out of concerns that leaving the show on their schedule would require them to give equal time to Oz's rival candidates should they request it.	(Note: Because of contractual obligations to distribute The Dr. Oz Show through the 2022–23 television season, distributor Sony Pictures Television announced on December 13 that the show would be replaced The Good Dish, a food-themed talk show co-hosted by daughter Daphne Oz, food writer Gail Simmons and former Next Food Network Star contestant Jamika Pessoa (and based on a recurring food segment on Dr. Oz) that would premiere on January 17, 2022, filling Dr. Oz's timeslots on stations still carrying it. It is not known whether the stations that dropped The Dr. Oz Show due to the equal time requirements, all of which put other local or syndicated programs into the show's slots in the respective markets, offered The Good Dish.)

== December ==
Date	Event	Source
1	It's Always Sunny in Philadelphia premieres its 15th season on FXX, becoming the longest-running live-action comedy series in TV history by number of seasons, surpassing The Adventures of Ozzie and Harriet's 14-season run.	
4	CNN fires Chris Cuomo—permanently ending his program, Cuomo Prime Time—four days after the network initially placed him on indefinite suspension following the November 29 release of documents in the sexual harassment investigation against his brother, former New York Governor Andrew Cuomo, which revealed the anchor had a more participatory role in his brother's defense than he had previously disclosed. The transcripts and exhibits, released by the office of New York State Attorney General Letitia James, included text messages showing Cuomo had sought to use his media sources to conduct research on the former governor's accusers, had offered to help the governor's office prepare its defense, and had dictated statements for his brother to use in depositions. (Shortly before his brother's resignation from office in August, Cuomo had apologized for having advised his brother's senior political aides and advisers in relation to the investigation, an act widely viewed as having breached traditional ethical barriers between journalists and lawmakers.) Rotating fill-in programs (starting with an expanded edition of Anderson Cooper 360°, which filled the slot from November 30–December 2) air in Cuomo Prime Time's former 9:00 p.m. ET slot until a permanent replacement show is announced.(see May 17, 2023 entry)	
7	The 47th People's Choice Awards are held at the Barker Hangar in Santa Monica, California, with Kenan Thompson as host. This was the first ceremony to air simultaneously on both E! and NBC, with the latter marking its return to broadcast television when CBS last aired the ceremony in 2017. BTS (for "Group of 2021", "Song of 2021" and "Music Video of 2021", the latter two for "Butter") and Dwayne Johnson (for the "People's Champion Award", "Comedy Movie Star of 2021" and "Male Movie Star of 2021", the latter two for his role in Jungle Cruise) were the most-awarded nominees, earning three awards each. Television winners included Loki for "Show of 2021", Grey's Anatomy for "Drama Show of 2021", Never Have I Ever for "Comedy Show of 2021" and Keeping Up With the Kardashians for "Reality Show of 2021".	
9	Former 19 Kids and Counting star Josh Duggar is convicted of receiving and possessing child pornography on federal charges tied to his April 29 arrest by U.S. Marshals following a two-year federal investigation by the U.S. Attorney for the Western District of Arkansas. Facing a sentence of up to 20 years in prison and fines of up to $250,000 for each count, he ultimately is sentenced to 12 years and 7 months in May 2022.	
9	Jussie Smollett is found guilty of five of six counts of felony disorderly conduct from a January 2019 incident during which Smollett falsely reported to police that he was the victim of a racist and homophobic hate crime. It is believed and testified that he actually staged it. At the time, the fallout of the incident resulted in his being written out of Empire, on which he starred. In March 2022, Smollett is sentenced to five months in jail, 30 months of felony probation and was fined $25,000. He also must pay $120,000 in restitution.	
9	Brian Williams leaves NBC News after 28 years, a tenure that included anchoring NBC Nightly News from 2004 to 2015 (as well as a prior stint as the program's weekend anchor from 1993 to 1999), Rock Center with Brian Williams from 2011 to 2013, and MSNBC's The 11th Hour, which began in September 2016 and continued with rotating hosts in the interim (see January 27 entry)	
12	In a surprise on-air announcement, Chris Wallace announces his departure from Fox News, where he had hosted its Sunday morning news discussion program Fox News Sunday since 2003. Later in the day, it is revealed that Wallace would join CNN+, where he would debut Who's Talking to Chris Wallace? when the ill-fated streaming service launched in March 2022.	
14	The Voice names trio Girl Named Tom the winners of the 21st season, the first group to do so on the American version.	
14	Woods Communications Corp. reaches an agreement to sell its Montgomery, Alabama, television station cluster—Fox affiliate WCOV-TV, Cozi TV affiliate WIYC (also a part-time MyNetworkTV affiliate via its DT2 subchannel), and True Crime Network affiliate WALE-LD—to Allen Media Broadcasting for $28.5 million in cash. The sale marks the Woods family's exit from television broadcasting: David Woods purchased WCOV (then a CBS affiliate) in 1985 and owned WDFX/Dothan from 1991 to 1999, while his late father, Charles, owned several stations in the Southern U.S. for many years through a separate company (including WTVY/Dothan, which he built and signed on in 1955 and owned until 2000). The sale was completed on April 14, 2023.	
14	In response to the growth of streaming television, the Academy of Television Arts & Sciences and the National Academy of Television Arts and Sciences announce a major realignment of the Daytime and Primetime Emmys. Beginning in 2022, the two ceremonies' scopes revolve around factors such as the themes and frequency of such programming, rather than strictly follow whether programs air in daytime or primetime. Among the major changes, daytime dramas, as defined as "any multi-camera, weekday daily serial, spin-off or reboot", remain in the Daytime Emmys but all other drama programs move to the Primetime Emmys. All children's programming moves to the newly created Children's & Family Emmy Awards. Morning shows move from the Daytime Emmys to the News & Documentary Emmys. Talk shows will now be divided between the Daytime and Primetime Emmys based on "format and style characteristics reflective of current programming in the daytime or late night space".	
15	Jeff Garlin exits his role of family patriarch Murray Goldberg on the ABC sitcom The Goldbergs following multiple misconduct allegations and human resources investigations. He had been a series regular for all nine seasons, however by this point with a reduced schedule.	
17	Jay Johnston is reported to have been "banned" from the recurring role of Jimmy Pesto Sr. on the animated Fox sitcom Bob's Burgers, due to his alleged participation in the January 6 attack on the U.S. Capitol. (He has not been arrested or charged in connection to the attack, but is alleged to have been in an FBI suspect-of-interest poster and in riot footage.) Johnston had been voicing the character since the show's premiere in 2011. The character's most recent appearance was "Bridge Over Troubled Rudy", which aired on May 2.	
18	NBC's Saturday Night Live decides to air its scheduled new episode—hosted by Paul Rudd in his fifth guest-host role—as a recorded, scaled-down broadcast, citing COVID-19 safety concerns: the episode was taped with no studio audience or musical guest (a scheduled performance by Charli XCX was canceled hours prior to the taping), featured a limited cast and crew (Rudd, cast regulars Kenan Thompson and Michael Che, and guest stars Tina Fey and Tom Hanks were the only performers present on-set, while Steve Martin taped his guest appearance), and included mostly taped and classic sketches (including some filmed during pre-show rehearsals). The episode's emergency format change is believed to be due to concerns about exposure to cast and crew after scheduled guest star (and former cast member) Jimmy Fallon, who was fully vaccinated, tested COVID-positive after the December 17 taping of The Tonight Show (which tapes in the same building as SNL). Fey and Seth Meyers would later confirm in an April 19, 2022, interview on Late Night that Colin Jost had also contracted COVID.	
18	YouTube TV drops all Disney-owned networks it carries (including ABC, ESPN, Disney Channel, Freeform and FX), having failed to reach an agreement. A deal would be reached the following day, restoring the channels to the service.	
20	Chris Noth is fired from the CBS crime drama The Equalizer, on which he played William Bishop, following multiple allegations of sexual misconduct against the actor (including from two women who detailed their rape and assault allegations in a December 16 Hollywood Reporter article; and by actress Zoe Lister-Jones, who claimed that he was "consistently sexually inappropriate" and drunk while filming during her 2005 guest role on Law & Order: Criminal Intent). Noth denies the accusations and claims the assaults alleged were consensual encounters. His just-debuted Peloton advertisement made in response to plot developments in the Sex and the City followup And Just Like That... was also pulled due to the allegations (on December 17), while his scene in the first-season finale of the HBO Max series, which would air in February, was revealed the next month to have been cut. His final episode as Bishop would air January 2, 2022, and the character is killed off in the April 10 episode.	
21	Dish Network removes NESN after failing to reach a new carriage agreement, leaving the satellite provider with no regional sports networks remaining on its lineup. (Dish had been paring back its regional sports network offerings since the July 2019 removal of the Fox Sports Networks, since rebranded as Bally Sports, while also refusing to carry RSNs that fetch higher subscriber fees like YES Network, AT&T SportsNet Southwest and Spectrum SportsNet.) In order to cut programming costs, Dish reportedly offered to sell NESN a la carte or restrict its carriage to higher-priced channel packages, offers which the network refused.	
21	Fox cancels its scheduled New Year's Eve special, Fox's New Year's Eve Toast & Roast 2022 (which was to be hosted by Ken Jeong and Joel McHale, who hosted the special's inaugural edition the year prior), citing health and safety concerns related to the spread of the COVID-19 Omicron variant. The network scheduled reruns of Beat Shazam, Gordon Ramsay's Road Trip and I Can See Your Voice in place of the special. It was the first time since 1990 that Fox had not provided a national New Year's Eve special on broadcast television.	
31	Dick Clark's New Year's Rockin' Eve airs on ABC, hosted by Ryan Seacrest in Times Square and Ciara in Los Angeles (for pre-recorded concert segments); and featuring correspondents Liza Koshy (at Times Square), Billy Porter (at Jackson Square in New Orleans), and Roselyn Sánchez (at Distrito T-Mobile in San Juan). The 2022 edition marked the special's 50th anniversary (it premiered on NBC in 1971, and moved to ABC in 1974), and was the first to feature midnight celebrations for the Atlantic Time Zone (along with being the network's first Atlantic Time countdown since the day-long millennium telecast ABC 2000 Today, which aired in place of Rockin' Eve in 1999), as well as a Spanish-language countdown (presented from San Juan), in addition to the Times Square Ball and New Orleans fleur-de-lis drops. (The Puerto Rico countdown was interrupted on some ABC stations in the Eastern and Central Time Zones by late local programming in the 11:00/10:00 slot.) The special featured performances by headliners Ashanti, Ja Rule and Journey (the latter becoming the first group or band to serve as the show's midnight headline performer since NKOTBSB—the combined Backstreet Boys and New Kids on the Block—performed in the 2011 edition) as well as, among others, Daddy Yankee, OneRepublic, Avril Lavigne, Travis Barker and Macklemore & Ryan Lewis. (LL Cool J, due to contracting COVID-19; and Chlöe and Karol G, both for unspecified reasons, respectively cancelled their scheduled performances prior to broadcast.) The 2022 edition is also the first not to be produced by Dick Clark Productions, which MRC (which began producing Rockin’ Eve through its MRC Live & Alternative unit with that broadcast) discontinued as a studio imprint in September 2021.	
31	After a 21-year absence, CBS returned to broadcasting New Year's Eve live programming with New Year's Eve Live: Nashville's Big Bash, broadcast live from the Bicentennial Capitol Mall State Park in downtown Nashville, Tennessee, and various locations across the city. Hosted by Bobby Bones and Rachel Smith, the special featured performances by headliners Lady A, Dierks Bentley, Dan + Shay, Blake Shelton, Miranda Lambert, Brooks & Dunn, among others, as well as the event's renowned music note drop and fireworks display at midnight (CT). (Three other scheduled acts canceled their performances the day before the broadcast: Sam Hunt and Elle King, due to unspecified COVID-19 protocols; and the Zac Brown Band, due to Brown re-contracting COVID-19 following a prior bout in August.) This marked the network's first New Year's Eve special and the fourth one since America's Millennium (broadcast in 1999), and its predecessors Happy New Year, America (broadcast from 1979 to 1995) and New Year's Eve With Guy Lombardo (broadcast from 1956 to 1978).	
31	Miley's New Year's Eve Party airs on NBC, hosted by Miley Cyrus and Pete Davidson; and featuring performances by 24kGoldn, Anitta, Billie Joe Armstrong, Brandi Carlile, Jack Harlow, Kitty Cash, and Saweetie. The two-hour special—which replaced the Carson Daly-led NBC's New Year's Eve specials aired from 2004 to 2020, and was not split between prime time and late-night segments, with late local programming being moved to an hour earlier (which resulted in scheduling conflicts involving local late-night newscasts, many of which were simulcast on the partner outlet to compensate, in certain markets where an NBC-affiliated station produces a separate primetime newscast for a non-Big Three network affiliate, an independent station or a subchannel)—was developed as part of an overall content and development deal between Cyrus and NBCUniversal signed on May 14.	
31	Peter Roth steps down as the chairman of Warner Bros. Television Group and is succeeded by Channing Dungey.	
