= KJTV =

KJTV may refer to:

- KJTV-TV, a television station (channel 35, virtual 34) licensed to serve Lubbock, Texas, United States
- KJTV-CD, a low-power television station (channel 33, virtual 32) licensed to serve Lubbock-Wolfforth, Texas, United States
- KTTU (AM), a radio station (950 AM) licensed to serve Lubbock, Texas, United States, which held the call sign KJTV (AM) from 2000 to 2024
- KGET-TV, a television station (channel 17) licensed to serve Bakersfield, California, United States, which held the call sign KJTV-TV from 1969 to 1978
