= KABI-LD =

Television station in Snyder, Texas

- Snyder–Lubbock, Texas; United States
- City: Snyder, Texas
- Channels: Digital: 32 (UHF); Virtual: 42

Programming
- Affiliations: 42.1: Heroes & Icons; 42.2: Movies!

Ownership
- Owner: Gray Media; (Gray Television Licensee, LLC)
- Sister stations: KCBD, KLCW-TV, KJTV-TV, KMYL-LD, KJTV-CD, KXTQ-CD, KLBB-LD

History
- Founded: August 12, 1993
- First air date: May 16, 1996
- Former call signs: K69FQ (1996–1999); K42ET (1999–2015)
- Former channel numbers: Analog: 69 (UHF, 1996–1999), 42 (UHF, 1999–2015); Digital: 42 (UHF, 2015–2018)
- Former affiliations: Independent (1996–2014)

Technical information
- Licensing authority: FCC
- Facility ID: 55048
- ERP: 1.33 kW
- HAAT: 87 m (287 ft)
- Transmitter coordinates: 32°45′34″N 100°54′47″W

Links
- Public license information: LMS

KABI-LD (channel 42) is a low-power television station licensed to Snyder, Texas, United States, serving the Lubbock area as an affiliate of the digital multicast network Heroes & Icons. It is owned by Gray Media alongside NBC affiliate KCBD (channel 11), CW+ affiliate KLCW-TV (channel 22), Fox affiliate KJTV-TV (channel 34), and four other low-power stations. The stations share studios at 98th Street and University Avenue in south Lubbock. KABI-LD's transmitter is located north of Snyder.

As KABI-LD's transmitter is located in Snyder, its broadcast radius does not reach the major city in the market. Therefore, in order to reach the city, the station shares its subchannels with KLBB-LD's second and third subchannels respectively.

== Subchannels ==
The station's signal is multiplexed:

Subchannels of KABI-LD
| Channel | Res. | Short name | Programming |
|---|---|---|---|
| 42.1 | 1080i | H&I | Heroes & Icons |
| 42.2 | 1080i | MOVIES! | Movies! |
