= KXTQ-CD =

Television station in Lubbock, Texas

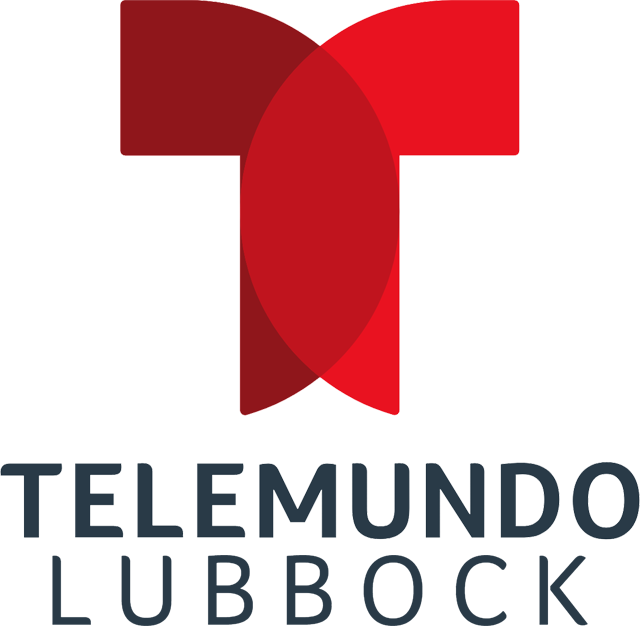
- Lubbock, Texas; United States
- Channels: Digital: 24 (UHF); Virtual: 46
- Branding: Telemundo Lubbock

Programming
- Affiliations: 46.1: Telemundo; 46.2: TeleXitos

Ownership
- Owner: Gray Media; (Gray Television Licensee, LLC)
- Sister stations: KCBD, KJTV-TV, KJTV-CD, KLCW-TV, KMYL-LD, KLBB-LD, KABI-LD

History
- Founded: August 21, 1989
- First air date: May 24, 1991
- Former call signs: K46CS (1989–1995); KXTQ-LP (1995–2003); KXTQ-CA (2003-2015)
- Former channel numbers: Analog: 46 (UHF, 1989–2015); Digital: 46 (UHF, 2015–2018)
- Former affiliations: The WB (secondary, 1995–1997)

Technical information
- Licensing authority: FCC
- Facility ID: 55055
- Class: CD
- ERP: 13.4 kW
- HAAT: 263.8 m (865 ft)
- Transmitter coordinates: 33°30′8.3″N 101°52′21.3″W

Links
- Public license information: Public file; LMS
- Website: www.telemundolubbock.com

KXTQ-CD (channel 46) is a low-power, Class A television station in Lubbock, Texas, United States, affiliated with the Spanish-language network Telemundo. It is owned by Gray Media alongside NBC affiliate KCBD (channel 11), CW+ affiliate KLCW-TV (channel 22), Fox affiliate KJTV-TV (channel 34), and four other low-power stations. The stations share studios at 98th Street and University Avenue in south Lubbock, where KXTQ-CD's transmitter is also located.

This is the former logo of KXTQ-CD that was used until late 2013.

== News operation ==
KXTQ-CD produces newscasts at 5 p.m. and 10 p.m. Monday through Friday; they are the only local Spanish-language productions in the market.

On October 10, 2022, KXTQ started airing a morning show, Noticias Telemundo Texas, which ran from 5 to 7 a.m. The program was produced out of KXTX-TV's studios in Fort Worth. On November 1, 2024, Noticias Telemundo Texas was discontinued.

== Subchannels ==
The station's signal is multiplexed:

Subchannels of KXTQ-CD
Channel	Res.	Short name	Programming
46.1	720p	KXTQ	Telemundo
46.2	480i	TeleXit	TeleXitos
