= KLBB-LD =

Television station in Lubbock, Texas

- Lubbock, Texas; United States
- Channels: Digital: 19 (UHF); Virtual: 48
- Branding: MeTV Lubbock

Programming
- Subchannels: 48.1: MeTV; for others, see § Subchannels

Ownership
- Owner: Gray Media; (Gray Television Licensee, LLC)
- Sister stations: KCBD, KJTV-TV, KJTV-CD, KLCW-TV, KMYL-LD, KXTQ-CD, KABI-LD

History
- Founded: September 27, 1995
- First air date: January 30, 2001
- Former call signs: K64FD (1998); K48GB (1998–2012); KLBB-LP (2012–2014)
- Former channel number: Analog: 48 (UHF, 2001–2014)
- Former affiliations: Independent (2001–2010)
- Call sign meaning: Lubbock

Technical information
- Licensing authority: FCC
- Facility ID: 192484
- Class: LD
- ERP: 15 kW
- HAAT: 263.8 m (865 ft)
- Transmitter coordinates: 33°30′8.3″N 101°52′21.3″W

Links
- Public license information: LMS

KLBB-LD (channel 48) is a low-power television station in Lubbock, Texas, United States, affiliated with MeTV. It is owned by Gray Media alongside NBC affiliate KCBD (channel 11), CW+ affiliate KLCW-TV (channel 22), Fox affiliate KJTV-TV (channel 34), and four other low-power stations. The stations share studios at 98th Street and University Avenue in south Lubbock, where KLBB-LD's transmitter is also located.

== Subchannels ==
The station's signal is multiplexed:

Subchannels of KLBB-LD
Channel	Res.	Short name	Programming
48.1	480i	KLBBLD1	MeTV
48.2	480i	HEROES	Heroes & Icons
48.3	480i	MOVIES	Movies!
48.4	480i	LubMrkt	Infomercials (4:3)
