= KCBD =

Television station in Lubbock, Texas

- Lubbock, Texas; United States
- Channels: Digital: 35 (UHF); Virtual: 11
- Branding: KCBD 11; KCBD NewsChannel 11

Programming
- Affiliations: 11.1: NBC; for others, see § Subchannels

Ownership
- Owner: Gray Media; (Gray Television Licensee, LLC)
- Sister stations: KLCW-TV, KJTV-TV, KJTV-CD, KABI-LD, KLBB-LD, KMYL-LD, KXTQ-CD

History
- First air date: May 10, 1953
- Former call signs: KCBD-TV (1953–2003)
- Former channel numbers: Analog: 11 (VHF, 1953–2009); Digital: 9 (VHF, 2002–2009), 11 (VHF, 2009–2025)
- Former affiliations: ABC (secondary, 1953–1969)
- Call sign meaning: Caprock Broadcasting Company (original owner of station)

Technical information
- Licensing authority: FCC
- Facility ID: 27507
- ERP: 1,000 kW
- HAAT: 282.1 m (926 ft)
- Transmitter coordinates: 33°30′8.3″N 101°52′21.3″W

Links
- Public license information: Public file; LMS
- Website: www.kcbd.com

KCBD (channel 11) is a television station licensed to Lubbock, Texas, United States, affiliated with NBC. It is owned by Gray Media alongside CW+ affiliate KLCW-TV (channel 22), Fox affiliate KJTV-TV (channel 34), and five low-power stations. The stations share studios at 98th Street and University Avenue in south Lubbock; KCBD's transmitter is located at its former studios near the interchange of I-27 and Slaton Highway.

== History ==
KCBD-TV signed on the air on May 10, 1953, as the second television station in Lubbock, after KDUB-TV (now KLBK-TV). It was owned by a group headed by Joe Bryant, owner of KCBD radio (AM 1590). For a short time thereafter, Jim Reese was a broadcaster on KCBD. KCBD was a primary NBC affiliate with a secondary ABC affiliation. KCBD became a sole NBC affiliate in 1969 when KSEL (now KAMC) signed on and took the ABC affiliation. KCBD was also the first station in Lubbock to broadcast in color. From 1968 to 1983, KCBD-TV also operated KSWS-TV (channel 8) in Roswell, New Mexico, as a repeater or satellite station. The Roswell station is now KOBR, a semi-satellite of Albuquerque NBC affiliate KOB.

Bryant sold both KCBD and KSWS to State Telecasting Company of Columbia, South Carolina, in 1971; at the same time, WUSN-TV in Charleston, South Carolina, was also purchased, and STC decided to re-call that station WCBD-TV to coordinate with KCBD. The radio station was spun off to separate owners who changed the calls to KEND (at the then-end of the radio dial). It is now KDAV. State Telecasting sold the station to Caprock Broadcasting in 1983.

In early 1984, KCBD retired the Eyewitness News branding and the "11 KCBD-TV" logo in favor of the News 11 branding (see below) that it would use until around late 1993 or early 1994. In place of the "11 KCBD-TV" logo that they had used since the early 1970s, they introduced a new logo that featured a graphic of the outline of Texas with an "11" placed about where Lubbock would lay on that outline. The "11" would be to the right of and slightly above the "KCBD". In 1991, they would modify the logo, retiring the Texas outline while retaining the "KCBD11" logo. They would gradually phase it out over the second half of 1993 and first half of 1994 as they jettisoned the News 11 branding in favor of the current NewsChannel 11 branding.

Caprock Broadcasting sold the station to the Holsum bakery in 1986. Holsum sold KCBD to Cosmos Broadcasting, the broadcasting arm of South Carolina-based insurer Liberty Corporation, in 2000. Liberty exited the insurance business later that year, bringing the Cosmos stations directly under the Liberty banner. Liberty merged with Raycom Media in 2006.

In May 2002, KCBD became the first station in the Lubbock market to begin broadcasting a digital signal. Later that year, the station became the first to broadcast network programming in true High Definition.

Since 2002, Jeopardy! and Wheel of Fortune have aired on KCBD. Prior to that, they both aired on KLBK, although in late 1999, Wheel moved to KAMC. Live with Regis and Kelly had also aired on KAMC before moving to KCBD in 2004, though that show has returned to KAMC.

=== 2015 plane crash into transmitter ===
On the evening of February 4, 2015, a small plane crashed into KCBD's tower, damaging the structure and killing one passenger. There were no injuries at the station's nearby studios, but its power was taken out by the crash, disrupting its operations. The station continued to transmit on local cable provider Suddenlink Communications, and that night's 10 p.m. newscast originated from the facilities of the Lubbock Independent School District's "LISD TV" educational channel. By February 5, the remnant of the tower had been deliberately dropped, power was restored and operations had returned to the building. KCBD arranged a feed to another station in Lubbock and operated as a multicast of the other station. After rescanning receivers, virtually all viewers (including cable, Dish, DirecTV and off air) could see the station in standard definition.

=== Sale to Gray Television ===
On June 25, 2018, Atlanta-based Gray Television announced it had reached an agreement with Raycom to merge their respective broadcasting assets (consisting of Raycom's 63 existing owned-and/or-operated television stations, including KCBD and sister stations in nearby Amarillo KFDA-TV and KEYU, and Gray's 93 television stations) under Gray's corporate umbrella. The cash-and-stock merger transaction valued at $3.6 billion – in which Gray shareholders would acquire preferred stock currently held by Raycom – resulted in KCBD gaining a new sister station in the Odessa–Midland market as Gray planned to retain ownership of CBS affiliate KOSA-TV in exchange for selling fellow NBC affiliate KWES-TV (which would be sold to an independent company to comply with FCC ownership rules prohibiting common ownership of two of the four highest-rated stations in a single market, instead KWES and WTOL in Toledo, Ohio, would be sold to Tegna Inc.). The sale was approved on December 20, and was completed on January 2, 2019.

== Programming ==
KCBD has served as the South Plains' television partner for the Children's Miracle Network since the charity's inaugural 1984 telethon.

Starting with the 1989–90 season and ending with its final season (2010–11), KCBD broadcast The Oprah Winfrey Show to viewers in the South Plains. KLBK had aired the show for the previous two seasons. Oprah was not cleared in Lubbock during its first season (1986–87).

=== News operation ===
On April 10, 2011, KCBD began broadcasting their newscasts in high definition.

KCBD's stability, especially in terms of its anchor staff, has contributed to its relative standing in the Lubbock media market. Since 1984, when it switched from the Eyewitness News branding to News 11 (one it would keep through about 1993 or 1994) KCBD's newscasts have routinely ranked #1 in the Lubbock market. Abner Euresti has been at the station since the mid-1970s when he anchored with Jane Prince. Euresti was paired with Karin McCay in 1980 under news director Carl Skip Watson (guiding light of the Lubbock food bank initiative) and have worked together since. Not far behind is chief meteorologist John Robison, who came to the station in 1983. Sharon Hibner Maines was the main anchor at cross town KLBK-TV from 1975-82 until she left for KAMC, where she would co-anchor the evening newscasts there until 1989. Between her departure from KAMC and her arrival at KCBD in 1996, she worked in public relations for Furr's Supermarkets. She resurfaced at KAMC and later came to KCBD. Maines, the wife of noted local musician Kenny Maines, is only one of a handful of media personalities (along with Texas Tech football color commentator John Harris, who served as KCBD's sports director from 1989 to 1995; and current KAMC evening anchor Bryan Mudd, who served as a KCBD sports anchor in the late 1990s) to have anchored either news, sports, or weather at all of Lubbock's Big Three affiliates.

One-time weather anchor Clyde Robert "Bob" Stephens was founder of 99.5 FM KWGN in Abernathy, Texas. It was later called KWGO and is nowadays Lubbock's KQBR. Former sports anchor Bob Howell was a co-founder of a Texas oriented sports channel for cable that is now at the heart of the present day Fox Sports Southwest network.

KCBD broadcast Dr. Red Duke's syndicated medical reports to viewers on the South Plains for much of the 1980s and 1990s.

Starting with the 1990–91 season, KCBD-TV, in conjunction with Methodist Hospital, produced a weekly program titled Health Matters. Hosted by evening co-anchor and health reporter Karin McCay, the program focused on a single health-related topic and featured interviews with medical practitioners from a wide array of specialties. Airing Saturdays at 5 p.m., the program was telecast for the first half of the decade. The program can effectively be viewed as a long-form version of McCay's "Healthwise" segments that have appeared during the station's evening newscasts since the early 1980s.

== Technical information ==
=== Subchannels ===
The station's signal is multiplexed:

Subchannels of KCBD
Channel	Res.	Short name	Programming
11.1	1080i	KCBD	NBC
11.2	480i	Outlaw	Outlaw
11.3	480i	Grit	Grit
11.4	480i	Escape	Ion Mystery
11.5	480i	LAFF	Laff
11.6	480i	BUSTED	Busted
11.7	480i	IONPLUS	Ion Plus

In April 2005, KCBD along with other Raycom-owned NBC affiliates began carrying NBC Weather Plus known as "NewsChannel 11 Weather Plus" on their DT2 subchannel feeds, the affiliation lasted until December 2008 when Weather Plus ceased operations due to NBCUniversal's purchase of The Weather Channel. KCBD along with fellow NBC affiliate KAMR-TV in Amarillo were the only two stations carrying the network in the southern Texas Panhandle. A year later in 2006, the station began offering The Tube Music Network on digital subchannel 11.3, that affiliation lasted until 2007 when The Tube ceased operations.

=== Analog-to-digital conversion ===
KCBD shut down its analog signal, over VHF channel 11, on June 12, 2009, the official date on which full-power television stations in the United States transitioned from analog to digital broadcasts under federal mandate. The station's digital signal relocated from its pre-transition VHF channel 9 to channel 11.
