= KJTV-CD =

Television station in Wolfforth, Texas

- Wolfforth–Lubbock, Texas; United States
- City: Wolfforth, Texas
- Channels: Digital: 33 (UHF); Virtual: 32
- Branding: Fox 34 News Now

Programming
- Affiliations: 32.1: Independent; for others, see § Subchannels

Ownership
- Owner: Gray Media; (Gray Television Licensee, LLC)
- Sister stations: KJTV-TV, KCBD, KLCW-TV, KABI-LD, KLBB-LD, KXTQ-CD, KMYL-LD

History
- Founded: July 29, 1988
- First air date: May 17, 1990
- Former call signs: K62DG (1988–2001); K32FF (2001–2002); KJTV-CA (2002–2011); KJTV-LD (2007–2011)
- Former channel number: Analog: 62 (UHF, 1988–2001), 32 (UHF, 2001–2011)
- Former affiliations: Fox (via KJTV-TV, 1990–2001); Local Accuweather Channel (2001–2006)
- Call sign meaning: Same as KJTV-TV

Technical information
- Licensing authority: FCC
- Facility ID: 168090
- Class: CD
- ERP: 15 kW
- HAAT: 263.8 m (865 ft)
- Transmitter coordinates: 33°30′8.3″N 101°52′21.3″W
- Translator(s): K26PJ-D Lubbock, TX; K19KT-D Hobbs, NM

Links
- Public license information: Public file; LMS
- Website: www.fox34.com

KJTV-CD (channel 32) is a low-power, Class A news-formatted independent television station licensed to Wolfforth, Texas, United States, serving the Lubbock area. It is owned by Gray Media alongside NBC affiliate KCBD (channel 11), CW+ affiliate KLCW-TV (channel 22), Fox affiliate KJTV-TV (channel 34), and four other low-power stations. The stations share studios at 98th Street and University Avenue in south Lubbock, where KJTV-CD's transmitter is also located.

== History ==
The station was founded in 2001 as an AccuWeather Channel affiliate. It is unique because it is broadcast on two channels in the Lubbock area, channel 32.1 in HD and is rebroadcast in SD on channel 34.2 of KJTV-TV. Local original programming on the station totals 65 hours per week.

On January 7, 2011, the station's digital channel was licensed under the call sign KJTV-LD. On October 21, 2011, the digital channel changed its call sign to KJTV-CD to reflect its class A status.

The station's analog license was cancelled and the KJTV-CA call sign deleted by the Federal Communications Commission on December 13, 2011. On December 31, 2013, KJTV-CD added WeatherNation TV to the station's second digital subchannel. The channel is known as "Fox 34 WeatherNation".

== Technical information ==
=== Subchannels ===
The station's signal is multiplexed:

Subchannels of KJTV-CD
Channel	Res.	Short name	Programming
32.1	720p	KJTV-CD	Fox 34 News Now
32.2	480i	WX	WeatherNation
32.3	480i	DABL	Dabl
