= KJTV-TV =

Television station in Lubbock, Texas

- Lubbock, Texas; United States
- Channels: Digital: 11 (VHF); Virtual: 34
- Branding: Fox 34; KCBD NewsChannel 11 on Fox 34

Programming
- Affiliations: 34.1: Fox; 34.2: Fox 34 News Now (News/Ind.); 34.3: Ion Television

Ownership
- Owner: Gray Media; (Gray Television Licensee, LLC)
- Sister stations: KJTV-CD, KCBD, KLCW-TV, KABI-LD, KLBB-LD, KMYL-LD, KXTQ-CD

History
- First air date: December 11, 1981
- Former call signs: KJAA (1981–1985); KJTV (1985–2000)
- Former channel numbers: Analog: 34 (UHF, 1981–2009); Digital: 35 (UHF, until 2025)
- Former affiliations: Independent (1981–1986)
- Call sign meaning: simplified from previous callsign KJAA-TV

Technical information
- Licensing authority: FCC
- Facility ID: 55031
- ERP: 41 kW
- HAAT: 234 m (768 ft)
- Transmitter coordinates: 33°32′29.9″N 101°50′13.6″W
- Translator(s): KLCW-TV 34.34 Wolfforth; K19KT-D Hobbs, NM

Links
- Public license information: Public file; LMS
- Website: www.fox34lubbock.com

KJTV-TV (channel 34) is a television station in Lubbock, Texas, United States, affiliated with the Fox network. It is owned by Gray Media alongside NBC affiliate KCBD (channel 11), CW+ affiliate KLCW-TV (channel 22), and five low-power stations. The stations share studios at 98th Street and University Avenue in south Lubbock; KJTV-TV's transmitter is located near the interchange of I-27 and Slaton Highway.

KJTV-TV was a charter Fox affiliate, having broadcast the network since its launch on October 9, 1986. It was also the flagship television property of locally owned Ramar Communications until late 2020 (see below).

== History ==
Channel 34 first appeared in 1967 as KKBC-TV, owned by the KB Company (Chester and Clarance Kissell), operating from a control room and transmitter at the tallest downtown building. It had approximately 25 kilowatts of visual power from an antenna about 320 feet (98 m) above average terrain. The station signed on with a few films, some NBC and CBS programs declined by KCBD and KLBK-TV, and The Mike Douglas Show. Local engineer Alvie Ivey built the facility from used equipment gathered from stations in the region.

Soon after channel 34 signed on, a station on channel 28 signed on with much better facilities. KSEL-TV (now ABC affiliate KAMC) had 2 megawatts of power, an 875-foot (267 m) tower located in south Lubbock near other station's towers, and had support from sister stations KSEL (950 AM, now KTTU) and KSEL-FM (93.7, now KLBB-FM) (both of which, ironically, are today sister stations to KJTV-TV). This provided the impetus to move KKBC to a taller location with greater power.

New owners took over channel 34 and a taller tower was built at 98th and University Avenue. Local station KWGO-FM (now KQBR) rented a spot on the tower as it was going up. The improved KKBC-TV developed power of more than 4 megawatts. However, KSEL still had the lead, as it obtained a full-time ABC affiliation, while channel 34 affiliated with the Spanish International Network (by bicycled tapes) and changed calls to KMXN-TV. The station continued until sometime in 1973. Legend has it that the board of directors met at the station, assessed their shaky financial footing, and ordered the station shut down on the way out. The film on the air was interrupted, and the station signed off. The license was then returned to the Federal Communications Commission (FCC).

The tower and land were later acquired by Ramar for use by a radio station the company was starting, KTEZ (now KONE). After a few years' operations, Ramar decided to file for a new channel 34 license using the old tower, feed line, and antenna. That was granted around 1980–81, and on December 11, 1981, KJAA was launched as an independent station. On August 16, 1985, the station changed its call letters to KJTV, which were previously used by what is now KCIT, the Fox affiliate in nearby Amarillo. On October 9, 1986, it joined the fledgling Fox Broadcasting Company as one of its charter stations. For a time, the station secondarily aired programming from the Prime Time Entertainment Network. On October 2, 2000, KJTV added a -TV suffix to its call letters.

For a time in the early 1990s, the station aired Live with Regis and Kathie Lee (now Live with Kelly and Mark). Prior to the Fox network beginning seven-nights-per-week programming in 1993, locally produced programming included The Cowboy Picture Show, a Wednesday night airing of a Western film that usually had a local sponsor (e.g., KLLL-FM); and a prime time movie aired most weeknights at 7 p.m., not unlike other Fox affiliates in the Central Time Zone during these years.

On October 19, 2020, Ramar announced that it would sell KJTV to SagamoreHill Broadcasting for $5 million. Gray Television (owner of KCBD) would provide services to KJTV through a shared services agreement. Concurrently, Gray would acquire KJTV's sister station KLCW (and its accompanied low-power stations) for $10 million. The sale was completed on December 31.

On August 1, 2025, Gray Media announced it would purchase KJTV-TV and KJTV-CD, along with sister station WLTZ in Columbus, Georgia, from SagamoreHill Broadcasting. Gray applied for failing station waivers. The sale was approved by the FCC on May 6, 2026, including authority for Gray to own three TV station licenses in the Lubbock market, and completed two days later.

== Sports programming ==
Starting with the 1989–90 season, KJTV became the exclusive broadcaster of Southwest Conference athletics for Lubbock and the South Plains; prior to the fall of 1989, it had split broadcast rights with KCBD. Occasionally, however, KJTV did produce its own sports telecasts. Namely, in September 1986, Texas Tech's football team traveled to Miami to take on the University of Miami (Florida). Former Dallas Cowboys wide receiver Drew Pearson provided color commentary; for many Cowboy fans across the South Plains, it was a welcome sign, as the Cowboys would post their first losing season since 1964. The Red Raiders could not deliver on the possibility that they could establish themselves as a national power, as Texas Tech lost 61–11.

Since 1994, it has been the South Plains' broadcaster of National Football Conference games. Prior to 1994, KLBK aired NFC games, including those of the Dallas Cowboys.

== News operation ==
In 2000, KJTV launched a local newscast at 9 p.m. using a virtual set (which was also used for news on KXTQ-LP). Concurrent with their inauguration of a new news department and the first one in Lubbock in more than 30 years, they also introduced a new logo, which is still in use to this day. To give South Plains viewers a sense of familiarity, they lured former KAMC anchor Jeff Klotzman away from KNXV-TV in Phoenix to anchor the newscasts. In recent years, Klotzman anchored the weekday newscasts alongside former KLBK and KOSA-TV newsman Kurt Kiser. However, Klotzman retired after the February 28, 2019, newscast after the Lubbock Independent School District hired him as part of their community relations department. As he had also retired from the station's news directorship, chief meteorologist Matt Ernst replaced him in said capacity.

On October 1, 2008. KJTV launched a morning newscast titled Good Day Lubbock that, as of 2018, airs from 5–9 a.m. weekday mornings. KJTV discontinued its virtual set in 2008 and again in 2017. In 2010, KJTV launched the now-canceled Ag Day Lubbock, a daily local newscast covering agricultural issues complementing the syndicated farm news show Ag Day, which preceded it.

In 2012, KJTV added three hours of news and information from 6 to9 p.m. on Fox 34 News Now, 32.1 KJTV-CD/34.2 KJTV-TV.

On June 27, 2022, KCBD officially took over all aspects of KJTV's newscasts, including changing the name over to KCBD NewsChannel 11 on Fox 34. This came after KCBD moved into KJTV's studios at 98th Street and University Avenue in south Lubbock. As a result, KJTV's morning newscast, Good Day Lubbock, moved from 5–9 a.m. to a later slot of 7–10 a.m. while KCBD's weekday morning newscast, Daybreak Today, maintained its 5–7 a.m. window. Also, the 9 p.m. newscast was renamed KCBD NewsChannel 11 at 9:00 on Fox 34.

On May 27, 2026, James Eppler, a film critic who hosts KJTV's morning show, Good Day Lubbock, reported on a recent tie-in between the South Korean boy band BTS and Oreo which resulted in the creation of hotteok-flavored cookies; he remarked that the cookies have 13 unique designs which spell out a message reading "death to America". Fans of the boy band issued a scathing critique of Eppler and called for his firing over the comments, which they deemed racist and senophobic.

== Technical information ==
=== Subchannels ===
The station's signal is multiplexed:

Subchannels of KJTV-TV
Channel	Res.	Short name	Programming
34.1	720p	FOX34	Fox
34.2	480i	FOX34NN	Fox 34 News Now (KJTV-CD)
34.3	480i	ION	Ion

Simulcast of subchannels of another station

=== Analog-to-digital conversion ===
KJTV-TV shut down its analog signal, over UHF channel 34, on February 17, 2009, the original target date on which full-power television stations in the United States were to transition from analog to digital broadcasts under federal mandate (which was later pushed back to June 12, 2009). The station's digital signal remained on its pre-transition UHF channel 35, using virtual channel 34.

== See also ==
- KUPT (TV)
- KLCW-TV
