= KLCW-TV =

Television station in Wolfforth, Texas

- Wolfforth–Lubbock, Texas; United States
- City: Wolfforth, Texas
- Channels: Digital: 23 (UHF); Virtual: 22
- Branding: Lubbock CW 22/1; MyLubbockTV (22.2)

Programming
- Affiliations: 22.1: CW+; 22.2: Independent with MyNetworkTV; for others, see § Subchannels

Ownership
- Owner: Gray Media; (Gray Television Licensee, LLC)
- Sister stations: KCBD, KJTV-TV, KJTV-CD, KLBB-LD, KMYL-LD, KXTQ-CD

History
- Founded: February 23, 1998
- First air date: February 9, 2001
- Former call signs: KUPT (2001–2005); KWBZ-TV (2005–2006)
- Former channel numbers: Analog: 22 (UHF, 2001–2009); Digital: 43 (UHF, until 2018)
- Former affiliations: UPN (2001–December 2005); The WB (January–September 2006)
- Call sign meaning: Lubbock CW

Technical information
- Licensing authority: FCC
- Facility ID: 77719
- ERP: 200 kW
- HAAT: 282.1 m (926 ft)
- Transmitter coordinates: 33°30′8.3″N 101°52′21.3″W

Links
- Public license information: Public file; LMS
- Website: www.yourcwtv.com/partners/lubbock

KLCW-TV (channel 22) is a television station licensed to Wolfforth, Texas, United States, serving the Lubbock area as an affiliate of The CW Plus. It is owned by Gray Media alongside NBC affiliate KCBD (channel 11), Fox affiliate KJTV-TV (channel 34), and five low-power stations. The stations share studios at 98th Street and University Avenue in south Lubbock, where KLCW-TV's transmitter is also located.

== History ==
Prior to 2006, what was then called KWBZ operated solely as a local cable TV station and was owned and operated by KCBD-TV, the local NBC affiliate. At that time, channel 22 was occupied by KUPT, an affiliate of UPN. On January 1, 2006, after the station was acquired by Ramar Communications, KUPT moved to channel 14 in Lubbock (now MyNetworkTV affiliate KMYL-LD), and the WB affiliation moved to channel 22.

KWBZ-TV became a full power broadcast affiliate of The WB (via The WB 100+ Station Group as on cable) on January 1, 2006. Twenty-four days later, Warner Bros. Television, which owned The WB, and CBS Corporation, owner of UPN (channel 22's former network as KUPT), announced a merger of those two networks to take effect on September 18, 2006; the new network operating under the name of "The CW". KWBZ signed on to become a CW affiliate, resulting in new call letters (KLCW-TV was adopted on June 30, 2006) and a rebranding (Lubbock CW). The station's feed is still affiliated with The CW Plus with local inserts and advertising placed by KJTV-TV and Ramar.

On October 19, 2020, Ramar announced that it would sell KLCW (and its accompanied low-power stations) to Gray Television (owner of KCBD) for $10 million. Concurrently, SagamoreHill Broadcasting would acquire sister station KJTV for $5 million. Gray would provide services to KJTV through a shared services agreement. The sale was completed on December 31.

== Technical information ==
=== Subchannels ===
The station's signal is multiplexed:

Subchannels of KLCW-TV
Channel	Res.	Short name	Programming
22.1	720p	KLCW TV	The CW Plus
22.2	480i	My LBB	KMYL-LD (Independent with MyNetworkTV)
22.3	480i	Crime	True Crime Network
22.4	480i	QUEST	Quest
22.5	480i	QVC	QVC
22.6	480i	HSN	HSN
34.34	720p	KCBD	Fox (KJTV-TV)

Simulcast of subchannels of another station

=== Analog-to-digital conversion ===
Because it was granted an original construction permit after the FCC finalized the DTV allotment plan on April 21, 1997, the station did not receive a companion channel for a digital television station. Instead, on or before February 17, 2009, the original date of the digital TV conversion for full-power stations, KLCW-TV would be required to turn off its analog signal and turn on its digital signal (called a "flash-cut"). As of September 2008, the station's digital signal began broadcasting on its pre-transition UHF channel 43, using virtual channel 22.

== See also ==
- KJTV-TV
- KUPT
