= KMYL-LD =

Television station in Lubbock, Texas

- Lubbock, Texas; United States
- Channels: Digital: 22 (UHF); Virtual: 14
- Branding: My Lubbock TV

Programming
- Affiliations: 14.1: Independent with MyNetworkTV; for others, see § Subchannels

Ownership
- Owner: Gray Media; (Gray Television Licensee, LLC)
- Sister stations: KCBD, KJTV-TV, KJTV-CD, KLCW-TV, KLBB-LD, KXTQ-CD

History
- Founded: June 8, 1986
- First air date: January 4, 1989
- Former call signs: K22BG (1989–1995); KUPT-LP (1995–2006); KMYL-LP (2006–2008)
- Former channel numbers: Analog: 22 (UHF, 1989–2001), 14 (UHF, 2001–2008); Digital: 15 (UHF, 2007–2008)
- Former affiliations: Independent (1989–1995); UPN (1995–2006)
- Call sign meaning: MyNetworkTV Lubbock

Technical information
- Licensing authority: FCC
- Facility ID: 168087
- Class: LD
- ERP: 15 kW
- HAAT: 263.8 m (865 ft)
- Transmitter coordinates: 33°30′8.3″N 101°52′21.3″W
- Translator(s): KLCW-TV 22.2 Wolfforth, TX

Links
- Public license information: LMS
- Website: www.mylubbocktv.com

KMYL-LD (channel 14) is a low-power television station in Lubbock, Texas, United States. It is programmed primarily as an independent station, but maintains a secondary affiliation with MyNetworkTV. KMYL-LD is owned by Gray Media alongside NBC affiliate KCBD (channel 11), CW+ affiliate KLCW-TV (channel 22), Fox affiliate KJTV-TV (channel 34), and four other low-power stations. The stations share studios at 98th Street and University Avenue in south Lubbock, where KMYL-LD's transmitter is also located.

In addition to its own digital signal, KMYL-LD is simulcast on the second subchannel of KLCW-TV in order to reach the entire market.

== Subchannels ==
The station's signal is multiplexed:

Subchannels of KMYL-LD
Channel	Res.	Short name	Programming
14.1	720p	KMYLLD	Main KMYL-LD programming
14.2	480i	MeTOONS	MeTV Toons
14.3	480i	COZI	Cozi TV
14.4	480i	JEWELRY	Jewelry TV
