= WIBR =

Radio station in Baton Rouge, Louisiana (1948–2020)

Coordinates: 30°28′25″N 91°13′34″W

- Baton Rouge, Louisiana; United States
- Broadcast area: Baton Rouge metropolitan area
- Frequency: 1300 kHz

Programming
- Format: Defunct (formerly Sports talk)

Ownership
- Owner: Cumulus Media; (Radio License Holding CBC, LLC)
- Sister stations: KQXL, WRQQ, WEMX, WXOK

History
- First air date: 1948; 78 years ago
- Call sign meaning: W I Baton Rouge

Technical information
- Facility ID: 61275
- Class: B
- Power: 5,000 watts (day); 1,000 watts (night)

WIBR (1300 AM) was an ESPN Radio affiliated sports talk radio station licensed to Baton Rouge, Louisiana. The station broadcast with power of 5,000 watts day, 1,000 watts night and was owned by Citadel Broadcasting Corporation. Its studios were located downtown and the transmitter tower was in Port Allen, Louisiana.

== History ==
WIBR signed on the air in 1948 as a locally owned Middle of the Road (MOR)/Full service outlet. During the late 1960s and early 1970s, the station was known by its jingles as "WIBR, The Voice of Baton Rouge - We're Playing Your Song". Another jingle stated "The Shack by the Track in Baton Rouge". WIBR will forever be the radio station that connected to the music of the time.

After changing hands and formats in the 1980s and 1990s (including a period broadcasting Sports), the station switched to a news/talk format in 2002.

The talk format ended on November 15, 2005 and was briefly replaced with urban music, until WIBR debuted an African-American oriented "urban talk" format. The station featured a lineup of syndicated talk shows mostly produced by Radio One, including a program hosted by Rev. Al Sharpton.

On February 19, 2007, the station switched to a sports talk format. In addition to the ESPN Radio programming, the station aired four local sports talk shows The Pressbox Show, with host Jimmy Ott, THE RANT presented by TigerDroppings.com, The Water Boys with Tony King is Funny and Eric Lacassin, and The Coach's Corner with Joe the Pro and Coach Bennett.

WIBR went off the air in August 2012. On January 31, 2020, WIBR's owner requested cancellation of its license, and the Federal Communications Commission cancelled the station's license on February 4, 2020.
