= Mike the Tiger =

Mascot of Louisiana State University

Coordinates: 30°24′48″N 91°11′6″W

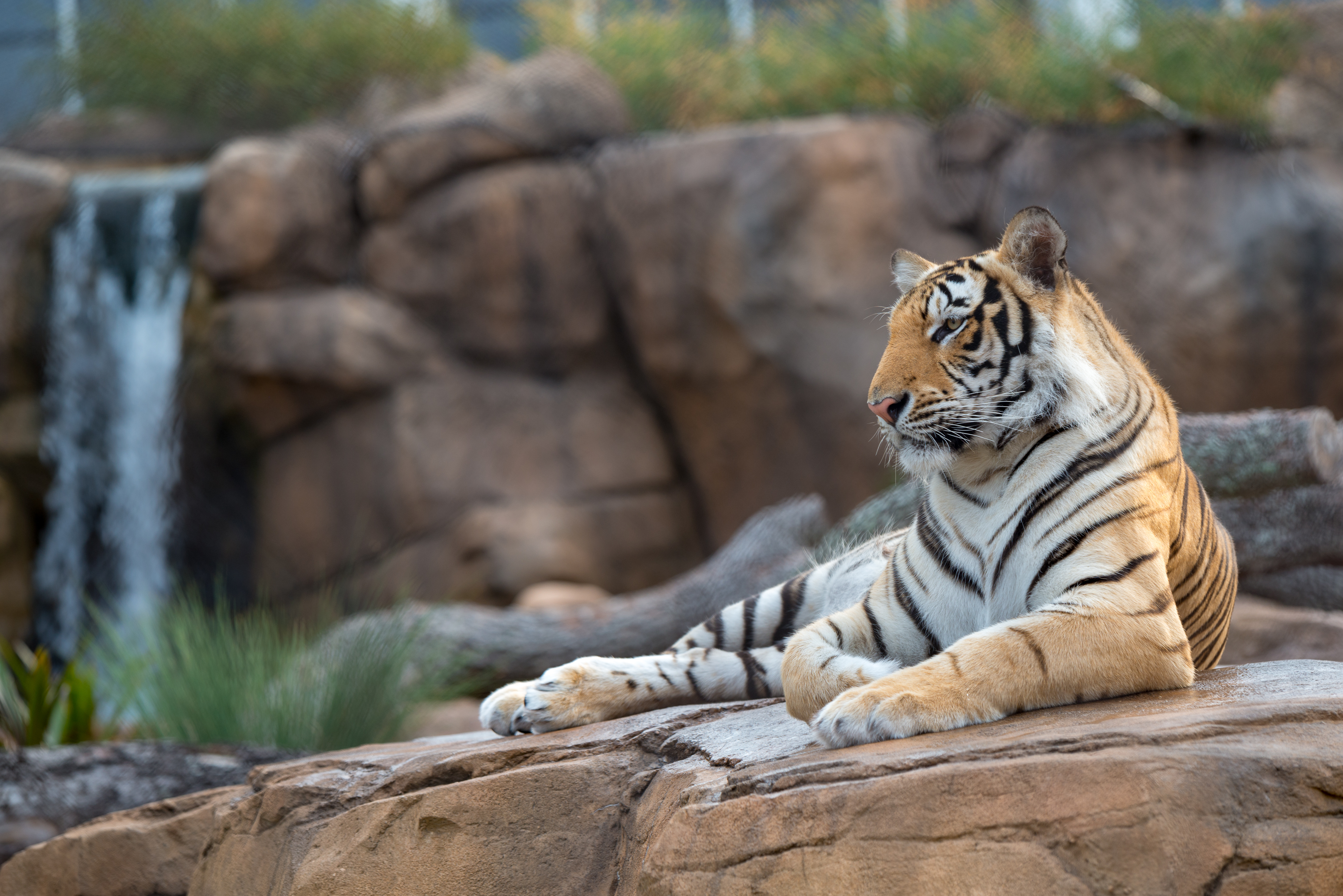
- Mike the Tiger in tiger habitat
- University: Louisiana State University
- Conference: SEC
- Description: Royal Bengal tiger
- Origin of name: In honor of athletic trainer Chellis "Mike" Chambers
- First seen: October 21, 1936 (90 years ago)

Mike the Tiger is the mascot of Louisiana State University (LSU) in Baton Rouge, Louisiana, and serves as the graphic image of LSU sports. Mike is the name of both the live and costumed mascots.

By tradition the tiger is a live Bengal tiger, although the current mascot and his two immediate predecessors are mixed-breeds. Mike V was a Bengal-Indochinese mix, Mike VI was a Bengal-Siberian hybrid, and Mike VII is also a Bengal–Siberian mix.

LSU teams are called the Fighting Tigers and Lady Tigers, with "Lady Tigers" used only for women's teams in sports that are also sponsored for men, and the university's football team plays its home games in Tiger Stadium. LSU first adopted its "Tigers" nickname in the fall of 1896. The moniker references Confederate era military regiments; the military brigade led by Harry T. Hays which participated in the New Orleans Massacre of 1866; the Louisiana troops of Robert E. Lee's Army of Northern Virginia became known as the Tigers during the Civil War after two New Orleans brigades, the Tiger Rifles and the Washington Artillery (whose logo featured a tiger's head since 1838).

== History of Mike the Tiger ==
=== Mike I (1936–1956) ===
Born on October 10, 1935, the first Mike was purchased from the Little Rock Zoo with money raised by collecting 25 cents from each LSU student for a total of $750. Originally named Sheik, the new mascot was renamed in honor of Mike Chambers, LSU's athletic trainer at the time, who was the person most responsible for bringing him to the school. (It was later discovered that "Sheik" may have been fond of his original name, because even years later, handlers could get him to roar just by calling "Sheik!") Mike assumed his duties as the living symbol of LSU only three days after arriving on campus on October 21, 1936. In the 1950s, Mike was kidnapped by Tulane fans before a Tiger-Green Wave football game. He was found, and returned safely in New Orleans—he and his cage had been sprayed Tulane green. The original Mike lived 20 years before dying of kidney disease in 1956. He has been displayed in LSU's Natural Sciences Museum in Baton Rouge.

=== Mike II (1956–1958) ===
A few days after Mike I's death, a resolution endorsing the purchase of another tiger was introduced in the Louisiana legislature and a fund was set up by LSU students to underwrite the cost. Mike II had a short but somewhat mysterious life. He was born on February 28, 1956, at the Audubon Zoo in New Orleans and was chosen because his paws were larger than those of the other cubs. He was unveiled on September 29, 1956, during the opening game of the new football season. Legend has it that less than a month after his arrival at LSU, Mike II died of pneumonia, at only eight months of age, during a six-game losing streak and that a second Mike II was secretly brought in as a ringer. To explain Mike's absence, and after much rumor, the LSU student newspaper, The Daily Reveille, printed a statement that the young tiger needed time alone to adjust to his new home and position as mascot, with its attendant excitement. All rumors of Mike II's death and replacement were denied, and the school claimed that he had finally adjusted. On May 15, 1958, however, less than two years after his debut, Mike II (or his impostor) died at the Audubon Zoo due to pneumonia, while recovering from multiple fractures to his left rear leg.

=== Mike III (1958–1976) ===
Mike III was born on November 26, 1957, and arrived from the Seattle Zoo just in time for LSU's 1958 National Championship football season. During Mike III's 18-year reign, LSU won three Southeastern Conference football championships (1958, 1961, 1970) and eight of 13 bowl games. Mike III died of old age in 1976 after the only losing LSU football season of his lifetime. The mascot's death affected the students and faculty so greatly that the vet at the time, W. Sheldon Bivin, said he would never allow another tiger to die on campus.

=== Mike IV (1976–1990) ===
Mike IV, originally called Jerry, was born at Busch Gardens in Tampa, Florida in 1974. He was donated by August A. Busch III and was two years old when he came to LSU in August 1976. One memorable incident involving Mike IV began in the early-morning hours of November 28, 1981 when pranksters cut the locks on Mike's cage. The tiger roamed freely for hours, attacked a small tree, and appeared to be enjoying himself before becoming trapped in the Track Stadium near his cage. Three tranquilizer shots later, the wandering mascot was returned to his home without further incident and awoke without ill effects. Mike IV reigned for 14 years and retired in 1990 to the Baton Rouge Zoo where he lived until his death in 1995 at the age of 21, the oldest of the tigers serving as LSU's mascot.

=== Mike V (1990–2007) ===
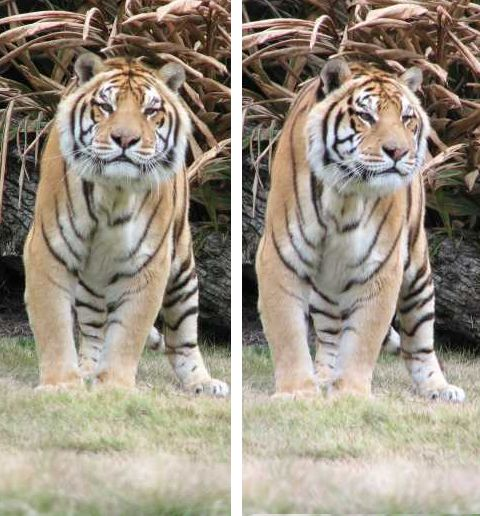
Mike V, December 2006

Mike V was considered to have the best personality of all the tigers that have served as LSU's symbol. Originally named Stevie, he was donated by Dr. Thomas and Caroline Atchison of the Animal House Zoological Park in Moulton, Alabama. Born on October 19, 1989, the 7-pound (3.2 kg) baby tiger was introduced to LSU fans at a basketball game in February 1990. In his 17-year reign, Mike V saw an LSU football team win another National Championship (in 2003) and received both a new trailer and a massive renovation of his enclosure.

In March 2007, Mike V officially began a three-stage retirement. His personal vet, David Baker, cited his age and health as reasons. Mike V retained his mascot status and lived in his on-campus habitat until his death.

Mike V died on May 18, 2007, at 2:23 AM, which coincided with the undergraduate commencement ceremonies. The cause of death was renal failure.

=== Mike VI (2007–2016) ===
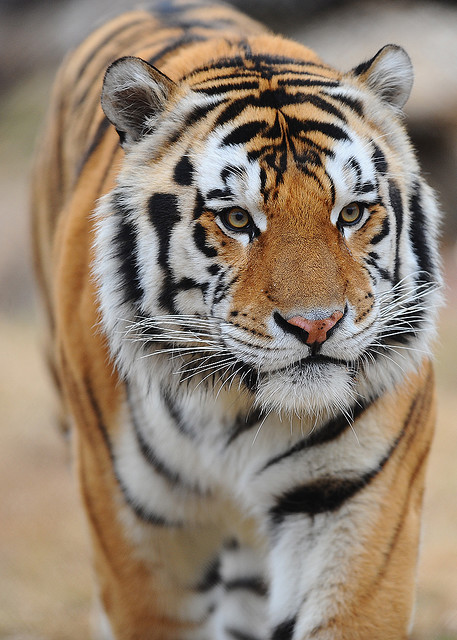
Mike VI

After Mike V's death, PETA contacted the university and urged it not to replace him with a new tiger.

However, LSU chancellor Sean O'Keefe rejected PETA's request by stating that LSU would acquire a new tiger. O'Keefe further defended LSU's decision by noting that four of the previous five Mikes lived to be at least 17 years, nearly twice the normal 8–10 year lifespan of tigers in the wild. O'Keefe further explained that tigers were currently a critically endangered species in the wild, and any attempt to preserve them as a species would require some level of raising them in captivity, such as at LSU's veterinary school.

LSU did not wish to buy a tiger but instead sought for one to be donated to the school. On July 27, 2007, WBRZ ABC News 2 announced that LSU had located a tiger at Great Cats of (Idaville) Indiana, an Indiana-based large cat and carnivore rescue facility.

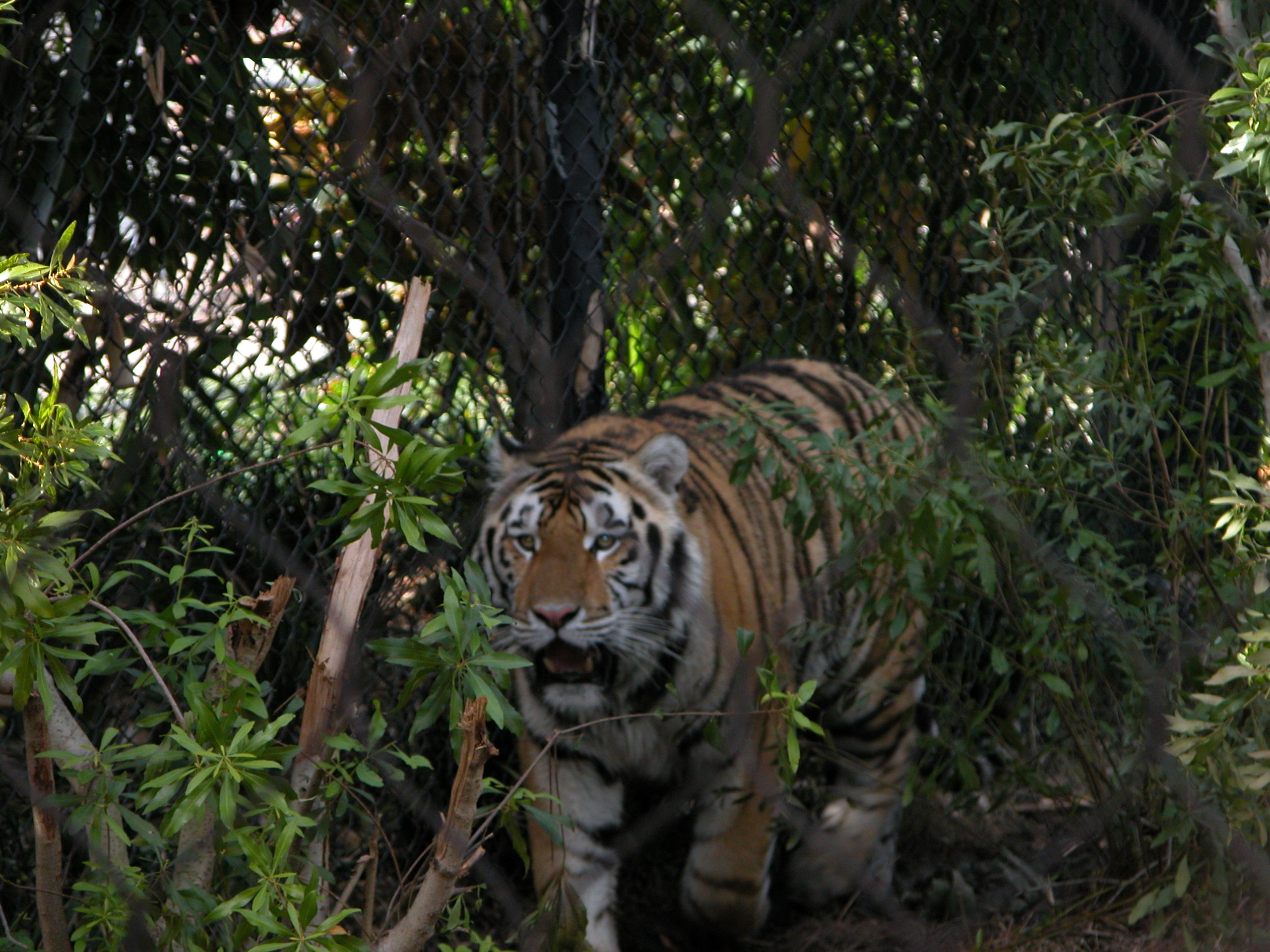
Mike VI

"Roscoe" arrived in Baton Rouge on Saturday, August 25, 2007, after a plane ride from Indiana and was kept quarantined in the "night house" in the LSU habitat, away from the public. On August 31, 2007, LSU officials decided that the tiger was adjusting well and allowed him into the public habitat during morning outings. He was returned to the night house each evening. On his first outing on September 1, 2007, LSU staff invited members of the media and the public to view and take photographs of the tiger.

On September 8, 2007, LSU staff acknowledged that "He's Mike VI" in a press release. A ceremony dedicating the tiger as officially "Mike VI" took place on September 14, 2007, Mike VI was to make his Death Valley debut at the September 22 game against the University of South Carolina, but LSU Veterinarian David Baker felt that a day game would be rough for the new tiger, delaying his anticipated debut until the October 6, 2007 night game against the University of Florida.

In Mike VI's first year as the LSU tiger, the LSU Tigers football team won the BCS National Championship for the 2007 college football season.

By 2015, Mike VI was a 10-year old Siberian-Bengal mix male weighing over 420 pounds (190 kg). The product of an "unintended breeding" at Great Cats, University staff believed his youth, size and temperament may give the athletic department a "more ferocious mascot much sooner than watching a cub grow up at LSU." Estimates by LSU Veterinary staff were that Mike VI may top out at 600 lb (270 kg) or more, making him LSU's largest tiger mascot ever.

On May 23, 2016, LSU issued a press release stating that Mike VI had been diagnosed with a spindle cell sarcoma, a type of cancer, which later spread. LSU announced on September 6 that despite treatment, the tiger's cancer was terminal, and that he would be expected to live at most two years. Mike VI would remain in his on-campus habitat, and would no longer attend games. On October 5, 2016, it was announced that Mike VI's cancer had returned and spread to his head. Vets at the LSU Veterinarian School announced that he had one to two months to live. Six days later, he was euthanized.

=== Mike VII (2017–present) ===
Following the death of Mike VI, LSU issued statements that they intended to seek another tiger to become Mike VII, in a similar manner to previous Mikes: to be donated to the university and not purchased or bred; and, like the acquisition of his would-be predecessors, that decision was also met with controversy.

On January 19, 2017, LSU announced a timeline concerning searching for a tiger to become Mike VII, hoping to have him join an incoming freshman class in August 2017. Additionally, they announced the would-be Mike VII would no longer visit the stadium during game days. The school also attempted to have Mike's habitat accredited as a tiger sanctuary.

On August 1, LSU announced that it had located a 9-month-old male Siberian–Bengal hybrid tiger that may become Mike VII. The tiger was donated from an Okeechobee, Florida sanctuary that had changed owners and practices after a prosecution of the previous owner. The tiger, named Harvey, arrived on campus on August 15 to begin a one-week quarantine before officially becoming Mike VII. LSU announced that Harvey had become the official Mike VII on August 21, the first day of classes in the fall semester. Mike VII oversaw LSU Football's first College Football Playoff National Title in his third season on campus.

Mike VII received two doses of the COVID-19 vaccine in the summer of 2021.

Title	Reign	Given name	Lifespan	Subspecies	Place of interment	Football record *
Mike I	October 24, 1936 – June 29, 1956 (upon death)	Sheik	October 10, 1935 (at Little Rock Zoo, Little Rock, Arkansas)–June 29, 1956 (of kidney disease, in Mike the Tiger's Cage, Baton Rouge, Louisiana)	Bengal	Mounted remains displayed in LSU Museum of Natural Science, Baton Rouge, Louisiana	109–76–13 (.583)
Mike II	A) September 29, 1956–Early October 1956 (upon death)	Not specified by university	February 28, 1956 (at Audubon Zoo, New Orleans)–Early October 1956 (of pneumonia, in Mike the Tiger's Cage, Baton Rouge, Louisiana)	Bengal	Remains informally buried next to unspecified willow tree along Mississippi River, Baton Rouge, Louisiana	0–1–0 (.000) or 0–2–0 (.000) **
Mike II	B) Early November 1956–May 15, 1958 (upon death)	Not specified by university	February 26, 1956 (at Woodland Park Zoo, Seattle)–May 15, 1958 (of pneumonia, while recuperating from multiple fractures of left rear leg, in Audubon Zoo, New Orleans)	Bengal	Not specified by university	7–6–0 (.538) or 8–6–0 (.571) or 8–7–0 (.533) **
Mike III	October 4, 1958 – August 12, 1976 (upon death)	Not specified by university	November 26, 1957 (at Woodland Park Zoo, Seattle)–August 12, 1976 (of old age, in LSU School of Veterinary Medicine, Baton Rouge, Louisiana)	Bengal	Remains were to be cremated but plans then changed to mount remains (due to medical procedures performed shortly before death and the tiger's advanced age in general, remains were unsuitable for mounting beyond head and shoulders); mounted head and shoulders formerly displayed in Gold Star Trophies, Baton Rouge, Louisiana but now displayed in unspecified private residence	131–48–7 (.723)
Mike IV	August 29, 1976–April 30, 1990 (upon retirement)	Jerry	May 15, 1974 (at Busch Gardens, Tampa)–March 3, 1995 (euthanized, due to multiple health issues, in Baton Rouge Zoo, Baton Rouge, Louisiana)	Bengal	Remains interred in Jack & Priscilla Andonie Museum, Baton Rouge, Louisiana	100–57–6 (.632)
Mike V	April 30, 1990–May 18, 2007 (upon death)	Stevie	October 19, 1989 (at Animal House Zoological Park, Moulton, Alabama)–May 18, 2007 (of kidney failure, due to anesthesia applied for otherwise successful surgery to treat pneumonia, in LSU School of Veterinary Medicine, Baton Rouge, Louisiana)	Bengal–Indochinese mix	Remains interred in Jack & Priscilla Andonie Museum, Baton Rouge, Louisiana	124–78–1 (.613)
Mike VI	September 14, 2007 – October 11, 2016 (upon death)	Roscoe	July 23, 2005 (at Great Cats of Indiana, Idaville, Indiana)–October 11, 2016 (euthanized, due to terminal spindle cell sarcoma in head, in Mike the Tiger Habitat night house, Baton Rouge, Louisiana)	Bengal–Siberian mix	Remains interred in Jack & Priscilla Andonie Museum, Baton Rouge, Louisiana	93–30 (.756)
Mike VII	August 21, 2017–Present	Harvey	September 13, 2016 (at Wild at Heart Wildlife Center, Okeechobee, Florida –Present	Bengal–Siberian mix	Not applicable	72-29 (Record as of 1/8/2025)

Notes: *—a superstition strongly tied to the line of Mikes is the success of the school's football program (LSU has won national championships during the first seasons of the reigns of Mike I, Mike III, and Mike VI, although the title under Mike I was not a consensus, despite being named champion by multiple selectors); **—contemporary accounts maintain the existence of only one tiger holding the title of Mike II, but modern research indicates the existence of two separate tigers; however, it is not immediately clear precisely when the reign of the first Mike II ended and the second Mike II began.

== Mike the Tiger Habitat ==
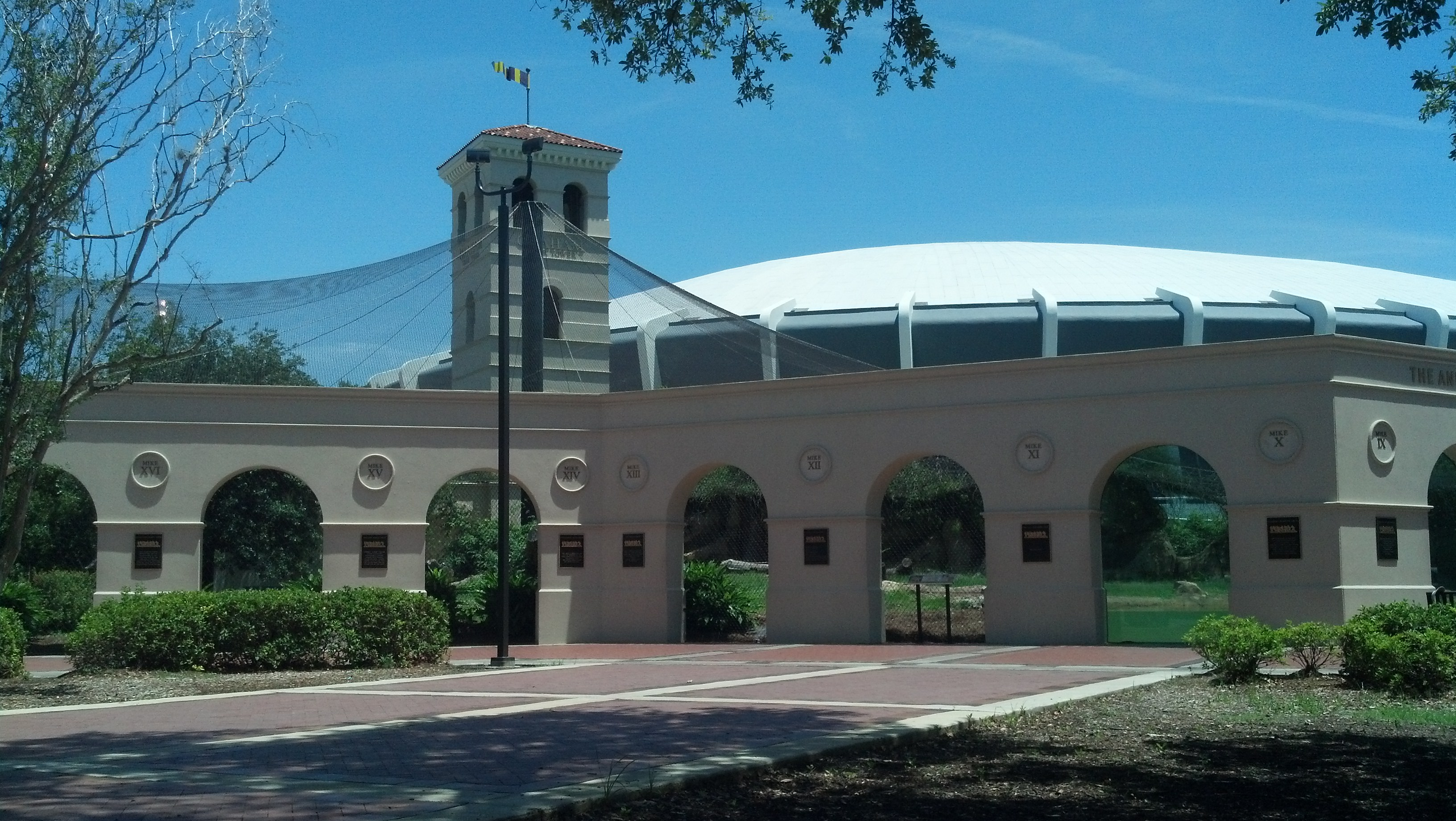
Mike the Tiger Habitat

In 2005, a new $3 million habitat was created for Mike. The Tiger Athletic Foundation (TAF) raised funds, entirely from private sources, to subsidize the construction project. The habitat (situated between Tiger Stadium and the Pete Maravich Assembly Center) features state-of-the-art technologies and includes among its amenities lush plantings, a waterfall, a flowing stream that empties into a wading pond, and rocky plateaus. The habitat ranks among the largest and finest tiger preserves in the country and expanded Mike's home from 2,000 to 15,000 square feet (1,400 m^{2}). It also features research, conservation, and husbandry programs, as well as educational, interpretive, and recreational activities. Mike's new home can be viewed via the live Tigercam.

== Traditions ==
- Until 2016, on home football game days, Mike's cage on wheels was topped by the LSU cheerleaders as it rode through Tiger Stadium before the start of the game, and was parked by the opponent's locker room at the southeast end of Tiger Stadium, forcing opposing players to pass by Mike's cage in order to reach their locker room (However, Mike is never forced into his trailer: if he does not go in on his own, he remains in his habitat. Mike VI was known for rarely entering his trailer). However, following the death of Mike VI in 2016, LSU announced that future Mikes will no longer leave their habitat.
- According to folklore, LSU will score a touchdown for every one of Mike's roars on game day.
- Many students seek to take a picture with Mike on graduation day wearing cap and gown.

=== Retirement ===
After the death of Mike III in 1976 while he was still LSU's active mascot, a three-stage retirement plan was instituted for the tigers:

- Stage 1: He no longer participates in pre-game events such as the roar before the game.
- Stage 2: He stops attending the games altogether.
- Stage 3: He retires to another location.

== Mike the Tiger Mascot ==
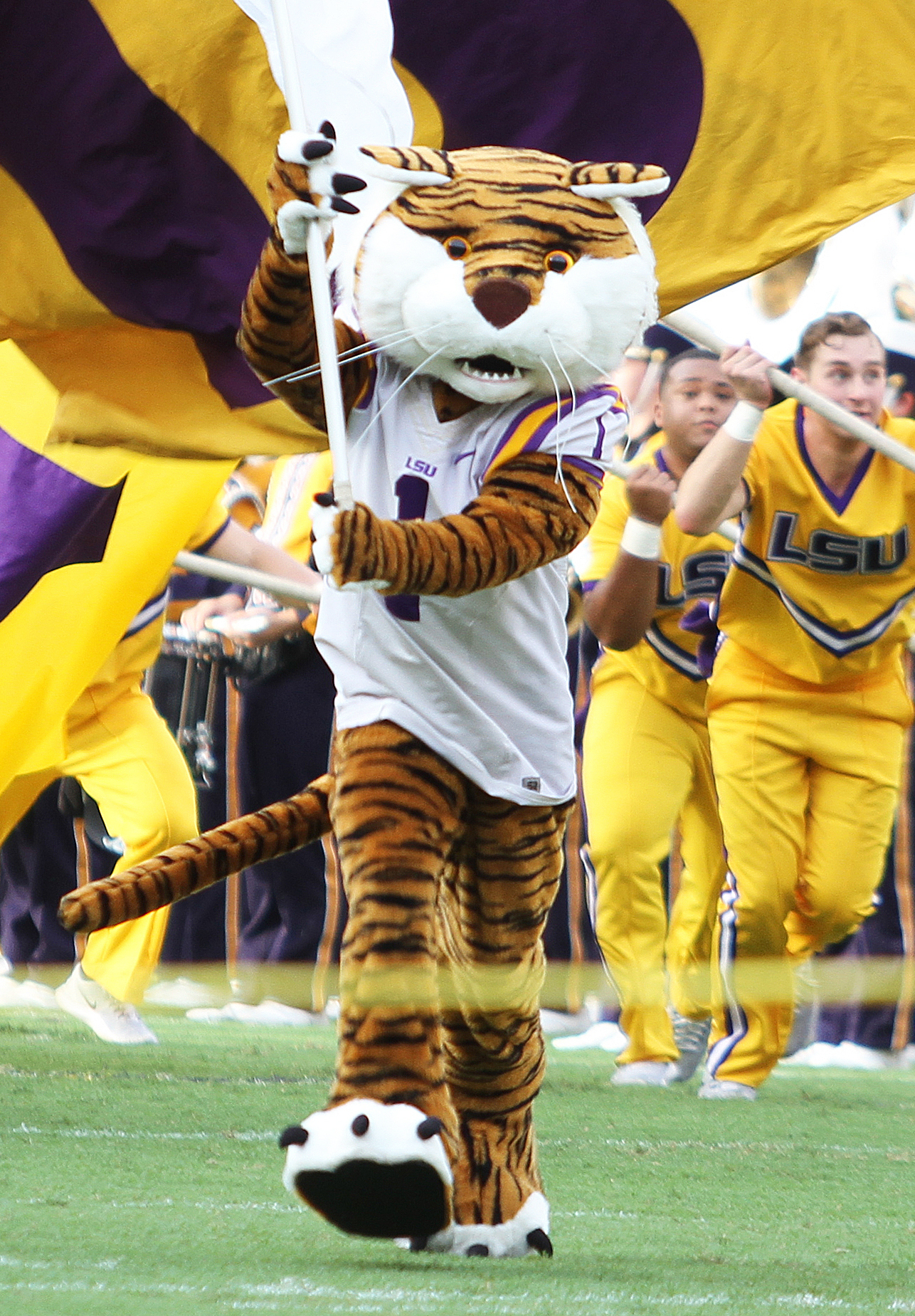
Mike the Tiger Mascot

LSU has a costumed mascot also named Mike. Mike the Tiger Mascot appears at LSU sporting events (as the live Mike the Tiger does not leave his habitat as of 2016, and previously did not attend away games for some time) and also appears at several LSU-related functions. In August 2007, Mike the Tiger Mascot was featured on a This Is SportsCenter commercial with LSU alum Shaquille O'Neal. In 2005, Team Mike was formed by a group of students and has carried on its tradition at LSU. This team of students help Mike get to his games and events on time, help him with his costumes, and bring him to Walt Disney World every January to compete in a mascot competition.. Along with other college mascots, Mike was featured in the Brad Paisley video "Country Nation" in 2015.

== See also ==
- LSU Tigers and Lady Tigers
