= Donna Britt (news anchor) =

American journalist (1958–2021)

Donna Britt (July 10, 1958 – January 21, 2021) was a longtime television news anchor at WAFB in Baton Rouge. She co-anchored the station's top rated 6 PM and 10 PM news broadcasts.

As a student, she had been working for WYNK radio, and so in 1981 she decided to get a temporary job with WAFB, the local CBS affiliate. She quickly moved from weekend reporter to full-time reporter to host of morning news shows to prime time, where she anchored 9 News.

Britt was diagnosed with amyotrophic lateral sclerosis in 2017, and retired the following year. She died at her home on January 21, 2021, at age 62.
