= Buckskin Bill Black =

American television show host

Member of the East Baton Rouge Parish School Board (District 12)
- In office 1994–2010
- Preceded by: Robert Crawford
- Succeeded by: Seat eliminated

Personal details
- Born: William Philippi Black; September 8, 1929; Haileyville, Oklahoma, U.S.
- Died: January 10, 2018 (aged 88); Baton Rouge, Louisiana, U.S.
- Occupation: Children's television host
- Years active: 1955–1990
- Known for: Storytime
- Television: WAFB
- Spouse: Elma Kever (m. 1952; died 2017)
- Children: 3

William P. "Buckskin Bill" Black (September 8, 1929 – January 10, 2018) was a Louisiana children's television personality and, later, school board member. He hosted what at the time were the longest-running children's television programs in the United States, Storyland and The Buckskin Bill Show, on Baton Rouge's WAFB-TV. Black famously helped raise funds to get the Baton Rouge Zoo built after promoting the cause on his show in the late 1950s and through the 1960s. After his successful television career, he was elected to the East Baton Rouge Parish School Board in 1994 and served for 16 years.

== Early life ==
Black was born in Haileyville, Oklahoma, to Harvey and Amelia Black, and grew up in Hugo. He attended college at Oklahoma A&M before earning a degree in speech with a minor in history from Arkansas College. During college he worked as a rodeo clown and after graduation he worked briefly in radio before being drafted into the U.S. Army during the Korean War. He served as a comic and emcee for Third Army Soldier Shows for 18 months, travelling more than 500,000 miles (800,000 km) entertaining service members.

== Television career ==
After his two years in the Army, Black began working in television as a camera man and floor manager, as well as in sales and as a writer. In 1955, while he was working at a TV station in Tulsa, Oklahoma, a former coworker contacted him with an on-air opportunity at WAFB in Baton Rouge. The afternoon program The Buckskin Bill Show launched on August 15, 1955, and was followed soon thereafter by the early morning program Storyland. The afternoon program continued until around 1980 and Storyland aired until September 1988. At that time, with the station under new management, the weekly show was changed to the hour-long Buckskin Bill and Friends, which aired on Saturday mornings until it was cancelled in 1990.

On-air, Black presented himself as an easy-going, caring frontier scout who told historical stories. Originally, he wanted to do a magic show, but the sponsor, Tasty Bakeries, wanted a Western character. Over the years, Black transitioned from playing a character to simply hosting the show as himself, albeit while still wearing Western-style clothing. One of Black's fringed shirts is on display at the Louisiana State University Textile & Costume Museum.

While educational activities were part of the programming, Black aimed to ensure the shows were entertaining too. He worked with advisers from Louisiana State University and the Louisiana State Department of Education to create a pre-school curriculum for television news that was worked into Storyland. He also included a Louisiana School for the Deaf teacher on Storyland, who provided a mix of visual aids and fingerspelling to help Deaf children enjoy the program.

Until the Baton Rouge Zoo opened on Easter 1970, Black ended each program by saying "Remember, Baton Rouge needs a zoo." As part of his advocacy for a local zoo, Black organized an "Elephant March," collecting more than 650,000 pennies to help purchase the zoo's first two elephants. He also conducted drives to raise funds and medicine for Catholic missionaries in Brazil.

In addition to his children's shows, Black produced and hosted Good Morning, Angola Style, a weekly early-morning program that gave Angola Prison inmates an opportunity to showcase their musical talent. The show, which Black viewed as a rehabilitation program, aired from 1968 to 1970. Black developed idea for the program after meeting one of the prison's country music bands, The Westernaires, after he performed at the 1967 Angola Prison Rodeo.

Beyond his television work, Black taught classes at the Louisiana State University for six years, starting in the Department of Speech and then continuing after the department merged into the school's journalism school in 1981.

=== Awards ===
Black received the Golden Deeds Award in 1975 from the Inter-Civic Council of Baton Rouge in honor of his philanthropic work. In 1990, he was honored with the 1990 "Friend of Education" award by the Louisiana Association of Educators. The year prior, Black was awarded the Public Relations Association of Louisiana's "Communicator of the Year Award".

== School board ==
In October 1994, Black ran successfully for the District 12 seat on the East Baton Rouge Parish School Board, representing the Broodmoor area. Black was recruited to run for the seat by Community Action for Public Education, a slate organized by Baton Rouge business leaders with the goal of reforming the parish's schools.

At the time, Black had been contemplating relaunching Storytime on cable television, but he was also substitute teaching in East Baton Rouge Parish schools where his granddaughter was a first grader. After Black joined the CAPE slate, the District 12 incumbent dropped out of the race. Black's remaining opponent described running against the long-time local children's television host to running against Santa Claus. Running as a Democrat, Black earned 82% of the vote.

Black was reelected three times, serving until 2010. During his time on the board, East Baton Rouge Parish negotiated an end to the parish's long-running desegregation case and gained voter approval for a 1-cent sales tax to increase teacher salaries and support new school construction.

Black declined to run for a fifth term in 2010. At the same time, as part of redistricting, the school board was reduced from 12 to 11 districts.

== Personal life ==
In April 1952, Black married his college sweetheart, Elma Kever (d. 2017). The couple had two daughters and a son.
