= Channel 32 low-power TV stations in the United States =

The following low-power television stations broadcast on digital or analog channel 32 in the United States:

- K32AB-D in Yuma, Colorado
- K32AG-D in Parowan/Enoch, etc., Utah
- K32CA-D in Battle Mountain, Nevada
- K32CC-D in Montgomery Ranch, etc., Oregon
- K32CJ-D in Ely, Nevada
- K32CQ-D in Shurz, Nevada
- K32CW-D in Montrose, Colorado
- K32DC-D in Kanab, Utah
- K32DE-D in Pendleton, Oregon
- K32DK-D in Watertown, South Dakota
- K32DW-D in Chloride, Arizona
- K32DY-D in Medford, Oregon
- K32EB-D in Alexandria, Minnesota
- K32EH-D in Memphis, Texas
- K32EM-D in Morongo Valley, California
- K32EX-D in Peetz, Colorado
- K32EY-D in Dove Creek, etc., Colorado
- K32FI-D in Yoncalla, Oregon
- K32FW-D in Pierre, South Dakota
- K32FY-D in Park Rapids, Minnesota
- K32GB-D in Agana, Guam
- K32GD-D in Guymon, Oklahoma
- K32GK-D in Elko, Nevada
- K32GW-D in Carson City, Nevada
- K32GX-D in St. James, Minnesota
- K32HA-D in Bonners, Idaho
- K32HF-D in Florence, Oregon
- K32HH-D in Kalispell, Montana
- K32HK-D in Morgan, etc., Utah
- K32HL-D in Rulison, Colorado
- K32HP-D in Hanna, etc., Utah
- K32HQ-D in Boulder, Utah
- K32HV-D in Vernal, etc., Utah
- K32HX-D in Duchesne, Utah
- K32IA-D in Manila, etc., Utah
- K32IC-D in Altus, Oklahoma
- K32IF-D in North Fork, etc., Wyoming
- K32IG-D in Ellensburg, etc., Washington
- K32IJ-D in Cortez, Colorado
- K32IK-D in San Luis Valley, Colorado
- K32IS-D in Henefer, etc., Utah
- K32IT-D in Coalville and adjacent area, Utah
- K32IU-D in Wanship, Utah
- K32IX-D in Lihue, Hawaii
- K32IZ-D in Scofield, Utah
- K32JB-D in Fountain Green, Utah
- K32JI-D in Emery, Utah
- K32JL-D in Powers, Oregon
- K32JN-D in Big Piney, etc., Wyoming
- K32JQ-D in Manhattan, Kansas
- K32JT-D in Farmington, New Mexico
- K32JU-D in Tampico, etc., Montana
- K32JW-D in Fillmore, etc., Utah
- K32JZ-D in Kabetogama, Minnesota
- K32KC-D in Montpelier, Idaho
- K32KO-D in Garden Valley, Idaho
- K32KP-D in Black Butte Ranch, Oregon
- K32KQ-D in Orovada, Nevada
- K32KT-D in Wichita Falls, Texas
- K32KY-D in Pasco, Washington
- K32LO-D in Prescott, Arizona
- K32LQ-D in Yreka, California
- K32LS-D in Driggs, Idaho
- K32LT-D in San Luis Obispo, California
- K32LW-D in Cottage Grove, Oregon
- K32LX-D in Soda Springs, Idaho
- K32LY-D in La Grande, Oregon
- K32LZ-D in Alton, Utah
- K32MC-D in Baker Flats Area, Washington
- K32MD-D in Cheyenne Wells, Colorado
- K32ME-D in Camp Verde, etc., Arizona
- K32MF-D in Red Lake, Minnesota
- K32MG-D in Enid, Oklahoma
- K32MH-D in Washington, etc., Utah
- K32MI-D in Delta/Oak City, etc, Utah
- K32MJ-D in Litchfield, California
- K32MK-D in Park City, Utah
- K32ML-D in Rural Garfield County, Utah
- K32MN-D in Howard, Montana
- K32MO-D in Capitol Reef National Park, Utah
- K32MP-D in Caineville, Utah
- K32MQ-D in Fremont, Utah
- K32MR-D in Escalante, Utah
- K32MS-D in Livingston, Montana
- K32MT-D in Tropic, etc., Utah
- K32MU-D in Hanksville, Utah
- K32MV-D in Antimony, Utah
- K32MW-D in Logan, Utah
- K32MX-D in Randolph & Woodruff, Utah
- K32MY-D in Heber/Midway, Utah
- K32MZ-D in Samak, Utah
- K32NA-D in Ridgecrest, California
- K32NB-D in Beaver etc., Utah
- K32NC-D in Toquerville, Utah
- K32ND-D in Modena, etc., Utah
- K32NE-D in Garrison, etc., Utah
- K32NF-D in Spring Glen, Utah
- K32NG-D in Green River, Utah
- K32NH-D in Ferron, Utah
- K32NI-D in Clear Creek, Utah
- K32NK-D in Lincoln City, etc., Oregon
- K32NL-D in Deming, New Mexico
- K32NM-D in Des Moines, Iowa
- K32NN-D in Joplin, Montana
- K32NO-D in Glenwood Springs, Colorado
- K32NQ-D in Salmon, Idaho
- K32NR-D in Winnemucca, Nevada
- K32NT-D in Crested Butte, Colorado
- K32NU-D in Haxtun, Colorado
- K32NV-D in Malad City, Iowa
- K32NW-D in Mina/Luning, Nevada
- K32OA-D in Coolin, Idaho
- K32OB-D in Panaca, Nevada
- K32OC-D in Corpus Christi, Texas
- K32OE-D in Alamogordo, New Mexico
- K32OF-D in Elk City, Oklahoma
- K32OG-D in Pueblo, Colorado
- K32OI-D in Eureka, California
- K32OK-D in Woody Creek, Colorado
- K32OL-D in Redstone, Colorado
- K32OV-D in Lubbock, Texas
- K32OX-D in Lucerne Valley, California
- KABI-LD in Snyder, Texas
- KAJS-LD in Lincoln, Nebraska
- KBLT-LD in Anchorage, Alaska
- KDDC-LD in Dodge City, Kansas
- KDYS-LD in Spokane, Washington
- KEJR-LD in Phoenix, Arizona
- KFAW-LD in Midland, Texas
- KFKK-LD in Stockton, California
- KFKZ-LD in Cedar Falls, Iowa
- KGCH-LD in Lake Charles, Louisiana
- KJOI-LD in Bakersfield, California
- KLNM-LD in Lufkin, Texas
- KMTI-LD in Manti and Ephraim, Utah
- KMYN-LD in Duluth, Minnesota
- KNET-CD in Los Angeles, California, uses KNLA-CD's spectrum
- KNLA-CD in Los Angeles, California
- KPTO-LD in Pocatello, Idaho
- KQKC-LD in Topeka, Kansas
- KRMS-LD in Lake Ozark, Missouri
- KRMV-LD in Riverside, California
- KRUM-LD in Seattle, Washington
- KSBT-LD in Santa Barbara, California
- KSTV-LD in Sacramento, California
- KTFV-CD in McAllen, Texas
- KUMO-LD in St Louis, Missouri
- KUPT-LD in Albuquerque, New Mexico
- KYPK-LD in Yakima, Washington
- W32CV-D in Ironwood, Michigan
- W32DH-D in Erie, Pennsylvania
- W32EG-D in Williams, Minnesota
- W32EI-D in Port Jervis, New York, to move to channel 33
- W32EO-D in Tryon, etc., North Carolina
- W32EQ-D in Tuscaloosa, Alabama
- W32EV-D in Adamsville, Tennessee
- W32EW-D in Roanoke, Virginia
- W32FB-D in Ceiba, Puerto Rico
- W32FD-D in Louisa, Kentucky
- W32FE-D in Hartwell & Royston, Georgia
- W32FH-D in St. Petersburg, Florida
- W32FI-D in Brevard, North Carolina
- W32FJ-D in Montgomery, Alabama
- W32FK-D in Valdosta, Georgia
- W32FN-D in Macon, Georgia
- W32FS-D in Bangor, Maine
- W32FW-D in Adams, Massachusetts
- W32FY-D in Clarksburg, West Virginia
- WAAO-LD in Andalusia, Alabama
- WACX-LD in Alachua, etc., Florida
- WANF-LD in Dyersburg, Tennessee
- WANN-CD in Atlanta, Georgia
- WBMA-LD in Birmingham, Alabama
- WBTS-CD in Nashua, New Hampshire, uses WGBX-TV's full-power spectrum
- WBXH-CD in Baton Rouge, Louisiana
- WCTA-LD in Columbus, Georgia
- WDRN-LD in Fayetteville, North Carolina
- WHDN-CD in Naples, Florida
- WKHU-CD in Kittanning, Pennsylvania
- WLPD-CD in Plano, Illinois
- WMBQ-CD in New York, New York
- WMVH-CD in Charleroi, Pennsylvania
- WNDR-LD in Auburn, New York
- WQDT-LD in New Orleans, Louisiana
- WQEO-LD in Memphis, Tennessee
- WRNT-LD in Hartford, Connecticut
- WRZB-LD in Washington, D.C.
- WSJU-LD in Ceiba, Puerto Rico
- WSRG-LD in Scranton, Pennsylvania
- WTHV-LD in Huntsville, Alabama
- WTKO-CD in Oneida, New York
- WUCB-LD in Cobleskill, New York
- WYFX-LD in Youngstown, Ohio
- WZPA-LD in Philadelphia, Pennsylvania

The following low-power stations, which are no longer licensed, formerly broadcast on digital or analog channel 32:

- K32DR-D in Granite Falls, Minnesota
- K32DS in Evanston, Wyoming
- K32EL-D in Shoshoni, Wyoming
- K32FE in Tucumcari, New Mexico
- K32FN in Wenatchee, Washington
- K32FR in Orangeville, Utah
- K32HB in Manhattan, Kansas
- K32HD in Huntsville, Utah
- K32HO-D in Fruitland, Utah
- K32JE-D in Quincy, Washington
- K32JG-D in Rapid City, South Dakota
- K32JJ-D in Rolla, Missouri
- K32JK-D in Boise, Idaho
- K32JM-D in Twin Falls, Idaho
- K32NP-D in Billings, Montana
- KCLG-LD in Neosho, Missouri
- KDMD-LP in Fairbanks, Alaska
- KKAM-LP in Kailua-Kona, Hawaii
- KMBU-LP in Enterprise, Utah
- KYWF-LD in Wichita Falls, Texas
- W32DU-D in La Grange, Georgia
- WBAX-LD in Albany, New York
- WBWM-LP in Mount Pleasant, Michigan
- WDYH-LD in Augusta, Georgia
- WEEE-LP in Knoxville, Tennessee
- WMNE-LP in Portland, Maine
- WWRD-LP in Dayton, Ohio
