= WAFB =

Television station in Baton Rouge, Louisiana

- Baton Rouge, Louisiana; United States
- Channels: Digital: 9 (VHF); Virtual: 9
- Branding: WAFB Channel 9; 9 News; WBXH (9.4)

Programming
- Affiliations: 9.1: CBS; for others, see § Subchannels

Ownership
- Owner: Gray Media; (Gray Television Licensee, LLC)
- Sister stations: WBXH-CD

History
- First air date: April 19, 1953
- Former call signs: WAFB-TV (1953–1988)
- Former channel numbers: Analog: 28 (UHF, 1953–1960), 9 (VHF, 1960–2009); Digital: 46 (UHF, until 2009)
- Former affiliations: All secondary: NBC (1953–1955); DuMont (1953–1955); ABC (1953–1971)
- Call sign meaning: We're Always For Baton Rouge (derived from former radio sister stations WAFB and WAFB-FM)

Technical information
- Licensing authority: FCC
- Facility ID: 589
- ERP: 5.57 kW
- HAAT: 511 m (1,677 ft)
- Transmitter coordinates: 30°21′59″N 91°12′47″W

Links
- Public license information: Public file; LMS
- Website: wafb.com

WAFB (channel 9) is a television station in Baton Rouge, Louisiana, United States, affiliated with CBS. It is owned by Gray Media alongside WBXH-CD (channel 39), an independent station with MyNetworkTV. The two stations share studios on Government Street in downtown Baton Rouge; WAFB's transmitter is located on River Road near the city's Riverbend section.

== History ==
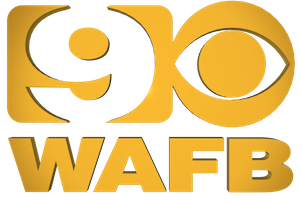
WAFB logo used from 2004-2024, versions of the "boxed 9" logo were used from 1985-2024.

The station began broadcasting on April 19, 1953, as the first television station in Baton Rouge, and the second television station in the state of Louisiana. It launched as a television counterpart to local radio stations WAFB and WAFB-FM, which both signed on in 1948 and were affiliated with the Mutual Broadcasting System. Louis S. Prejean and associates (Modern Broadcasting of Baton Rouge) were the first owners of the station, and they sold it to Royal Street Corporation of New Orleans in 1956, which owned WDSU-TV, the first television station in Louisiana. In 1957, they sold the radio stations, with the AM station changing its format to black music and the FM station going off the air; a new WAFB-FM would sign on in 1968. Royal Street owned the station until 1964, when it sold the station to locally based Guaranty Corporation. In 1965, the station moved its transmission tower from Zachary to south of LSU's campus, allowing viewers in a 90-mile (140 km) radius to receive its signal; it was also in that year that the station started broadcasting in color.

Originally broadcasting an analog signal on UHF channel 28, WAFB moved to VHF channel 9 in 1960. WDAM-TV in Hattiesburg, Mississippi, moved to channel 7 to accommodate this switch. The station has always been a CBS affiliate but carried some NBC programming until WBRZ-TV signed on in 1955. WAFB also carried some ABC programming with WBRZ until WRBT (now WVLA) signed on in 1971 and some programming from DuMont until that network folded. The station also aired Time for Beany during its early years on the air from the Paramount Television Network and was briefly affiliated with the NTA Film Network, airing programs Sheriff of Cochise, How to Marry a Millionaire, and This is Alice.

In 1988, Guaranty sold the station to AFLAC. Coincidentally, the call letters of the station, WAFB, also spelled out their new owner: American Family Broadcasting (although the WAFB calls predate this ownership by 40 years when its former original sister radio station signed on in 1948 with the slogan "Always For Baton Rouge"). Under new ownership, the station underwent many changes. During 1988, AFLAC invested $2 million in redesigning the studio, dropped the -TV suffix from its call letters and began branding itself as "Louisiana's News Channel", a slogan the station still uses today. In addition, the new owners cancelled the station's beloved 33-year-old half-hour local weekday program Storyland, then the longest-running children's program, hosted by Buckskin Bill Black, and rechristened it as Buckskin and Friends, an hour-long show that aired on Saturday mornings until it was cancelled in September 1990. It was also in 1988 that the owners petitioned CBS to air the network's daytime programs in a different order—airing syndicated programming at 10 a.m., The Price Is Right at 11 a.m., and The Young and the Restless at 3 p.m. (later 4 p.m.) as a way to boost ratings as a lead-in to the noon and 5 p.m. newscasts. WAFB began broadcasting 24 hours a day on September 12, 1990.

In 1997, AFLAC sold its entire broadcasting division, including WAFB, to Raycom Media. In 2003, Raycom acquired former The Box affiliate WBXH-CA, which became a sister station to WAFB when the channel became Baton Rouge's third UPN affiliate and later MyNetworkTV affiliate in 2006. It originally aired a digital signal on UHF channel 46 from a transmitter at its studios.

On June 25, 2018, Atlanta-based Gray Television announced it had reached an agreement with Raycom to merge their respective broadcasting assets (consisting of Raycom's 63 existing owned-and/or-operated television stations, including WAFB, and Gray's 93 television stations) under Gray's corporate umbrella. The cash-and-stock merger transaction valued at $3.6 billion – in which Gray shareholders would acquire preferred stock currently held by Raycom – resulted in WAFB gaining new sister stations in nearby markets, including CBS/ABC affiliate KNOE-TV in Monroe and NBC/CBS affiliate KALB-TV in Alexandria, in addition to its current Raycom sister stations. The combined company thereby gained a presence in every Louisiana market except for Lafayette as a result. The sale was approved on December 20, and was completed on January 2, 2019.

== Programming ==
WAFB was one of a handful of stations that shifts the air times of various CBS programming. From 1988 until 2019, The Price Is Right aired at 11 a.m. instead of 10 a.m., and The Young and the Restless aired at 4 p.m. instead of 11 a.m. The station made this change to give its noon and 5 p.m. newscasts a strong lead-in. However, on September 9, 2019, WAFB resumed airing both programs at their respective network-recommended times of 10 a.m. and 11 a.m. The station aired Jeopardy! and Wheel of Fortune until 1995 when the shows moved to WBRZ. Live with Regis and Kelly and The Oprah Winfrey Show were seen until the late 1990s. Oprah moved to WBRZ but since then aired on WVLA until the show ended its run in 2011. Regis and Kelly (now Live with Kelly and Mark) continues to air on WBRZ. The People's Court also once aired on WAFB before going to WBRZ and later WGMB. The station aired the syndicated version of Family Feud hosted by Steve Harvey until 2020 and aired the versions hosted by Louie Anderson, Richard Karn, and John O'Hurley, with the exception of Karn's first season, which aired on KZUP-CD, and Harvey's second through fifth seasons, which aired on WVLA. Until 2015, WAFB aired the syndicated version of Who Wants to Be a Millionaire; the show aired on sister station WBXH until its cancellation in 2019. WAFB also airs the Sunday services from the First United Methodist Church in the city.

One locally produced show that brought years of enjoyment to children was hosted by "Buckskin Bill" Black (William Black) that ran in different formats from 1955 until 1990. There were several characters that were regulars on the show including "Señor Puppet" (a marionette voiced by Sid Crocker) and "Whatsyourname" (another puppet voiced by Mary Hillen). The show had a way of educating young children while making it fun to learn. Two games many adults can remember Buckskin playing were called "Hully Gully" which helped to teach counting numbers and the "Monday Morning March". The two shows he hosted were called Storyland (for younger children during morning broadcasting) and The Buckskin Bill Show (for older children during the afternoons, which ended September 1977). Buckskin was also one of the first shows in the United States to have a sign-language interpreter for hearing-impaired viewers prior to closed-captioning. Through two gracious campaigns from his show, Buckskin Bill helped to start the Baton Rouge Zoo. During this campaign, he asked children to bring in their pennies to buy an elephant. The penny campaign was successful enough to purchase two. Upon being taken over by AFLAC, station management canceled the daily Storyland on September 30, 1988, and converted it to a Saturday morning hour-long program called Buckskin Bill and Friends that began airing on November 5, 1988. Said program ended in late 1990 after Black resigned from WAFB. Bill Black later became involved with the East Baton Rouge Parish Public Schools Board and other civic organizations until his death on January 10, 2018.

On December 30, 2023, WAFB parent company Gray Television announced it had reached an agreement with the New Orleans Pelicans to air 10 games on the station during the 2023–24 season.

On September 17, 2024, Gray and the Pelicans announced a broader deal to form the Gulf Coast Sports & Entertainment Network, which will broadcast nearly all 2024–25 Pelicans games on Gray's stations in the Gulf South, including WAFB.

=== News operation ===
WAFB's newscasts have had the second-highest ratings at 10 p.m. in any of the country's biggest television markets according to The Des Moines Register in Iowa. Nielsen Media Research ratings showed that 16.2% of all households in the Baton Rouge area watched the show. The only station to get a bigger share of the local audience was KCCI, the CBS affiliate in Des Moines, which was watched by 17.9% of area households.

For most of its history, WAFB was a distant second to WBRZ in the ratings given WBRZ's consistent history on the VHF band and former roots in the Baton Rouge Advocate. In the mid-1990s, WBRZ experienced significant staff turnover and several news format changes while AFLAC and Raycom invested heavily in improving WAFB's news product by maintaining low turnover in its news staff and presentation (WAFB used the "Newschannel" theme by Gari Media from 1990 until Raycom switched its news music client to Stephen Arnold Music in late 2014), leading WAFB to overtake WBRZ's news ratings in 1994. In the recent ratings period, it beat the others stations' combined weeknights at 5, 6, and 10. In total, the station's news department produces 25 hours of news programming each week. This includes two newscasts on sister station WBXH-CD (weeknights at 9, which began on January 8, 2007, and Saturday mornings). WAFB's weekday morning news is repeated on that station. WAFB also has a Cox cable channel devoted to airing simulcasts and rebroadcasts of its news broadcasts.

On March 3, 2008, WAFB became the first in Baton Rouge and the third in Louisiana to broadcast its local broadcasts in high definition. The WBXH broadcasts were included in the upgrade. On September 12, 2011, WAFB became the first station in the market (and, to date, the only station) to begin its morning newscasts at 4:30 a.m. instead of 5 a.m. On March 26, 2020, WAFB became the second station in the Baton Rouge market to launch a 4 p.m. newscast in the midst of the COVID-19 pandemic, and on August 3, 2020, WAFB became the first station in Baton Rouge to expand its 6 p.m. newscast to a full hour. On June 26, 2023, WAFB launched a 9 a.m. weekday newscast.

Despite becoming rarer among other television news operations, WAFB occasionally broadcast an editorial that was usually delivered by the station manager. This practice ended shortly after Gray assumed ownership of the station.

==== Notable former on-air staff ====
- Donna Britt – anchor (deceased)
- Tim Brando – sports (now broadcasts for various sports outlets including Fox Sports)
- Isiah Carey (now at KRIV in Houston)
- Jay Young – former 6 and 10 p.m. news anchor in the late 1970s, later served as one of the first anchors of CNN and at WBRZ

== Technical information ==
=== Subchannels ===
The station's signal is multiplexed:

Subchannels of WAFB
Channel	Res.	Short name	Programming
9.1	1080i	WAFB HD	CBS
9.2	480i	Bounce	Bounce TV
9.3	480i	GCSEN	Gulf Coast Sports & Entertainment Network
9.4	480i	WBXH DT	WBXH-CD (Independent with MyNetworkTV)
9.5	480i	DABL	Dabl
9.6	480i	IONPlus	Ion Plus
9.7	480i	Oxygen	Oxygen

Simulcast of subchannels of another station

Beginning in October 2024, WAFB's third subchannel has been affiliated with the Gray Television owned Gulf Coast Sports & Entertainment Network. The network is the television home of the New Orleans Pelicans of the National Basketball Association.

=== Analog-to-digital conversion ===
WAFB shut down its analog signal, over VHF channel 9, on June 12, 2009, the official date on which full-power television stations in the United States transitioned from analog to digital broadcasts under federal mandate. The station's digital signal relocated from its pre-transition UHF channel 46 to VHF channel 9. With the new digital channel, WAFB rebroadcasts WBXH on channel 9.4 and, before the launch of Bounce TV affiliate September 2011, weather on channel 9.2.
