= Mike the Tiger Habitat =

Animal enclosure in Baton Rouge, Louisiana, U.S.

Coordinates: 30.41344°N 91.18504°W

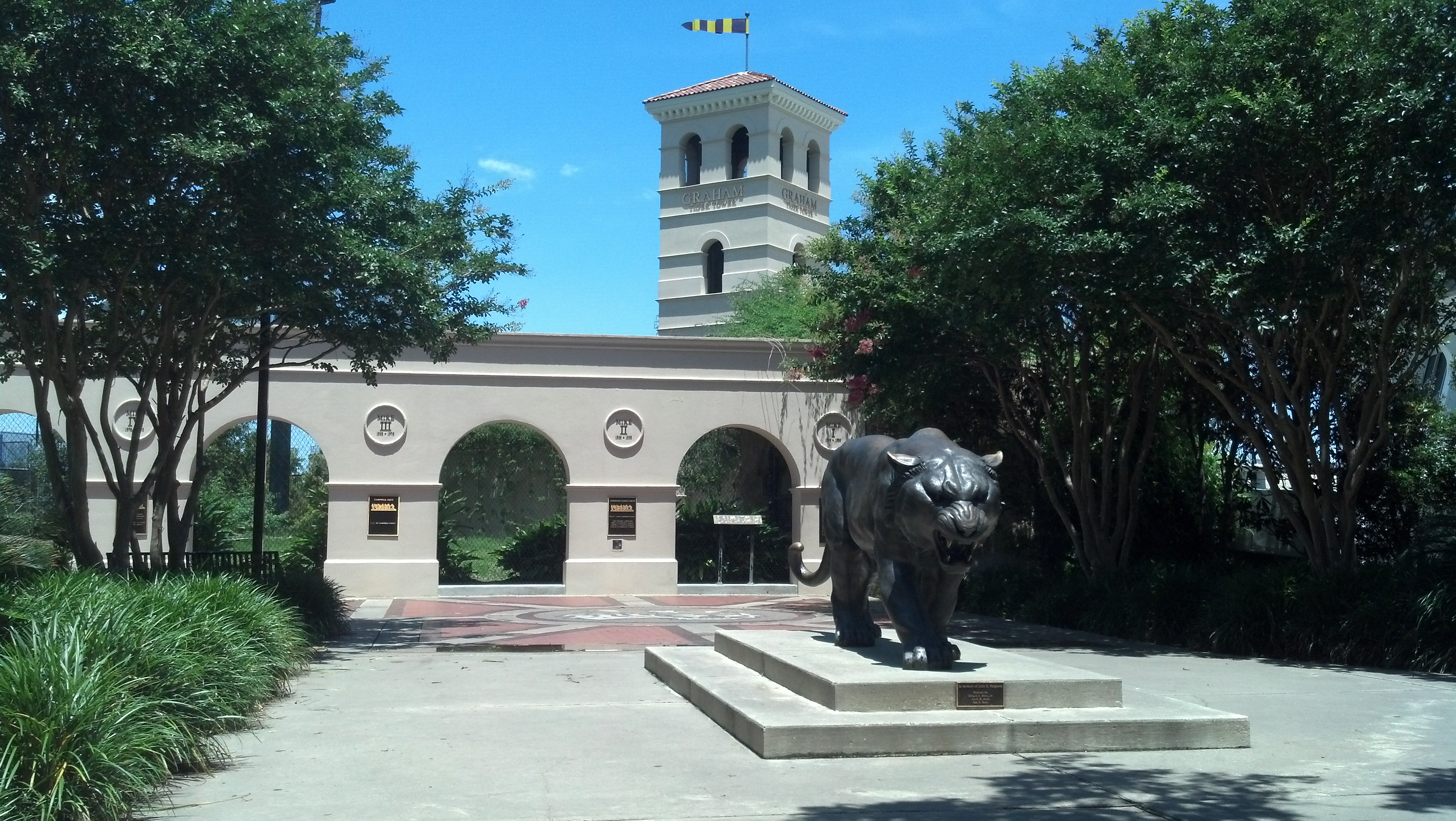
- Tiger habitat of Mike the Tiger at LSU
- University: Louisiana State University
- Description: Royal Bengal tiger habitat

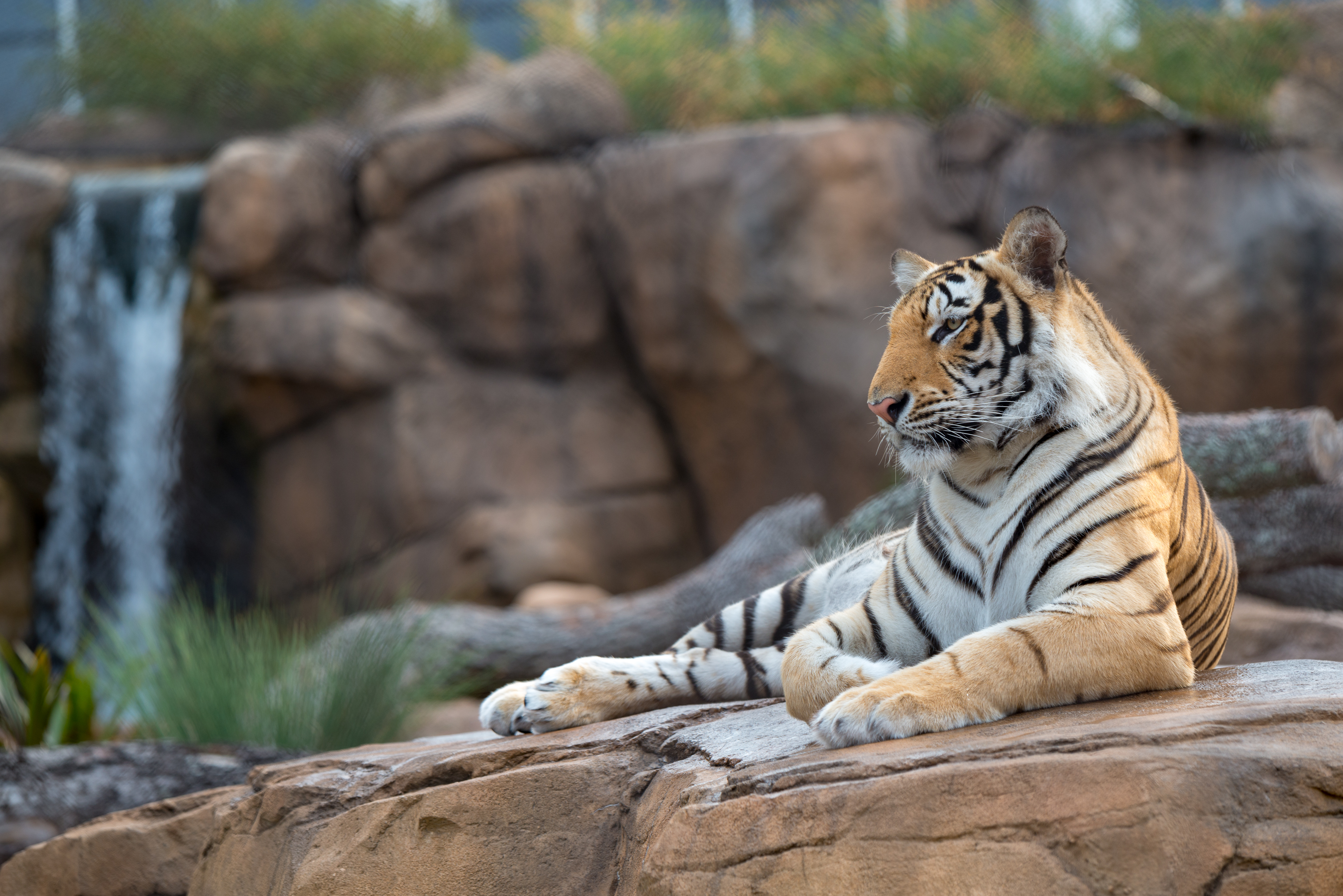
Mike the Tiger in tiger habitat

Mike the Tiger is the official live and costumed mascot of Louisiana State University in Baton Rouge, Louisiana. LSU's men's and women's sports teams are called the Tigers. The tiger mascot has had an on-campus building since 1936.

== Original enclosure ==
LSU has had a live tiger mascot on campus since Mike I arrived on campus on October 21, 1936. The original enclosure was only 2,000 square feet in size and offered minimal amenities for the tigers. It had a building and a covered, caged enclosure with logs where Mike could climb and roam.

== I Like Mike campaign ==
In fall 2001, a grassroots "I Like Mike" campaign was begun to build Mike the Tiger a new and larger home. The first phase of the campaign consisted of placing Tiger trucks accepting donations around LSU's campus during home football games. In addition, collection boxes were placed at all concession stands in Tiger Stadium and at the Pete Maravich Assembly Center during basketball season. A collection box was also placed at Mike the Tiger's original enclosure.

The next phase involved people donating $100 and having a brick engraved. These bricks were then used in the construction of the walkway around Mike's new habitat. Student organizations as well as the Tiger Athletic Foundation's (TAF) Collegiate Club joined forces to actively raise funds for the campaign. The $10.00 membership for the TAF Collegiate Club went directly to the "I Like Mike" campaign. A committee headed by the wife of former LSU Chancellor, DeLaine Emmert and Bill Hulsey was formed to seek additional sponsors for the project. Louisiana artist George Rodrigue created a painting which could be purchased for $500 with donations going to the project.

== Mike the Tiger habitat ==
In 2005, a new $3 million habitat was created for Mike by Torre Design Consortium, LTD. The habitat (situated between Tiger Stadium and the Pete Maravich Assembly Center) features state-of-the-art technologies and includes among its amenities lush plantings, a waterfall, a flowing stream that empties into a wading pond, and rocky plateaus. The habitat has, as a backdrop, an Italianate tower – a campanile – that creates a visual link to the Italianate architectural vernacular of LSU's campus. The new habitat ranks among the largest and finest tiger preserves in the United States and expanded Mike's home to 15,000 square feet (1,400 m^{2}). It also features research, conservation, and husbandry programs, as well as educational, interpretive, and recreational activities. Mike attracts more than 100,000 visitors each year to the habitat and can be viewed via the live Tigercam at MiketheTiger.com.

== Gallery ==
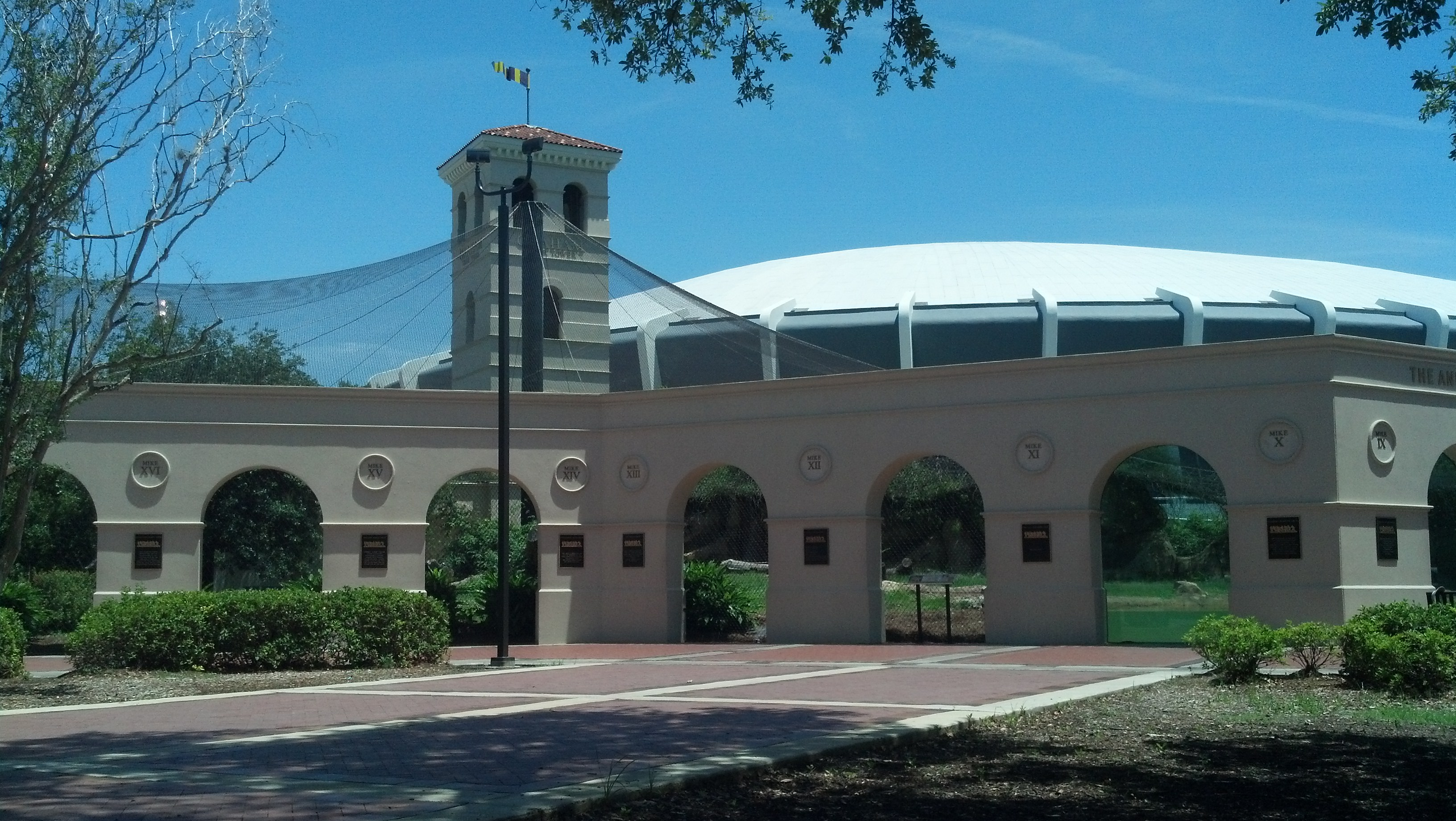
Mike the Tiger Habitat

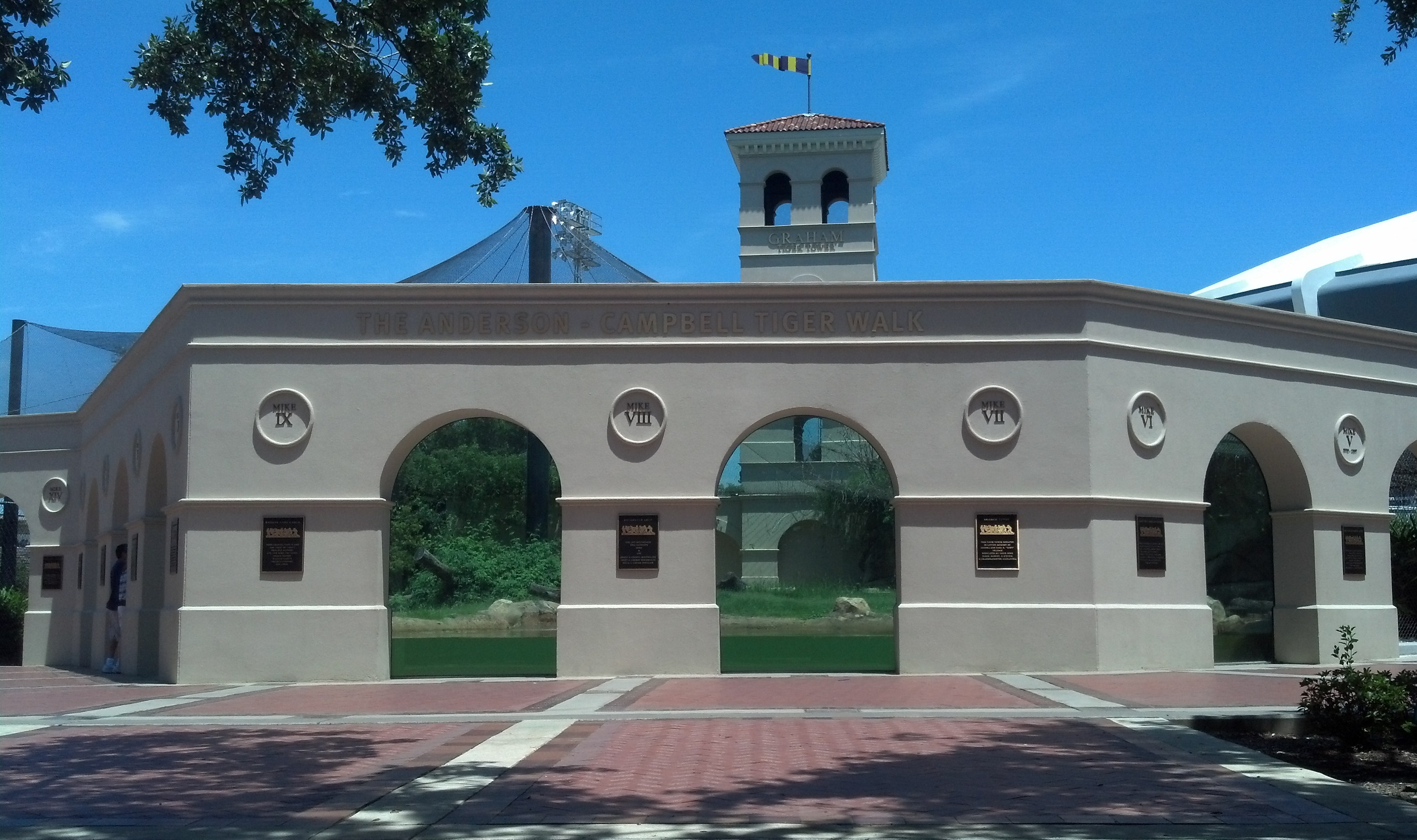
Mike the Tiger Habitat - Front view

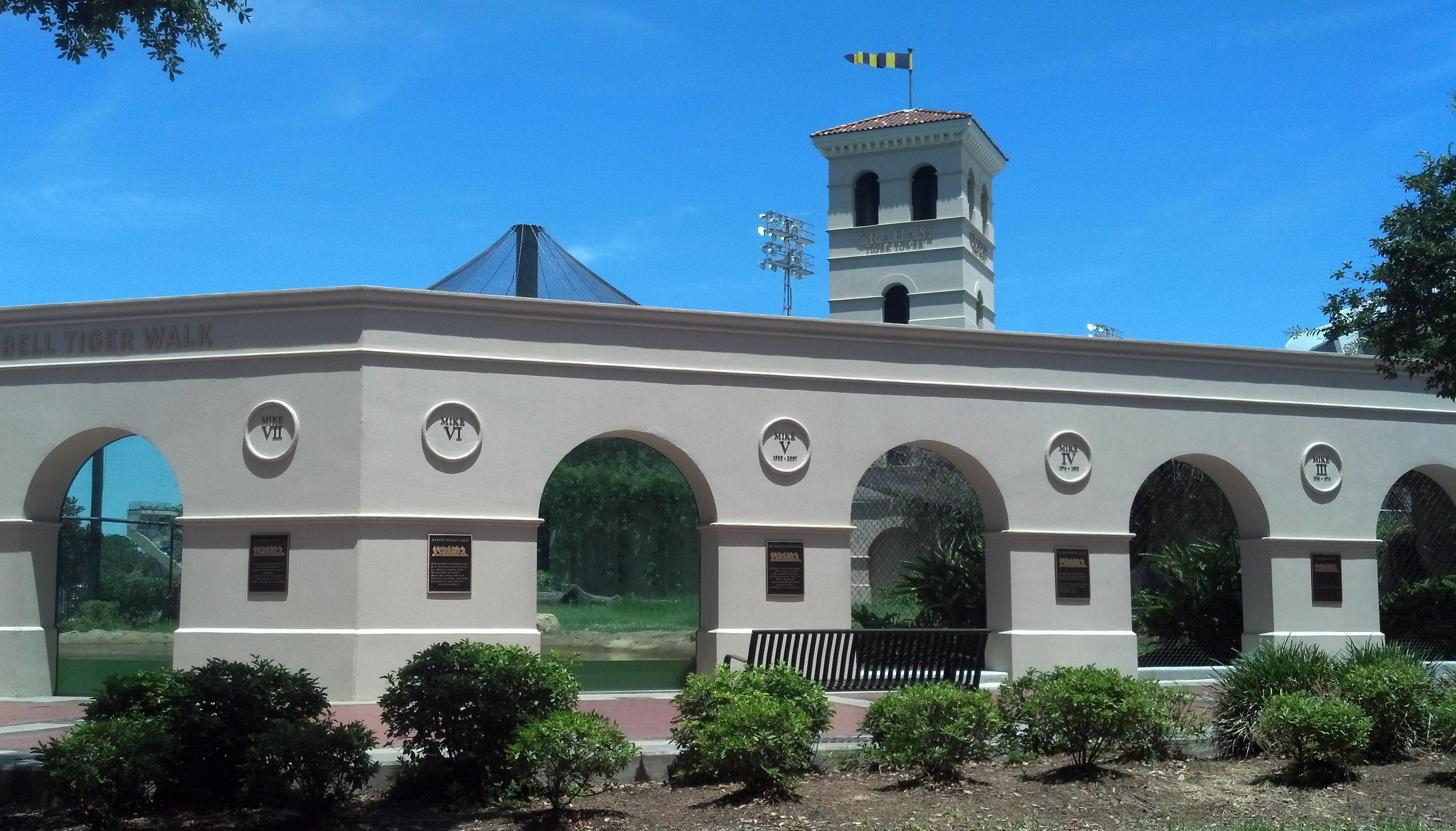
Mike the Tiger Habitat - Side view

== See also ==
- Mike the Tiger
