= WBXH-CD =

Television station in Baton Rouge, Louisiana

- Baton Rouge, Louisiana; United States
- Channels: Digital: 32 (UHF); Virtual: 39
- Branding: WBXH (general); 9 News The BIG Xtra Hour (morning newscast)

Programming
- Affiliations: 39.1: Independent with MyNetworkTV; for others, see § Subchannels

Ownership
- Owner: Gray Media; (Gray Television Licensee, LLC)
- Sister stations: WAFB

History
- Founded: August 23, 1989
- First air date: September 27, 1990
- Former channel numbers: Analog: 46 (UHF, 1990–2002); Digital: 39 (UHF, 2009–2018)
- Former affiliations: The Box (1990–2001); MTV2 (2001–2003); UPN (2003–2006)
- Call sign meaning: "The Box is Hot!" (former slogan based on affiliation)

Technical information
- Licensing authority: FCC
- Facility ID: 51806
- ERP: 9 kW
- HAAT: 134 m (440 ft)
- Transmitter coordinates: 30°26′37″N 91°10′54″W
- Translator(s): WAFB-DT 9.4 (VHF) Baton Rouge

Links
- Public license information: Public file; LMS

WBXH-CD (channel 39) is a low-power, Class A television station in Baton Rouge, Louisiana, United States. It is programmed primarily as an independent station, but maintains a secondary affiliation with MyNetworkTV. WBXH-CD is owned by Gray Media alongside CBS affiliate WAFB (channel 9). The two stations share studios on Government Street in downtown Baton Rouge, where WBXH-CD's transmitter is also located.

Even though WBXH-CD broadcasts a digital signal of its own, the low-power broadcasting radius only covers the immediate Baton Rouge area. Therefore, it is simulcast in standard definition on WAFB's fourth digital subchannel in order to reach the entire market; this can be seen on channel 9.4 from a transmitter on River Road near the city's Riverbend section.

== History ==
WBXH began broadcasting on September 27, 1990, and was owned by the Box LP Group who owned low-power affiliates of The Box music channel across the United States. In 2001, it became an affiliate of MTV2. The station operated on UHF channel 46 until WAFB signed-on its digital signal on the same channel in 2002. This led WBXH to change channels to 39. It was purchased by Raycom Media in 2003 and became a UPN affiliate. WBXH was the third and final station in Baton Rouge to be affiliated with the network, as UPN was originally programmed on WBTR from 1995 to 1999 and then on KZUP from 1999 to 2003. It showcased itself as "UPN the Block" and used a duo known as "Rider and the Fish" to promote programming and various locales around Baton Rouge. On January 24, 2006, Time Warner (which was the owner of The WB at that time) and CBS Corporation (which purchased UPN at the start of 2006) announced that the WB and UPN networks would be shutting down and that those two companies would combine their resources to create a new television service. The newly combined network would be called The CW. The letters would represent the first initial of its respective corporate parents.

On February 22, News Corporation announced that it would start up another new network called MyNetworkTV. This new service, which would be a sister network to Fox, would be operated by Fox Television Stations and its syndication division Twentieth Television. MyNetworkTV was created in order to give UPN and WB stations, not mentioned as becoming CW affiliates, another option besides becoming independent. It was also created to compete against The CW. On March 7, WBXH was announced as an affiliate of MyNetworkTV along with sister stations WUAB in Cleveland and KFVE in Honolulu. Until the September 5 launch of the new network, the UPN branding on WBXH was removed which resulted in the station becoming one of a few non-Fox owned-and-operated UPN stations to do so. In the interim, the station called itself "WBXH the Block."

WBXH's second logo as a MyNetworkTV affiliate, used from 2008 to 2012.

Since becoming a MyNetworkTV affiliate, the station branded itself as "My BR TV," and in 2010, it began identifying itself as "channel 16," as the station is viewed on Cox Cable channel 16 in the Baton Rouge area. In other idents, the station identifies itself by its digital channel: 9.4. In September 2012, the station de-emphasized its MyNetworkTV affiliation by rebranding itself as "WBXH Channel 16: Where X marks the spot" and the newscast as 9 News Extra after being called My 9 News at 9.

On December 17, 2014, the station was licensed for digital operation and changed its call sign to WBXH-CD.

On August 1, 2015, the station added Grit and Escape (now Ion Mystery) as subchannels; they are also available on Cox Cable channels 128 and 129 in the Baton Rouge market. On June 28, 2021, WBXH-CD2 assumed the MeTV affiliation from WLFT-CD, pushing Grit and Court TV Mystery each down a subchannel.

On August 31, 2018, WBXH became the first Baton Rouge-area station to change its frequency due to spectrum reallocation, moving from its previous digital channel of 39 to channel 32.

== Newscasts ==
On January 8, 2007, WAFB began producing a half-hour weeknight 9 p.m. newscast on WBXH under the title My 9 News at 9. WAFB's weekday morning newscast is also rebroadcast on this station. The station also airs a live Saturday morning newscast, which is currently the only WAFB-produced newscast airing on WBXH-CA on weekends. On March 3, 2008, WAFB became the first in Baton Rouge and the third in Louisiana to broadcast their local news in high definition; the newscasts on WBXH were included in the upgrade. The 9 p.m. newscast was later renamed 9 News X-Tra after WBXH de-emphasized its MyNetworkTV affiliation in 2012.

In November 2013, WBXH canceled its 9 p.m. newscast, replacing it with reruns of WAFB's popular program, Sportsline. The station continued airing a unique newscast called The Six30, which aired at 6:30 p.m. on weeknights. The newscast was hosted by Steve Caparotta and Greg Meriwether and was geared toward the young adult audience. In August 2014, The Six30 was canceled. On September 8, 2014, WBXH premiered a new news program: 9 News This Morning — The Big Xtra Hour, which is a continuation of WAFB's 9 News This Morning. The program airs from 7 to 8 a.m. while WAFB airs the first hour of CBS Mornings, and it features Graham Ulkins, Johnny Ahysen and Diane Deaton with more emphasis on covering weather and traffic around the Greater Baton Rouge area. WBXH does not air a prime time newscast. It also simulcasts the 6 a.m. hour of WAFB's 9 News This Morning from its main channel.

== Subchannels ==
The station's signal is multiplexed:

Subchannels of WBXH-CD
Channel	Res.	Short name	Programming
39.1	1080i	WBXH	Main WBXH-CD programming
39.2	480i	MeTV	MeTV
39.3	480i	Grit	Grit
39.4	480i	IONMyst	Ion Mystery
39.5	480i	The365	365BLK

== See also ==
- Channel 16 branded TV stations in the United States
- Channel 32 digital TV stations in the United States
- Channel 32 low-power TV stations in the United States
- Channel 39 virtual TV stations in the United States
