= WWRD-LP =

Television station in Dayton, Ohio (1989–2021)

- Dayton, Ohio; United States
- Channels: Analog: 32 (UHF); Digital: 10 (VHF) (never built)

Programming
- Affiliations: Gospel Music Channel; RTV; Heartland; The Country Network

Ownership
- Owner: Life Broadcasting Network

History
- Founded: August 22, 1989
- First air date: December 8, 1989
- Last air date: December 21, 2021
- Former call signs: W59BQ (1989–1990); W55BQ (1990–1996)
- Former channel numbers: 59 (UHF, 1989–1990); 55 (UHF 1990–2002)
- Call sign meaning: The Word of God

Technical information
- Licensing authority: FCC
- Facility ID: 17237
- Class: TX
- ERP: 33.23 kW
- HAAT: 155 m (509 ft)
- Transmitter coordinates: 39°40′47.97″N 84°4′55.97″W

Links
- Public license information: LMS

WWRD-LP (channel 32) was a low-power television station in Dayton, Ohio, United States. Founded December 8, 1989, the station was owned by Life Broadcasting Network.

== History ==
In March 1993, The Rev. Lamont Carroll, pastor of the Cathedral of Life World Outreach Center in Fairborn and president of the center's ministry, Life Broadcasting Network, announced that pending under $100,000 in fundraising toward a $200,000 goal, the ministry planned to sign on a Christian television station on channel 55 by summer. The planned 1,000-watt station would broadcast 24 hours a day from a 199-foot (61 m) tower on land leased from Centerville First Church of the Nazarene, two miles (3 km) south of Centerville in Washington Township, Montgomery County, and would have a range of 14 to 15 miles (23 to 24 km). Carroll stated that the ministry, which already owned WIDS radio in Russell Springs, Kentucky, had applied for a construction permit for the TV station two years earlier. On June 28, 1993, the township's Board of Zoning Appeals turned down the variance required to build the tower.

The station signed on February 1, 1996, with a broadcasting radius of about 25 miles (40 km), operating from the transmitter site mentioned above (sources have not yet been found explaining when and how the zoning issue had been overcome or what progress had been made on the station in the intervening years). In September 1996, the station received the WWRD call letters.

By August 1997, the station was airing Christian, family and children's shows, music videos, and news.

It was reported that Carroll and the ministry had leased WWRD to other enterprises in the years before 2004. In that year, the ministry reasserted control over the station and on June 7, 2005, WWRD returned to Christian programming and gospel music videos, operating out of a building on Clyo Road in Centerville.

By mid-September 2007, the station had affiliated with the Gospel Music Channel.

In summer 2008, WWRD-LP moved from channel 55 at 10 kW to channel 32 at 13 kW.

In January 2010, the station announced that it would be carrying entertainment, nostalgic and family-friendly TV dramas and comedies, and sports, in addition to gospel music videos. Married, longtime Dayton radio personalities Butch Brown and Karen Kelly were to begin hosting a Saturday morning talk and entertainment show, focusing on positive stories and caring members of the community. In July 2010, the station reached an agreement to carry up to 20 Dayton Gems minor league hockey games in the upcoming season. In 2010, the station began carrying Horizon League basketball games as part of the league's TV syndication package.

At some point prior to mid-June 2011, the station switched affiliation from the Gospel Music Channel to the Retro Television Network.

On April 14, 2012, the station's general manager, Randall Hulsmeyer, announced plans to move the station's operations to Springfield. Hulsmeyer stated that he hoped to add more locally produced programming to WWRD-LP, including a new, weekly Springfield-based show titled Our Town, Our Time, which began airing on April 22. In December, the station moved into a new studio in the former Credit Life building in downtown Springfield. No plans have been announced to move the station's transmitter or to change its city of license.

At some point prior to early July 2013, the station affiliated with the revival of The Nashville Network. Around the same time, the station's branding was changed to "Local TV 4 me!", despite no apparent connection to any channel 4, be it broadcast, cable or satellite. The Nashville Network became Heartland in October 2013.

At some point prior to early February 2016, the station affiliated with ZUUS Country, which became The Country Network in January 2016.

Although WWRD-LP had apparently not converted from its analog signal to the applied-for digital channel 42 as of June 2018, the station was scheduled to move to digital channel 10, as part of the Federal Communications Commission (FCC)'s spectrum reallocation process. It lost its carriage on Spectrum cable systems on November 19, 2021.

On December 21, 2021, Life Broadcasting Network surrendered WWRD-LP's license to the FCC, who canceled it the same day.

== See also ==
- Channel 32 low-power TV stations in the United States
- List of television stations in Ohio
- List of television stations in Ohio (by channel number)
- List of television stations in the United States by call sign (initial letter W)
