= Isiah Carey =

American television broadcast journalist and reporter

- Born: October 17, 1970 (age 56); Baton Rouge, Louisiana, U.S.
- Education: Southern University
- Occupation: Broadcast journalist

Isiah Carey (born October 17, 1970) is an American television broadcast journalist and reporter who has worked for television and radio stations throughout the southeast portion of the United States.

== Early life and education ==
Carey was born in Baton Rouge, Louisiana, and attended McKinley Senior High School. After graduating from high school, Carey entered the University of Louisiana at Lafayette to study mass communications. In 1989, he enrolled at Southern University in Baton Rouge and before graduation he worked as one of the city's youngest radio news anchor and reporters for WXOK radio in Baton Rouge.

== Career ==
By 1990, Carey was also news director and anchor at KQXL-FM and WYCT-FM. That same year, he got his first break in TV as a reporter and weekend public-affairs talk-show host at WVLA-TV (NBC) (Baton Rouge). In 1991, he joined WAFB (Baton Rouge), where he remained for four years as a fill in co-host of a morning news program and general assignment reporter. Carey has worked at KARK-TV, channel 4 Little Rock, Arkansas and at television stations in Memphis, Tennessee, and Washington, D.C. (BET).

Carey currently works as a reporter for KRIV, channel 26, in Houston, Texas.

=== Honors and awards ===
Throughout his broadcasting career, he has won several awards, including an Emmy for live reporting while working in Little Rock after a plane crash in 1999, and an award from the Society of Professional Journalists in Memphis for investigative reporting in 2000.

After a report on the city's homeless population, Houston Mayor, Bill White, declared June 23, 2009, "Isiah Carey Day" in Houston.

While an investigative reporter at WHBQ-TV in Memphis, Tennessee, Carey was the winner of two awards by the Society of Professional Journalists in 2000.

Carey was also honored in 2008 by the University of Houston for his efforts in getting a Houston man cleared in the shooting of a pitbull that attacked his family. That man, Wady Spikes, was charged and jailed for animal cruelty. But after Isiah did an investigative report showing Spikes was protecting his grandchildren from the dogs a Harris County grand jury decided to clear the Houstonian of the charges.

=== Outtake ===
As a general assignment reporter in Arkansas, Carey often reported from remote and rural locations throughout the state. Reporting on the death of an adult chaperone at a football game at Augusta High School in 1996, Carey did several "stand-ups" to use in his story. During one of these stand-ups, a grasshopper flew into his mouth. Carey lost his composure and launched into a profanity-filled tirade about his hay fever, in a high-pitched Southern accent that contrasted with the deep voice and affirmative tone he normally uses on camera.

What really happened on that Thursday here at Augusta High School that led to Chris Woods' death—The fuck is that?! Shit! I'm dying in this fucking country ass fucked up town! Shit flying in my mouth...the fuck? I can't see, pollen—let's get the fuck out of this country motherfucker, I can't even see...

Although the bad take was never broadcast by the station, it was uploaded to YouTube in 2008 and became an internet phenomenon. The video was played on Jimmy Kimmel Live, ET and was featured on Howard Stern. It is also listed as one of the top viewed videos in any one day in Germany, Australia, Canada, the United Kingdom, Ireland, India, New Zealand, Mexico and France. In February 2009, the video was uploaded on Facebook and continues to receive thousands of hits a day, and two Carey Fanclubs have been established. The outtake was also parodied in the season two, episode 16 of The Cleveland Show, "The Way the Cookie Crumbles". In 2011, Carey was the subject of a "Web Redemption" on Tosh.0. An excerpt of the outtake was used in Michael Cera's 2014 album True That in the beginning seconds of the song "Moving In".

== Personal life ==
=== Arrest ===
Carey was arrested in October 2018 for driving while intoxicated in Montgomery County, Texas. The Houston Chronicle reported that his vehicle was swerving on the road, and authorities saw numerous indicators that Carey was intoxicated after performing a traffic stop. Carey later apologized for the incident in social media posts. During the early morning hours of February 7, 2025, Carey was arrested in Montgomery County, Texas, due to a second DWI offense.
