= WXOK =

Radio station in Port Allen, Louisiana

Coordinates: 30°27′38.7″N 91°14′37.4″W

- Port Allen, Louisiana; United States
- Broadcast area: Baton Rouge metropolitan area
- Frequency: 1460 kHz
- Branding: Heaven 95.7

Programming
- Format: Urban gospel

Ownership
- Owner: Cumulus Media; (Radio License Holding CBC, LLC)
- Sister stations: KQXL-FM, WRQQ, WEMX-FM

History
- First air date: 1948
- Former call signs: WAFB (1948–1957); WAIL (1957–1966)

Technical information
- Licensing authority: FCC
- Facility ID: 11606
- Class: B
- Power: 4,000 watts (day); 280 watts (night)
- Translator: 95.7 K239CX (Port Allen)

Links
- Public license information: Public file; LMS
- Webcast: Listen live
- Website: heaven1460.com

WXOK (1460 AM, "Heaven 95.7") is an American urban gospel formatted radio station licensed to Port Allen, Louisiana (where the transmitter is located). The Cumulus Media station broadcasts with a transmitter power of 4,000 watts day and 280 watts night. Its translator K239CX (95.7 FM) broadcasts at 140 watts. Its studios are located in downtown Baton Rouge, Louisiana.

== History ==
1460 AM was first occupied by WAFB, which signed on in 1948 and was a MBS and ABC affiliate and sister station to WAFB-FM, which was on the 104.3 frequency, and WAFB-TV. Merchants Broadcasting purchased the WAFB radio stations in 1957 from WDSU's Modern Broadcasting, and changed the call letters of the AM station to WAIL.

WXOK has served the African-American community since February 3, 1953, with a mix of R&B hits, blues, jazz, and gospel until 2000, when it went full-time with the latter. The station was originally on 1260 kHz until its owners purchased WAIL in 1965 and moved WXOK to that frequency.

In the early 2020s, when WXOK 1460 started broadcasting on a translator at 95.7 FM, they rebranded as Heaven 95.7.

=== Former on-air staff ===
Isiah Carey, Carey L. Martin, Kip Holden
