= KQXL-FM =

Coordinates: 30.624°N 91.164°W

- New Roads, Louisiana; United States
- Broadcast area: Baton Rouge, Louisiana
- Frequency: 106.5 MHz
- Branding: Q106.5

Programming
- Format: Urban adult contemporary

Ownership
- Owner: Cumulus Media; (Radio License Holding CBC, LLC)
- Sister stations: WEMX, WRQQ, WXOK

History
- First air date: 1979
- Former frequencies: 106.3 MHz (1979–1988)

Technical information
- Licensing authority: FCC
- Facility ID: 11607
- Class: C2
- ERP: 50,000 watts
- HAAT: 148 meters (486 ft)

Links
- Public license information: Public file; LMS
- Webcast: Listen live
- Website: q106dot5.com

KQXL-FM (106.5 MHz, "Q106.5") is an urban adult contemporary music formatted radio station serving the Baton Rouge, Louisiana, area. The Cumulus Media station operates with an effective radiated power (ERP) of 50 kW and is licensed to New Roads, Louisiana. Its studios are located downtown and the transmitter tower is located just north of Baton Rouge between the suburbs of Baker and Zachary. It is one of the highest rating radio stations in Baton Rouge.

== History ==
KQXL, which signed on as a Mainstream Urban in 1979 and was originally at 106.3 until a power upgrade in 1988, began its evolution into its current format in 1997 after it was paired with former competitor WEMX-FM.

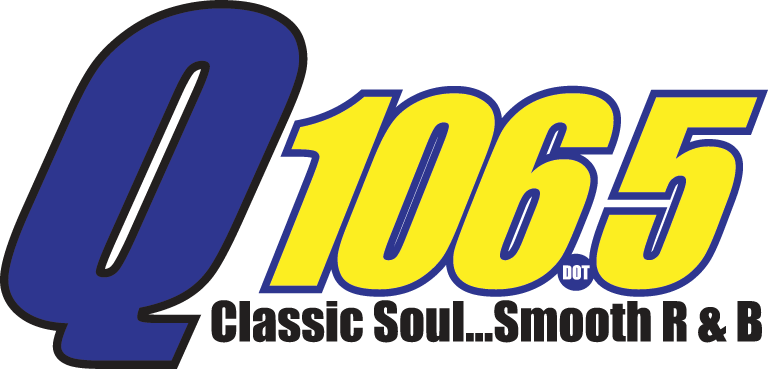
Logo under previous slogan

=== Former on-air staff ===
- Isiah Carey currently works as a reporter for KRIV, channel 26, in Houston, Texas.

== Programming ==
In addition to the R&B and Classic Soul featured as part of the format, KQXL carries two nationally syndicated shows: The Rickey Smiley Morning Show and The D.L Hughley Show.
