= WRQQ =

Radio station in Hammond–Baton Rouge, Louisiana

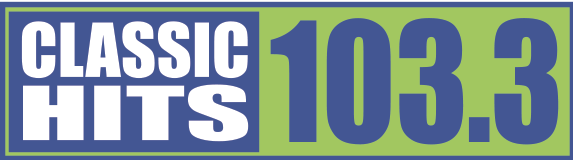
- Hammond, Louisiana; United States
- Broadcast area: Baton Rouge, Louisiana
- Frequency: 103.3 MHz (HD Radio)
- Branding: Classic Hits 103.3

Programming
- Format: Classic hits
- Affiliations: Premiere Networks; New Orleans Pelicans

Ownership
- Owner: Cumulus Media; (Radio License Holding CBC, LLC)
- Sister stations: KQXL-FM, WEMX, WXOK

History
- First air date: 1965; 61 years ago
- Former call signs: WKJN (1984–1989); WKJN-FM (1989–1999); WCAC (1999–2001); WBBE (2001–2005); WCDV (2005–2012)

Technical information
- Facility ID: 61271
- Class: C
- ERP: 100,000 watts
- HAAT: 306 meters (1,004 ft)
- Transmitter coordinates: 30°24′6.00″N 90°50′43.00″W

Links
- Webcast: Listen live Listen Live (iHeart)
- Website: classichits1033.com

WRQQ (103.3 FM, "Classic Hits 103.3") is a classic hits music formatted radio station serving the Baton Rouge, Louisiana, area. The station is owned by Cumulus Media and its city of license is Hammond, Louisiana. Its studios are located downtown and the transmitter tower is southeast of Denham Springs, Louisiana.

== History ==
Previous formats were country as both WKJN (Kajun 103 FM) beginning in 1984 and WCAC (Cat Country 103) from 1998 to 2001. Adult contemporary as WBBE (B-103) from 2001 to 2005, and becoming WCDV (Diva 103.3) on June 10, 2005. They were patterned after sister station WDVW ("Diva 92.3") New Orleans, Louisiana and both used the "Music For The Diva In You" slogan.

Logo as "Sunny 103.3"

On September 18, 2006, WCDV dropped the Diva format and returned to its former AC direction, becoming "Sunny 103.3, Today's Refreshing Soft Rock". Sunny 103.3 features Jeff and Company weekday mornings, The At Work Network with Elizabeth Eads during middays and the syndicated "The John Tesh Radio Show" airing in the afternoons.

On September 25, 2008, the New Orleans Hornets announced that Sunny 103.3 would be the Baton Rouge flagship station for the team's radio network. The New Orleans flagship will be KMEZ. The team has also signed agreements with 18 other radio stations across the states of Louisiana and Mississippi to broadcast Hornets games for the 2008–09 season.

On February 15, 2010, Sunny 103.3 became "Music for Generation X" playing music from the 90s, ranging from Red Hot Chili Peppers to Vanilla Ice to Sir Mix-a-lot. Citadel merged with Cumulus Media on September 16, 2011.

On July 24, 2012, WCDV changed their call letters to WRQQ.

On September 13, 2013, WRQQ changed their format to classic hits, branded as "Classic Hits 103.3".
