= BREC's Baton Rouge Zoo =

Baton Rouge Zoo
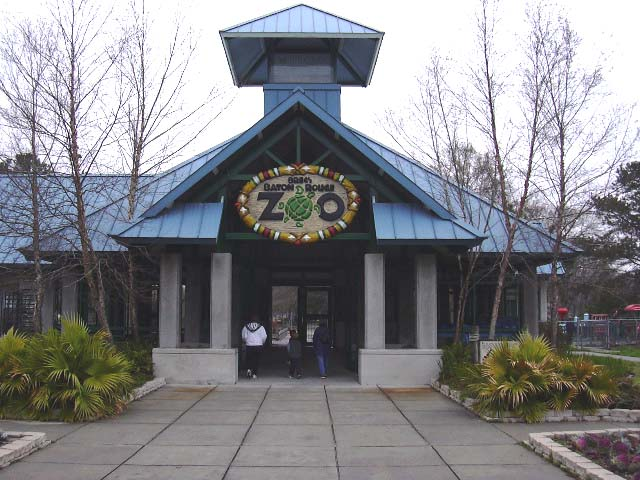
- Baton Rouge Zoo
- Interactive map of Baton Rouge Zoo
- 30°33′44″N 91°9′36″W
- Date opened: March 29, 1970
- Location: Baton Rouge, Louisiana
- Land area: 103 acres (42 ha)
- No. of animals: 800
- Memberships: AZA
- Website: www.brzoo.org

BREC's Baton Rouge Zoo is located 15 minutes north of downtown Baton Rouge, Louisiana, United States. The zoo is owned and operated by the Recreation and Park Commission of East Baton Rouge Parish, Louisiana (BREC), and is home to over 800 animals from around the world. The zoo was first accredited by the Association of Zoos and Aquariums (AZA) in 1977 — the first zoo in Louisiana to be accredited. The zoo lost its accreditation in March 2018 due to infrastructure issues and animal escapes, but regained it in 2024.

== History ==
A local WAFB TV personality by the name of "Buckskin" Bill ended his popular children's program in the 1950s and 1960s by saying "Baton Rouge needs a zoo." He helped rally the Baton Rouge community into supporting the zoo not only in passing the millage election to fund it but also in running a penny drive that raised over 600,000 pennies to purchase the zoo's first two elephants, Penny and Penny Two. The zoo first opened to the public on Easter Sunday, 1970.

In 2013, the zoo shuttered its original elephant exhibit, which held a maximum of two elephants. In 2012, the AZA had announced that for a zoo to remain accredited, its elephant enclosures must support at least three elephants by 2016.

In 2018, the zoo sought to relocate from its long-time home in Greenwood Park in north Baton Rouge to Airline Highway Park, citing a need for additional space to modernize the zoo's enclosures and facilities; however, BREC commissioners rejected the proposal. Subsequently, the zoo lost its AZA accreditation.

In December 2018, the zoo announced a multi-phase, multi-million-dollar effort to update the zoo to regain its AZA accreditation. It is the first park-wide improvement plan for the zoo since its opening in 1970. As of August 2022, the first phase of improvements, including a new entry plaza, giraffe enclosure, and improved pygmy hippo, jaguars, bear, and bird exhibits, were scheduled to be complete in autumn 2023.

== Exhibits ==
- Otter Pond includes a replica of a fishing cabin, from which visitors can see the zoo's North American river otters underwater.
- La Aquarium de Louisiana is an air conditioned building near the back of the zoo featuring native fish, amphibians, reptiles and arachnids from around Louisiana.
- Realm of the Tiger opened in 2010 as part of a $5 million overhaul of the zoo. There are 4 main enclosures featuring two tiger subspecies, the Malayan tiger and Sumatran tiger. Nearby is an enclosure for siamangs and a walkthrough aviary that houses crested wood partridges, fulvous whistling ducks, green junglefowl, mandarin ducks, Nicobar pigeons, pied imperial pigeons and Victoria crowned pigeons.
- Flamingo Cove is home to a large flock of Chilean flamingos.
- Giants of the Islands features both species of giant tortoise alive today, Aldabra giant tortoises and Galapagos giant tortoises.
- Africa features a wide variety of African animals including cheetah, eastern black rhinoceros, reticulated giraffe, plains zebra, Thomson's gazelle, nyala, sable antelope, bongo, pygmy hippopotamus, eastern black-and-white colobus, red river hog, Nubian ibex, ostrich and Egyptian goose.
- South America contains the Baird's tapir, jaguar, maned wolf, spectacled bear, black-handed spider monkey, capybara and crested screamer.
- KidsZoo has various breeds of goats such as African Pygmy goats, Nigerian Dwarf goats and Nubian goats, Gulf Coast Native sheep, Mediterranean miniature donkeys, rabbits as well as a few waterfowl like Indian Runner ducks and toulouse geese.

Other animals housed in the zoo include American alligator, American white pelican, bald eagle, black-necked swan, brown pelican, Celebes crested macaque, cinnamon teal, De Brazza's monkey, demoiselle crane, emu, green-winged teal, Indian peafowl, Indian rhinoceros, Kirk's dik-dik, lion-tailed macaque, rhinoceros hornbill, ringed teal, Rocky Mountain elk, roseate spoonbill, Ross's turaco, saddle-billed stork, southern cassowary, wattled crane, white-necked raven, white-tailed deer and wild turkey.

== Conservation and education ==
The zoo participates in more than 30 Species Survival Plans, including those for the eastern black rhinoceros, and golden lion tamarin which have been successfully reintroduced into the wild.

The zoo has education programs including outreach, reading programs, day camps, classes, teacher workshops, and demonstrations. Together these programs reach more than 45,000 children each year. The zoo also works with departments of the Louisiana State University School of Veterinary Medicine when conducting research.
