= WEMX =

Coordinates: 30.862389°N 90.926194°W

- Kentwood, Louisiana; United States
- Broadcast area: Baton Rouge, Louisiana McComb, Mississippi
- Frequency: 94.1 MHz
- Branding: Max 94.1

Programming
- Format: Urban contemporary
- Affiliations: Compass Media Networks

Ownership
- Owner: Cumulus Media; (Radio License Holding CBC, LLC)
- Sister stations: KQXL-FM, WRQQ, WXOK

History
- First air date: 1967
- Former call signs: WCCA (1967–1986); WXLT (1986–1993); WYCT (1993–1996)
- Call sign meaning: "Max"

Technical information
- Licensing authority: FCC
- Facility ID: 58931
- Class: C1
- ERP: 100,000 watts
- HAAT: 299 meters (981 ft)

Links
- Public license information: Public file; LMS
- Webcast: Listen live
- Website: max94one.com

WEMX (94.1 FM, "Max 94.1") is an American radio station serving the Baton Rouge area. The Cumulus Media station broadcasts with an ERP of 100 kW and is licensed to Kentwood, Louisiana. WEMX broadcasts an urban contemporary music format. Its studios are located downtown and the transmitter tower is near Clinton, Louisiana.

The station was assigned the WEMX call sign by the Federal Communications Commission on November 1, 1996.

== History ==
The station originally signed on the air in 1967 in McComb, Mississippi as a country music outlet with the call letters WCCA. They would later change call letters to WXLT in 1986 while retaining the format. In 1993, WXLT relocated its COL to Kentwood, Louisiana and target the Baton Rouge area as WYCT, adopting a "Young Country" presentation in the hopes of attracting a younger audience and lure listeners away from WYNK. By 1996, WYCT changed its call letters to WEMX and adopted the handle Max 94.1 (as in "Maximum Country"), but after three years of trailing WYNK in the ratings, WEMX flipped to Hip Hop/R&B on January 1, 1997, this after being paired up with the format's previous occupant, KQXL-FM, who immediately shifted to Adult R&B. WEMX also kept the call letters and Max 94.1 handle intact after the switch.

In 1997, Citadel Broadcasting took over ownership of the station, which lasted until September 2011, when Cumulus became the owner after its acquisition of Citadel. In June 2013, WEMX transitioned from Urban to Rhythmic due to the addition of Rhythmic Pop product, resulting in the station being placed on Mediabase's Rhythmic panel that same month, with BDS following suit in May 2014. WEMX's shift to Rhythmic gives Cumulus two Rhythmics in Louisiana, joining sister station KBIU/Lake Charles. In January 2022, WEMX transitioned from Rhythmic to Urban due to the addition of Mainstream Urban product.
