= Galleria Dallas =

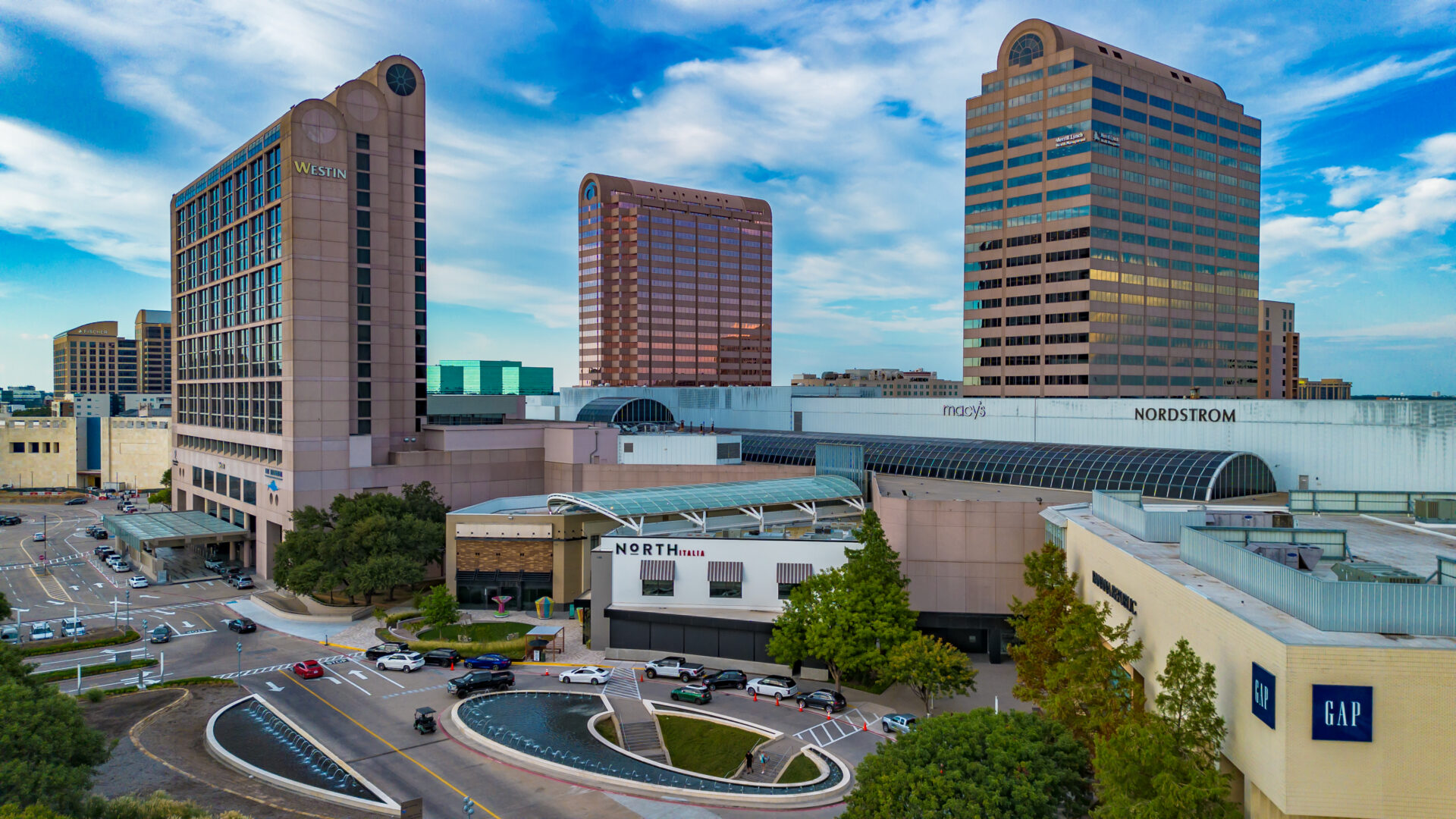
- West facing exterior of Galleria Dallas
- Location: Dallas, Texas
- Coordinates: 32°55′48.00″N 96°49′10″W
- Address: 13350 Dallas Parkway
- Opened: 1982; 44 years ago
- Developer: Hines Interests Limited Partnership
- Manager: Trademark Property Co.
- Owner: UBS Realty Investors LLC (UBS AG)
- Architect: HOK
- Num. of stores: 210+
- Num. of anchor tenants: 2
- Floor area: total: 1,700,000 sq ft (158,000 m^{2}) retail: 1,400,000 sq ft (130,000 m^{2})
- Floors: 4 (including ice level)
- Parking: 10,000+ spaces
- Website: www.galleriadallas.com

Galleria Dallas is a shopping mall and mixed-use development located at the intersection of Interstate 635 and the Dallas North Tollway in the North Dallas neighborhood of Dallas, Texas. It was originally developed by Hines Interests Limited Partnership in 1982. It was modeled after a similar Hines development, the Houston Galleria, which opened in 1970. Both have ice rinks and a glass vaulted ceiling that is modeled after the historic Galleria Vittorio Emanuele II in Milan, Italy. It features Macy's and Netflix House.

The mall also houses the Westin Galleria Hotel. The cost of constructing Galleria Dallas was at least $400 million ($1.16 billion, adjusted) when opened in 1982, ranking it as one of the most expensive construction projects for that year, following Walt Disney World's Epcot Center.

There are over 210 stores and restaurants, including an ice rink and the Westin Galleria Hotel. The property is owned by an investment consortium advised by UBS Realty Investors LLC, a subsidiary of UBS AG of Zürich, Switzerland, and is managed by Trademark Property Co.

== History ==
The Dallas Galleria opened on October 30, 1982, with anchor tenants Marshall Field's, Gump's, and Saks Fifth Avenue as well as a 432-room hotel The Westin Hotel Galleria Dallas, a General Cinema Corporation multiplex theater, and a University Club fitness facility. By 1985, the mall had expanded with a Macy's anchor store. On September 7, 1985, the mall was the location of WFAA-TV Channel 8's Sump'n Else bandstand program's 20th Anniversary live reunion special hosted by Ron Chapman and Ralph Baker Jr. with special appearances by "The Little Group" dancers and Kenny and the Kasuals, and was also simulcast live on KVIL.

In 1991, Gump's closed both of its Galleria locations, in Houston and Dallas. In November 1995, the mall underwent a 75,000 square feet (7,000 m^{2}) expansion. In March 1996, Nordstrom opened as the anchor tenant of this new wing. In 1997, Marshall Field's sold all of its Texas locations, including the location at the mall. Saks Fifth Avenue purchased the vacant Marshall Field's anchor, renovated it, and relocated its store in 1999. The original Saks Fifth Avenue anchor building was later converted into a Gap Inc. megastore, with Banana Republic on the first floor, Gap on the second, and Old Navy on the third. In October 2000, the General Cinema theater closed. In 2002, Hines Interests sold the mall to UBS Realty Investors LLC of Hartford, Connecticut, for $300 million. By 2003, a major renovation began and the mall's name was changed to "Galleria Dallas."

In April 2005, UBS Realty Investors LLC acquired the adjoining The Westin Galleria Dallas from Hines Interests for $95 million.

In April 2009, General Growth Properties, the management company of the mall, declared bankruptcy. Simon Property Group assumed management effective August 1, 2009.

On June 15, 2013, Saks Fifth Avenue closed. It was replaced in 2014 by Belk.

In May 2018, Trademark Property Co. was hired to manage, lease, and renovate the mall.

On January 23, 2020, it was announced that Belk would close on March 21, 2020.

On November 18, 2022, Nordstrom closed its third floor. The first and second floors remained open.

On November 18, 2023, Louis Vuitton and Bachendorfs expanded their locations at the center.

On February 20, 2024, American Girl closed their store outside of the center, and relocated to The Shops at Park Lane on March 2, 2024.

On May 23, 2024, H&M Home opened its first location in the Southwest.

On October 18, 2024, the first UNIQLO in DFW opened at the center. Uniqlo soon after opened locations at The Parks Mall at Arlington and Stonebriar Centre.

In 2025, the mall underwent renovations, including updates to the ice skating center, remodeled restrooms, and a new corridor between the Westin Hotel and the mall. Green space has been added to the west-facing side of the mall. The mall was ranked by USA Today as the 3rd best mall in the United States.

On December 11, 2025, Netflix House, an experiential retail location run by the streaming company, opened its second location in the bottom two floors of the former Belk anchor store. Additional renovation plans to the mall were revealed, including a renovated food court seating area and a new mall entrance on the first floor of the mall, in the former Pottery Barn space.

In March 2026, Nordstrom announced they would fully close their anchor store on May 16th. Beginning May 2026, Galleria Dallas began renovating its center court, replacing the blue panels with off-white panels, and adding additional signage and seating to the rink level.

== Gallery ==
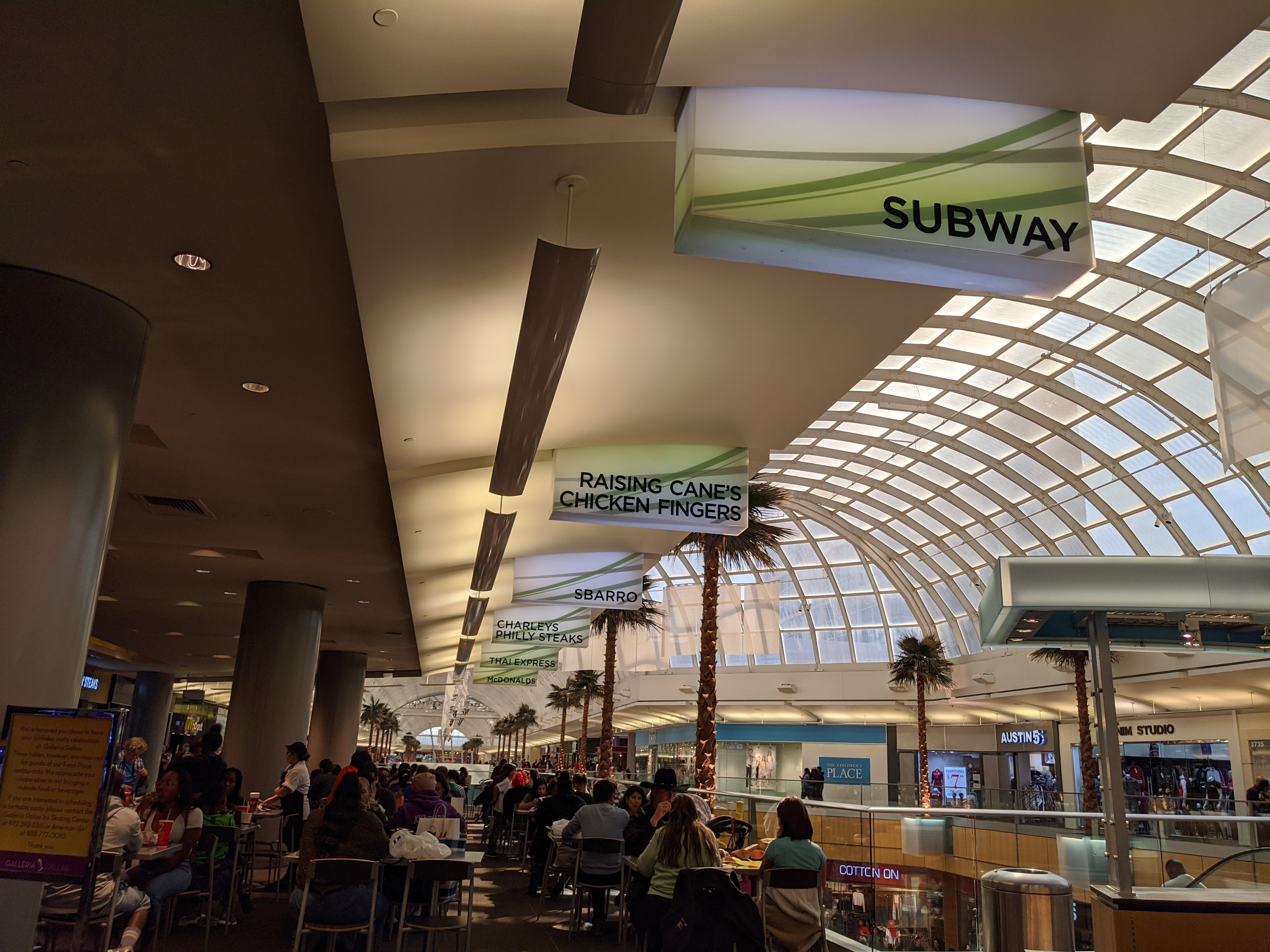
Food court near the Nordstrom and Belk locations on the 3rd level

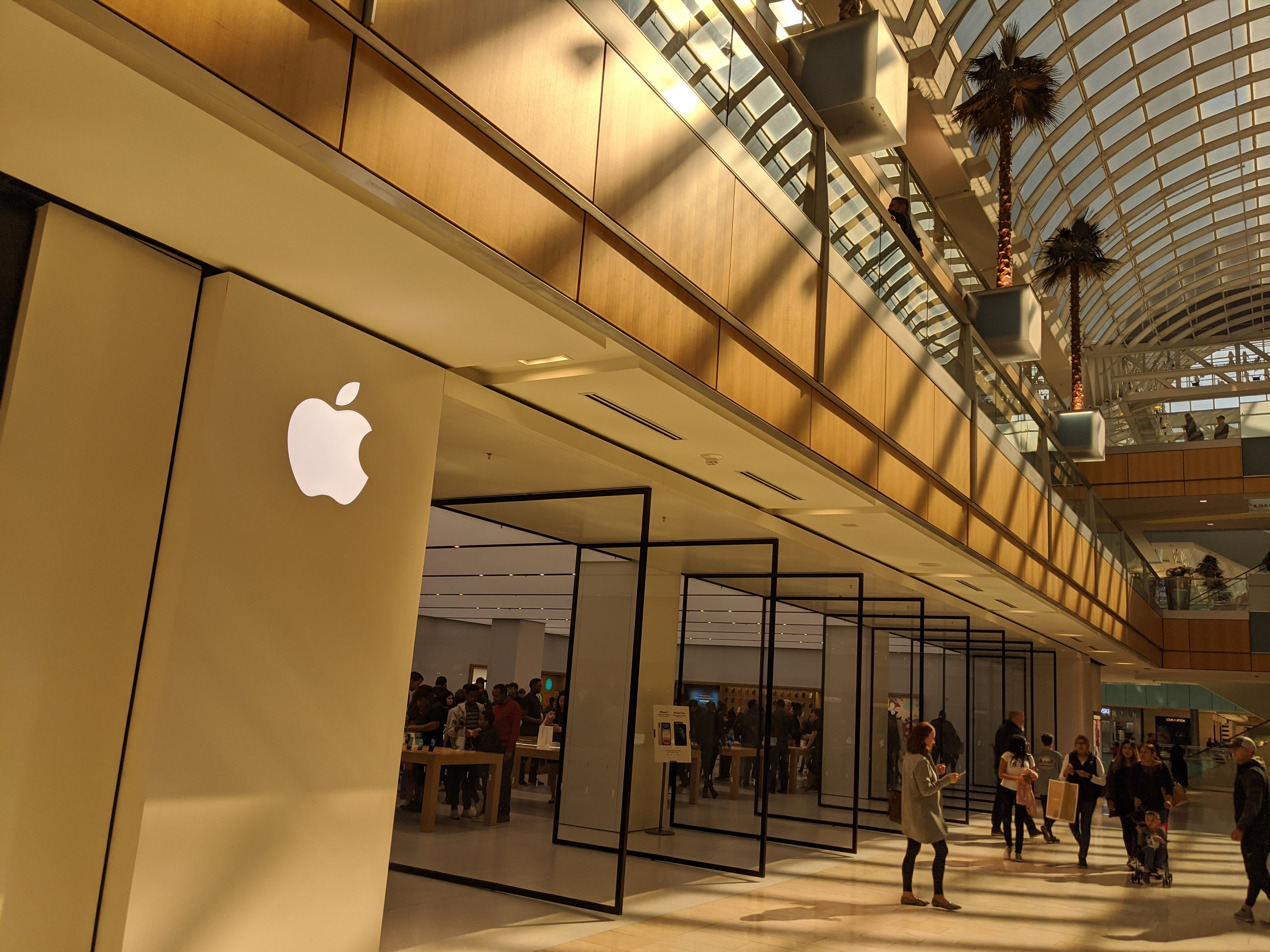
Apple Store near the ice rink on the 2nd level

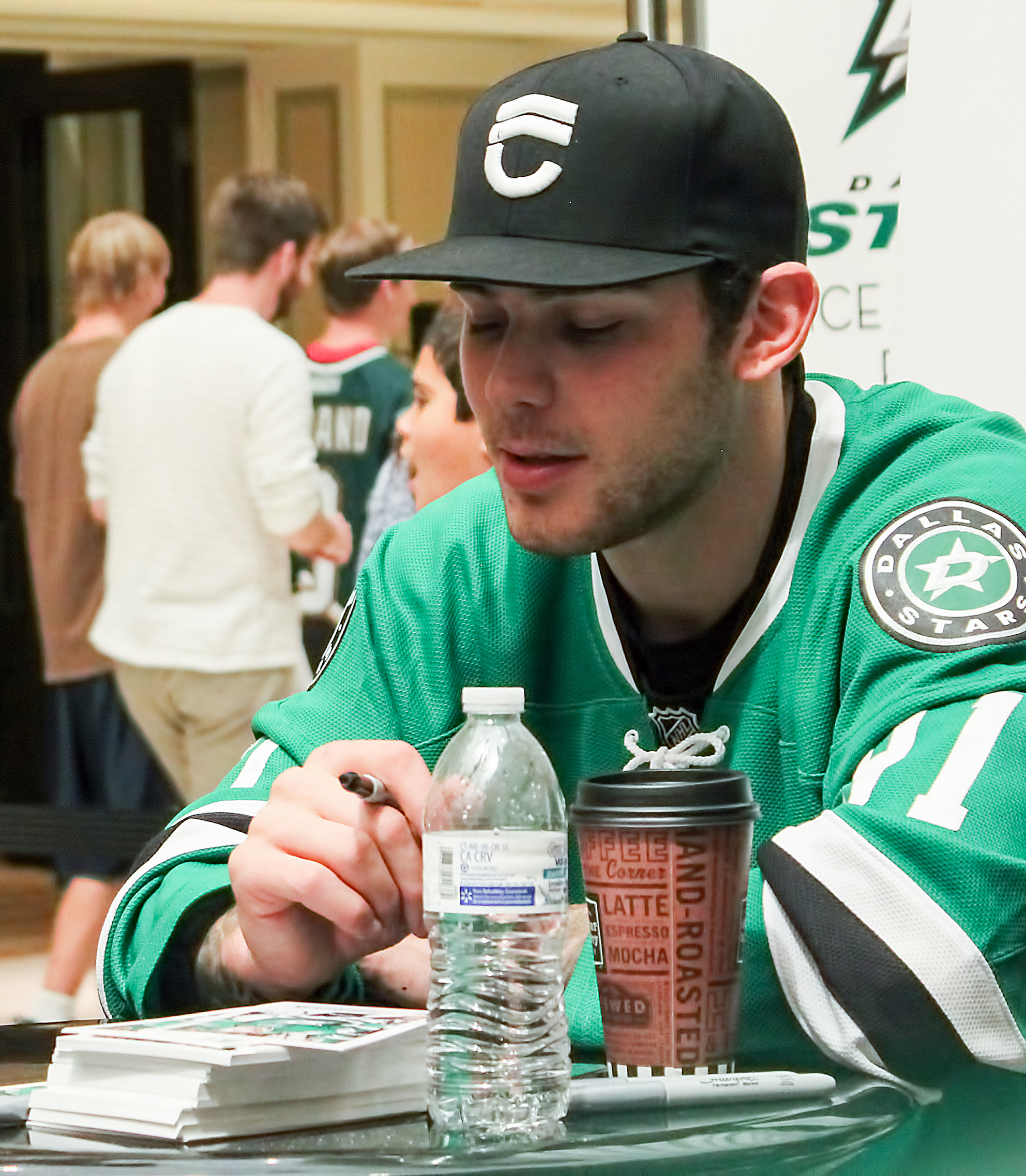
Dallas Stars player Tyler Seguin signing autographs at Galleria Dallas in 2014

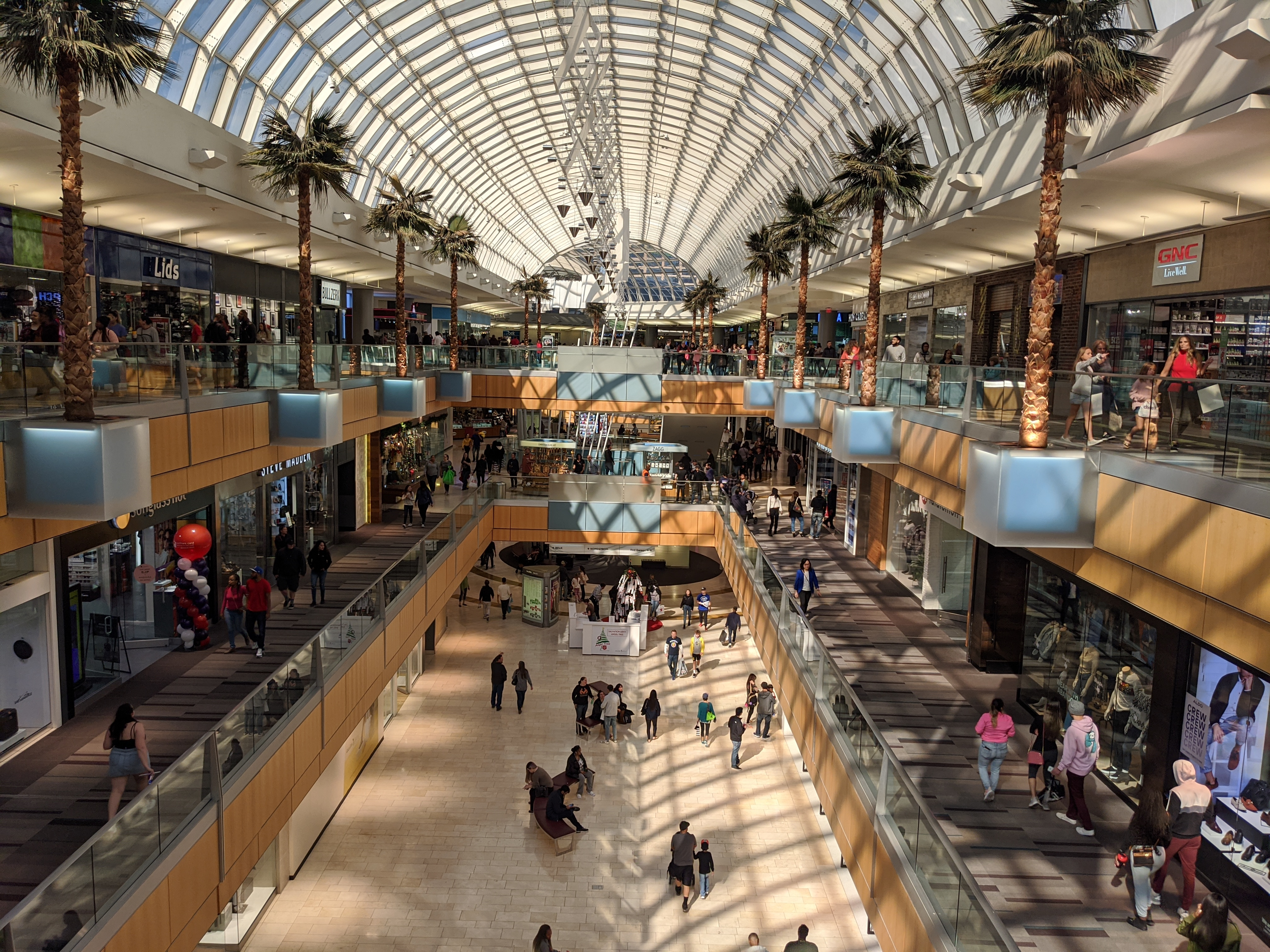
Looking west from the atrium on the 3rd level

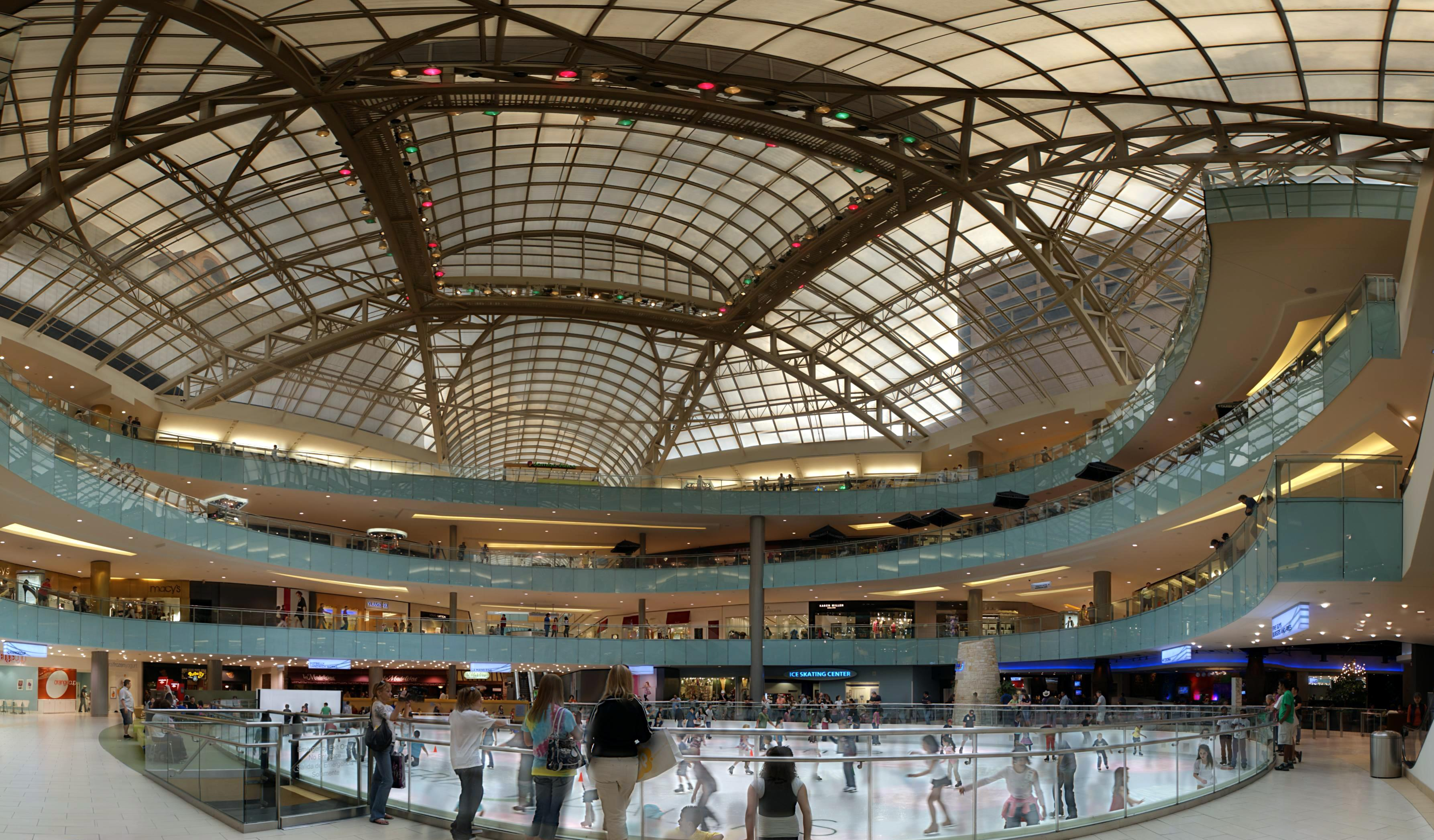
Ice rink in the Galleria mall

== See also ==
- List of shopping malls in Dallas, Texas
