= McCaa =

McCaa is a surname. Notable people with the surname include:

- George McCaa (1884–1960), American footballer and coach
- John McCaa (born 1954), American television journalist

== See also ==
- Michigan Community College Athletic Association (MCCAA)
