= Troy Dungan =

American weatherman (born 1936)

- Born: William Troy Dungan Jr. November 17, 1936 (age 89); Hillsboro, Texas, US
- Education: Baylor University
- Occupations: Television; Weather
- Years active: 1958-2013
- Known for: WFAA-TV Chief Meteorologist July 19, 1976-July 18, 2007
- Notable credits: KTRK-TV 1964-1972; WCAU 1972-1974; WXYZ-TV 1974-1976; KTXD-TV 2012-2013
- Title: Weather Anchor
- Successor: Pete Delkus
- Spouse: Janet Dungan
- Children: Leah, Dana, and Wyn-Erin

William Troy Dungan Jr. (born November 17, 1936), better known as Troy Dungan, was the former chief weather anchor at WFAA-TV in Dallas, Texas for 30 years.

Dungan graduated from Baylor University, where he earned a Bachelor's degree. He received private meteorological training from the National Engineering Science Company in Houston while employed at KTRK-TV.

Dungan began his career at KWTX-TV in Waco, Texas in 1958. After working in Orlando, KTRK-TV in Houston, then CBS O&O WCAU in Philadelphia, and then ABC O&O WXYZ-TV in Detroit—Dungan joined ABC affiliate, WFAA-TV, in Dallas as chief weather anchor on July 19, 1976. At WCAU he was the first weatherman to use the current 5-day forecast system. Before 1976, weather predictions were typically for a maximum of two days ahead.

Since July 19, 2006, the day of Dungan's 30th anniversary with WFAA-TV, he presented the weather only during News 8 at Six, with Pete Delkus taking over his duties at News 8 at Five and The News 8 Update (10 p.m.). This was to facilitate the transition from Dungan to Delkus as chief meteorologist/weather anchor for WFAA-TV. Troy's last day was July 18, 2007.

== Awards ==
Since then he has been named the Best Television Weathercaster by the Texas Associated Press Broadcasters Association eight times. The Dallas Observer has named Dungan the Best Television Weathercaster five times. Dungan has also received the Knight of the Press Award, and special recognition from the National Oceanic Atmospheric Association Research Flight Facility for his work on a documentary film dealing with the subject of hurricanes. The Dallas Press Club has also bestowed the Katie Award onto him.

== Personal ==
Dungan started wearing bow ties in 1974 on WXYZ-TV after an ice-fishing story on Pontiac Lake.

Dungan served as the spokesman for 'Santa's Helpers', which provides thousands of toys to needy children throughout Dallas and Fort Worth, Texas.
