= Executive Suite (TV series) =

American television series (1976–1977)

- Genre: Drama
- Country of origin: United States
- Original language: English
- No. of seasons: 1
- No. of episodes: 20 (2 unaired) (list of episodes)

Production
- Running time: 60 minutes
- Production companies: Arena Productions; MGM Television

Original release
- Network: CBS
- Release: September 20, 1976 – February 11, 1977

Executive Suite is an American primetime soap opera which premiered on September 20, 1976. Loosely based on the 1954 film of the same name, it follows the personal and professional pressures of board members at the Cardway Corporation, a large conglomerate based in California. The show was cancelled after five months, with its last episode airing on February 11, 1977.

== Cast and characters ==
Starring

- Mitchell Ryan as Don Walling
- Stephen Elliott as Howell Rutledge
- Sharon Acker as Helen Walling
- Leigh McCloskey as Brian Walling

Co-starring (in alphabetical order)

- Richard Cox as Mark Desmond
- Gwyda Donhowe as Astrid Rutledge
- Paul Lambert as Tom Dalessio
- Byron Morrow as Pearce Newberry
- Trisha Noble as Yvonne Holland
- Wendy Phillips as Stacey Walling
- Joan Prather as Glory Dalessio
- Madlyn Rhue as Hilary Madison
- Percy Rodriguez as Malcolm Gibson
- William Smithers as Anderson Galt
- Maxine Stuart as Marge Newberry
- Brenda Sykes as Summer Johnson
- Carl Weintraub as Harry Ragin

Executive Suite revolves around the power struggle between Don Walling (Mitchell Ryan), the board chairman of the company, and Howell Rutledge (Stephen Elliott), his chief rival and the company's hard-nosed senior vice president. Don is supported by his wife Helen (Sharon Acker), prodigal son Brian (Leigh McCloskey), who has recently returned from Europe, and daughter Stacey (Wendy Phillips), who is often involved in radical politics, to her family's dismay. Howell is assisted in his schemes by his equally conniving wife, Astrid (Gwyda Donhowe).

Other major characters include Hilary Madison (Madlyn Rhue), Cardway's only female board member and vice president of advertising, Mark Desmond (Richard Cox), head of consumer relations, members of the board Pearce Newberry (Byron Morrow), Malcolm Gibson (Percy Rodriguez) and Anderson Galt (William Smithers), Tom Dalessio (Paul Lambert), Brian's boss at the chemical plant, his daughter Glory (Joan Prather), who is having an affair with Andy Galt, Glory's black roommate Summer (Brenda Sykes), who becomes involved in an interracial romance with Brian, Mark's lover and former porn star Yvonne (Trisha Noble) and union rep Harry Ragin (Carl Weintraub).

Recurring characters include Yvonne's husband and porn producer Burt Holland (Lloyd Bochner), Cardway's business rival Sharon Coby (Joanna Barnes), her spy Nick Koslo (Scott Marlowe), who becomes involved with Hilary, Nick's son B.J. (Moosie Drier), lumber company owner Paul Duquesne (James Luisi), Sy Bookerman (John Randolph), Summer's brother Walter (Nat Jones), who disapproves of her relationship with Brian, Galt's wife Leona (Patricia Smith), who has a lesbian affair with Julie (Geraldine Brooks) that ends in tragedy, and theatre director David Valerio (Ricardo Montalbán), who becomes involved with Helen.

== Episodes ==
No.	Title	Directed by	Written by	Original release date	Viewers (millions)
1	"Re: The Secret"	Joseph Hardy & Charles S. Dubin	Henry Slesar, Barbara Avedon & Barbara Corday	September 20, 1976	18.4
Mark, the new board nominee of the company president, faces fierce opposition. A factory plant is rocked by a terrorist's bomb.
2	"Re: The Trap"	Charles S. Dubin	Henry Slesar, Barbara Avedon & Barbara Corday	September 27, 1976	12.8
Brian finds out that his sister Stacey is involved in terrorist activities. The Rutledges put up a fight against the new board nominee.
3	"Re: The Porno Ploy"	Joseph Pevney	Peter Allan Fields	October 4, 1976	12.8
Yvonne's husband Burt threatens to reissue her pornographic film Flower of Paradise.
4	"Re: The Serpent's Tooth"	Charles S. Dubin	Don Brinkley	October 18, 1976	18.4
Yvonne takes an overdose of sleeping pills but is saved by Howell. Stacey is arrested for planting the bomb. Hilary and Nick continue to develop their relationship, but he secretly has another agenda.
5	"Re: A Day Full of Surprises"	Joseph Pevney	Ann Marie Barlow & Don Brinkley	October 25, 1976	15.7
Glory leaves Galt and exposes their affair to his wife. Stacey is released to her parents.
6	"Re: People Who Live in Glass Houses"	Vincent Sherman	Barbara Avedon & Barbara Corday	November 8, 1976	13.4
Don has the company barbecue at his house, which is interrupted by a photographer. Rutledge is under investigation by the government and suffers a heart attack during a confrontation with Don.
7	"Re: Power Play"	Joseph Pevney	Peter Allan Fields	November 15, 1976	12.7
A power struggle erupts among Rutledge's associates while he is in hospital. Nick almost gets exposed by Tom for industrial espionage, but Sharon Cody refuses to let him off the hook.
8	"Re: Fear of Falling"	Vincent Sherman	Richard Fielder & Peter Allan Fields	November 22, 1976	13.1
Walling convinces Rutledge to undergo heart surgery. Walling and Gibson set a trap for Nick using hidden cameras, and Hilary is devastated to learn the truth about him.
9	"Re: Who Shall Bring Mercy?"	Charles S. Dubin	Daniel Weisburd	November 29, 1976	17.2
Hilary takes in Nick's young son when Nick is arrested. Leona starts spending time away from her husband with her friend Julie.
10	"Re: The Sounds of Silence"	Vincent Sherman	Barbara Avedon & Barbara Corday	December 6, 1976	15.6
Brian and Summer break up after his parents learn they want to move into together. Hilary wins temporary custody of B.J. while Nick is sentenced to a year in prison.
11	"Re: What Are Patterns For?"	Joseph Pevney	Don Brinkley	December 13, 1976	12.6
Andy confronts Leona after hearing rumors she and Julie are lovers. Helen wants to find more fulfillment with her work and meets drama coach David Valerio. Leona confesses her feelings to Julie, before Julie is struck down by a truck.
12	"Re: The Identity Crisis"	Unknown	Unknown	December 20, 1976	14.7
Don tries to convince Malcolm Gibson, the only black board member, to break up Brian and Summer. Leona feels guilty after being confronted by Julie's husband at her funeral. Helen becomes attracted to David.
13	"Re: The Dominant Sex"	Unknown	Unknown	January 3, 1977	13.9
Summer struggles to tell Brian that she is pregnant with his child. David convinces Helen to rejoin the theater group.
14	"Re: Kin Less than Kind"	Unknown	Unknown	January 14, 1977	12.2
Astrid blames herself for Howell's sudden impotence. Walter arranges an abortion for Summer's baby, despite their grandmother's objection. Andy realizes Leona's sanity is slipping away.
15	"Re: The Woman Inside"	Unknown	Unknown	January 21, 1977	10.5
Stacey begins an affair with the new foreman Harry Ragin. Leona attempts to hosts a dinner party but slips into a catatonic state. Summer's grandmother tells Brian about Summer's pregnancy.
16	"Re: The Rules of Seduction"	Unknown	Unknown	January 28, 1977	6.0
Brian stops Summer from having an abortion. Howell tells Astrid that he thinks Helen and David are having an affair.
17	"Re: Passionate Journey"	Unknown	Unknown	February 4, 1977	7.2
Don meets Bree MacIntire, the sexy wife of a business client, who later leads Helen to believe Don has been unfaithful. Before he and Helen can consummate their affair, David is accidentally shot and killed after being mistaken as a burglar.
18	"Re: Aftermath of a Tragedy"	Unknown	Unknown	February 11, 1977	9.7
Helen and Don confront each other about their "affairs". Brian and Stacey try to bring the family together.
19	"Re: The Topless Towers of Illium"	N/A	N/A	Unaired	N/A
20	"Re: A House Divided"	N/A	N/A	Unaired	N/A
