= Ralph Baker Jr. =

American broadcaster and actor

Ralph Durwood Baker Jr. (February 3, 1945 – July 16, 2008) was an American broadcaster and actor. He was known for being a co-host of The Group and Chapman and Sump'n Else shows on WFAA-TV. He was known for being a DJ and announcer at KLIF-AM, one of the first Top 40 radio stations. Ralph was a "Teen Idol" broadcaster in the 1960s and was heard and seen in many television and radio commercials as well. In the mid-1960s he became known as "The Sanger-Harris Man" and was an official model for the Sanger-Harris department store. He starred in Night Fright, a 1967 American science-fiction film that was shot near Dallas, Texas.

== Personal life ==
Ralph Durwood Baker Jr. was born on February 3, 1945, in Dallas, Texas, to his parents Ralph Baker Sr, and Marjorie Baker. He grew up in the Highland Park neighborhood of Dallas. As a teenager he attended Highland Park High School. He graduated high school in 1963.

In the summer of 1965 Ralph was visiting a Dallas hotel where he met a young woman named Calleen Anderegg. She told him that she had just moved to Dallas from Salt Lake City, Utah, and that she hoped to become an actress and television personality. Baker told her that he was producing a program at WFAA-TV and had her audition for the producers of the show. She would become a regular member of The Group as well. Ralph and Calleen were often seen together on air.

Though Ralph was once always seen with Calleen Anderegg, he had grown up with a girl by the name of Elizabeth McCord and always loved her. He married her in July 1995 and she later gave birth to his daughter Bailey Margaret Baker on January 16, 1996.

== Broadcasting career ==
In 1963 Ralph was hired by WFAA-TV to help produce and star in a local bandstand program called The Group and Harrigan with popular KLIF DJ Ron Chapman who was known to D/FW as Irving Harrigan. Ron was already co-host of the Charlie and Harrigan Show on KLIF. They were told that they could not use the "Irving Harrigan" name because it belonged to the production team at KLIF. The program on WFAA became known as The Group and Chapman. Ralph's position in this program was to perform and lip-synch to top 40 hits of the time. The audience and performers would dance to the songs that were chosen. Joan Prather also joined the show around the same time. The show was broadcast every Saturday after the national ABC program The Hollywood Palace.

Ralph would become popular with promotion and also as a commercial announcer on D/FW television and radio.

=== The Sanger-Harris Man ===
Ralph took a position as a model for the Sanger-Harris department store and was seen in the department stores catalogs and storefront displays. He also would advertise and sell their products. He hosted the Sanger-Harris fashion segment on Sump'n Else since the store was a sponsor of the program.

=== KLIF announcer ===
Ralph took a position at KLIF as a late night announcer. He would be heard with the famous KLIF PAMS Jingles and play the top 40 hits of the time. He was now a broadcaster on the 50,000 watt AM Top 40 powerhouse. Ralph would continue to be a KLIF announcer and also announce commercials and promotions on the station while co hosting the Sump'n Else show at WFAA-TV.

Now Ralph had many different positions on DFW television and radio. He was frequently seen and heard on different television and radio stations.

In November 1967, Ralph teamed up with KBOX and KVIL-FM DJ and Announcer Frank Jolley and John Agar, former husband of Shirley Temple, to film a space science horror film called Night Fright. Other local talents got the parts as the co-stars of this film.

=== Sump'n Else changes ===
Some people came and went from the Sump'n Else show. Calleen Anderegg left for college in September 1967 but came back in January 1968. The Sump'n Else "Psychedelic Light Show" episode broadcast on WFAA-TV on January 26, 1968. Calleen Anderegg was back with Ralph for this episode. The set was re-designed with lights and props that could light up and change with the music they were performing to. A rotating light globe and mirror reflecting the back of the set were used for this episode. This was the last episode of Sump'n Else. The afternoon Dialing For Dollars program broadcast on WFAA-TV in the afternoons and afterwards the afternoon movie broadcast. Ron Chapman had joined the team of KVIL-FM in 1968. Calleen Anderegg also worked with Ron at the production team for a brief time.

Even after Sump'n Else ended, Ralph was still heard as a commercial announcer on KLIF and a commercial announcer on WFAA-TV. He continued to be The Sanger-Harris Man and his commercials were seen and heard all over Dallas Fort-Worth television and radio.

In 1970 Ralph left Dallas/Fort Worth to become a national model and actor. He was seen in many national television series.

He returned to Dallas in the 1980s and reunited with the Sump'n Else cast for the 20th Anniversary Episode on September 7, 1985.

=== Back home ===
In 1992 Ralph returned to Dallas and became a KRLD-AM news anchor and traffic reporter. The audience that grew up with him on WFAA-TV's Sump'n Else and KLIF Top 40 radio programs was now grown up. He was once again established and all over the D/FW broadcast airwaves.

In the mid- to late-2000s Ralph anchored KTEN-TV News.

When he was not on air or making appearances, Ralph and Elizabeth were busy raising their daughter.

== Later life ==
Ralph and his family settled back in Dallas after returning from KTEN. On July 16, 2008, Ralph suffered a heart attack and was taken to Presbyterian Hospital Of Dallas by wife Elizabeth. He died at the age of 63. He is succeeded by his wife Elizabeth and daughter Bailey, as well as Chase, Cash and Parris Paschal, his step-children from Elizabeth whom he loved as his own.

His daughter, Bailey Baker, is now 19 years old (as of 2015) and is an international Pop singer.
