= Night Fright =

- Directed by: James A. Sullivan
- Written by: Russ Marker
- Produced by: Wallace Clyce Jr.
- Starring: John Agar; Ralph Baker Jr.; Bill Thurman
- Cinematography: Robert C. Jessup
- Edited by: Arthur Sullivan
- Music by: Christopher Trussell
- Release date: November 1967
- Running time: 88 minutes 65 minutes (UK)
- Country: United States
- Language: English

Night Fright is a 1967 American science-fiction horror film directed by James A. Sullivan that was shot near Dallas, Texas.

In the early 1980s, the film was re-titled in the United Kingdom for VHS release as E.T.N.: The Extraterrestrial Nastie, E.T.N.: The Extraterrestrial Nasty, The Extraterrestrial Nastie and The Extraterrestrial Nasty .

== Plot summary ==
As part of NASA experiment Operation Noah's Ark, several animals are sent into space in a rocket, circling the moon and returning to Earth in order to test the effects of space on them.

Radiation interferes with the rocket's operation, mutates the animals and causes the rocket to crash land near Satan's Hollow, Texas. Locals think the crashing rocket is a UFO.

The Texas community is soon beset by a rash of mysterious killings, including of students from the local college who wanted to throw a party at the spaceship crash site.

When Sheriff Clint Crawford (John Agar) investigates the deaths he discovers the startling identity of the killer, an alligator mutated into an ogre-like creature. After the death of one of Crawford's deputies, Crawford learns that the monster is bullet-proof and all but unstoppable.

Scientist Professor Alan Clayton (Roger Ready) is called in to assist law enforcement and the mutant is eventually killed by luring it into a dynamite trap.

== Cast ==
- John Agar as Sheriff Clint Crawford
- Carol Gilley as Nurse Joan Scott
- Ralph Baker Jr. as Chris Jordan
- Dorothy Davis as Judy
- Bill Thurman as Deputy Ben Whitfield
- Roger Ready as Prof. Alan Clayton
- Gary McLain as Wes Blau
- Darlene Drew as Darlene Scott
- Frank Jolly as Rex Bowers
- Bill Holly as Deputy Pat Lance
- Janiz Menshew as Carla
- Russ Marker as Mitch
- Toni Pearce as Betty the Waitress
- Christi Simmons as Annie
- Brenda Venus as Sue
- Byron Lord as Government Man
- Ronnie Weaver as Government Man
- Olivia Pinion as Partygoer
- Nancy Mann as Partygoer
- Lewis Helm as Partygoer
- Jeanie Wilson as Mary Bennett
- Rod Paxton as Buddy Williams
- The Wildcats as Themselves

== Soundtrack ==
The soundtrack was performed by the Houston, Texas garage band The Wildcats. The band also played in another movie scored by Christopher Trussell also filmed in 1967 entitled Fulfillment: Something Worth Remembering.

== Reception ==
Creature Feature gave the movie 1.5 out of 5 stars calling it deadly dull and lacking imagination. Moria gave the movie 1/2 star. noting the monster design was a plus and John Agar does a good job as the sheriff, but overall the film is dreary and deserves its obscurity. Fantastic Musings found the movie a dreadful mistake. The Encyclopedia of Science Fiction found nothing noteworthy about the movie, other than for those interested in 1960s fashion or automobiles.

== Home Release ==
Released both as a solo DVD and as part of a set. Available for streaming as of December 2021 on YouTube

== See also ==
- List of American films of 1967
