= Sump'n Else =

1960s TV program

Sump'n Else is an American live teen dance television show that aired from 1965 to 1968 on Channel 8 WFAA-TV in Dallas, Texas, formatted similarly to American Bandstand.

== Hosts ==
The show featured Ron Chapman (who went on to local fame as the long-time morning host of KVIL 103.7 FM) as host. He was often joined by local television and radio commercial announcer Ralph Baker, Jr. as co-host. Baker, Jr. was also known as The Sanger-Harris Man, because he was a fashion model for the Sanger-Harris department store. He hosted the Sanger-Harris fashion segment on the Sump'n Else show. He was also a KLIF-AM announcer at the time. Ralph also discovered Little Group member Calleen Anderegg and auditioned her at WFAA on The Group and Chapman Show.

== National performers ==
The show featured guest performers such as The Monkees, Herman's Hermits, Paul Revere and the Raiders, The Rose Garden, 13th Floor Elevators, Sonny and Cher, The Outsiders and Frank Zappa.

== Dancers ==
Sump'n Else also featured go-go dancers, students from local high schools known as "The Little Group". The original four included Joanie Prather (who would later be known as Janet on Eight is Enough), Calleen Anderegg (Miss Dallas 1966), Delpha Teague, and Kathy Forney. The second "Little Group" included Cheryl Lovett, Martha Latimer, Becky Ballard, Melody Coleman and Pat Osborne.

== Local performers ==
The Sump'n Else show featured local bands including The Five Americans, The Uniques, The Novas, The Menerals, Those Guys, Kenny and the Kasuals, The Briks, Mouse and the Traps, Kit and the Outlaws, Johnathan's Experiences, The Dancing Bear, The Chaparrals, The Glad Ones, Living End, Redcoats, Tracers, The Outcasts and The Visions.

== Popularity ==
Sump'n Else was an afternoon staple on Channel 8, attracting high school students from throughout North Texas. The program broadcast live from a NorthPark Center storefront studio which featured a soundproof window. When major acts appeared, police officers were located both inside and outside the mall directing traffic and handling the crowds. A youth-oriented clothing store called Pois'n Ivy opened next to the studio and advertised on the show, capitalizing on the program's local popularity.

== Psychedelia ==
On December 7, 1967, an episode of Sump'n Else called "LSD: Insight or Insanity?" featured psychedelic props and techniques along with a public service documentary. On January 22, 1968, the show broadcast a special episode called the "Psychedelic Light Show"; the set had been redesigned to feature lighting that changed with the music.

== Aftermath ==
The final broadcast of Sump'n Else was on January 26, 1968. WFAA put an afternoon Dialing for Dollars program on that slot, and showed a movie after the game show. Ron Chapman joined the team of KVIL-FM and later was teamed up with Suzie Humphreys, who also hosted a WFAA morning program. Chapman was at KVIL-FM from 1968 to 2000. In 2000 he joined sister station KLUV-FM which is an oldies station. (Ironically, Chapman's final home at KLUV 98.7 FM once was the sister FM station to his original home at KLIF-AM. It originally was licensed as KLIF-FM and simulcasted KLIF-AM programming from 1963 - 1966. In 1966 it was re-licensed as KNUS and operated separately from KLIF-AM. In the early 1980s, after a series of ownership changes, KNUS became KLUV and adopted a rock-oldies format.) Christopher Haze was a drive-time disc-jockey for KNUS and was seen on the Sump'n Else show as a co-host as well. Ron Chapman retired from full-time broadcasting in the summer of 2005, but continued to be featured as a television/radio pitchman for many years thereafter prior to his death in April 2021. Calleen Anderegg also worked briefly in the production team of KVIL-FM with Ron Chapman. Ralph Baker, Jr. still remained in the Dallas-Fort Worth broadcast market and continued to be heard as a commercial announcer on KLIF-AM and television commercials on WFAA and many other television and radio stations from the Dallas-Fort Worth area.

== Reunion ==
The 20th Anniversary Reunion Episode, hosted by Ron Chapman, was broadcast live from the Galleria Dallas shopping mall in Dallas on Sept. 7, 1985, in a simulcast with Channel 8 WFAA-TV and KVIL-FM. Ralph Baker, Jr. both "Little Groups" and recurring substitute members, and Kenny and the Kasuals were on this episode.
