= Smile (1975 film) =

1975 comedy film directed by Michael Ritchie

- Original theatrical poster by John Alvin
- Directed by: Michael Ritchie
- Screenplay by: Jerry Belson
- Produced by: Michael Ritchie
- Starring: Bruce Dern; Barbara Feldon; Michael Kidd; Geoffrey Lewis
- Cinematography: Conrad L. Hall
- Edited by: Richard A. Harris
- Music by: Dan Orsborn
- Distributed by: United Artists
- Release date: March 20, 1975 (USA Film Festival)
- Running time: 117 minutes
- Country: United States
- Language: English
- Budget: $1.3 million

Smile is a 1975 American satirical comedy film directed by Michael Ritchie, written by Jerry Belson, and starring Bruce Dern, Barbara Feldon, Michael Kidd, and Geoffrey Lewis. The film focuses on various personalities involved in a beauty pageant in Santa Rosa, California, and satirizes small-town America and its peculiarities, hypocrisies and artifice within and around the pageant.

Filmed on location in Santa Rosa, the film premiered at the USA Film Festival in Dallas, Texas, and opened theatrically in Los Angeles in July 1975 before screening at the 1975 New York Film Festival. Though it received generally favorable reviews from critics, the film was a box-office flop. In the years since its release, Smile went on to develop a cult following. It was adapted into a 1986 Broadway musical of the same name with songs by Marvin Hamlisch and Howard Ashman.

== Plot ==
Big Bob Freelander is a used car dealer, and the head judge of the Young American Miss Pageant held in Santa Rosa, California. Brenda DiCarlo is the pageant's executive director, and her husband Andy is a resentful alcoholic. Andy is unhappy as he is about to become an exhausted rooster aging out of the local Jaycee chapter, which requires the humiliating ritual of kissing the anus of a dead chicken.

Thirty-three teenage girls, all local pageant winners from throughout the state, arrive in Santa Rosa where they are instructed by Brenda and assigned with local host families. Meanwhile, Little Bob, Big Bob's son, pores through the contestant applications analyzing the girls' breast sizes, and conspires with his friends to photograph the contestants in various states of undress.

The girls are introduced to Los Angeles choreographer Tommy French who teaches them dance routines. Wilson Shears, the pageant producer, clashes with Tommy, who is cynical and blunt with the contestants. The girls subsequently give interviews to the judges. While the girls shower in the auditorium locker rooms, Little Bob snaps Polaroids of them through a window but is caught by Wilson, who forces Little Bob to hand the photos over to a police officer.

At the Thursday preliminary show, novice contestant Robin Gibson is one of three winners. She later gets advice from her roommate, pageant veteran Doria Houston, on how to excel at the pageant, such as putting Vaseline on her teeth to improve her smile. The following morning, Big Bob takes Little Bob to a psychiatrist over the previous night's incident, but Dr. H. Malvert assures Big Bob that Little Bob is simply a sexually curious boy.

That night during a pageant performance, several contestants sabotage the gushing Mexican-American Maria Gonzales' patriotic routine, damaging the stage sets. Meanwhile, Andy visits the Jaycee chapter meeting, but fails to go through with the initiation ritual. When he returns home, he gets into an argument with Brenda and shoots her with a pistol, grazing her shoulder. Big Bob visits Andy in jail the next morning to provide moral support and espouse American values, but Andy insults him, accusing him of speaking like a Young American Miss. Meanwhile, the show becomes more expensive than was anticipated, and Wilson pressures Tommy to remove a ramp because it is taking up seating. This results in Doria getting injured, and Tommy agrees to reinstate the ramp and to make up the difference out of his fee.

Big Bob arrives at the final night of the pageant, which Brenda also attends despite her shoulder injury. After final judging, Miss Fountain Valley, Shawn Christianson — an outsider to the other contestants — unexpectedly wins the state title. Doria is named as a runner-up, having turned her final speech into a suggestion of a strip-tease.

The following morning, Robin passes by Big Bob's RV lot, where he is attempting to sell an RV to prospective customers. In a patrol car nearby, the policeman who confiscated Little Bob's photographs stares at a full-frontal nude photograph of Karen Love, Miss Simi Valley.

== Cast ==
- Bruce Dern as Big Bob Freelander
- Barbara Feldon as Brenda DiCarlo
- Michael Kidd as Tommy French
- Geoffrey Lewis as Wilson Shears
- Eric Shea as Little Bob Freelander
- Nicholas Pryor as Andy DiCarlo
- Titos Vandis as Emile Eidleman
- Paul Benedict as Orren Brooks
- William Traylor as Ray Brandy
- Dennis Dugan as Logan
- George Wyner as Man at Party
- George Skaff as Dr. H. Malvert
- Joan Prather as Robin Gibson, Antelope Valley's Young American Miss
- Denise Nickerson as Shirley Tolstoy, San Diego's Young American Miss
- Melanie Griffith as Karen Love, Simi Valley's Young American Miss
- Annette O'Toole as Doria Houston, Anaheim's Young American Miss
- Maria O'Brien as Maria Gonzales, Salinas's Young American Miss
- Colleen Camp as Connie Thompson, Imperial Valley's Young American Miss
- Caroline Williams as Helga, Vacaville's Young American Miss
- Kate Sarchet as Judy Wagner, Modesto's Young American Miss
- Shawn Christianson as Fountain Valley's Young American Miss/The Winner
- Terry McGovern as Judge

== Themes ==
Film scholar Jonathan Kirshner notes that, while Smile "takes some easy shots at the superficial culture of teen beauty pageants," it is more concerned with the character of Big Bob Freelander (Bruce Dern), who functions as "a metaphor for America, whose boyish optimism and can-do spirit are beginning to fray as he stalls in middle age... It is a film about the emerging dissatisfactions of its characters." Film historian Ken Dancyger notes that, in Smile, "no target goes untouched... In the final scene, the real victims, the contestants who are being sexually exploited, become, in the next scene, the target of Ritchie's commentary on these beauty contests."

== Production ==
=== Development ===
The film marked the third and final entry in director Michael Ritchie's "American Dream Trilogy", three films focusing on the theme of competition, which include Downhill Racer (1969) and The Candidate (1972). Ritchie developed the idea for the film after having served as a judge for a real beauty pageant in Santa Rosa, California, and based many of the incidents depicted in the film on events he had witnessed himself.

=== Filming ===
Principal photography took place in and around Santa Rosa, California, with the pageant held at Veteran's Memorial Auditorium.

Melanie Griffith, Denise Nickerson, Annette O'Toole, and Colleen Camp appeared in early roles in their respective careers as pageant contestants.

== Release ==
The film premiered at the USA Film Festival in Dallas, Texas on March 20, 1975. Its Los Angeles premiere followed on July 9, 1975, and it was entered into the New York Film Festival in October 1975.

=== Commercial performance ===
According to director Ritchie, the film was only seen by approximately "92,000 paying customers" by the end of its brief theatrical release, which he attributed to the distributor, United Artists, losing faith in the film and shortening its theatrical run. He also felt that the studio had misrepresented the film too heavily as a satire, as well as marketing it as a salacious examination of beauty pageant culture, which alienated audiences in smaller regional markets.

=== Critical response ===
Smile was well received upon release, with praise for the humor, satire and performances. Vincent Canby of The New York Times called the film a "pungent surprise, a rollicking satire that misses few of the obvious targets, but without dehumanizing the victims. It's an especially American kind of social comedy in the way that great good humor sometimes is used to reveal unpleasant facts instead of burying them." Roger Ebert of the Chicago Sun-Times gave the film 3 out of 4 stars, saying that though "Ritchie has so many targets that he misses some and never quite gets back to others," the film still "does a good job of working over the hypocrisy and sexism of a typical beauty pageant." John Simon described the film as "funny, sobering, and strong". It was one of the few American films screened at the New York Film Festival that was admired by critic Pauline Kael.

In the years following its release, Smile went on to gain a cult following. In 2014, Indiewire listed Smile as one of the "ten great overlooked films from the 1970s." The Playlist said the film was "overlooked even within Ritchie’s canon: a gentle, occasionally caustic but mostly warm satire." The site called the performances "uniformly top-notch," and said "Subsequent beauty-pageant movies like Drop Dead Gorgeous and Little Miss Sunshine have tended to feel like pale imitations next to it."

On Rotten Tomatoes, the film has an approval rating of 100% based on reviews from 18 critics. Metacritic, which uses a weighted average, assigned the film a score of 79 out of 100, based on 11 critics, indicating "generally favorable" reviews.

=== Home media ===
MGM Home Entertainment first released Smile on DVD on August 24, 2004. The independent film distributor Fun City Editions released the film on Blu-ray on April 27, 2021.

== Stage musical adaptation ==
The film was adapted into a Broadway musical in 1986 by Marvin Hamlisch and Howard Ashman.

== See also ==
- List of American films of 1975
- Drop Dead Gorgeous, another satirical film about a beauty pageant.
- The Great American Beauty Contest

== Sources ==
- Dancyger, Ken (2013). Global Scriptwriting. Burlington, Massachusetts: Focal Press. ISBN 978-1-136-04810-4.
- Kellow, Brian (2012). Pauline Kael: A Life in the Dark. New York City, New York: Penguin. ISBN 978-0-143-12220-3.
- Kirshner, Jonathan (2012). Hollywood's Last Golden Age: Politics, Society, and the Seventies Film in America. Ithaca, New York: Cornell University Press. ISBN 978-0-801-46540-6.
- Simon, John (1982). Reverse Angle: A Decade of American Film. New York City, New York: Crown Publishers Inc. ISBN 978-0-517-54471-6.
