= WFAA =

Television station in Dallas

- Dallas–Fort Worth, Texas; United States
- City: Dallas, Texas
- Channels: Digital: 8 (VHF); Virtual: 8
- Branding: WFAA 8

Programming
- Affiliations: 8.1: ABC; for others, see § Subchannels

Ownership
- Owner: Tegna Inc., a subsidiary of Nexstar Media Group; (WFAA-TV, Inc.)
- Sister stations: KFAA-TV; Nexstar: KDAF

History
- First air date: September 17, 1949
- Former call signs: KBTV (1949–1950); WFAA-TV (1950–2009)
- Former channel numbers: Analog: 8 (VHF, 1949–2009); Digital: 9 (VHF, 1998–2009)
- Former affiliations: DuMont (primary 1949–1950, secondary 1950–1955); Paramount (secondary, 1949); NBC (1950–1957); ABC (secondary, 1950–1957)
- Call sign meaning: "Working For All Alike"

Technical information
- Licensing authority: FCC
- Facility ID: 72054
- ERP: 45.6 kW
- HAAT: 510 m (1,673 ft)
- Transmitter coordinates: 32°35′7.20″N 96°58′42.10″W
- Repeater: KFAA-TV 8.8 (30.3 UHF) Decatur

Links
- Public license information: Public file; LMS
- Website: www.wfaa.com

WFAA (channel 8) is a television station licensed to Dallas, Texas, United States, serving as the ABC affiliate for the Dallas–Fort Worth metroplex. It is owned by the Tegna subsidiary of Nexstar Media Group alongside independent station KFAA-TV (channel 29), which provides a full-market high definition simulcast of WFAA's main channel on its UHF physical channel assigned to channel 8.8, due to long-term issues involving WFAA's digital VHF signal. Nexstar also owns CW outlet KDAF (channel 33).

WFAA and KFAA-TV share studio facilities and business offices at the WFAA Communications Center Studios on Young Street in downtown Dallas (next to the offices of WFAA's former sister newspaper under the ownership of former parent company Belo, The Dallas Morning News). WFAA's transmitter is located in Cedar Hill, Texas.

WFAA is the largest ABC affiliate by market size that is not owned and operated by the network through its ABC Owned Television Stations division. This also makes Dallas the largest media market with a "Big Four" station (ABC, NBC, CBS, Fox) that is not owned by that respective network. It is also the only station among the Big Four in the Dallas–Fort Worth market that is not network-owned and operated.

== History ==
=== Early history ===
The initial application for the television station was filed on October 23, 1944, when local businessman Karl Hoblitzelle, owner of movie theater chain Interstate Circuit Theatres, applied with the Federal Communications Commission (FCC) to obtain a construction permit and license to operate a television station on VHF channel 8; it was the first such license application for a television station in the Southern United States. Hoblitzelle planned to operate the station out of the Republic Bank building in downtown Dallas, and even conducted a closed-circuit television broadcast of the opening of one of his properties, the Wilshire Theatre. Texas oil magnate Tom Potter filed a separate application for the channel 8 license and was ultimately awarded the permit over Hoblitzelle.

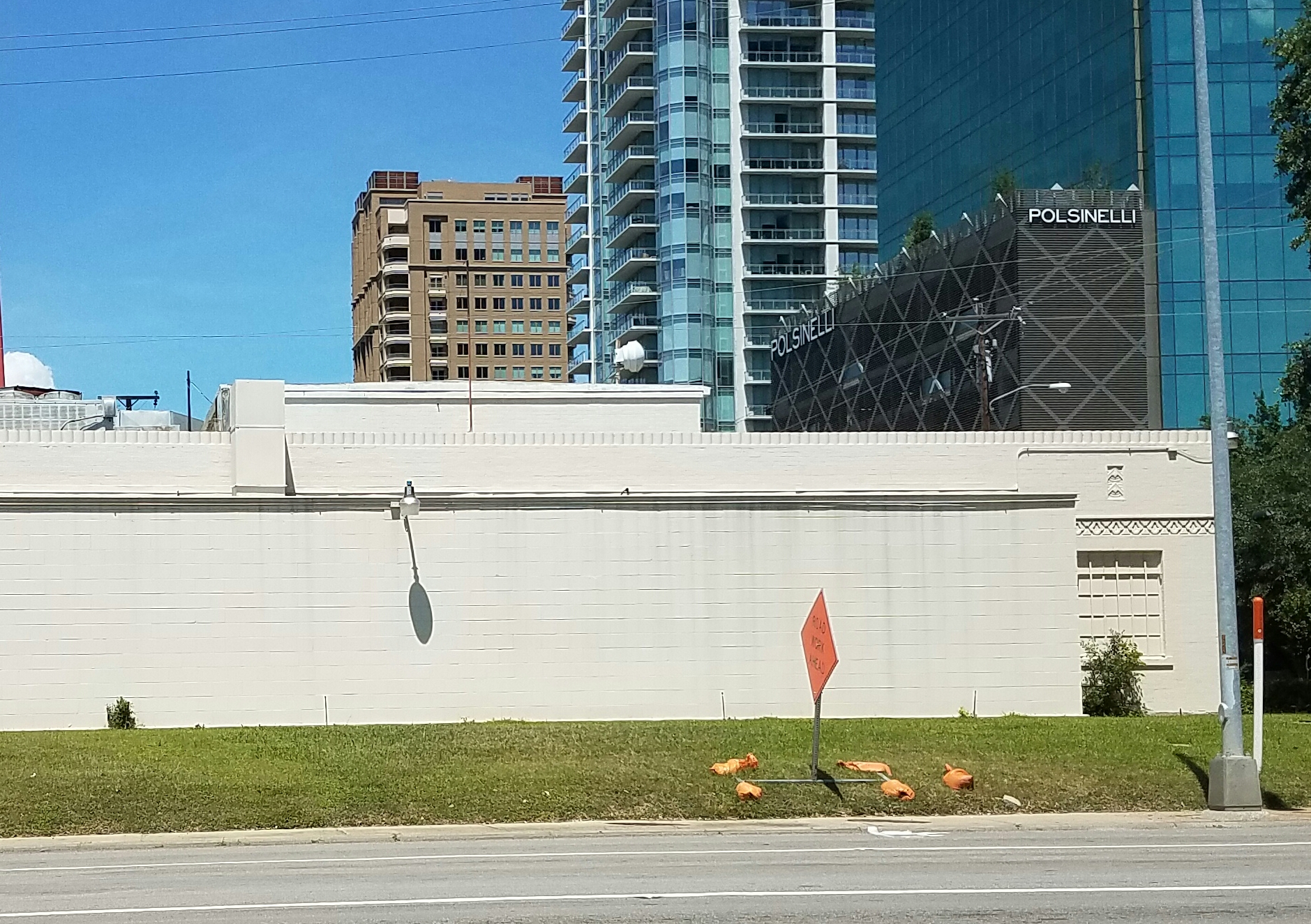
Site originally used by KBTV (later WFAA) for studios and offices, located just north of downtown Dallas (this building now houses the operations of PBS member station KERA-TV, and its sister public radio stations KERA and KKXT).

The station first signed on the air at 8 p.m. on September 17, 1949, as KBTV, with a fifteen-minute ceremony inaugurating the launch of channel 8 as its first broadcast; KBTV broadcast for one hour that evening, with the remainder of its initial schedule consisting of its first locally produced program, the variety series Dallas in Wonderland. Vice President Alben W. Barkley cut the ribbon to officially launch the station in front of a crowd of 5,000. Potter founded and operated the station through the Lacy-Potter TV Broadcasting Company, which he partially controlled. It was the third television station to sign on in Texas (behind WBAP-TV (channel 5, now KXAS-TV) in nearby Fort Worth, which signed on almost one year earlier on September 29, 1948; and KLEE-TV in Houston, which debuted on January 1, 1949), the second station in the Dallas–Fort Worth metroplex, and the first to be licensed to Dallas. The station originally operated from studio facilities located at Harry Hines Boulevard and Wolf Street, north of downtown Dallas.

When the station commenced its full schedule on September 18, KBTV had broadcast only four hours of programming per day. It originally operated as a primary affiliate of the DuMont Television Network and a secondary affiliate of the short-lived Paramount Television Network; under the arrangement, through an agreement between Lacy-Potter and Paramount Pictures, the station agreed to air 4.75 hours of Paramount Television's programming each week during 1949. KBTV, NBC affiliate WBAP-TV and CBS affiliate KRLD-TV (channel 4, now Fox owned-and-operated station KDFW)—the latter of which was also licensed to Dallas and signed on three months later on December 3—would be the only television stations in the Dallas–Fort Worth area to sign on for the next six years as the FCC had instituted a freeze on new applications for television station licenses in November 1948, a moratorium that would last for four years.

=== Belo ownership and ABC affiliation ===
Lacy-Potter Television Broadcasting lost $128,020 in net revenue during its four-month stewardship of KBTV, leading Tom Potter to make the decision to put the station up for sale. The A.H. Belo Corporation, owner of The Dallas Morning News, had attempted to launch a new television station in Dallas two years earlier, when it applied for a construction permit to build transmitter and broadcasting facilities for a proposed station that would have transmitted on VHF channel 12. The FCC rejected Belo's application and, following the issuance of the Sixth Report and Order that lifted the agency's freeze on new television station licensing applications in 1952, eventually chose to reassign the Channel 12 allocation to Waco (after the agency assigned that same channel to Ardmore, Oklahoma, where it would be licensed to KXII, the FCC would eventually move the VHF channel 12 allocation from Waco to Abilene, which became home to KTXS-TV). Complicating matters, the agency's moratorium on new license applications, which the FCC instituted to sort out the backlog of prospective applicants that already filed to build such operations, left Belo with the sole recourse of acquiring a television station that was already on the air if it wanted to own one in the Dallas–Fort Worth area.

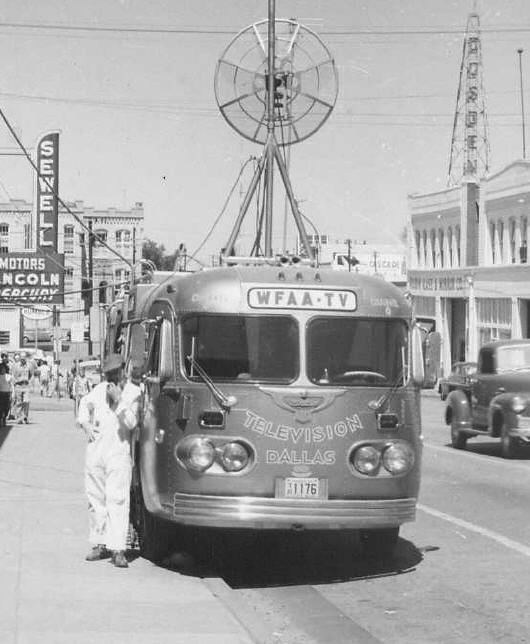
The WFAA Telecruiser in use during its affiliation with DuMont.

In January 1950, Belo purchased KBTV from Lacy-Potter for $575,000; the sale received FCC approval on March 13, 1950, with Belo formally assuming control of Channel 8 on March 17. The station was the first television property to be owned by the Dallas-based company, and also served as the flagship station of its broadcasting division until Belo merged with the Gannett Company in 2013. On May 21, Belo changed the station's call letters to WFAA-TV to match those of its new radio partner WFAA (570 AM, now KLIF). The WFAA calls reportedly stood for "Working For All Alike", although the radio station later billed itself as the "World's Finest Air Attraction". WFAA is one of a relatively limited number of broadcast television stations located west of the Mississippi River whose call letters begin with a "W"; the FCC normally assigns call signs prefixed with a "K" to television and radio stations with cities of license located west of the river and broadcast call signs prefixed with a "W" to stations located east of the river. The anomaly in the case of the WFAA television and radio stations is due to the fact the policy predates the launch of the radio station, as Dallas was originally located east of the original "K"/"W" border distinction defined by the FCC.

In 1950, WFAA switched its primary affiliation to NBC, and also affiliated with ABC on a secondary basis. DuMont shut down in 1955, amid various issues that arose from its relations with Paramount that hamstrung it from expansion. Although it had been apparent from the start that Dallas and Fort Worth (which Arbitron originally designated as separate media markets) were going to be collapsed into a single television market due to their close proximity, Fort Worth Star-Telegram owner Amon G. Carter—who founded WBAP-TV through his company, Carter Publications—did not care whether residents in Dallas could view that station; WFAA affiliated with NBC under a time share arrangement with WBAP-TV to expand coverage of the network's programming to areas of central and eastern Dallas County that only received rimshot coverage of the channel 5 signal.

After ownership of Carter Publications transferred to his familial heirs after Carter suffered a fatal heart attack two years before, in early 1957, NBC threatened to strip WBAP-TV of its affiliation if it did not agree to move its transmitter eastward to reach the entire Dallas area. Belo had attempted to get an exclusive NBC affiliation first, and approached the network with an offer to make WFAA its exclusive affiliate for the entire market. The network also approached the Roosevelt family-owned Texas State Network about affiliating with independent station KFJZ-TV (channel 11, now CBS owned-and-operated station KTVT), which had earlier moved its transmitter to the antenna farm in Cedar Hill. Carter's heirs—who initially did not want to move the transmitter closer to Dallas, in their aim to continue Carter's legacy of civic boosterism for Fort Worth—eventually agreed to NBC's demands that it move WBAP-TV's transmitter facilities to Cedar Hill, installing a transmitter antenna on a 1,500-foot (457 m) candelabra tower that was already shared by WFAA and KRLD-TV, and operate it at a higher effective radiated power strong enough to adequately cover Dallas. WFAA lost its NBC affiliation on September 1, 1957, as the network had awarded WBAP-TV the exclusive affiliation for the Dallas–Fort Worth market as a byproduct of the transmitter relocation and signal boost; this left channel 8 as an exclusive affiliate of the then-low-rated ABC.

Channel 8 became known for its heavy schedule of local programs during the period from the 1950s through the 1980s. The most popular was a show aimed at younger audiences; Jerry Haynes hosted a local children's program on the station on-and-off from 1961 to 1996. Originally debuting in March 1961 as Mr. Peppermint, Haynes (who donned a red- and white-striped jacket and straw hat in his portrayal of the titular character, accompanied by a candy-striped cane) starred alongside a variety of puppet characters (performed by Vern Dailey) and presented various segments from educational content to cartoon shorts; five years after ending its original nine-year run on WFAA in 1970, the program was revived as the half-hour magazine-style educational series Peppermint Place in 1975, running for 21 additional years—expanding into syndication for its final seven—until the program ended its collective 30-year run in July 1996. Other notable WFAA local productions included the music series The Group And Chapman and its progenitor Sump'n Else (both of which were hosted by Ralph Baker Jr. and Ron Chapman), Dallas Bandstand (also hosted by Haynes), lifestyle and fashion talk program The Julie Bennell Show (hosted by Dallas Morning News food editor Julie Bennell), the viewer Q&A series Let Me Speak to the Manager (originally titled Ask the Manager and later named Inside Television for the final four years of its run, co-hosted by Belo vice president Myron "Mike" Shapiro), and local versions of the Dialing for Dollars and PM Magazine franchises. Channel 8 also served as the original Dallas–Fort Worth home of the magazine series Texas Country Reporter, after host Bob Phillips, who originated it on KDFW in September 1972 as the locally produced 4 Country Reporter, sold the series into regional syndication (airing on WFAA under the title 8 Country Reporter) in 1986.

In 1958, WFAA became the first television station in the market to use a videotape recorder for broadcasting purposes; the station would gradually shift much of its locally produced programming from a live to a pre-recorded format, outside of newscasts, sports and special events, and eventually became one of the first television stations in the U.S. to convert its news footage to videotape in the 1970s. During the 1958–59 television season, WFAA served as the taping location for Jack Wyatt's ABC true crime reality series, Confession, in which assorted criminals explained why they chose to reject the mores of society and turn to crime.

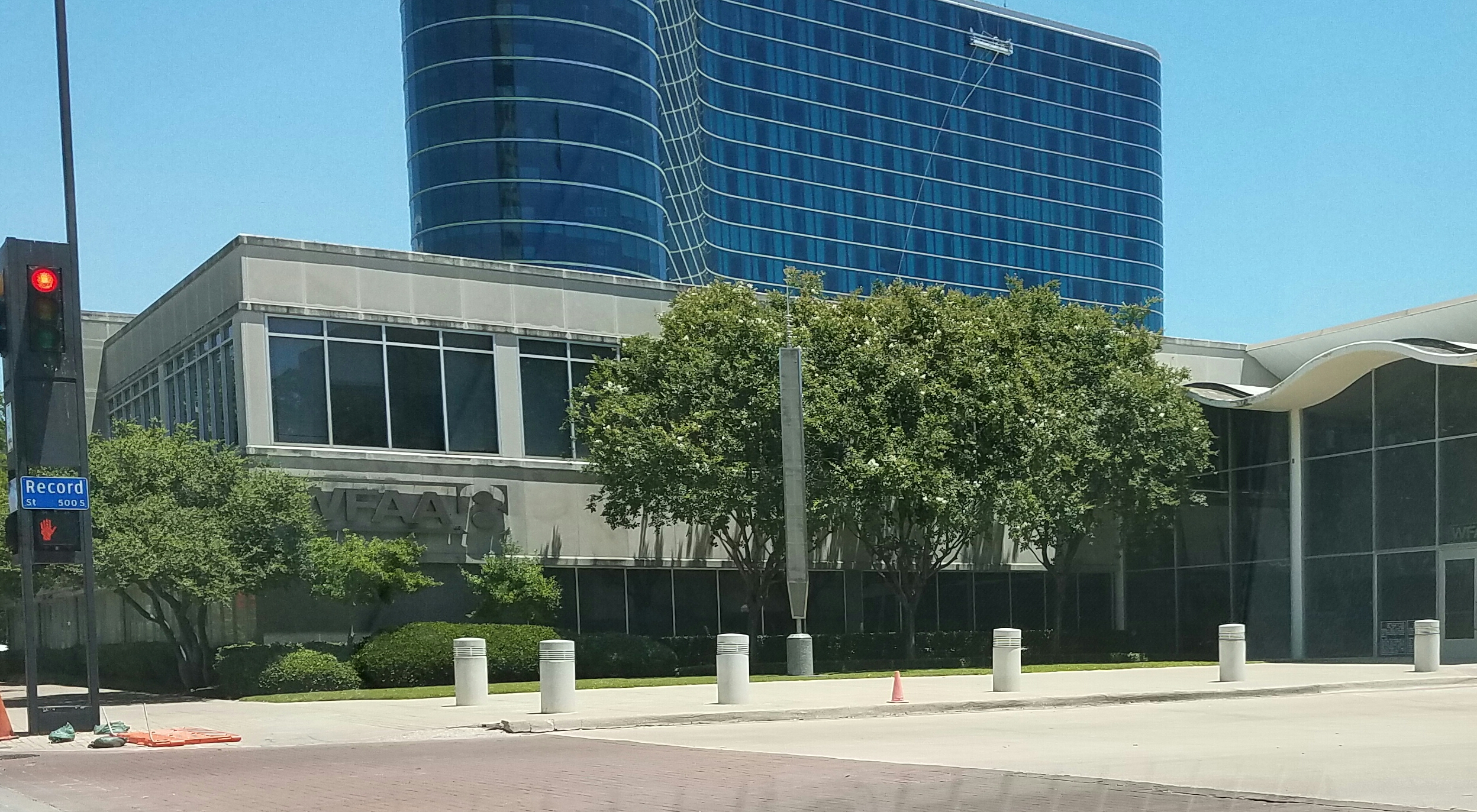
Studios and offices for WFAA in downtown Dallas. The first image of the building was from sometime in the 1960s, while the second (with added second floor) is as of 2018.

On April 2, 1961, the station's operations were relocated to the WFAA Communications Center Studios, a state-of-the-art broadcasting complex located at Young and Record Streets in downtown Dallas; the former studio facilities on Harry Hines Boulevard were subsequently purchased by North Texas Public Broadcasting for use as the broadcasting facilities for National Educational Television station KERA-TV (channel 13, now a PBS member station). The Communications Center complex housed three production studios, offices and sound recording studios for the WFAA radio stations as well as The Dallas Morning News' headquarters. The first live telecast to originate from the building was Young America Speaks, a 13-week intercollegiate debate tournament series (the first such program ever televised), which aired until June of that year. In 1974, Texas State Sen. Jim Wade filed a motion to the FCC, challenging Belo's renewal application for the Channel 8 license and strip it of rights to operate WFAA; Wade's efforts, in which he also attempted to convince the FCC to award the television station's license to him, would prove unsuccessful as the agency chose to approve renewal of the existing license owned by Belo.

Over time, Belo gradually expanded its television broadcasting unit. The company acquired its second television station in 1969, when it purchased KFDM-TV in Beaumont from Beaumont Broadcasting, later followed in 1980 by its purchase of WTVC in Chattanooga, Tennessee. Among its purchases in later years, Belo acquired the Corinthian Broadcasting subsidiary of Dun & Bradstreet in December 1983, adding six additional stations—including CBS affiliate KHOU in Houston—to its portfolio (forcing the respective sales of KFDM and WTVC to Freedom Communications, and of WISH-TV in Indianapolis and WANE-TV in Fort Wayne, Indiana, to LIN Broadcasting, to comply with FCC ownership limits); and added ten additional stations through its 1997 merger acquisition of the Providence Journal Company. By 1999, when it purchased ABC affiliate KVUE in Austin from the Gannett Company, Belo owned television stations in Texas' four largest television markets (WFAA, KHOU, KVUE and CBS affiliate KENS in San Antonio).

In May 1984, WFAA unveiled one of the most successful station image campaigns in the United States with the launch of the "Spirit of Texas", which was created in commemoration of the forthcoming 1986 sesquicentennial of Texas' independence. The promotions that aired as part of the campaign focused on the region's cultural heritage, accompanied by an imaging theme written by James R. Kirk of TM Productions, who composed it as part of an associated music package that was used for the station's newscasts until 1991.

On January 14, 1987, the Hill Tower transmitter facility in Cedar Hill (which was jointly owned by WFAA and KDFW) was struck by a Navy F-4 Phantom as it was performing training exercises while on approach to the Dallas Naval Air Station. The jet clipped several guy-wires; however, its two occupants had ejected themselves from the aircraft and parachuted to the ground before it crashed. The tower consortium between the two stations decided to have a new 1,400-foot-tall (430 m) tower constructed a 1/4 mile (0.40 km) southwest of the original facility, which was completed in 1989. The candelabra mast that encompassed the upper 281 feet (86 m) of the former tower, meanwhile, was dismantled (reducing its height to 1,240 feet (378 m)), with new transmitters installed to serve as auxiliary facilities for WFAA, KDFW and radio stations KJMZ (100.3 FM, now KJKK), KMEZ (107.5 FM, now KMVK), KQZY (105.3 FM, now KRLD-FM), KKDA-FM (104.5) and KMGC (102.9 FM, now KDMX).

In April 1998, when KTEN (which had been affiliated with ABC on a part-time basis since its sign-on in 1956) disaffiliated from the network, WFAA began serving as a default ABC station for areas near and south of the Red River within the adjacent Sherman–Ada market—including Gainesville, and the southern Oklahoma cities of Ardmore, Durant and Hugo—through its existing availability on most cable providers in the region (KOCO-TV in Oklahoma City served as the primary default affiliate for the northern counties of the DMA in south-central Oklahoma). However, residents in extreme North Texas could view most ABC programs that were preempted by KTEN via WFAA for several years beforehand, particularly after the former switched to a primary NBC affiliation in 1986 (steadily reducing ABC-provided content on its schedule to select daytime and prime time programs by 1994, when it added an additional primary affiliation with Fox). The market would regain an ABC station of its own when KTEN launched a digital subchannel affiliated with the network on May 1, 2010. Despite this, WFAA remains available on some cable providers in the southern half of the market; Cable One, however, removed the station from its Sherman and Denison systems on February 26, 2015, due to a clause in its retransmission agreement with KTEN that precluded it from carrying any other ABC stations from nearby markets.

On January 1, 1999, Belo launched Texas Cable News (TXCN), a statewide cable news channel that initially featured rolling news, weather and sports content, as well as public affairs, sports-talk and entertainment news programs, using staff and resources from WFAA and sister stations KVUE, KHOU and KENS, and The Dallas Morning News. TXCN switched to a format primarily consisting of repackaged newscasts featuring segments seen on each of Belo's Texas-based stations, and in-house weather segments on January 1, 2005, citing limited cable distribution in Texas' largest television markets for the format change that resulted in the layoffs of 45 of the channel's employees. Following its acquisition of Belo, Gannett shut down Texas Cable News on May 1, 2015.

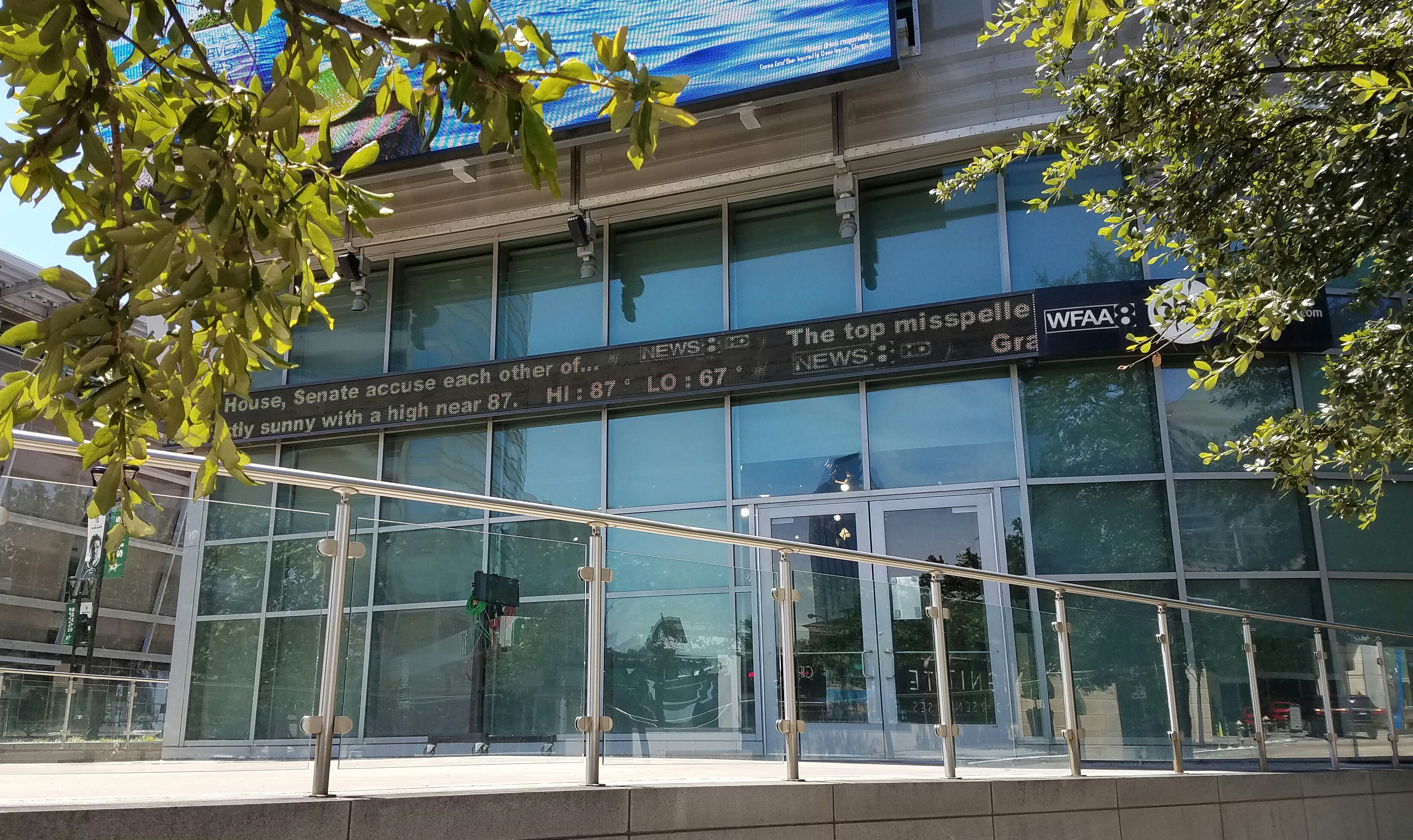
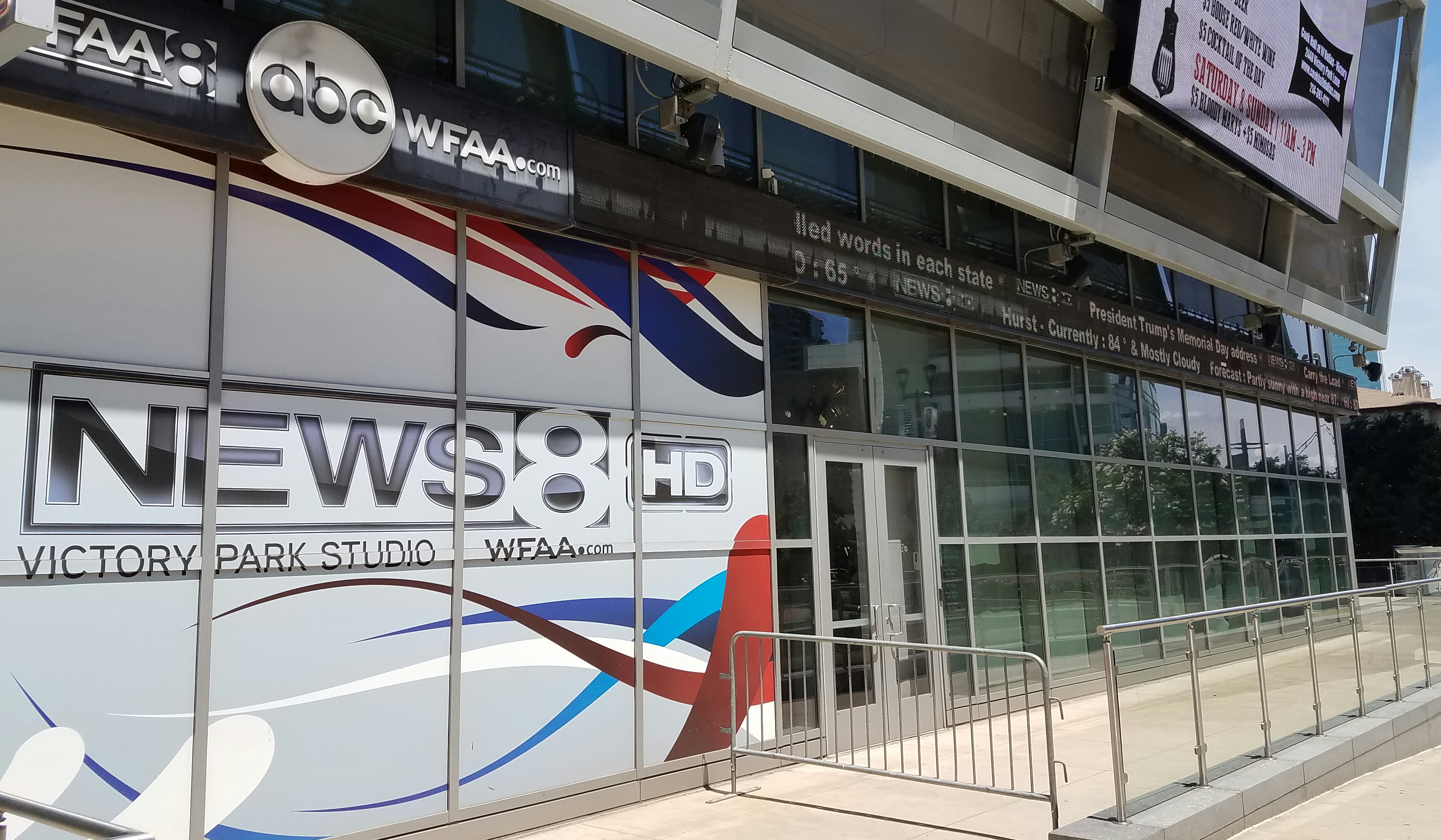
Alternate studios used by WFAA at Victory Park, just northwest of downtown Dallas (street-side view, left; plaza side view, right)

On July 20, 2005, Belo announced that it had reached an agreement with real estate developer Hillwood Capital to build a secondary studio facility in the eastern tower of the Plaza Towers complex then under construction in the Victory Park development at the corner of Olive and Houston Streets (adjacent to the American Airlines Center). The 5,000-square-foot (465 m^{2}) facility, which opened in January 2007, incorporates a street-level studio where most of the station's news programming (with the exception of the 10 p.m. newscast) and the local talk show Good Morning Texas is produced, and houses news production staff and engineering operations; initially, the building also housed certain operations run by Belo's other Dallas-based properties, including its publishing division. The WFAA Communications Center continues to house the station's newsroom and most other business operations (including its master control, traffic, advertising and programming departments).

On October 1, 2007, Belo announced plans to split off its broadcasting and newspaper interests into two independent companies. WFAA would remain with the broadcasting entity, which retained the Belo Corporation name and was structured as the legal successor to the previous company, while the newspaper division (which in addition to The Dallas Morning News, included among other publications Al Día, Neighborsgo and Quick) was spun off into the similarly named, shareholder-held entity A. H. Belo Corporation (the name used by the original company from 1865 to 2001). The split—which was completed on February 8, 2008—ended the joint ownership of WFAA television and The News after 59 years, becoming the last of the three newspaper/television broadcasting combinations in the Dallas–Fort Worth market to be separated into different companies (KXAS-TV was co-owned with the Star-Telegram from September 1948 until Carter Publications sold the former two properties and radio stations WBAP (820 AM) and KSCS (96.3 FM) to separate companies in 1974, while KDFW was co-owned with the Dallas Times-Herald—which ended publication after Belo acquired the newspaper in December 1991—from December 1949 until the Times Mirror Company sold the latter to the MediaNews Group in 1986). However, WFAA and The News continued to maintain a news content partnership through the end of 2013, at which time the newspaper entered into a collaborative agreement with KXAS-TV.

=== Gannett/Tegna ownership ===
On June 13, 2013, the Gannett Company announced that it would acquire Belo for $1.5 billion (the purchase price would increase to $2.2 billion by the merger's completion). The deal was granted FCC approval on December 20, and was finalized on December 23. Through the merger with Gannett, WFAA became the company's largest television station by market size (supplanting CBS-affiliated sister station WUSA in Washington, D.C., which has been owned by the company since 1986); it also marked channel 8's first ownership change in 63 years. This also marked Gannett's reentry in the Dallas–Fort Worth market since its ownership of radio station KOAI/KHKS (106.1) from 1989 to 1997. Additionally in July 2014, WFAA gained new sister stations in nearby markets—including NBC affiliate KCEN-TV in Waco and its Bryan semi-satellite KAGS-LD, CBS affiliate KYTX in Tyler and Fox affiliates KXVA in Abilene and KIDY in San Angelo—through Gannett's purchase of six television stations owned by the Dallas-based London Broadcasting Company, which based its portfolio of broadcasting properties exclusively within Texas (independent station KTXD-TV (channel 47) in nearby Greenville was one of two stations that London exempted from the deal, along with then-MeTV affiliate KCEB in Tyler, although FCC ownership regulations did not play a factor in the case of KTXD and WFAA as the Dallas–Fort Worth market had enough full-power television stations to allow a fourth duopoly).

On August 5, 2014, Gannett announced that it would split its broadcast and print media properties into separate publicly traded companies. Once the corporate separation was finalized on June 29, 2015, WFAA became part of Tegna, which was structured as the legal successor of the old Gannett and assumed ownership of the original company's non-publishing assets (including the broadcasting unit and most of its digital media properties); the Gannett Company, meanwhile, was re-established as a new company absolved of all existing debt that retained its predecessor's newspapers (including the company's flagship publication, USA Today) and select digital assets not acquired by Tegna.

On September 25, 2020, WFAA would gain a sister station when Tegna acquired KMPX (channel 29, now KFAA-TV) from Estrella Media which airs its Estrella TV network over that station. The sale was completed on November 20 with KMPX moving most of its internal operations days later into WFAA's Communications Center Studios on Young Street. While KMPX retained its Estrella TV affiliation, the signal is used to provide a full-market high definition simulcast of WFAA's main channel (which remains on VHF channel 8) for those who only have a UHF antenna. The deal also includes a five-year affiliation agreement between Estrella and Tegna, as well as an option for Estrella to purchase WFAA's VHF license.

If the five-year agreement to sell the station to Estrella is carried out in full, Estrella would purchase the license and transmitter assets of WFAA, and the two stations would swap physical channels, with WFAA then taking KMPX's FCC facility ID and in technicality, KMPX moving to the channel 8 facility ID established in 1949.

=== Aborted sale to Cox Media Group ===
On February 22, 2022, Tegna announced that it would be acquired by Standard General and Apollo Global Management for $5.4 billion. As a part of the deal, WFAA and KMPX, along with their Austin sister station KVUE and Houston sister stations KHOU and KTBU would be resold to Cox Media Group. The sale was cancelled on May 22, 2023.

=== Nexstar ownership ===
Nexstar Media Group, the Irving-based owner of KDAF (channel 33), acquired Tegna in a deal announced in August 2025 and completed on March 19, 2026. A temporary restraining order issued one week later by the U.S. District Court for the Eastern District of California, later escalated to a preliminary injunction, has prevented KDAF from being integrated into WFAA and KFAA.

== Radio ==
=== WFAA (AM) ===
WFAA, which would eventually serve as the sister radio station to WFAA television, first signed on the air on June 26, 1922. The station had long participated in a time-sharing arrangement with Fort Worth radio station WBAP, which was maintained as the latter operated at various frequencies; it originally began in 1922, when WBAP (which first went on the air on May 2 of that year, nine weeks before WFAA began operations) transmitted at 630 kHz and continued until 1927, before resuming when that station moved to 800 kHz in 1929 and settling when WBAP moved its current frequency at 820 kHz in 1941. In 1947, WFAA and WBAP began time-sharing on a second frequency, 570 kHz, which was formerly occupied by KGKO. Until WFAA (AM) began to transmit full-time on 570 kHz in 1970, WBAP and WFAA were engaged in the somewhat bizarre situation of having to switch back and forth between the 570 and 820 frequencies at various times of the day: WBAP broadcast on 820 AM from midnight to 6 a.m., with WFAA taking over the frequency space until noon; WBAP returned to the 820 signal for a few hours, before WFAA once again took over the frequency. WFAA had control over 820 during prime evening hours, when the 50,000-watt clear channel signal could often be heard as far west as California and as far east as New York (at the time, there were significantly fewer radio stations that were operating at night, reducing the likelihood of interference).

WFAA was the first radio station in Texas to join a national network (becoming an affiliate of the NBC Red Network in 1927, four years after it agreed to join the network), co-founded the Texas Quality Network, and was the first Texas station to carry educational programs, to produce a serious radio drama series, to air a state championship football game and the first to broadcast an inaugural ceremony (that of Texas Governor Ross Sterling in 1931). The station's original on-air staff members and reporters consisted of columnists and editors employed with The Dallas Morning News. WFAA (AM) was home to the long-running morning program, The Early Birds, hosted by John Allen (and which was one of the early appearances by Dale Evans, who would later go on to star in several western films with actor husband Roy Rogers); as well as programs such as the gospel music series Hymns We Love, hosted by Norvell Slater; music programs Saturday Night Shindig, The Big D Jamboree and Slo-and-Ezy; the agricultural news program Murray Cox RFD; and later, 57 Nostalgia Place. Many of the early Dallas television pioneers began their careers at WFAA radio, including Ed Hogan, one of the most well-known personalities in Dallas during the early years of television. After maintaining an entertainment/variety format for many years, the station became a middle of the road (MOR) music station in 1970, before switching to a Top 40 format in 1973. On November 9, 1976, the station made its final format change, adopting a news and talk-based schedule (as "Newstalk 570").

WFAA (AM) was initially based its operations in a 9×9-ft tent on the roof of the Dallas Morning News' headquarters, before relocating to the newspaper's library. On October 1, 1925, it later moved to the 17th floor of the Baker Hotel at the southeast corner of Commerce and Akard Streets in downtown Dallas (which would be demolished in 1980), and then moved to facilities atop the Santa Fe Railroad Warehouse on Jackson Street on June 20, 1941 (the building still has the "WFAA" calls clearly painted along a panel on the top floor). On April 4, 1961, it moved to the WFAA Communications Center at Young and Record Streets. On July 2, 1983, its call letters were changed to KRQX.

=== WFAA-FM ===
WFAA-FM signed on October 5, 1946, as KERA-FM (no relation to the current radio and television station using those call letters). It was the first FM radio station to sign on in Texas, although its roots can be traced back to two test stations that signed on years prior: an experimental trial that dated back to 1939, and experimental FM station W5X1C, which signed on October 15, 1945. By 1947, WFAA-FM had moved from its original frequency at 94.3 FM to a preferred location at 97.9. With FM broadcasting in its infancy, the station signed on and off the air for months—and even going silent for two years—at a time, before settling on a permanent broadcast schedule by 1965.

Initially acting as a simulcast of the AM station, WFAA-FM programmed a MOR and beautiful music format until 1973, when it changed to album oriented rock (AOR) under the call letters KZEW-FM (branded as "The Zoo") on September 16, 1973. The station's concept and programming were initially under the direction of Ira Lipson, who brought in talent such as John LaBella and John Rody ("LaBella and Rody"), George Gimarc, Charley Jones, Dave Lee Austin, John B. Wells, Doc Morgan, Nancy Johnson, John Dew, John Dillon and Tempie Lindsey (Wells and Morgan would later serve as the respective primary and secondary announcers for WFAA television from the 1980s to the early 2000s; Wells primarily did news promos, while Morgan primarily did programming promos). The FM station shared facilities with WFAA-AM on the second floor of the Communications Center building. Belo sold both KRQX and KZEW-FM on January 1, 1987; the FM station has since changed its calls to KBFB and maintains an urban contemporary format.

== Subchannel history ==
=== WFAA-DT2 ===
WFAA-DT2 is the second digital subchannel of WFAA, broadcasting in-house weather and local programming in widescreen standard definition on channel 8.2.

WFAA launched a digital subchannel on virtual channel 8.2 in 2004, as a locally programmed format under the name "Xpress 8.2". The service, which was later renamed "News 8 Now" (which the station also used as the branding for promotional content and as an alternative program-specific title for the station's newscasts starting in 1996), featured weather radar imagery, regular news updates and occasional live programming (including content from ABC News Now), as well as a ticker that displayed local and national headlines. The subchannel was also used to air special programming; in particular, WFAA-DT2 was used to relay wall-to-wall coverage from its sister stations during hurricane season from New Orleans sister station WWL-TV for Hurricane Katrina in August 2005 and Hurricane Gustav in 2008; and Houston sister station KHOU for Hurricane Ike in 2008 and Hurricane Harvey in 2017. In addition to the weather radar feed, it also carried an audio simulcast of local NOAA Weather Radio station KEC56, with fellow NOAA stations KEC55 in Fort Worth and KXI87 in Corsicana used as alternate feeds. On April 30, 2011, the subchannel became an affiliate of The Local AccuWeather Channel. In rare instances, this channel space is used to air preempted ABC programming due to live sporting events such as Monday Night Football when the Dallas Cowboys are scheduled to play. On January 20, 2020, the subchannel ended its affiliation with The Local AccuWeather Channel (it was one of the last full-power stations still known to be carrying the channel), and began broadcasting in-house weather programming under the name "WFAA Two". The programming consists of local weather outlooks, local and regional radars, local and regional conditions, airport conditions, traffic conditions, various tower cams around Dallas–Fort Worth, and some advertisements. It continues to simulcast audio from NOAA Weather Radio, as well as instrumental music. In February, WFAA Two expanded its content to also include local programming; it planned to carry the home baseball games of Dallas Baptist University in 2020 before the COVID-19 pandemic canceled the college baseball season.

== Programming ==
=== Local programming ===
WFAA produces the talk, entertainment and lifestyle program Good Morning Texas, which airs weekdays at 9 a.m. and is produced independently of WFAA's news department; the hour-long program, which debuted on September 12, 1994, under original hosts Scott Sams and Deborah Duncan (as of June 2016, it is currently co-hosted by Erin Hunter and former KXAS-TV anchor Jane McGarry), served as the basis for other similarly formatted local late-morning talk shows that debuted on its sister stations under Belo ownership in subsequent years. Some of the topics that were shown on Good Morning Texas were also used during its morning newscasts known as News 8 Daybreak. In 2020 during the COVID-19 pandemic, an extension version of Good Morning Texas was added to the 2 p.m. schedule called Good Morning Texas Extra which contains the same content as their morning show, which replaced the Tegna-produced Sister Circle.

Channel 8 held the local syndication rights to the game shows Jeopardy! and Wheel of Fortune for several years starting in 1987. After spending eighteen years in the 6:30 p.m. slot, WFAA dropped Wheel, as well as Jeopardy! in the 3 p.m. slot, from its schedule in the fall of 2005. Both series moved to KTVT, with the former being replaced by Entertainment Tonight, which prior to the change, Channel 8 had aired following Nightline since it acquired the rights to ET from KDFW in September 1984.

WFAA carries the majority of the ABC network schedule; however, as an affiliate that is not owned by the network itself, WFAA may occasionally preempt some of the network's prime time shows to run locally produced specials. ABC programs that were preempted or otherwise interrupted by breaking news or severe weather coverage are tape delayed to air in overnight timeslots or in rare times, on WFAA's DT2 channel space; although station personnel gives viewers the option to watch the affected shows the following day on ABC's desktop and mobile streaming platforms or its cable/satellite video-on-demand service. WFAA currently airs This Week on a half-hour delay as the station produces and broadcasts Inside Texas Politics during the first 30 minutes of This Week's usual Central Time airing, and also airs the Saturday edition of Good Morning America one hour earlier than most ABC stations (airing it at 6 a.m. via the live Eastern Time Zone feed rather than on tape delay). It also carries the Litton's Weekend Adventure block on a one-hour delay from its "live feed" due to the Saturday edition of News 8 Daybreak, although midday college football games that ABC airs during the fall may subject programs normally aired on Saturdays in the 11 a.m. hour to be deferred to Sundays to fulfill educational programming obligations (during the 1990s, such deferrals were also caused by the local sports highlight program High School Football Roundup, which WFAA aired as a lead-in to ABC's college football telecasts).

=== Sports programming ===
In January 2024, WFAA parent company Tegna Inc. announced an agreement to air 10 Dallas Mavericks games during the 2023–24 NBA season. Later in September, Tegna announced a new deal with the Mavericks beginning with the 2024-25 NBA season after they terminated their contract with Bally Sports. The bulk of the games would go on sister station KFAA-TV with WFAA simulcasting 15 games. A similar arrangement with the WNBA's Dallas Wings also took shape in 2025. Both deals are in addition to any games selected for ABC's national NBA and WNBA coverage.

=== Past program preemptions and deferrals ===
Historically, the station has either preempted or aired out of pattern certain ABC network programs to make room for other local or syndicated programs or because of internal concerns over a program's content. Beginning in 1970, it was one of a handful of ABC stations that did not carry American Bandstand, opting to air public service programming instead. It also preempted Good Morning America for the first five months of its run from November 1975 to March 1976, in favor of the existing local morning program The AM Show (GMA's short-lived predecessor AM America was also not cleared throughout its run from January to November 1975). Because of its hour-long midday newscast—which aired at noon—WFAA has aired programming scheduled during that hour nationally on a day-behind basis at 11 a.m.: the soap opera All My Children aired in that slot until September 27, 2011, when it was replaced by The Chew. On September 10, 2018, WFAA moved its midday newscast to 11 a.m. to carry GMA Day (now GMA3: What You Need To Know) at noon. From the mid-1970s until that soap concluded in December 1984, WFAA aired The Edge of Night (which the network recommended be aired at 3 p.m.) on a day-behind basis prior to ABC's morning sitcom rerun block, to air feature films after General Hospital. Following the midday newscast's expansion into an hour-long broadcast in September 1992, WFAA aired Loving—which many ABC stations in the Central Time Zone normally aired at 12:30 p.m.—on a day-behind basis until the soap opera (which by that time, was reformatted as The City) was canceled in 1996; for similar reasons, it also carried Port Charles on Tuesday through Saturday early mornings throughout that soap's run from 1997 to 2004.

The station traditionally aired syndicated programs following its 10 p.m. newscast for many years, resulting in certain ABC late night programs that the network recommended its stations air immediately after their late local newscasts being delayed to accommodate them. From its debut in 1980 until September 1983, WFAA delayed Nightline in favor of late night movie presentations; the newsmagazine aired in its then-recommended 10:30 slot from September 1983 until September 1984, when it settled into a half-hour tape delayed airing after the station acquired the local syndication rights to Entertainment Tonight. As a byproduct of WFAA's swap of Nightline and ET's respective timeslots in September 1989 (placing the former back in its network "live" slot), Channel 8 aired Politically Incorrect with Bill Maher a half-hour later than its then-recommended 11:05 p.m. Central time slot from its ABC debut in January 1997 until its cancellation in July 2002; the talk show that replaced it, Jimmy Kimmel Live!, also aired in this manner starting with its January 2003 premiere (WFAA would begin airing Kimmel directly following Nightline, as intended by ABC, on September 12, 2011).

WFAA has traditionally run ABC's Saturday morning children's program lineup in its entirety; however, from September 1998 to September 2011, WFAA aired several programs within the block significantly out of pattern. The station usually aired the block continuously via the network's "live" feed from 7 a.m. to noon until September 1998, when WFAA separated the lineup (by then, known under the Disney's One Saturday Morning banner) into two blocks bookending the newly launched Saturday edition of News 8 Daybreak, with the first two hours being switched to a one-week delayed broadcast from 5 to 7 a.m. and the final three hours continuing to air off the "live" network feed from 9 a.m. to noon.

Following its September 2002 rebranding as ABC Kids, WFAA began timeshifting some programs featured on the block. Until ABC dropped the program on August 28, 2010, a double run of Mighty Morphin Power Rangers (both the iterations that aired on ABC and Toon Disney prior to the 2010 transfer of franchise rights from Disney to original distributor Saban Entertainment, as well as repeats of the show's first season that ABC aired during the 2009–10 season) aired on a one-week delay from 5 to 6 am, instead of the network's "live"-fed slot of 11 a.m. to noon. In addition, the ABC Kids programs that were recommended to air during the 8 a.m. hour (including later entries The Emperor's New School and The Replacements) aired instead on a three-hour delay during the 11 a.m. hour; WFAA aired the remaining two hours in pattern from the ABC off-air feed.

In the past, WFAA has also chosen to preempt certain ABC programs because of content deemed inappropriate by station management, in some cases due to concerns over possible FCC-imposed fines. Under the stewardship of general manager Mike Shapiro during the 1960s and 1970s, WFAA preempted certain theatrical and made-for-television films aired by ABC which management deemed too risque for broadcast. WFAA was the largest ABC affiliate to preempt NYPD Blue (which had its first two seasons air on independent station-turned-UPN affiliate KTXA instead) due to concerns over its violent content, and occasional strong profanity and partial nudity. Channel 8 substituted the police procedural in its Tuesday night timeslot with alternate programming, before launching Good Evening Texas—a weekly talk show serving as an extension of Good Morning Texas—in September 1994; WFAA began clearing NYPD Blue at the start of its third season in September 1995. It was also among the more than 20 ABC-affiliated stations that declined to air the network's telecast of Saving Private Ryan in November 2004, due to concerns over possible fines over the intense war violence and strong profanity in the film that ABC opted against editing out of the broadcast amid the FCC's crackdown on indecent material following the wardrobe malfunction incident that occurred during Justin Timberlake and Janet Jackson's Super Bowl XXXVIII halftime show performance that February. The station aired The Oprah Winfrey Show and the 1986 film Hoosiers in its place, although the FCC would eventually declare Saving Private Ryan's telecast as not being in violation of the agency's broadcast decency regulations after it aired.

=== News operation ===
As of September 2020, WFAA broadcasts 37 1/2 hours of locally produced newscasts each week (with 6 hours, 5 minutes each weekday; 3 hours, 35 minutes on Saturdays and 3 1/2 hours on Sundays). In addition, the station produces two Sunday evening sports programs: the highlight program Dale Hansen's Sports Special (hosted by longtime sports director Dale Hansen, who joined the station from KDFW in March 1983), and High School Sports Special (hosted by weekend sports anchor Joe Trahan and airing during the school year). WFAA also previously operated a news helicopter, HD Chopper 8 (formerly known as Telecopter 8), which featured the 1984–1996 dual-outlined "8" logo on its underside. The station maintains bureaus in Collin County at Riders Field, and in Tarrant County near downtown Fort Worth; both bureaus house a limited staff of reporters, but are rarely used for newscast production. WFAA is one of the few television stations that does not use the First Warning broadcast weather alert system; a text display of the warning type and the affected counties is instead shown at the top of the screen when severe weather alerts are in effect for the viewing area.

==== News department history ====
Channel 8 had been the ratings leader among the television newscasts in the Dallas–Fort Worth market for much of its history, having overtaken WBAP-TV/KXAS-TV in the position during the mid-1970s. WFAA's 10 p.m. newscast, known as The News 8 Update from 1980 to 2012, has typically placed as the market's most-watched late evening newscast, and its 5 and 6 p.m. newscasts are typically the area's most-watched early evening local newscasts. However, the station's ratings have suffered in recent years, particularly among adults between the ages of 25 and 54 due to competition from Fox owned-and-operated station KDFW as well as improving viewership since the late 2000s for CBS owned-and-operated station KTVT's newscasts; WFAA's 10 p.m. newscast slid from first place for the November 2010 sweeps to a relatively distant second during the February 2011 sweeps period with total viewers and with adults 25-54 (its first fall from first place in that slot as well as at 6 p.m. in total viewers for the first time in at least three decades). WFAA's only No. 1 finish during the latter period was at 5 p.m. in total viewers (it lost to KDFW in the adult 25-54 demographic), aided by its Oprah lead-in. The station was in last place overall in among adults 25 to 54 for the first time in at least 30 years. During the May 2011 sweeps period, the 10 p.m. news regained its position as the market's No. 1 late newscast in total viewers and adults 25–54; its morning newscast placed third in both demographics, while the 5 and 6 p.m. newscasts placed first in the early evening slot (aided by the outgoing Oprah) in total viewers and second (behind KDFW) in the 25- to 54-year-old demographic.

WFAA was the first station to break the news of President John F. Kennedy's assassination on November 22, 1963, which occurred about two blocks north of the station's studios near Dealey Plaza, outside the Texas School Book Depository (now known as the Dallas County Administration Building), and seriously injured then-Governor John Connally, who was riding in the motorcade carrying Kennedy. The station conducted the first live television interview with Abraham Zapruder, who shot the famous film of the assassination. During the course of the interview with Zapruder, who came to the Communications Center studio by police escort, WFAA announcer and program director Jay Watson (who reported on the shooting with Jerry Haynes, both of whom heard the gunshots being fired at Kennedy) intimated that the film was to be developed in the station's film lab; however, WFAA did not possess the ability to process the Kodachrome II 8 mm safety film from Zapruder's camera. WFAA and its live remote unit with reporter Ed Hogan fed much of the coverage of the assassination and its aftermath to ABC over the next four days. The shooting of accused assassin Lee Harvey Oswald by Jack Ruby in the basement of Dallas police headquarters, however, was not broadcast live (as it was on NBC) or on tape (as on CBS one minute later) by WFAA and ABC as the former's live newsgathering truck was positioned elsewhere at the time. ABC was therefore only able to show delayed newsreel footage of the historic event. WFAA had purchased a fully equipped, live broadcast studio truck prior to the assassination of Kennedy, but the truck was not rolled out for the parade through downtown Dallas. In the aftermath of the murder, the staff was told the cost would have been too great for the news department to compensate the production facility for its use.

As local television news evolved into a more polished presentation, WFAA became known for groundbreaking achievements and reporting in broadcast journalism as well as for many technological advancements including being the first to convert to a computerized newsroom; and the first station in the market to deploy a helicopter and live trucks for field newsgathering, to use microwave transmission for live broadcast and the use of satellite uplink trucks for broadcasts from around Texas and the nation. WFAA was the first U.S. television station to make use of international satellite capacity, broadcasting a live program (anchored by the late Murphy Martin) from Paris, France, in 1969, consisting of interviews with wives of American POWs in Vietnam. It was perhaps the first in the nation to broadcast videotaped field reports (film was used almost exclusively in local news until the late 1970s and early 1980s), televising the arrival of President Richard Nixon at Dallas Love Field within 30 minutes of his plane's touchdown in 1969 (a Sony reel-to-reel video recorder made for home use was pressed into service for this broadcast presented on a regular, midnight newscast). WFAA uncovered significant stories in the 1980s including information of academic improprieties that would lead to the Southern Methodist University football team being given the "death penalty" in the mid-1980s, as well as the first major media investigation into the America's Savings & Loan scandal that was rooted in Texas.

WFAA-TV began its rise to news dominance in Dallas–Fort Worth during the late 1960s and early 1970s under the leadership of news manager Travis Linn, who had previously served as news director for WFAA radio. Linn later became Dallas bureau chief for CBS News before becoming professor and dean of the journalism program at the University of Nevada–Reno. Under Linn, the station expanded its news programming to 4 1/2 hours per day, including an unprecedented one-hour program at 10 p.m. each weeknight as well as a 15-minute newscast at midnight four nights a week; the station also launched News 8 Etc., a 90-minute morning news-talk show that replaced the children's program Mr. Peppermint in January 1970 and was originally hosted by Suzie Humphreys and Don Harris, who conducted the broadcast without the assistance of cue cards or a TelePrompTer; following anchor Gene Thomas' death when a jet-powered dragster he was riding in for a story being produced for the show crashed at speeds of 286 miles per hour (460 km/h) at Dallas International Motor Speedway in October 1971, the program underwent several changes to its anchor team and was later retooled in May 1974 as The AM Show (later shortened to simply AM), before ending in January 1978.

Building its existing success, WFAA dominated the market's local news ratings from the mid-1970s—having overtaken WBAP-TV/KXAS' once-dominant The Texas News—through the late 1990s. The station strengthened its on-air news staff with top-tier talent, led by anchors including Tracy Rowlett (one of three reporters—along with Doug Fox and Byron Harris—whom news director Marty Haag brought over to WFAA from his previous job as news department head at KWTV in Oklahoma City in 1973), Iola Johnson (who became the first African American news anchor in Dallas in 1978, serving as a lead anchor with Rowlett), Bob Gooding, Murphy Martin, Judi Hanna, John Criswell, Chip Moody, John McCaa, Gloria Campos, Lisa McRee, Verne Lundquist, Dale Hansen and Troy Dungan (who, as chief weather anchor from 1976 to 2007, developed modern-day chroma key techniques for televised weather forecasts, the five-day forecast concept and created the "News 8 Doppler Net", a network of National Weather Service radar sites throughout Texas). Other notable people who once worked at Channel 8 include Scott Pelley (who was recently anchorman of the CBS Evening News), the late David Garcia (who went on to become a network reporter for ABC News), Mike Lee (who covered news in Europe for many years at ABC News' London bureau), Doug Terry (who became a founding reporter/producer at NPR's All Things Considered and created several Washington-based television news services), and the late Don Harris (who, while working for NBC News at the time, was killed at the start of the Jonestown massacre and mass suicides in Guyana in 1978).

Channel 8's approach to news during this period was characterized by an aggressive, all-out commitment to get the story and to present it in graphic, visual detail. The station was rewarded with some of the highest ratings of any local station in a major media market. A standard practice was to have each reporter cover only one beat, such as Dallas City Hall or the Dallas County Commission, making the reporter an expert on the subject that he or she was covering. Former news director H. Martin "Marty" Haag is credited with leading the station's news department to ratings dominance and national prominence, as well as convincing the Dallas Morning News ownership to allow much greater spending on news at WFAA than ever seen before, far surpassing the budgets of other local rival stations. Haag was honored with a special Lifetime Achievement George Foster Peabody Award shortly before his death in 2004. The station resumed a local morning newscast in 1987, when it launched the initially 60-minute traditional news program News 8 Daybreak (which evolved out of local news inserts that it aired during World News This Morning).

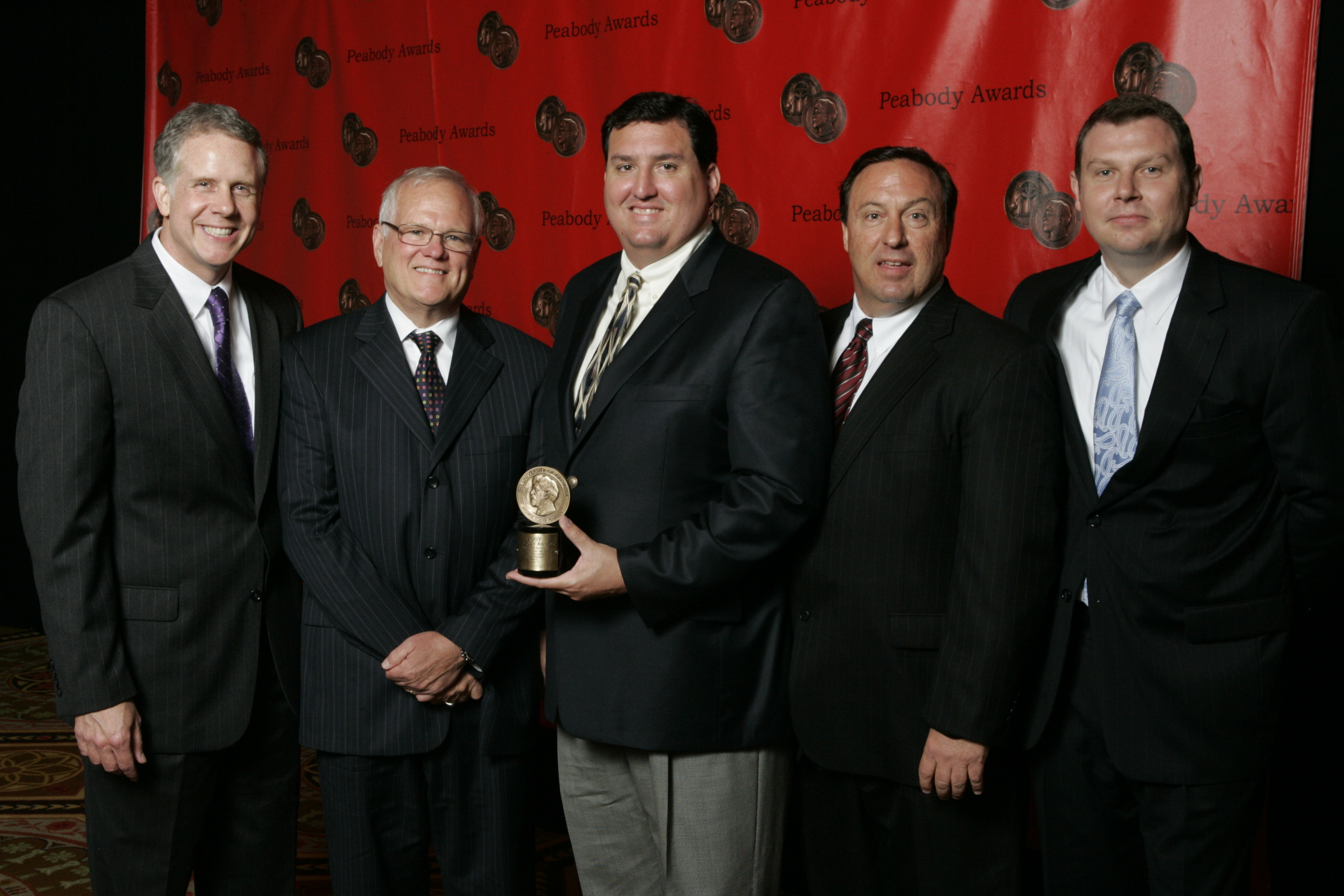
Mark Smith and the WFAA-TV team at the 67th Annual Peabody Awards.

Since 1986, WFAA's news department has won six Peabody Awards, with a seventh awarded personally to Marty Haag, WFAA's executive news director from 1973 to 1989 and vice president of news operations for Belo Corporation afterward. WFAA was honored with Peabody Awards in 1986 (for an investigative report that led to the Southern Methodist University Mustangs' "death penalty" sanction by the NCAA), 1995 (for The Peavy Investigation, a "revealing series of reports into insurance purchases involving the Dallas Independent School District... centered on the chairman of the Board of Education's Committee on Insurance"), 2002 (for the investigative report series Fake Drugs, Real Lives, about confidential informants who worked with Dallas police that planted powdered Sheetrock or billiard chalk near unsuspecting Mexican immigrants to "contrive drug cases"), 2004 (for State of Denial, a long-running series into improprieties in the Texas Workers Compensation Commission, part of the Texas Department of Insurance), 2007 (for four separate investigative stories: "Money for Nothing", about a major U.S. financial institution that made loans to non-existent companies in Mexico; "The Buried and the Dead", on the safety issues of pipelines carrying gas into homes; "Television Justice", about regional law-enforcement officers who collaborated with news crews to produce a prime time television program; and "Kinder Prison", on the deplorable conditions at a juvenile detention facility) and 2010 (for "Bitter Lessons", an investigation into government-funded career schools). The station has also been recognized with several national Edward R. Murrow Awards and eight duPont-Columbia University Silver Batons.

Coinciding with the commencement of local programming production at the Plaza Towers studios in Victory Park, WFAA began broadcasting its newscasts and other local programs in high definition on February 2, 2007, becoming the first television station in the Dallas–Fort Worth market to begin broadcasting their newscasts in the format on a regular basis. Initially, all footage shot in-studio was broadcast in high definition, while all news video from on-remote locations was upconverted in standard definition.

In 2009, WFAA became the first local station to receive the Alfred I. duPont-Columbia University Award's Gold Baton, for its commitment to investigative journalism; reporters Byron Harris and Brett Shipp were recognized for investigative reports about corruption and waste at the Export-Import Bank of the United States, grade changing for failing high school athletes (among the Dallas Independent School District high schools exposed in that report were South Oak Cliff High School, and Franklin D. Roosevelt High School) and dangers posed by aging gas pipeline couplings (an investigation that was featured on the PBS documentary series Exposé: America's Investigative Reports in the episode "Beneath the North Texas Dirt"). On September 12, 2013, WFAA debuted an hour-long weekday 4 p.m. newscast, which competes against existing hour-long newscasts in that slot on KXAS and KTVT.

==== Notable current on-air staff ====
- Pete Delkus (AMS and NWA Seals of Approval) – chief meteorologist
- Alex Rozier – reporter

==== Notable former on-air staff ====
- Ralph Baker Jr. – host of The Group And Chapman and Sump'n Else (1964–1970)
- Julie Bologna – weekend morning meteorologist (2011–2016)
- Ron Chapman – host of The Group And Chapman and Sump'n Else (1964–1968)
- Aaron Chimbel – mobile journalist (2006–2009)
- Lin Sue Cooney – anchor/reporter (1980–1984)
- Ron Corning – Daybreak anchor (2011–2019)
- Troy Dungan – chief weathercaster (1976–2007)
- Bill Evans – meteorologist (1987–1989)
- Shon Gables – Daybreak weekend co-anchor (2010–2014)
- Chris Gailus – Daybreak co-anchor (2000–2003)
- David Garcia – weekend anchor/reporter (1965–1968)
- Leeza Gibbons – reporter/co-host of PM Magazine (early 1980s)
- Dale Hansen – sports director (1983–2021)
- Don Harris – reporter/anchor (1967–1973)
- Brad Hawkins – Daybreak anchor
- Jerry Haynes – host of Peppermint Place, (the WFAA-produced local morning show) The Early Show, Dallas Bandstand and The Julie Bennell Show (1949–1970 and 1975–1996)
- Jackie Hyland – Daybreak anchor/reporter (2005–2007)
- Iola Johnson – anchor/reporter (1973–1985; last with KTXA as host of Positively Texas)
- Charlie Jones – sports director (?–1965)
- Andrea Joyce – sports reporter (1987–1988)
- Verne Lundquist – sports anchor/host of Bowling for Dollars (1967–1983)
- Bill Macatee – sports anchor
- John McCaa – anchor (1984–2019)
- Lisa McRee – anchor/reporter (1989–1991)
- Don Meredith – sports reporter (1966)
- Russ Mitchell – anchor (1983–1985)
- Bill O'Reilly – reporter
- Scott Pelley – reporter (1982–1989)
- Uma Pemmaraju – reporter
- Robyne Robinson – reporter (1985–1987)
- Tracy Rowlett – anchor (1974–1999)
- David Schechter – reporter (2006–2022)
- Rene Syler – anchor/reporter (1992–1997)
- Wes Wise – sports anchor (1950s)
- Paula Zahn – reporter (1978–1979)

== Community outreach ==
WFAA pioneered community outreach in 1977 with featured news segments and public service announcements. The first was "Wednesday's Child", which profiled children in need of an adoptive family and was descended from a feature segment on News 8 Etc.; the current iteration was initially conducted by John Criswell during his stint as co-host of the retooled AM, before becoming a weekly feature on WFAA's 10 p.m. newscast in September 1980. In 1994, the station began conducting town hall meetings all over North Texas through its Family First (F1) initiative, which remains a significant part of the station's commitment to community service.

== Controversy ==
=== Jimmy Kimmel monologue cut-off ===
WFAA came under scrutiny in May 2022 when the station extended its newscast past 10:35 p.m. to cover the Uvalde school shooting. A monologue by Jimmy Kimmel which addressed the shooting and gun control was partially blocked out by commercials. A statement from the station claimed that computer automation which preset the commercial breaks and triggered them as if the coverage did not take place caused that night's episode of Jimmy Kimmel Live! to be partially preempted. The monologue was made available on WFAA's website and on Kimmel's social media channel. The episode was already available on Hulu and other services by the next day.

== Technical information ==
=== Subchannels ===
The station's signal is multiplexed:

Subchannels of WFAA
Subchannel	Res.	Short name	Programming
8.1	720p	WFAA	ABC
8.2	480i	WX 8	WFAA Two
8.3	480i	Crime	True Crime Network
8.4	480i	Quest	Quest
8.5	480i	ShopLC	Court TV (soon)
29.4	480i	ShopLC	Shop LC
29.5	480i	OPEN	[Blank]

=== Analog-to-digital conversion ===
WFAA became the first television station in the United States to broadcast their digital television signal on a VHF channel on February 27, 1998, at 2:17 p.m., when it began test broadcasts on VHF channel 9; the following day on February 28, it became the nation's first television station to broadcast a local news program in high definition. When the transmission tests began, the digital feed's Channel 9 assignment was already in use by Dallas area hospitals; this would result in Baylor University Medical Center and Methodist Dallas Medical Center having to reconfigure their telemetry systems to different frequencies before WFAA began full-time digital transmissions on March 16 (when it became the country's first commercial station to begin regular digital broadcasts on the VHF band) as the station's assigned digital channel corresponded to a portion of the broadcast spectrum used by the hospitals for their wireless medical equipment, creating RF interference issues that notably disrupted several wireless heart monitors at both facilities.

WFAA shut down its analog signal, over VHF channel 8, at 12:03 p.m. on June 12, 2009, as part of the federally mandated transition from analog to digital television. The station's digital signal relocated from VHF channel 9 to channel 8. Immediately before WFAA ceased transmission of its analog signal, the station aired a retrospective of its history that was narrated by chief meteorologist Pete Delkus, which was followed by a video of the sign-off that the station had aired at the conclusion of its broadcast day during the 1970s.

On December 23, 2009, WFAA filed an application to the FCC to obtain permission to increase its transmitter's effective radiated power (ERP) from 45 kW through an omni-directional antenna to 55 kW, through the installation of a directional antenna. The reasoning behind its proposal for the power increase was due to difficulties experienced by some viewers in portions of the Dallas–Fort Worth market who tried to maintain adequate over-the-air reception of the channel 8 digital signal.
