= Jackie Hyland =

- Born: Queens, New York, U.S.
- Occupation: Television journalist

Jackie Hyland, born in New York City, is a television news anchor.

Hyland lived for 10 years in Drumshanbo, County Leitrim, Ireland as a child where she was proficient in Irish folk song and dance, appeared in several Irish magazines and newspapers and did runway work.. After high school she moved to Dublin where she modeled for "The Brand Agency". She returned to New York where she attended St. John's University where she earned a degree in communications with a minor in business.

She began her broadcasting career at ABC's Good Morning America. She subsequently worked at News12 Long Island, and at News12 Westchester, as a producer, a reporter and an anchor. Hyland and Bob Lape (formerly of WABC-TV) also co-hosted a business program called "The CPA Report". She joined WPIX-TV as a General Assignment Reporter and Anchor in 2000. In August 2005, she joined WFAA-TV where she anchored the morning news show, Daybreak, and the midday news, for a time she also co-hosted "Good Morning Texas". Hyland left News8 at the end of 2007. Family matters took Hyland and her husband back to New York City. Hyland worked as a freelance reporter for WCBS-TV. She also did some correspondent work for CNBC's "High Net Worth" and "The Business of Innovation", before anchoring for ABC News Now. Hyland returned to WPIX as a weekend anchor then general reporter before leaving in April 2011. On September 20, 2011, she joined WRAL-TV in Raleigh, NC as an evening anchor. She left WRAL in June, 2015.

== Awards ==
- 2006 Lone Star Emmy Award: News 8 Daybreak Best Morning Newscast
- 2005 Folio Award: Breaking News: Missing Mom
- 2004 New York Emmy Award: Multi-Part News Feature: Friday Night Feasts
- 2004 New York State AP Association: Special Mention: SUV Hidden Dangers
- 2002 New York Institute of Technology Achievement Award
- Top 30 in Irish Media, Irish Voice Magazine
