= David Garcia (journalist) =

American journalist (1944–2007)

David Garcia (January 8, 1944 – August 28, 2007) was a broadcast journalist for ABC News. Garcia had the distinction of becoming one of the first Hispanic news correspondents for a major American television network in the 1970s.

Garcia was born James David Garcia, in Temple, Texas and briefly attended Baylor University in the 1960s, but said they had little or nothing to teach him, so he left. He began his career at a local radio in Temple at KTEM while in high school and was soon hired by WFAA radio in Dallas, Texas. He possessed an unusually deep voice with a rounded, warm sound that marked his on-air delivery with authority. The 1960s were a period when the older style of stern sounding newscasters on radio and television was giving way to a more informal, friendly style. Garcia's voice and delivery neatly bridged the changing era. During his time with WFAA radio, Garcia was selected to anchor the Saturday evening newscasts on WFAA-TV, a job he was carrying out, along with radio reporting, at the time he was hired by ABC radio in New York in 1969.

While working for ABC News, Garcia served as a secondary reporter at the White House during the Richard Nixon, Gerald Ford and Jimmy Carter administrations. He later was named chief of ABC's Latin America bureau, where he covered the assassination of Nicaraguan President Anastasio Somoza Garcia, among other stories. While working in Latin America, Garcia became interested in environmental reporting after visiting rain forests in the region. He later moved to Los Angeles, California where his career included stints at KNXT (now KCBS-TV), KNBC and KTTV. His duties at KNXT included anchoring general reporting and hosting a public affairs program titled At Issue/With David Garcia. He covered the environmental beat from the mid-1980s to the early 1990s at KNBC and from 1993 to 2001 at KTTV, where he served as the station's environmental reporter earning the nickname "Earthman." As Earthman, Garcia achieved such visibility throughout the Los Angeles area that children would send him letters addressed "Earthman, Los Angeles" and the postal service would deliver them to Garcia at his station. In 2002 he began hosting a newsmagazine show titled Eye on Riverside County at Palm Springs CBS affiliate KPSP-LP. It was during this period that Garcia and his wife, Susan Garcia, went "on the road" together with a video camera and produced half hour programs around the American west for a local public broadcasting station. His wife would shoot and edited the video, Garcia would narrate and appear on camera. He and his wife were actively engaged in this pursuit at the time for his death.

Garcia died in Rancho Mirage, California of complications from a liver ailment at the age of 63.
