= Marty Haag =

H. Martin Haag
- Born: 1934
- Died: 2004 (aged 69–70)
- Education: Texas Christian University; Columbia University Graduate School of Journalism

H. Martin "Marty" Haag, Jr. (1934–2004) was the news director at the perennially dominant ABC station, WFAA-TV, in Dallas, Texas from 1973 to 1989. During those 16 years, WFAA won five DuPont-Columbia Awards, more than any other local television news station during that time, and a George Foster Peabody Award in 1988.

== Education ==
Haag earned his bachelor's degree from the University of Missouri in Columbia, Missouri after attending Texas Christian University for one year. His college roommate at TCU was Jim Lehrer. He earned a Master's degree in Journalism from Columbia University.

== Career ==
Haag began his journalism career in print as an education reporter and editor for The Dallas Morning News during the late 1950s. He then moved to radio as news director at WBAP in Dallas before finding his true niche in television. Haag served first as national assignment editor and overnight manager at NBC News, then worked as an assistant news director at CBS News in New York City before joining a then ratings-impaired WFAA in 1973, becoming their executive news director.

Over the next decades, Marty Haag and WFAA reached national prominence, most notably from their coverage of the Delta Air Lines Flight 191 crash at Dallas-Fort Worth Airport in 1985. CNN carried WFAA's live feed for the entire day.

Under Haag's guidance at WFAA, many of the station's reporters went on to join the major news networks. They include Mauri Dial Moore, Rita Flynn, Bob Brown, Scott Pelley, Paula Zahn, Verne Lundquist, Bill Macatee, Andrea Joyce, Peter Van Sant, Russ Mitchell, Leeza Gibbons, and Bill O'Reilly, Kay Vinson

In 1989, Haag moved to WFAA's parent company, Belo, to become the Senior Vice-President of Broadcast News Operations and to oversee the company's stations across the country; thus handing over the executive news director duties to John Miller, who was previously assistant news director. He retired in 2000.

That year, Haag received the broadcast industry's highest honor, the George Foster Peabody Award for lifetime achievement. The organization described Haag as "an industry icon, who's helped establish high ethical standards and quality reporting at both local and network news levels." Former Nightline anchor Ted Koppel said in a letter to the Peabody committee that WFAA operates at a network level because "it reflects Marty Haag's sense of professionalism, his high standards and his impeccable value system."

== Retirement ==
After retirement, Haag worked as a consultant and taught several journalism courses at Southern Methodist University.

Haag died of a stroke on January 10, 2004.

== Criticism ==
Barbara Cochran of the Radio-Television News Directors Association called Haag, "... one of the best and brightest the television news business has ever known".
