= National Weather Service Fort Worth, Texas =

NWS Forecast Office serving Dallas-Fort Worth, north central Texas

Fort Worth-Dallas, Texas Weather Forecast Office

Agency overview
- Jurisdiction: Federal Government of the United States
- Headquarters: 3401 Northern Cross Blvd, Fort Worth, TX 76137; 32°50′5.647″N 97°17′55.323″W
- Parent agency: National Weather Service
- Website: www.srh.noaa.gov/fwd

The National Weather Service Fort Worth, Texas (NWS Fort Worth) is a local weather forecast office of the National Weather Service responsible for monitoring weather conditions for 46 counties in north central Texas, including the Dallas-Fort Worth Metro Area (the Metroplex) and Waco, Texas.

== History ==
=== Present day ===
The current National Weather Service Fort Worth is located at 3401 Northern Cross Blvd, Fort Worth, TX in the northeastern part of Fort Worth, near Meacham International Airport, and is in charge of issuing local forecasts and weather warnings for north central Texas. It is one of 13 National Weather Service offices located in Texas.

The building that the Fort Worth office is located in also houses the West Gulf River Forecast Center, one of 13 in the United States. This office is responsible for the entire river basin between the Sabine River along the Texas-Louisiana border in the east to the Rio Grande River in southern Colorado, New Mexico, and south Texas. Other rivers in the responsibility area of the WGRFC include the Pecos, Nueces, San Antonio River, Guadalupe, Colorado, Brazos, Trinity, and Neches rivers.

== NOAA Weather Radio ==
NOAA Weather Radio logo

The Fort Worth Weather Forecast Office maintains thirteen NOAA Weather Radio transmitters across north Texas and far south Oklahoma to transmit routine extended and specialized short-term forecasts, current weather observations, hazardous weather outlooks and historical weather information. Each of the transmitters, through the Emergency Alert System, also disseminate watches, warnings and advisories issued by the NWS office, severe thunderstorm and tornado watches issued by the Storm Prediction Center and other emergency information to the public.

The office schedules a required weekly test of the Specific Area Message Encoding system for public alert dissemination on all thirteen NOAA Weather Radio transmitters in the region each Wednesday between 10:00 a.m. and 12:00 p.m. and between 6:00 p.m. and 8:00 p.m. (all times Central); exceptions exist if there is a threat of severe weather that day within the listening area of any or all of the stations, in which case the test will be postponed until the following Wednesday, barring that severe weather is not forecast to occur then.

=== The Lightning Bolt ===
Since early 2009, all NOAA Weather Radio Stations within the North Texas region began airing a monthly 15 minute talk show titled "The Lightning Bolt" where two to five listener-submitted questions related to weather are answered by meteorologists, who also would provide weather-related safety tips and trivia.

=== Stations ===
City of license	Call sign	Frequency (MHz)	Counties served
Fort Worth	KEC55	162.550 MHz	Bosque, Collin, Dallas, Denton, Ellis, Erath, Hill, Hood, Johnson, Parker, Somervell, Tarrant, and Wise
Dallas	KEC56	162.400 MHz	Collin, Dallas, Denton, Ellis, Hunt, Kaufman, Rockwall, and Tarrant
Muenster	KHA99	162.425 MHz	Cooke, Denton, Grayson, Montague, and Wise counties in Texas as well as Carter, Jefferson, and Love counties in Oklahoma
Cumby	KWN31	162.500 MHz	Collin, Delta, Fannin, Franklin, Hopkins, Hunt, Kaufman, Rains, Rockwall, Van Zandt, and Wood
Stephenville	KWN33	162.450 MHz	Bosque, Brown, Comanche, Eastland, Erath, Hamilton, Hood, Mills, Palo Pinto, Somervell, and Stephens
Palestine	KWN34	162.450 MHz	Anderson, Cherokee, Freestone, Henderson, Houston, Leon, and Navarro
Corsicana	KXI87	162.525 MHz	Anderson, Ellis, Erath, Freestone, Henderson, Hill, Kaufman, Limestone, Navarro, and Van Zandt
Cisco	WNG636	162.500 MHz	Brown, Callahan, Comanche, Eastland, Erath, Shackelford, and Stephens
Milano	WNG649	162.525 MHz	Bell, Brazos, Burleson, Falls, Hill, Lee, Milam, Robertson, and Williamson
Mineral Wells	WNG651	162.525 MHz	Erath, Hood, Jack, Palo Pinto, Parker, Stephens, Tarrant, Wise, and Young
Paris	WXK20	162.550 MHz	Delta, Fannin, Franklin, Hopkins, Hunt, Lamar, Red River, & Titus counties in Texas and Bryan & Choctaw counties in Oklahoma
Sherman	WXK22	162.475 MHz	Collin, Cooke, Denton, Fannin, and Grayson counties in Texas as well as Bryan, Carter, Johnston, Love, and Marshall counties in Oklahoma
Waco	WXK35	162.475 MHz	Bell, Bosque, Coryell, Falls, Hamilton, Hill, Lampasas, Limestone, McLennan, Milam, Navarro, and Robertson
