= Joan Prather =

American actress (born 1950)

- Occupation: Actress
- Years active: 1972–1989
- Known for: Eight Is Enough; Big Bad Mama; Take This Job and Shove It; Smile; Executive Suite
- Spouse: James Fiducia

Joan Prather is an American actress. She is perhaps best known for her role as Janet McArthur Bradford (wife of David) in Eight Is Enough.

== Early years ==
Prather's hometown is Dallas. Her father worked in real estate, and she said that her grandfather was the builder of the first shopping center in the world. Her parents divorced when she was 3 years old, and by 1979 her father had had four wives and her mother had had three husbands. She lived with her mother until she entered high school, when she began living with her father and his wife.

== Career ==
Prather debuted in a Dallas production of Under Milk Wood and made commercials for products, including Adidas, Coca-Cola, Folgers, and Ivory Soap She rejected the role of the title character's wife on Welcome Back, Kotter because she considered it too dull and turned down portraying Allison MacKenzie on Return to Peyton Place because she "would go crazy" in that part. Overall, she felt that television had "no creative license" and an actor "can get stuck into one cliched role".

== Film and television credits ==
Her film credits include The Single Girls (1974), Big Bad Mama (1974), The Devil's Rain (1975), Smile (1975), Rabbit Test (1978) and Take This Job and Shove It (1981).

She appeared in TV series such as Executive Suite, Eight Is Enough, CHiPs, Fantasy Island, and the 1980 edition of Battle of the Network Stars.

During her teen years, Joan was a featured "go-go" dancer on a local Dallas teen dance TV show Sump'n Else. The show ran from 1965 to 1968 and it was roughly modeled after "American Bandstand" and often featured national and local bands.

== Scientology ==
While on the set of The Devil's Rain, Prather told an "extremely unhappy" John Travolta that Scientology had helped her, inspiring him to get involved with the religion upon his later return to Los Angeles.

== Personal life ==
Prather married James Fiducia, a Scientology minister.

== Filmography ==
=== Film ===
Year	Title	Role	Notes
1972	The Thing with Two Heads	Nurse (uncredited)	
1973	The Single Girls	Lola	
1974	Big Bad Mama	Jane Kingston	
1975	Smile	Robin - Young American Miss	Comedy film
1975	The Devil's Rain	Julie Preston	Horror film
1978	Rabbit Test	Segoynia Savaka	Comedy film
1981	Take This Job and Shove It	Madelyn	

=== Television ===
Year	Title	Role	Notes
1973	Sanford and Son	Tour Guide	Episode: "A Visit from Lena Horne"
1973	Chase	Diane	Episode: "Six for Five"
1975	Happy Days	Ruth	Episode: "Open House"
1975	Lucas Tanner	Connie Tracy	Episode: "One to One"
1973-1975	Insight	Jean; Tina Forest	Episode: "Celebrate in Fresh Powder"; Episode: "Hunger Knows My Name"
1976	Dawn: Portrait of a Teenage Runaway	Susie	TV film
1976	The Quest	Jenny Caldwell	Episode: "Dynasty of Evil"
1976-1977	Executive Suite	Glory Dalessio	17 episodes
1977	The Hardy Boys/Nancy Drew Mysteries	Adriane	Episode: "The Mystery of the Ghostwriters' Cruise"
1978	The Deerslayer	Judith Hunter	TV film
1979	Hollywood Squares	Herself - Panelist	5 episodes
1979	Make Me Laugh	Herself	Episode: "Biff Maynard, Murray Langston and Bill Kirchenbauer"
1980	Battle of the Network Stars VIII	Herself - ABC Team	
1980	Whew!	Herself - Celebrity Partner	10 episodes
1979-1980	Eight Is Enough	Janet McArthur / Janet McArthur Bradford	19 episodes
1981	The Love Boat	Jill	Episode: "Sally's Paradise / I Love You, Too, Smith / Mama and Me"
1981	CHiPs	Felicia Chadway	Episode: "Concours d'Elegance"
1979-1983	Fantasy Island	Julie Brett; Delia Latham; Lauren Fandell; Melanie Jones	Episode: "The Mermaid / The Victim"; Episode: "Also Rans / Portrait of Solange"; Episode: "Druids / A Night in a Harem"; Episode: "Edward / Extraordinary Miss Jones"
1984	His Mistress	Lauren	TV film
1985	Sins of the Father	Megan	TV film
1985	Finder of Lost Loves	Robin Sloan	Episode: "Broken Promises"
1987	LBJ: The Early Years		TV film
1987	Eight Is Enough: A Family Reunion	Janet	TV film
1989	Protect and Surf	Mary Jo Ballerini	TV film
1989	Eight Is Enough Wedding	Janet	TV film
2000	E! True Hollywood Story	Herself	Episode: "Eight Is Enough"
