= Pete Delkus =

Meteorologist famous for the McKinney Weather glitch

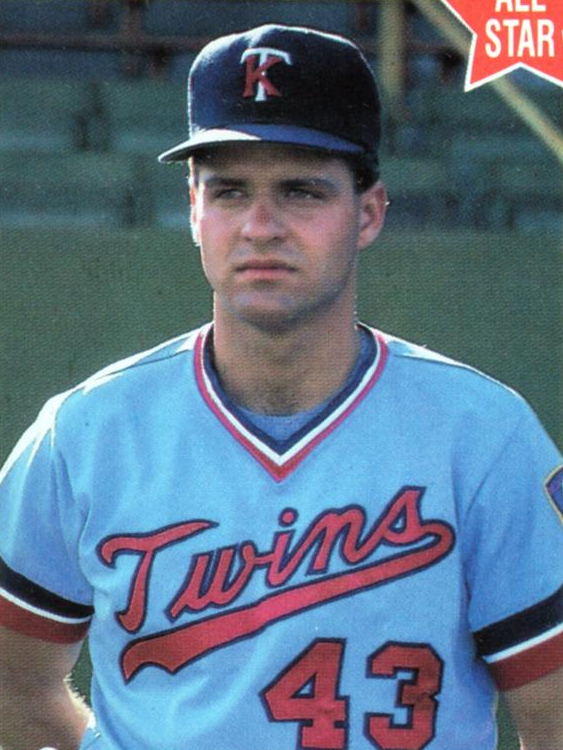
Delkus with the Kenosha Twins in 1988

Pete William Delkus (born September 4, 1965 in Collinsville, Illinois) is the Chief Meteorologist at Tegna-owned and ABC-affiliated WFAA-TV in Dallas, Texas, United States.

== Career ==
=== Baseball ===
Delkus was an All-America pitcher and had an all-star college career including a trip to the College World Series. He holds several records as a pitcher at SIUE. In 2005, Delkus was inducted into the SIUE Athletics Hall of Fame, as part of the inaugural class and the first baseball player. Out of college, Delkus signed as a Free Agent in 1987 with the Minnesota Twins organization. In 1988, while pitching for the double A Kenosha, Wisconsin, team, Delkus finished the season with 33 saves and a 0.26 ERA. The following year in triple A Orlando, Delkus played 140 innings and saved 10 games with a 1.87 ERA. Delkus received the "Minnesota Twins Minor League Player of the Year" and the Rolaids Relief Man awards. His career ended prematurely due to a serious elbow injury. Delkus played professional baseball for parts of six years with the Minnesota Twins organization. In 2023, Delkus was inducted into the Greater St. Louis Amateur Baseball Hall of Fame as a member of the 50th Anniversary Class.

=== Meteorology ===
From 1996 to 2005, Delkus was the chief meteorologist at WCPO-TV, the ABC affiliate in Cincinnati, Ohio. While there, he received a pair of first place Associated Press Awards for best regularly scheduled weather. Prior to joining WCPO-TV, Delkus worked as a meteorologist for four years at WFTV, the ABC affiliate in Orlando, Florida. Delkus joined WFAA-TV in June 2005. He has both the American Meteorological Society and the National Weather Association seals of approval. He attended Mississippi State University for his master's-level meteorology courses, and holds a Bachelor of Science in TV, Radio, and Film from Southern Illinois University Edwardsville (SIUE). While at WFAA, trade magazine Broadcasting & Cable honored him with the title of "Top Meteorologist in America". Additionally, he has won twenty Emmy Awards for "Outstanding Weather Anchor", "Outstanding Weathercast", "Outstanding Host of a News Special" and "Outstanding Host of Special Event Coverage - Big D NYE". He has also been awarded four times by the Associated Press, First Place winner of "Best Weathercast" in Texas.

==== Meme ====
While presenting the weather on WFAA on 20 July 2023, Delkus jokingly proclaimed that "everyone in McKinney is dead" in response to a glitch in the on-screen temperature map, when the heat index for McKinney, Texas was shown to be 101,105 °F.

== Personal life ==
Delkus lives in the Dallas suburb of Plano, Texas, with his wife and two children.
