= John McCaa =

American journalist

- Born: 1954 (age 71–72); Rantoul, Illinois
- Education: Creighton University; University of Dallas; University of Texas at Dallas
- Occupation: Television anchor
- Years active: 1977 - 2019
- Employer: WFAA
- Organization: ABC
- Successor: Chris Lawrence
- Spouse: Nora Mcaa
- Children: Colin Mcaa
- Awards: 2 Emmys

John McCaa (born in Rantoul, Illinois) is a news anchor who is known for working for WFAA-TV in Dallas, Texas. He worked for WFAA from 1984 until his retirement on March 1, 2019.

== Early life and education ==
McCaa was raised in an Air Force family that moved frequently. McCaa attended high school in Madrid, Spain. He then moved back to Nebraska, where he had lived before Spain, for a Jesuit education, and a degree in journalism and mass communication from Creighton University in Omaha, Nebraska. He later earned a master's degree in politics from the University of Dallas and a PhD in Humanities-History of Ideas from The University of Texas at Dallas.

== Journalism career ==
After graduating, McCaa worked in Omaha for more than seven years in anchoring and reporting, with WOWT-TV, an NBC affiliate. In 1984, he came to WFAA to work in the Fort Worth newsroom as a reporter. He was later promoted to chief of the newsroom. He then transferred to the Dallas newsroom. He became the weekend news anchor, then news manager. At one time, he also served as co-anchor for the 5 p.m. newscast. During the 2000 presidential primaries, McCaa hosted a series of webcasts from the Republican convention.

John McCaa

Academic background
- Education: University of Texas at Dallas
- Thesis: Fame, celebrity & mass media in the digital age: Daniel Boorstin's cultural decline, or passport to a parallel universe? (2015)
- Doctoral advisor: Daniel B. Wickberg, Ph.D

In 1992, McCaa became the co-anchor of the 5:00 p.m., 6:00 p.m., and 10:00 p.m. weekday newscasts, mostly anchoring alongside Gloria Campos until her

retirement in 2014. Cynthia Izaguirre replaced Campos and co-anchored with McCaa until his retirement. During the 10 p.m. newscast on August 6, 2018, McCaa announced his retirement. His last day in the WFAA newsroom was March 1, 2019, where he did his final broadcast, ending his 35 year career at WFAA. Chris Lawrence has replaced McCaa in the co-anchor’s chair.

== Personal life ==
McCaa is married to his wife Nora McCaa and has one grown son Collin McCaa. He enjoys playing the drums in his spare time.
