= Merger of Nexstar Media Group and Tegna Inc. =

Business transaction from 2025 to 2026

- Initiator: Nexstar Media Group
- Target: Tegna Inc.
- Type: Full acquisition
- Cost: US$6.2 billion
- Initiated: August 19, 2025; 14 months ago
- Completed: March 19, 2026; 7 months ago
- Status: Closed, integration activities halted by a preliminary injunction

On August 19, 2025, American media company Nexstar Media Group announced its intent to acquire competitor Tegna Inc. The acquisition brought together two of the United States's largest owners of broadcast TV stations, with overlapping holdings in 35 local markets. While Nexstar cited synergies from the increased ownership of multiple stations in a changing media landscape, critics found the deal would result in newsroom closures, job losses, and higher retransmission consent rates paid by multichannel video programming distributors such as cable and satellite broadcasters. The size and scope of the company relative to a national ownership cap was also in dispute. The Federal Communications Commission (FCC) announced its approval of the transaction on March 19, 2026. The FCC's Media Bureau waived the national cap and required only six divestitures within two years of the merger closing; this, along with the absence of a public vote among the commissioners, drew bipartisan criticism.

Shortly before the closing, satellite television provider DirecTV and a coalition of eight state attorneys general filed to halt the merger in the U.S. District Court for the Eastern District of California. Federal judge Troy Nunley ordered a halt to integration activities in a temporary restraining order issued on March 27, 2026, superseded by a preliminary injunction issued on April 17. As a result, although Nexstar has closed on its acquisition of Tegna, Tegna and its subsidiaries temporarily continue to operate autonomously under Nexstar ownership, as the injunction forbids Nexstar from absorbing Tegna's assets and operations. As of April 30, 2026, 13 state attorneys general were part of the action.

== Background ==
=== Tegna Inc. ===
Tegna Inc. was created in 2015 after the Gannett Company (later renamed as the USA Today Co. due to their ownership of the USA Today newspaper in 2025) split into two companies, with Tegna focused solely on broadcasting assets and Gannett on newspapers and publishing. Tegna had been on the market previously, beginning when activist shareholder Soo Kim expressed interest in the company in March 2020, and engaged in two failed proxy fights for control of the board of directors in 2020 and 2021. In 2022, the company agreed to be taken private by Kim's hedge fund Standard General, with financing assistance from Apollo Global Management. Standard would have replaced the management and divested some stations to Cox Media Group, in which Apollo owned a stake. The deal encountered opposition from Democratic-aligned political figures, among them Nancy Pelosi, and was designated for hearing by an administrative law judge in February 2023. This was seen as a death knell for the transaction, which was terminated three months later. Brendan Carr, then part of the Republican minority in the Federal Communications Commission (FCC), approved of the buyout and issued a joint statement with Nathan Simington critical of the designation, which was handled by the FCC Media Bureau.

=== Nexstar Media Group ===
Nexstar Media Group was founded in 1996 as Nexstar Broadcasting Group by president/CEO Perry Sook with the purchase of WYOU in Scranton, Pennsylvania. Nexstar's history has been defined by continuous mergers and acquisitions including Media General in 2016 and Tribune Broadcasting in 2019; these included divestitures of overlap stations to satisfy ownership restrictions. Nexstar has used shell companies to evade restrictions dating back to when WYOU was sold to what is now Mission Broadcasting so WBRE-TV could be acquired. The Tribune purchase prompted WPIX in New York City to be sold to the E. W. Scripps Company, but purchased by Mission in 2021, with Nexstar operating it via a local marketing agreement. In 2024, the FCC, then chaired by Jessica Rosenworcel, fined Nexstar $1.5 million after determining it illegally circumvented restrictions with the WPIX LMA, an action Carr publicly disagreed with.

There was never any doubt that the deals would be reached in my mind. We didn't keep any secrets as to what our intentions were from the beginning. We either come to an agreement or we pull the signal, which we have done in the past. It's only fair to be compensated for a service you provide.

— Duane Lammers, Nexstar chief operating officer, after signing contracts with several Arkansas cable companies in 2005

In January 2005, Nexstar entered into a retransmission consent dispute with Cox Communications and Cable One that blacked out 27 stations owned by Nexstar and Mission from both companies nationwide. Nexstar sought a monthly increase of 30 cents per subscriber, which Cox and Cable One claimed would result in higher rates for subscribers. This dispute had origins in the 1992 Cable Act, which enabled stations to charge cable operators for the rights to carry their signals. Despite Nexstar COO Duane Lammers saying the company was "in solid financial health" Nexstar lost $140 million between 2001 and 2005 and was $600 million in debt; compensation from the Big Four networks to Nexstar also fell 22.4 percent in 2005 and another 36.4 percent in 2006. Lammers led the company's bargaining efforts and gained a reputation for hardball tactics; Lammers viewed the dispute as the first battle of "an all-out war or our industry is going to go out of business".

The dispute ended after ten months when Cox agreed to a long-term contract and followed losses in revenue from all parties. Cox and Cable One did not pay the straight license fee increases Nexstar demanded, but agreed to spend additional money advertising on Nexstar stations. Additional contracts with cable providers in Arkansas were agreed to right as a December 31, 2005, deadline approached, meeting all of Nexstar's demands; Sook estimated those deals represented an additional $12 million per year. Lammers left Nexstar in 2008, but began consulting other station groups on cable retransmission negotiations. In 2008, retransmission fees constituted 4.5 percent of Nexstar's revenue; by 2012, this increased to 14.5 percent and enabled the company to purchase more stations. Sook told D Magazine in 2020, "without it [retransmission revenue from cable], we'd be in worse shape than the newspaper business".

Nexstar relaunched WGN America, a cable channel included with the Tribune merger, as NewsNation over a four-year process beginning in 2020. At launch, NewsNation was billed as a centrist, "just the facts" cable news outlet with minimal punditry, drawing on the resources of the company's local news departments. Nexstar purchased The Hill in 2021 along with 75 percent majority control of The CW in 2022. The company boasted a stable balance sheet and a minimum of debt and publicly expressed a desire to buy additional stations; in 2023, a senior advisor to Sook told Deadline Hollywood Nexstar could buy the ABC Owned Television Stations from The Walt Disney Company with "little friction" if they became available.

=== The FCC and deregulation ===
The FCC previously entertained attempts at relaxing or removing restrictions on television station ownership. Michael Powell's tenure as FCC chair during the George W. Bush administration was highlighted by deregulation and heightened content scrutiny, but one 2003 initiative to raise the national ownership cap from 35 percent to 45 percent was approved by the commission and ultimately settled at 39 percent after Congress intervened and NBC, CBS and Fox sued in federal court. On April 20, 2017, the FCC, under chair Ajit Pai, voted to reinstate the "UHF discount", a policy enacted in 1985 allowing station groups to count UHF stations by only 50 percent of their population for ownership cap purposes. The discount, seen as outdated following the 2009 digital television switch, (Note: Because of the digital television switch, the UHF discount now applies to stations physically broadcasting on the UHF band (channels 14 through 36), but the station may have historically broadcast on the VHF band and have a lower virtual channel number (2–13).) was repealed by prior chair Tom Wheeler in June 2016 during the FCC's combined 2010 and 2014 Quadrennial Review, which retained and tightened other restrictions. Pai's reinstatement of the discount, among other regulatory relaxing, was regarded by industry analysts to help assist Sinclair Broadcast Group's attempted purchase of Tribune Media, which was announced several days later.

Rosenworcel, Pai's successor, upheld existing restrictions in December 2023 during the 2018 Quadrennial Review. Carr issued a public statement objecting to her "ostrich-like" approach, saying, "[t]he law compels us to do so. The facts tell us to do so. And the public interest in promoting local news and information counsel in favor of doing so. Yet the rules will remain in place, impervious to those compelling forces".

=== Brendan Carr as FCC chair ===
The whole system is kind of cratering right now because of this. In my opinion, there's a fair amount of greed here on all sides because this was a highly profitable industry and nobody really wants to be the one to have to give up the profits.

— Emily Barr, former Graham Media Group president and CEO, on declining retransmission revenue for television broadcasters due to a decline in cable subscribers

After Donald Trump was re-elected president in 2024, forecasters predicted a more favorable environment for media mergers, increasing mergers and acquisitions activity in local television. Station groups and the National Association of Broadcasters (NAB) agitated for relaxation of ownership rules both within specific media markets and nationally, in particular the 39 percent ownership cap. They cited the increasing movement of programming and advertising revenue to digital and streaming media outlets. Whereas over two-thirds of U.S. adults subscribed to cable television in 2000 per Pew Research, by 2025, this number decreased to 36 percent, while 83 percent of U.S. adults subscribed to at least one streaming service. Hank Price, columnist for TVNewsCheck, saw this potential deregulation as a necessity, writing, "... most communities now have more television stations producing more hours of local news than is economically viable. This has created extreme financial pressure on stations, raising the specter of some owners becoming unable to continue."

Carr was elevated to FCC chair at the start of Trump's second term in January 2025. His promotion was praised by Perry Sook in a Nexstar press release, who said, "He is an outstanding choice who understands the needs of local broadcasters and we look forward to working with him during this transformational era." Carr demonstrated an aggressive bully pulpit tone seen as a marked departure from past FCC chairs. During the merger of Skydance Media and Paramount Global, Carr demanded multiple conditions including the installment of an ombudsman for CBS News and later claimed in an interview that CBS's non-renewal of The Late Show with Stephen Colbert helped meet regulatory approval. The Wall Street Journal noted that media companies that have had previous public altercations with Trump would be less motivated to participate in potential deals.

The Federal Communications Commission under the second presidency of Donald Trump

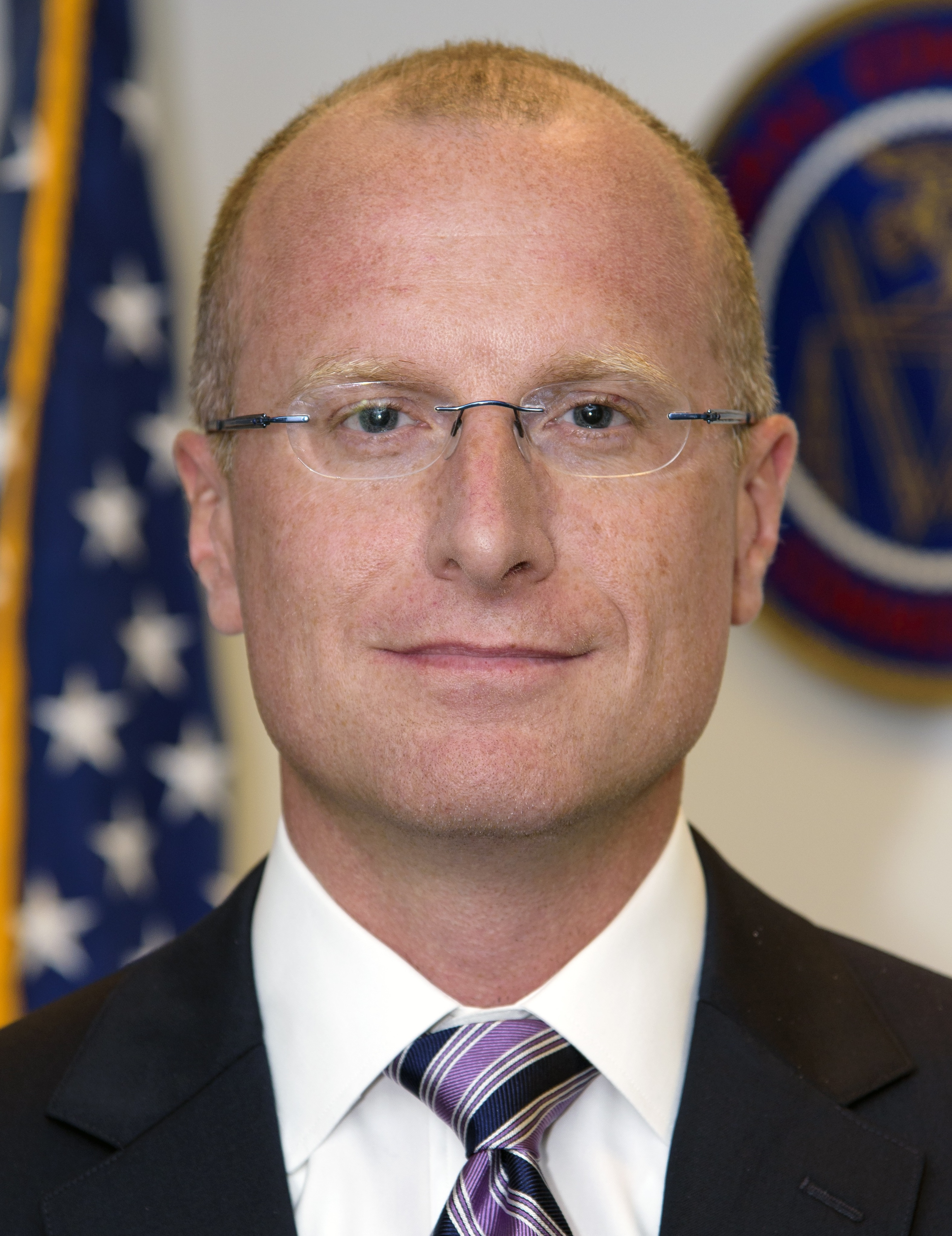
Brendan Carr, chair (Republican), nominated and confirmed in 2017, elevated to chair in 2025

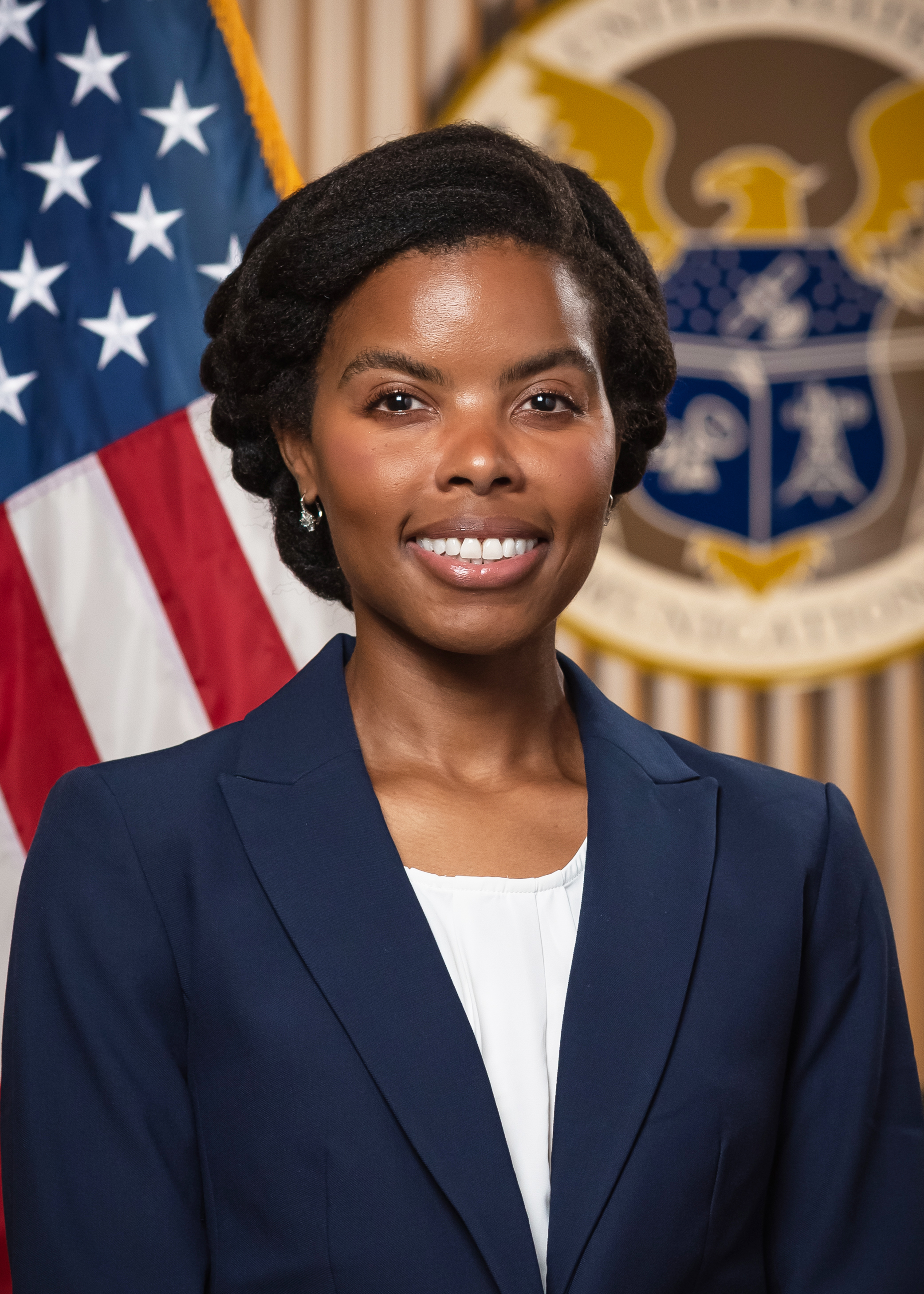
Olivia Trusty, commissioner (Republican), nominated and confirmed in 2025

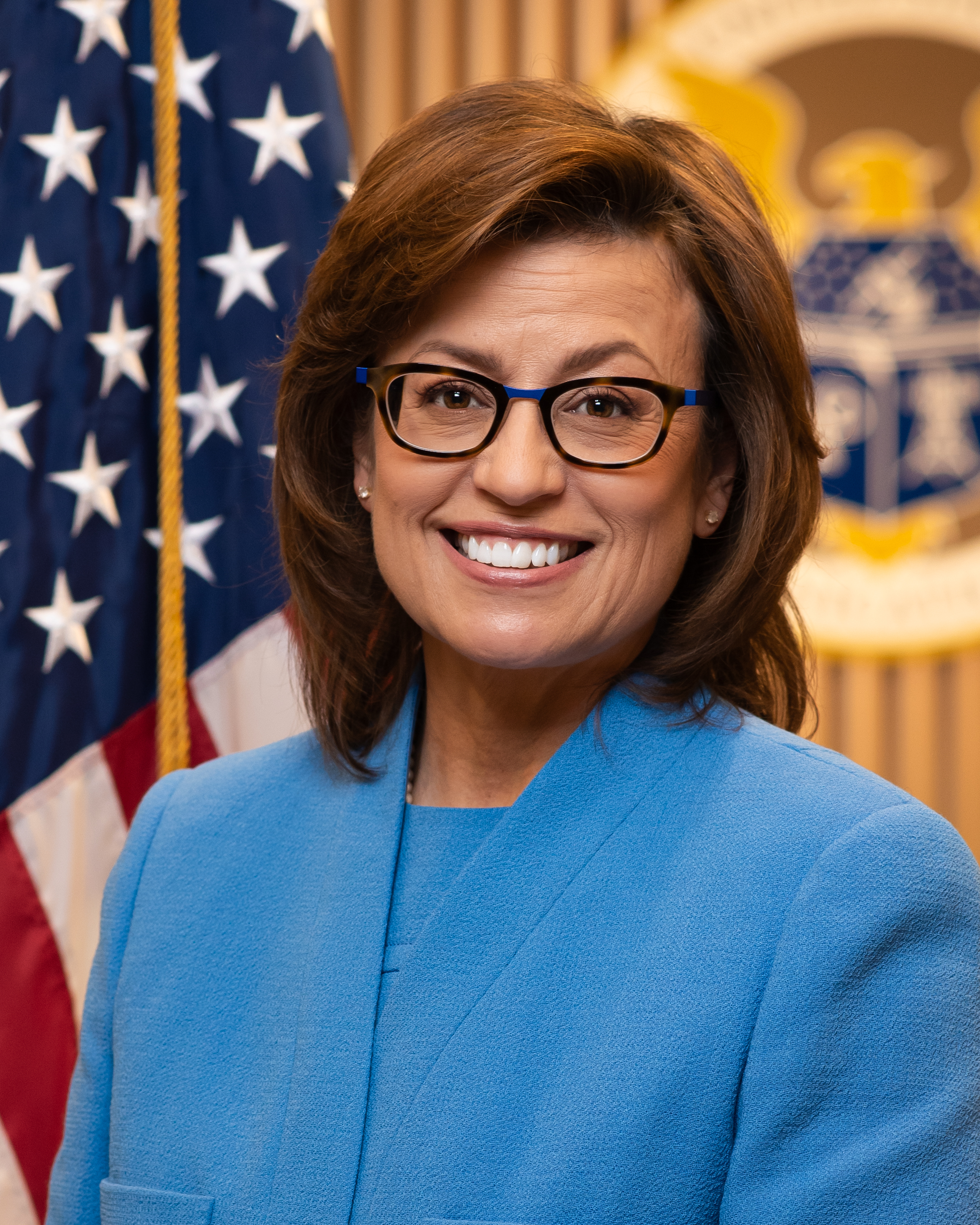
Anna M. Gomez, commissioner (Democrat), nominated and confirmed under President Joe Biden in 2023

Following the resignation of Geoffrey Starks in March 2025, Carr announced the creation of an initiative titled "Delete, Delete, Delete" aimed at repealing existing laws and, according to Carr, "unleashing a new wave of economic opportunity by ending the regulatory onslaught from Washington". In July 2025, the United States Court of Appeals for the Eighth Circuit issued Zimmer Radio of Mid-Missouri v. FCC, in which it struck down limitations on one company owning two of the top four TV stations in a market, the same rule Price advocated the commission abolish. Following this, multiple transactions were announced, including a multi-market swap of stations between Gray Media and the E. W. Scripps Company; Sinclair Broadcast Group's acquisition of multiple stations owned by Deerfield Media and other shell companies; and Gray's purchase of several stations owned by Allen Media Group, many of which in markets where Gray already had a station.

Scripps also sold WFTX-TV in Fort Myers, Florida, to WXCW owner Sun Broadcasting on September 3, 2025. This was announced after Beasley Broadcast Group split their Fort Myers cluster to Sun and Fort Myers Broadcasting, owner of WINK-TV and operator of all Sun stations under a shared services agreement. Because of the long-established deep connections between the two companies, both deals placed three full-power television stations, three low-power television stations, eleven FM stations, one AM station, and eleven low-power FM translators under common management in the same market. When the WFTX-TV sale closed in March 2026, WFTX began airing WINK-TV–produced newscasts. An additional Scripps station, WRTV in Indianapolis, was sold in October 2025 to Circle City Broadcasting, owner of WISH-TV and WNDY-TV. When that deal closed, Circle City fired the entirety of WRTV's staff while evening newscasts were being prepared.

== Merger ==
Largest local broadcast station groups in the United States
Company	Total revenue in USD^{1}	Media markets served^{2}; (Ownership cap percentage^{3})
Nexstar	5,400,000,000	114(39%)
Gray	3,500,000,000	121(25%)
Sinclair	3,100,000,000	79(23%)
Tegna	3,100,000,000	52(32%)
NBC	3,100,000,000	30(20%)
Fox	2,800,000,000	18(26%)
CBS	2,600,000,000	18(24%)
ABC	1,700,000,000	8(20%)
Scripps	1,700,000,000	74(39%)
Hearst	1,600,000,000	27(14%)
^{1} Data as of August 2025.; ^{2} Not including stations owned by shell companies, e.g., Mission Broadcasting.; ^{3} Ownership cap percentage is calculated with the UHF discount by the FCC. As a result of the discount, this number is in fact effectively higher.

On August 19, 2025, Tegna agreed to be acquired by Nexstar for $22 per share, valued at $6.2 billion, expanding Nexstar's reach to 80 percent of television households. (Note: Though the reach not factoring in the UHF discount exceeded 80 percent, for regulatory purposes it was calculated at 54.5 percent.) Completion was contingent on shareholder and regulatory approval, including a proposed loosening of ownership caps for broadcast television stations; the FCC had recently launched a public comment period on changes to the caps, which Nexstar CEO Perry Sook had long opposed. In the markets where this would create a duopoly, Sook stated that Nexstar did not plan to consolidate local station operations such as news departments, comparing it to cities that have multiple newspapers "operating off the same printing press". The NAB called for a full repeal of the ownership cap to complete the deal, claiming it was the only way local television could remain competitive against Big Tech giants like Amazon, Alphabet Inc. (Google and YouTube), and Meta. Multiple studies and industrial analysis have shown a declining number of viewers for local television, particularly in younger demographics, along with an overall decline in trust in news organizations.

Three days after the Nexstar–Tegna deal was announced, conservative media company Newsmax and CEO Christopher Ruddy announced their opposition to the deal, in part because the deal also would benefit NewsNation, regarded as a direct competitor to Newsmax TV. Ruddy said in a statement to the FCC, "[t]he only thing the [FCC] will get if it alters the national television multiple ownership limit is a permanent injunction". Ruddy previously opposed Sinclair's failed purchase of Tribune and the reinstatement of the UHF discount under Ajit Pai that helped enable it. One America News Network president Charles P. Herring also tweeted opposition to the deal and any changes to the ownership cap, arguing it would stifle independent and diverse views, encourage further retransmission disputes, and would be rejected by Congress. Ruddy's lobbying was seen as a potential factor for the deal's prospects given his longstanding association and friendship with Trump.

During a September 17, 2025, interview with Carr by YouTuber/conservative pundit Benny Johnson, Carr threatened punitive action against ABC, its owned-stations, and affiliates following remarks made by Jimmy Kimmel after the assassination of Charlie Kirk. Several hours later, Nexstar and Sinclair jointly announced all of their ABC-affiliated stations would preempt Jimmy Kimmel Live!, in turn forcing ABC to suspend production on Jimmy Kimmel Live! altogether. Nexstar president of broadcasting Andrew Alford claimed the pre-emption was intended to "let cooler heads prevail" but was seen by industry insiders and Democrats as solely meant to earn Carr's blessing on the Tegna deal. Nexstar and Sinclair stations continued to preempt Jimmy Kimmel Live! for several days after ABC resumed production on the show.

I think it's a false choice. People assume that the status quo, nothing will change. If we maintain the status quo, newsrooms will close. And I don't close newsrooms. I just move the address and move them into one building, so I pay to heat and cool one facility. I may have one administrative staff, you know, one technical support staff, with two different studios, two sets of reporters, two anchors.

— Perry Sook, Nexstar president/CEO, on if diversity of viewpoints are possible owning two or more "Big Four" affiliates in a market with the Tegna merger

On November 18, 2025, the sale was approved by Tegna's shareholders. It was filed with the FCC on November 19; in the paperwork, Nexstar sought waivers on all conflict stations in the event the ownership cap was not modified or repealed and unlike most documents and filings of its type, directly appealed to Trump and Carr. That same day, Ruddy decried the potential elimination of the ownership cap in a Newsmax TV editorial, saying, "Reagan understood if you have left-wing networks ... or groups like Nexstar today controlling every local station ... Republicans would have little chance to win in state and federal elections." Trump linked to the Newsmax piece in a November 24, 2025, post on Truth Social, agreeing it would enable "radical left ... fake news networks". In reply, Sook claimed changes to ownership rules would be "the best way to disrupt [the Big Four networks'] monopolistic power" and "ensure that local communities benefit from an array of fact-based local journalism—the anti-fake news—for years to come." The company also spent $3.2 million on lobbying government officials in 2025 per OpenSecrets, about 10 times more than what Nexstar spent per year for such efforts between 2018 and 2023. During the first quarter of 2026, Nexstar spent $1.14 million on lobbying, a company record.

Massachusetts Sen. Elizabeth Warren, a Democrat, wrote to the FCC and Gail Slater, head of the U.S. Justice Department's (DOJ) Antitrust Division on December 15, 2025, requesting further scrutiny on the Nexstar–Tegna merger from both agencies. Warren wrote that the merger, besides violating existing ownership regulations, would "create a media giant that would likely raise prices, drive layoffs, and reduce independent news coverage". The letter was co-signed by Maryland Sen. Chris Van Hollen and Nevada Sen. Jacky Rosen, along with Representatives Summer Lee, Maxwell Frost and Doris Matsui, all Democrats. Newsmax filed a petition to deny with the FCC against the merger on December 31, saying it would create "an unprecedented and dangerous consolidation within the broadcast TV industry... This merger is no better than others the FCC has already blocked." New York Rep. Elise Stefanik, a Republican, also wrote to the FCC opposing the merger and to any changes to the ownership cap. Several conservative pundits and activists supported the merger, including Laura Loomer, Sean Spicer and Mike Davis.

=== Trump endorsement ===
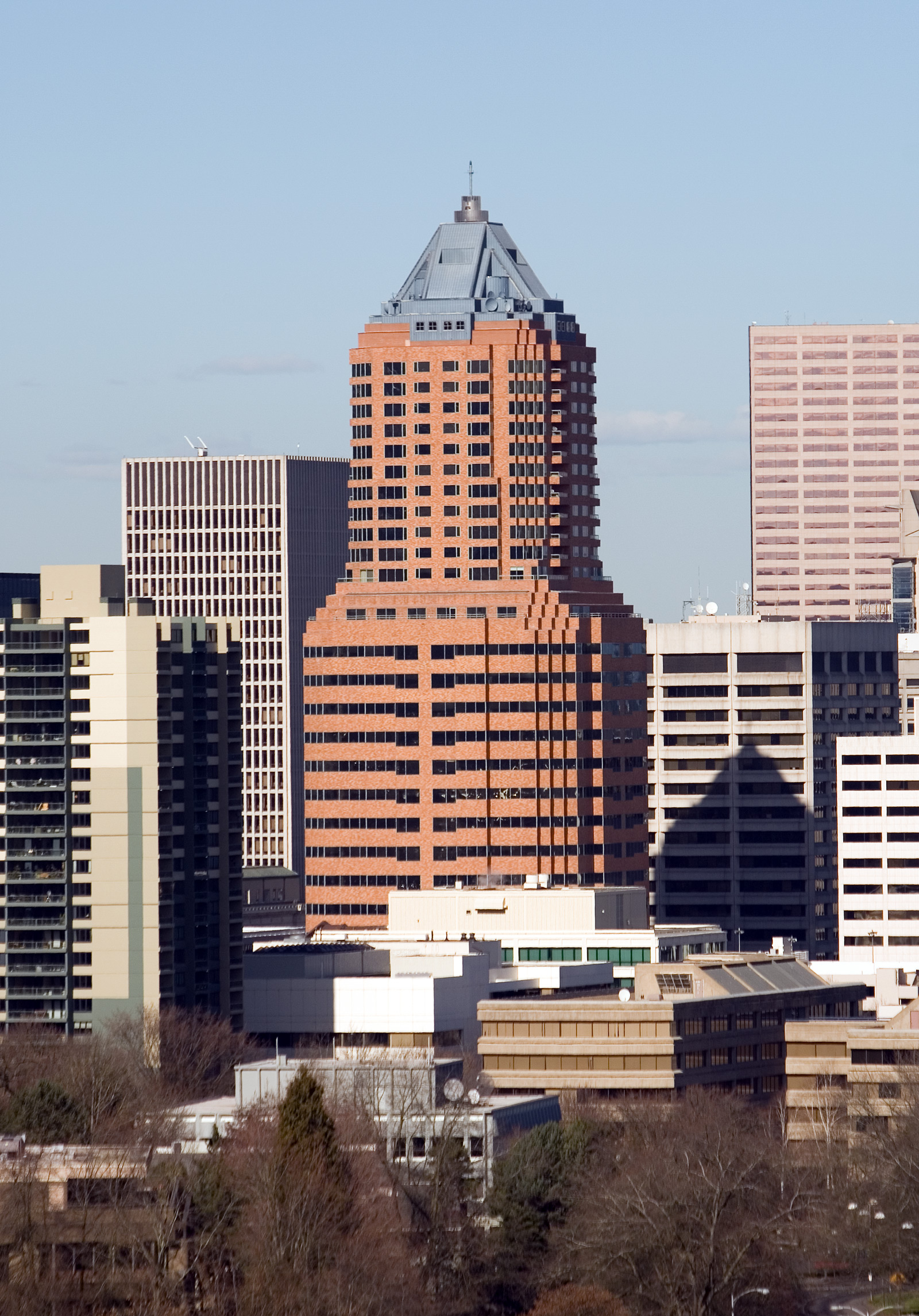
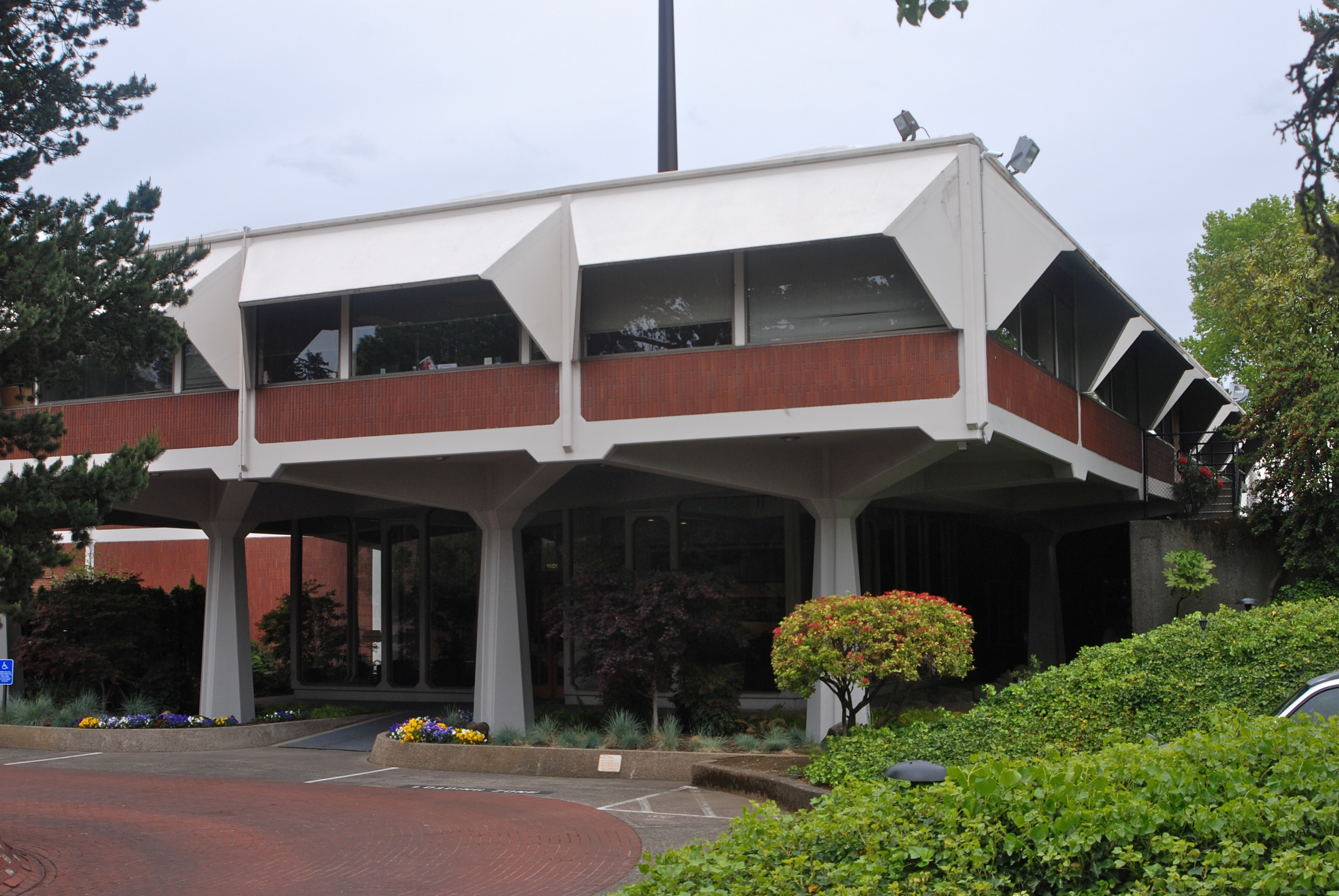
Studios of KOIN (Nexstar) and KGW (Tegna) in Portland, Oregon, one of 35 markets where the companies overlap

After having initially made statements in opposition, Trump endorsed the merger on February 7, 2026, arguing it would enable more competition against what he denounced as "fake news national TV networks". Carr tweeted in reply that Trump was "exactly right" and "[l]et's get [the Nexstar–Tegna deal] done and bring real competition to [the networks]." The endorsement came after various political groups took out television advertisements in the Washington, D.C. market supporting and opposing the merger. Ads from the group "Keeping News Local" (part of the Building America's Future group backed by Elon Musk) praised Trump for having "defeated the fake news monopolies" and said the merger was "crucial for MAGA to survive". Prior to the endorsement, Ruddy said, "I think, at the end of the day, Trump makes up his own mind. I'm not sure he's going to be influenced by an ad campaign". Newsmax issued a statement saying the merger would result in "dangerous consolidation that will limit competition, harm conservative voices and dramatically increase consumer cable bills." By February 18, Carr told reporters that he supported the merger and "we're going to be moving forward".

Trump's endorsement came days before a Senate Commerce Committee hearing over the 39 percent ownership cap and proposed deregulation, in which Ruddy testified alongside NAB president Chris LeGeyt, former FCC commissioner Michael O'Rielly (who opposed changes to the cap without congressional approval), and Rebuild Local News president Steven Waldman. Ruddy testified that Nexstar used their "anticompetitive" market scale to pressure pay TV to charge Newsmax TV at higher rates, while offering NewsNation at a discount. Texas Sen. Ted Cruz, chair of the committee, remarked, "... current media ownership rules were written in a vastly different technological age ... Yet even in this fragmented landscape, the media's ability to shape national discourse remains powerful, making questions about market concentration as important as ever".

Nexstar conducted a round of layoffs on February 25, 2026, at WGN-TV in Chicago, WPIX in New York City, and KTLA in Los Angeles that affected on-air talent, most notably Dean Richards, Chris Boden, Lu Parker and Craig Treadway. Weeks earlier, WGN-TV dismissed multiple copywriters in the news department. Concurrently, Nexstar fired approximately 400 creative services staff in favor of a hub model; this followed the replacement of voiceover artists across the group in favor of talent from agency SpotVoice. The Tegna merger and assumption of Tegna's debt were cited as a reason for the downsizing. SAG-AFTRA president Sean Astin condemned the WGN-WPIX-KTLA firings, which targeted tenured and union staff, as "eroding the resources and talent that local communities rely on for trusted news" and "highlight[ing] the risks of media consolidation".

Gail Slater resigned as head of the DOJ's Antitrust Division on February 12, 2026. Douglas Farrar, a former assistant to former Federal Trade Commission chair Lina Khan, viewed Slater's departure as an indication the DOJ "basically decided to decapitate the Antitrust Division" and would not scrutinize or challenge any mergers going forward. At a Morgan Stanley investor conference on March 4, Perry Sook told attendees Nexstar was "highly engaged" in talks with the FCC and DOJ and provided around two million documents to the DOJ. Sook claimed that Trump's endorsement "brought focus" on the transaction and its benefits. The following day, NewsNation's social media accounts posted a promo showing Trump press secretary Karoline Leavitt verbally confronting CNN reporter Kaitlan Collins with the text, "Think you're having a bad day? At least you're not CNN. No noise. No agenda. Asking the right questions for all Americans, on NewsNation." The promo was criticized as only existing to win the Trump administration's approval for the merger. Nexstar had previously hired Fox News pundit Katie Pavlich in late December 2025 for a primetime show on NewsNation, a move also seen as intending to win support from Trump.

=== Regulatory approval process ===
On March 18, 2026, the state of California alongside seven other states filed an antitrust lawsuit in the U.S. District Court for the Eastern District of California to block the merger, with the Attorney General Rob Bonta arguing that it would cause "irreparable harm to local news and consumers who rely on their reporting as a critical source of information." During a meet and confer call on March 10, 2026, California's legal counsel advised Nexstar's legal counsel to sign an agreement pledging not to close the Tegna transaction until after the state completed its overview, which Nexstar declined. The other states joining California were:

- Connecticut, represented by Attorney General William Tong
- Colorado, represented by Attorney General Phil Weiser
- Illinois, represented by Attorney General Kwame Raoul
- New York, represented by Attorney General Letitia James
- North Carolina, represented by Attorney General Jeff Jackson
- Oregon, represented by Attorney General Dan Rayfield
- Virginia, represented by Attorney General Jay Jones

DirecTV, who filed a petition to deny with the FCC against the merger, also filed an antitrust suit within the same district court as the former the following day. Bonta previously announced California would do a "vigorous" inquiry into Paramount Skydance's proposed purchase of Warner Bros. Discovery over potential antitrust violations, even with the DOJ indicating it would defer any scrutiny. The American Prospect regarded Bonta as "picking up the slack for a corrupt and inert law enforcement apparatus in Washington".

Despite the aforementioned antitrust lawsuits, the sale was approved by the DOJ and the FCC on March 19, 2026; the FCC's approval came through a waiver of the 39 percent ownership cap via the Media Bureau, and did not entail a vote of the commissioners. Nexstar agreed to divest six overlap stations within two years (Note: These stations are WTHR, Indianapolis; WAVY-TV, Portsmouth, Virginia; KNWA-TV, Rogers, Arkansas; KTVD, Denver; WCTX, New Haven, Connecticut; and WUPL, Slidell, Louisiana.) and pledged to the FCC "commitments that go to affordability and localism". Carr, who previously stated his intent to loosen the 39 percent ownership cap on a "case-by-case basis", issued the waivers as he believed the cap to be overbroad and outdated. Carr also claimed Nexstar would only own "less than 15 percent of television stations" and that the FCC was "mindful of the media marketplace that [exists] today, not the one from decades past". The approvals were issued at 6:50 p.m. EDT; fifteen minutes later, at 7:05 p.m., Nexstar announced the transaction was already completed. Sook thanked Trump, Carr and the DOJ "... for recognizing the dynamic forces shaping the media landscape and enabling this transaction to move forward."

In San Diego, Nexstar transferred The CW affiliation from a subchannel of Tegna station KFMB-TV to Nexstar-owned KUSI-TV immediately after the sale closed. Tegna stations were told to immediately air copyright endcaps bearing the Nexstar logo at the end of newscasts. Trading of Tegna common stock was suspended from the New York Stock Exchange the following day, and all members of Tegna's board of directors were dismissed. Former Tegna chief executive Mike Steib was compensated $22.6 million.

=== Responses ===
Anna M. Gomez, the lone FCC Democratic commissioner, called the merger "unlawful" and assailed the approval for being "... behind closed doors with no open process, no full Commission vote, and no transparency for the consumers and communities who will bear the consequences." Gigi Sohn, an FCC commissioner nominee under President Joe Biden, tweeted, "The fix was in at the [FCC and DOJ] to approve the massive Nexstar–TEGNA deal. People need to know how abnormal and illegal the process was." Sen. Ted Cruz, who previously called Carr a "mafioso" over his threats against Kimmel and ABC, criticized the usage of the Media Bureau to administer the waiver, saying approval needed to go to a public vote. Cruz and Sen. Maria Cantwell, ranking member of the Senate Commerce Committee, requested Carr explain his actions, saying even if there were a vote on the deal, "... the Commission has already approved the transaction on delegated authority, effectively determining the outcome".

Ohio Attorney General Dave Yost, a Republican, tweeted on April 8 his "deep reservations" about the merger, citing the potential impacts in Cleveland and Columbus, Ohio, respectively. Yost noted, "[t]he consolidation of ownership of TV stations means fewer ways for news to flow to the people, and greater corporate control." Reporters Without Borders called the merger approval "a disaster for American press freedom" and stated, "The only winners in this deal are the boards of directors of these two companies and Trump himself". The Media and Democracy Project, alongside former FCC chair Alfred C. Sikes, former commissioner Ervin Duggan, onetime Fox executive Preston Padden and conservative commentator Bill Kristol, criticized the merger's approval through an inside agency as an intentional "hide-the-ball" scheme, with Carr catering solely to Trump. (Note: See WTXF-TV § 2023 license renewal objections.) Sikes also claimed Carr "doesn't do anything by way of an appealable action" despite weaponizing the FCC at the expense of free speech.

California governor Gavin Newsom publicly called Carr a "disgrace" for approving the deal and for "[wanting] Dear Leader [Trump] to have better coverage, or he is not going to approve or renew broadcast licenses ... [and] who celebrated Nexstar for trying to censor Jimmy Kimmel ... the kind of behavior that makes Putin blush." Carr rebutted Newsom as "simply doing the bidding of his liberal Hollywood donors—the billionaires in media who have no interest in the FCC holding them accountable to their statutory public interest obligations". In reply, Newsom said Carr "wants to censor the press" and "[y]ou're not a watchdog. You're a thin-skinned lapdog."

== Federal lawsuit ==
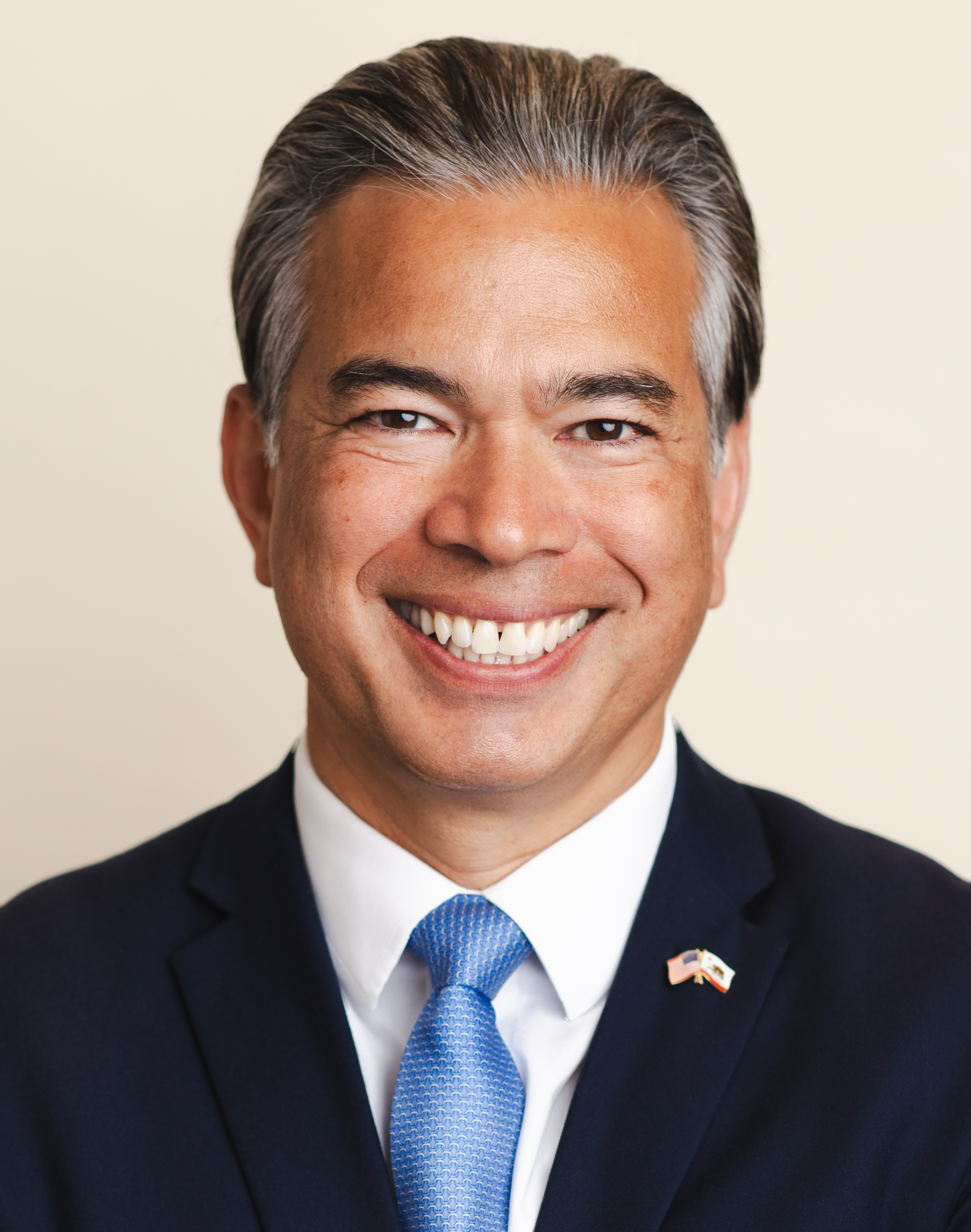
California Attorney General Rob Bonta

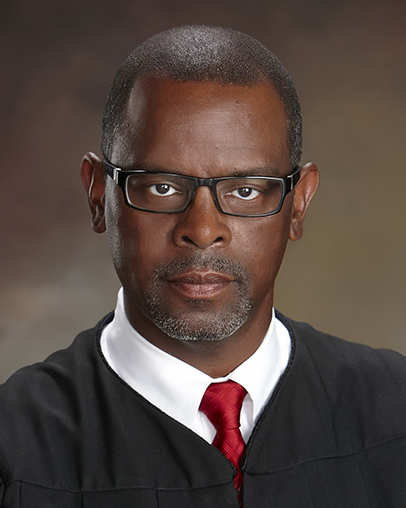
Eastern District of California Chief Federal Judge Troy Nunley

After Nexstar announced the Tegna merger had been completed, Rob Bonta tweeted, "Nexstar/Tegna is not a done deal. California will not let the parties merge without a fight." The following day, eight states (California, Colorado, Connecticut, Illinois, New York, North Carolina, Oregon, and Virginia) filed a lawsuit to block the merger and requested a temporary restraining order (TRO) in the same district court to prevent further integration while the lawsuits were pending. Phil Weiser announced the joint filing in a quote tweet reply to KUSA investigative reporter Marshall Zelinger, saying, "[t]his merger violates the law and would harm consumers, journalism, and our community. We are on the case." DirecTV filed a TRO request of their own in the same court, claiming the merger was a means to drive up pricing for consumers through retransmission consent disputes and arguing Nexstar had a "Consolidation Playbook" with the goal of gaining "scale" and "leverage" with "the ultimate aim of raising prices". Chief federal district judge Troy Nunley received both filings and placed them under review.

On March 23, Newsmax filed for a restraining order in the United States District Court for the District of Columbia alongside several pay TV advocacy groups in Pennsylvania, Washington, Indiana, Mississippi, Tennessee and Virginia, claiming the FCC acted improperly in administering the waivers, and was "flawed from stem to stern". The appeal also singled out the Media Bureau as "rogue ... running roughshod over statutory limits", Trump's social media post as helping spur approval in four months instead of the FCC's 180-day minimum or a typical 200-to-400-day timeline, and that Nexstar "apparently worked hand-in-glove with the FCC to frustrate judicial review". The Conservative Political Action Conference's Center for Regulatory Freedom, the National Religious Broadcasters, and the Zionist Organization of America each filed amicus briefs in support of Newsmax. A separate challenge to the FCC waivers led by Democracy Forward on behalf of Free Press, the Communications Workers of America, Public Knowledge, and the United Church of Christ's Media Justice Ministry was also filed in the D.C. District Court.

A town hall meeting for employees of both companies took place on March 26, 2026, with Sook hosting from the studios of WFAA in Dallas (Nexstar is headquartered in Irving, Texas). During the meeting, Sook said NewsNation would become "... ultimately the exclusive wire service and national news partner for all of our local news operations", replacing services provided by ABC, CBS, NBC, Fox and CNN (the latter Tegna had an extensive contract with) when their contracts expired. The disaffiliations were included in paperwork Nexstar filed with the FCC. Sook also claimed Nexstar would be "dedicated to preserving the independence of our local newsrooms at a time when national news organizations dictate the news agenda". According to FTVLive's Scott Jones, Sook said all Tegna emails were integrated into Nexstar's servers and employees between the two companies were now urged to correspond with each other. Tegna employees voiced concern to Bloomberg News of degradation in their newscasts with NewsNation as the sole wire service, creating a negative impact on viewership and impairing credibility.

=== Temporary restraining order ===
On March 28, 2026, Nunley issued a 14-day TRO barring Nexstar from any further integration of Tegna assets and personnel and ordering it to continue operating Tegna as a separate company. Nunley concluded "a likelihood of success on the merits" was established by DirecTV, and that "irreparable harm" would result if integration of Tegna into Nexstar continued, the two largest factors when issuing a TRO. Nunley also said Nexstar and Tegna "do not contest [that] this merger will increase Nexstar's bargaining leverage to extract higher fees". Nexstar's stock price fell by over 13 percent the following Monday, while Blair Levin said the TRO showed Nexstar was "likely to be stuck in deal purgatory for the next several years" as Nexstar shareholders held all the risk but Tegna shareholders "have been paid off".

Newsmax CEO Christopher Ruddy praised the TRO, saying, "the federal court took the unusual step of stopping this merger because Brendan Carr rubber-stamped the most massive TV consolidation in history using a kangaroo process." TVNewsCheck editor Harry Jessell, an advocate of the merger, decried the TRO as "absolutely absurd that any court believes it must step in to protect pay TV operators that have long ago consolidated into giants" while conceding Sook's connections to Carr and Trump to get approval constituted a quid pro quo and were "worrisome". Over the next few days, the Tegna name was restored on copyright notices on newscasts, websites and mobile apps, along with outdoor signage. Nexstar requested the easing of portions of the TRO, claiming the TRO could not be implemented due to the deal having already closed; the attorneys general replied, "if Defendants find the requested relief truly unworkable, the Court should rescind the merger until the merits are decided at trial".

A hearing in the case was held on April 7, during which DirecTV's attorney claimed that the merger would increase Nexstar's rate leverage over DirecTV by threatening blackouts including more Big Four stations in a given area. Nexstar's lawyers claimed the company had increased local programming and that the allegation that newsrooms would be shuttered was unsubstantiated. It also emerged that Nexstar asked the plaintiffs to post a bond of $150 million to cover losses from delayed integration, though Nexstar claimed the amount was intended to be confidential. Observers indicated that Nunley was preparing to issue a preliminary injunction. Richard Greenfield of LightShed Partners believed that hearings and appeals on the matter after issuance could run into most of 2027 and put a damper on other merger activity in broadcasting.

=== Injunction and expanded attorneys general lawsuit ===
Nunley issued a preliminary injunction on April 17, 2026, barring integration, which took effect on April 21; the four-day window allowed Nexstar time to consider a widely expected appeal. While Nexstar had argued FCC approval was sufficient review of antitrust law, Nunley wrote, "The FCC was 'not given the power to decide antitrust issues' and FCC action 'was not intended to prevent enforcement of the antitrust laws in federal courts'". (Note: Nunley quoted the 1959 United States Supreme Court ruling, United States v. Radio Corporation of America.) Nunley rejected the bond request from Nexstar and set bond at a "nominal" $10,000. Nexstar promptly issued a statement saying it would appeal to the United States Court of Appeals for the Ninth Circuit. Bonta praised the ruling, saying, "the federal government may have thrown in the towel, but we'll keep fighting for consumers, for workers, for affordability, and for our local news." The D.C. District Court denied all emergency stay requests filed at their court on April 29, owing to the existing preliminary injunction.

Staff from the FCC's Media Bureau declined to comment on the ruling during the annual NAB Show in Las Vegas; Carr was not in attendance. In an interview with Deborah Norville during the NAB Show, Sook said "two or three companies" will eventually control all local television stations, saying "it's a matter of time". RadioInsight publisher Lance Venta noted a "growing belief" among NAB Show attendees that Carr could soon repeal all broadcast ownership caps and "completely creating a free-for-all for buyers to acquire as many stations as they'd like". Sook accused DirecTV of "a history of trying to weaken the companies it's trying to negotiate with" and criticized the attorneys general lawsuit as "all political ... appeal[ing] to a base in an election year" but conceded the appeal process "will play out over a series of months here". Weiser tweeted in reply, "it is easy for me to say this is all about protecting consumers from price hikes and lower quality broadcast and news programs. We'll see Nexstar in court."

On April 30, the plaintiff states filed an amended complaint and grew to 13, with the addition of Indiana, Kansas, Massachusetts, Pennsylvania, and Vermont—three of which have Republican attorneys general. Pennsylvania Attorney General Dave Sunday, a Republican, argued the merger's threat of higher subscription TV fees would push household budgets "closer to breaking". Kansas Attorney General Kris Kobach, a Republican, denounced the merger and said, "these aren't Republican or Democratic issues. They are American issues". The same day, a settlement was reached between Ohio Attorney General Dave Yost and Nexstar under which, if the injunction were to be lifted, Nexstar would maintain existing local program output and editorially independent news departments of their stations in Cleveland (WJW and WKYC) and Columbus (WBNS-TV and WCMH-TV) through 2030. This agreement excluded technical staff and multimedia journalists employed by those stations.

In a company statement, Nexstar criticized the amended state attorneys general lawsuit as "misguided" and "strangling local journalism", saying, "the alternative to this deal is not more independently owned outlets, it's the demise of your local broadcast station". During Sinclair's quarterly earnings call, CEO Chris Ripley said the Nexstar-Tegna deal was "tremendously helpful to the industry" and the attorneys general lawsuit was "very flimsy" but acknowledged the optics of the merger "didn't look great".

Plaintiffs presented an objection in July 2026 to Nexstar principals serving on Tegna's board. They argued that this action ran afoul of antitrust law and the conditions of the preliminary injunction. Nunley issued an order in the plaintiffs' favor on August 5, clarifying that Nexstar officers and directors cannot serve on Tegna's board and admonishing the company for its "brazen" conduct in naming them without court approval or notification.

Nexstar's appeal of the preliminary injunction was heard by the Ninth Circuit on November 17. Attorneys for Nexstar said the injunction should be narrowed to apply only to the 31 Big Four stations in overlap markets, a proposition rejected by DirecTV and states lawyers who noted that the 31 stations would be a "hypothetical entity" and not the competition that existed pre-merger.

== Overlapping holdings ==
At the time of the merger, each of Nexstar and Tegna owned or operated television stations in 35 markets across the United States. Stations with a Big Four affiliation (ABC, CBS, Fox, NBC) are noted. Low-power TV stations and translators are not listed.

Nexstar–Tegna overlap markets
Market	Nexstar stations	Tegna stations
Huntsville, Alabama	WHNT-TV (CBS), WHDF	WZDX (Fox)
Phoenix, Arizona	KAZT-TV†	KPNX and KNAZ-TV‡ (NBC)
Fayetteville–Fort Smith, Arkansas	KFTA-TV (Fox), KXNW, KNWA-TV‡ (NBC)	KFSM-TV (CBS)
Little Rock, Arkansas	KARK-TV (NBC), KARZ-TV; KLRT-TV† (Fox), KASN†	KTHV (CBS)
Sacramento, California	KTXL (Fox)	KXTV (ABC)
San Diego, California	KUSI-TV, KSWB-TV (Fox)	KFMB-TV (CBS)
Denver, Colorado	KWGN-TV, KDVR (Fox)	KUSA (NBC), KTVD
Hartford–New Haven, Connecticut	WTNH (ABC), WCTX	WCCT-TV, WTIC-TV (Fox)
Washington, D.C.	WDCW, WDVM-TV	WUSA (CBS)
Tampa, Florida	WFLA-TV (NBC), WTTA	WTSP (CBS)
Quad Cities, Illinois–Iowa	WHBF-TV (CBS), KGCW; KLJB† (Fox)	WQAD-TV (ABC)
Indianapolis, Indiana	WTTV (CBS), WXIN (Fox)	WTHR (NBC)
Des Moines, Iowa	WHO-DT (NBC)	WOI-DT (ABC), KCWI-TV
New Orleans, Louisiana	WGNO (ABC), WNOL-TV	WWL-TV (CBS), WUPL
Grand Rapids, Michigan	WOOD-TV (NBC), WOTV (ABC)	WZZM (ABC)
St. Louis, Missouri	KTVI (Fox), KPLR-TV	KSDK (NBC)
Buffalo, New York	WIVB-TV (CBS), WNLO	WGRZ (NBC)
Charlotte, North Carolina	WJZY (Fox), WMYT-TV	WCNC-TV (NBC)
Greensboro, North Carolina	WGHP (Fox)	WFMY-TV (CBS)
Cleveland, Ohio	WJW (Fox), WBNX-TV	WKYC (NBC)
Columbus, Ohio	WCMH-TV (NBC)	WBNS-TV (CBS)
Portland, Oregon	KOIN (CBS), KRCW-TV	KGW (NBC)
Harrisburg, Pennsylvania	WHTM-TV (ABC)	WPMT (Fox)
Scranton–Wilkes-Barre, Pennsylvania	WBRE-TV (NBC); WYOU† (CBS)	WNEP-TV (ABC)
Knoxville, Tennessee	WATE-TV (ABC)	WBIR-TV (NBC)
Memphis, Tennessee	WREG-TV (CBS)	WATN-TV (ABC), WLMT
Abilene, Texas	KTAB-TV (CBS); KRBC-TV† (NBC)	KXVA (Fox)
Austin, Texas	KXAN-TV (NBC), KBVO‡; KNVA†	KVUE (ABC)
Dallas, Texas	KDAF	WFAA (ABC), KFAA-TV
Houston, Texas	KIAH	KHOU (CBS), KTBU
Midland–Odessa, Texas	KMID (ABC); KPEJ-TV† (Fox)	KWES-TV (NBC)
San Angelo, Texas	KLST (CBS); KSAN-TV† (NBC)	KIDY (Fox)
Tyler, Texas	KETK-TV (NBC); KFXK-TV† (Fox)	KYTX (CBS)
Waco–Bryan, Texas	KWKT-TV (Fox); KYLE-TV‡	KCEN-TV (NBC)
Hampton Roads, Virginia	WAVY-TV (NBC), WVBT (Fox)	WVEC (ABC)

† Station is operated by Nexstar on behalf of another owner.
‡ Satellite station. KNWA-TV was authorized as a satellite of KFTA-TV but separated main channel programming in 2006. KBVO was authorized as a satellite of KXAN-TV but separated main channel programming in 2009. KYLE was authorized as a satellite of KWKT-TV but separated main channel programming in 2015.
