= CBS 32 =

CBS 32 may refer to one of the following television stations in the United States:

== Current ==
- KTAB-TV in Abilene, Texas
- WLKY in Louisville, Kentucky

== Former ==
- WNEG-TV (now WGTA) in Toccoa, Georgia (1995 to 2008)
- W22FA-D in Mayaguez, Puerto Rico (2019 to 2020)
  - Was a translator of WSEE-TV in Erie, Pennsylvania
