= Servo =

Servo may refer to:

== Mechanisms ==
- Servomechanism, or servo, a device used to provide control of a desired operation through the use of feedback
  - AI servo ("artificial intelligence servo"), an autofocus mode in Canon SLR cameras, and in other brands such as Nikon, Sony, and Pentax under the name "continuous focus" (AF-C)
  - Electrohydraulic servo valve, an electrically operated valve that controls how hydraulic fluid is ported to an actuator
  - Servo drive, a special electronic amplifier used to power electric servomechanisms
  - Servomotor, a rotary actuator that allows for precise control of angular position
  - Servo (radio control), a small, cheap, mass-produced actuator used for radio control and small robotics
    - Servo bandwidth, the maximum trackable sinusoidal frequency of an amplitude
    - Servo control, the use of pulse width modulation to remotely control servos
- Servo tab, a small hinged device installed on an aircraft control surface to assist the movement of the control surface

== Media ==
=== Music ===
- "Servo", a song by The Brian Jonestown Massacre from the album Give It Back!

=== Publications ===
- SERVO Magazine, a monthly robotics publication

=== Television ===
- Sam "Servo" Collins, a fictional character from the television series, Superhuman Samurai Syber-Squad
- Tom Servo, a robot from the comedy television series, Mystery Science Theater 3000
- Servo pen, a fictitious multipurpose tool used by Gary Seven in the Star Trek episode "Assignment: Earth"

=== Video games ===
- Servo, a non-playable character from the computer game The Sims: Livin' Large
- Servo, a playable character from the expansion pack The Sims 2: Open for Business

== People ==
- Marty Servo (1919–1969), the former world welterweight boxing champion
- Jennifer Servo (1979–2002), a former news reporter

== Other uses ==
- Servo (software), an experimental web browser engine originally developed by Mozilla
- Servo Robot Group, a digital vision and sensing system company
- Pasporta Servo, a hospitality service for Esperantists
- Servo, Australian slang for a service station
- Servotronic, speed-dependent power steering
