= Servetto =

Servetto is a surname. Notable people with the surname include:

- Nicolás Servetto (born 1996), Argentine professional footballer
- Mara Servetto (born 1957), Italian architect and designer

== See also ==
- Servo (disambiguation)
- Servette (disambiguation)
