= KIDZ-LD =

Television station in Abilene, Texas (1992–2018)

Defunct; served as translator of KXVA

Abilene, Texas; United States
- Channels: Digital: 42 (UHF); Virtual: 42

Programming
- Affiliations: Fox (1992–2001, 2011–2018); UPN (secondary 1995–2001, primary 2001–2006); Pax TV/i (secondary, 2001–2006); MyNetworkTV (analog/LD1 2006–2011, LD2 2011–2018)

Ownership
- Owner: Tegna Inc.; (LSB Broadcasting, Inc.)

History
- Founded: October 30, 1991
- First air date: May 26, 1992
- Last air date: January 25, 2018; (25 years, 244 days); (license canceled July 25, 2018)
- Former call signs: K54DT (1991–1996); KIDZ-LP (1996–2011); KIDZ-CD (2011–2012)
- Call sign meaning: Derived from KIDY, sister station in San Angelo

Technical information
- Facility ID: 58561
- Class: LD
- ERP: 12 kW
- HAAT: 77.8 m (255 ft)
- Transmitter coordinates: 32°26′38.5″N 99°44′5.3″W

KIDZ-LD (channel 42) was a low-power television station in Abilene, Texas, United States. It served as a translator of Fox affiliate KXVA (channel 15) which is owned by Tegna Inc. KIDZ-LD's transmitter was located at KXVA's studios in the Bank of America Building on Chestnut Street in downtown Abilene; master control and some internal operations for KXVA and KIDZ-LD were based at the facilities of sister station and fellow Fox affiliate KIDY on South Chadbourne Street in San Angelo.

== History ==
On October 30, 1991, the Federal Communications Commission (FCC) granted an original construction permit to Sage Broadcasting Corporation to build low-power television station K54DT, to serve Abilene, Texas on UHF channel 54. The station was quickly built and came on air on May 26, 1992, as Abilene's first full-time Fox affiliate. When UPN launched in 1995, K54DT began carrying select programs from that network also, including Star Trek: Voyager. In June 1996, after the FCC began to allow low-power stations to use four-letter callsigns, the station took call letters KIDZ-LP. KIDZ-LP continued to carry both Fox and UPN programming until January 2001, when Sage Broadcasting launched KXVA as a full-service Fox affiliate. KIDZ-LP then became a primary UPN affiliate, with Pax TV as a secondary affiliation. The station received permission to move to UHF channel 42 in December 2001, and as part of the move, upgraded their license to Class A on February 27, 2002. They completed the move to the new channel in late 2004, and licensed the new facilities on December 22, 2004.

In January 2006, UPN and The WB announced that each network would cease operations in September 2006 and that in its place would be a new network, later named The CW. A month later, unable to secure the CW affiliation for their largest-market stations, News Corporation, the parent company of Fox, announced that it would form its own network, called MyNetworkTV, and stations that had been affiliated with UPN or The WB needed to decide which of the two networks to affiliate with, or to go independent. On April 18, 2006, KIDZ-LP announced that it would affiliate with MyNetworkTV. The choice seemed natural, as Sage Broadcasting Corporation had had a working relationship with Fox in Abilene for nearly 15 years. On September 5, 2006, MyNetworkTV launched, and KIDZ-LP became a MyNetworkTV affiliate.

On September 27, 2012, Bayou City Broadcasting announced an agreement to sell KIDZ-CD and its seven other television stations to London Broadcasting Company (the sale price initially was not disclosed). The sale marks a temporary exit from the broadcasting industry for the company's owner DuJuan McCoy, who plans on refocusing his company to acquire major network affiliates in mid-sized markets larger than San Angelo and Abilene. The FCC granted its approval of the sale on November 14. The sale was completed on December 31.

On October 26, 2012, the station surrendered its Class A status to the FCC, and changed its call sign to KIDZ-LD. The station went silent on January 25, 2018, and its license was canceled six months later on July 25.

== Digital television ==
Low-power stations were exempt from the June 12, 2009 mandatory switch-off of full-power analog television stations in the United States, therefore KIDZ-LP was unaffected. When the FCC allowed low-power stations to apply for digital companion channels, so that low-power stations could get their digital operations up and running, neither KIDZ-LP nor its repeaters submitted applications; but, began digital broadcasting as a simulcast of KXVA in 2011.

== Sports programming ==
KIDZ-LD was also Abilene's 2006–07 home of the NBA's Dallas Mavericks, broadcasting 14 of the team's games.
