= KXVA =

Television station in Abilene, Texas

- Abilene, Texas; United States
- Channels: Digital: 15 (UHF); Virtual: 15
- Branding: Fox West Texas; MyTV Abilene (15.2)

Programming
- Affiliations: 15.1: Fox; 15.2: Independent with MyNetworkTV; for others, see § Subchannels

Ownership
- Owner: Tegna Inc., a subsidiary of Nexstar Media Group; (LSB Broadcasting, Inc.)
- Sister stations: Nexstar: KTAB-TV, KRBC-TV

History
- Founded: June 29, 2000
- First air date: January 18, 2001
- Former channel numbers: Analog: 15 (UHF, 2001–2009)
- Call sign meaning: "XV Abilene", with the Roman numeral for 15

Technical information
- Licensing authority: FCC
- Facility ID: 62293
- ERP: 31 kW
- HAAT: 299 m (981 ft)
- Transmitter coordinates: 32°16′31.6″N 99°35′24.6″W
- Translator(s): see § Translators

Links
- Public license information: Public file; LMS
- Website: www.myfoxzone.com

KXVA (channel 15) is a television station in Abilene, Texas, United States, affiliated with Fox and MyNetworkTV. It is owned by the Tegna subsidiary of Nexstar Media Group; Nexstar also owns CBS/Telemundo affiliate KTAB-TV (channel 32) and operates NBC affiliate KRBC-TV (channel 9). KXVA broadcasts from a transmitter located in rural southwestern Callahan County. Its operations and local productions are housed at sister station and fellow Fox affiliate KIDY in San Angelo; the two stations are commonly branded as "Fox West Texas" and largely simulcast the same programming, including local newscasts covering both areas.

== History ==
In 1992, Sage Broadcasting Company established K54DT "KDT" (call letters changed to KIDZ-LP in 1996), a translator of KIDY, to serve San Angelo. However, when the NFL came to Fox in 1994, its insufficient coverage meant that Fox sold the rights to air its football package to ABC affiliate KTXS. The wife of one of KIDY's owners, doing business as Star Broadcasting, then filed in 1995 to build a station on channel 15. Four applications were received in total for channel 15, but because the Telecommunications Act of 1996 and subsequent amendments shifted all new commercial broadcast stations to being awarded in auctions, the four parties then were ordered to bid on the allotment. That never came to pass, as the Federal Communications Commission (FCC) approved a settlement agreement clearing the way for the Star Broadcasting application in 1999.

A final construction permit for channel 15 was issued on June 15, 2000, but the call letters KXVA had already been announced, as had been the programming plan: to move Fox to the new full-power station and convert the low-power outlet into a UPN affiliate. The new station's startup was pushed back from a planned September or October 2000 launch due to equipment delays and bad weather affecting the construction of the tower to January 18, 2001. It was the first new full-power TV station in Abilene since KTAB-TV (channel 32) began in October 1979.

In 2008, the station was purchased by Bayou City Broadcasting in a group deal for approximately $3 million. On September 27, 2012, Bayou City Broadcasting announced an agreement to sell KXVA and its seven other television stations to the Dallas-based London Broadcasting Company (the sale price initially was not disclosed). The sale marked a temporary exit from the broadcasting industry for the company's owner DuJuan McCoy, who planned on refocusing his company to acquire major network affiliates in mid-sized markets larger than San Angelo and Abilene. The FCC granted its approval of the sale on November 14; the sale was completed on December 31.

On May 14, 2014, the Gannett Company announced that it would acquire KIDY, KXVA, and four other London Broadcasting stations for $215 million; Gannett CEO Gracia Martore touted that the acquisition would give the company a presence in several fast-growing markets and opportunities for local advertisers to leverage its digital marketing platform. The sale was completed on July 8. 13 months later, on June 29, 2015, the Gannett Company split in two, with one side specializing in print media and the other side specializing in broadcast and digital media. KXVA was retained by the latter company, named Tegna.

Nexstar Media Group, owner of KTAB-TV and operator of KRBC-TV (channel 9) in Abilene, acquired Tegna in a deal announced in August 2025 and completed on March 19, 2026. A temporary restraining order issued one week later by the U.S. District Court for the Eastern District of California, later escalated to a preliminary injunction, has prevented KXVA from being integrated into KTAB and KRBC.

== News operation ==
In 2009, KIDY and KXVA began airing simulcasts of the 9 p.m. newscast of KABB, the Fox affiliate in San Antonio, which were augmented in 2010 with a simulcast of KABB's morning newscast. In addition to local news headline updates aired during these programs, KXVA provided hourly local news updates weekdays from 9 a.m. to 7 p.m., with headlines and news information provided by the Abilene Reporter News newspaper.

On January 20, 2014, KXVA debuted Fox News First at Nine, a half-hour 9 p.m. newscast produced from San Angelo, as part of the launch of local news for KXVA and KIDY. The KABB morning news simulcast has been replaced by other programming including The Texas Daily and The Broadcast, news and interview programs produced by its Dallas then-sister station KTXD-TV.

On August 2, 2016, KXVA re-launched its news operation, moving its 6:30 p.m. news to 6 p.m. and moving its prime time newscast to 10 p.m., and introducing a new studio, standalone website, and on-air branding as "Fox 15". By 2019, the two stations had recombined their news operation and branding as Fox West Texas with a half-hour 6 p.m. newscast and an hour-long 9 p.m. newscast. A shared morning show, Wake Up West Texas, aired on both stations until 2020.

== Technical information ==
=== Subchannels ===
The station's signal is multiplexed:

Subchannels of KXVA
Subchannel	Res.	Short name	Programming
15.1	720p	KXVA-DT	Fox
15.2	480i	KIDZ	Independent with MyNetworkTV
15.3	480i	COZI	Cozi TV
15.4	480i	QUEST	Quest
15.5	480i	Crime	True Crime Network
15.6	480i	OPEN	[Blank]
15.7	480i	GetTV	Great
15.8	480i	SHOP-LC	Shop LC

In 2011, KXVA added a second digital subchannel as a simulcast of KIDZ-LD. On January 25, 2018, KIDZ signed off and KXVA-DT2 became the sole MyNetworkTV affiliate for the Abilene market.

=== Analog-to-digital conversion ===
Because it was granted an original construction permit after the FCC finalized the digital television allotment plan on April 21, 1997, the station did not receive a companion channel for a digital television signal. KXVA shut down its analog signal, over UHF channel 15, on February 17, 2009, and "flash-cut" its digital signal into operation UHF channel 15.

=== Translators ===
KXVA's signal is relayed on the following translator stations:

- K34RK-D Albany
- K17PM-D Brownwood

There were two additional translators. KIDT-LD (channel 44) at Stamford closed in August 2020 to allow US Cellular to commence 600 MHz cellular service and never reopened on a new channel; the license was surrendered on July 8, 2021. KIDB-LD (channel 35) at Sweetwater closed in March 2022. On February 23, 2026, an FCC rule change required stations licensed as broadcast translators and not low-power TV stations, including the remaining two, to be assigned translator-type call signs. As a result, KIDV-LD became K34RK-D and KIDU-LD became K17PM-D.
