= KPAR =

KPAR may refer to:

- KPAR-LP, a low-power radio station (103.3 FM) licensed to Dickinson, North Dakota, United States
- KTXS-TV, a television station (channel 12 analog/20 digital) licensed to Sweetwater, Texas, United States, which held the call sign KPAR-TV from 1956 to 1966
- K_{PAR}, the diffuse attenuation coefficient (the rate of attenuation of irradiance) for photosynthetically active radiation
