= KIDY =

Television station in San Angelo, Texas

- San Angelo, Texas; United States
- Channels: Digital: 19 (UHF); Virtual: 6
- Branding: Fox West Texas; My San Angelo (6.2)

Programming
- Affiliations: 6.1: Fox; 6.2: Independent with MyNetworkTV; for others, see § Subchannels

Ownership
- Owner: Tegna Inc., a subsidiary of Nexstar Media Group; (LSB Broadcasting, Inc.)
- Sister stations: Nexstar: KLST, KSAN-TV

History
- First air date: May 12, 1984
- Former channel numbers: Analog: 6 (VHF, 1984–2009)
- Former affiliations: Independent (1984–1986)

Technical information
- Licensing authority: FCC
- Facility ID: 58560
- ERP: 3.7 kW
- HAAT: 132 m (433 ft)
- Transmitter coordinates: 31°35′22″N 100°31′1″W

Links
- Public license information: Public file; LMS
- Website: www.myfoxzone.com

KIDY (channel 6) is a television station in San Angelo, Texas, United States, affiliated with Fox and MyNetworkTV. The station is owned by the Tegna subsidiary of Nexstar Media Group; Nexstar also owns CBS affiliate KLST (channel 8) and operates NBC affiliate KSAN-TV (channel 3). KIDY's studios are located on South Chadbourne Street in San Angelo, and its transmitter is located in rural northwestern Tom Green County (east of Grape Creek). KIDY's programming and regional newscasts are rebroadcast by KXVA (channel 15) in Abilene.

Channel 6 was assigned to San Angelo in 1962, and two parties sought to build it: the San Angelo Independent School District and SRC, Inc. SRC won the right to build the station but abandoned the project in 1971 because it was blocked from obtaining an ABC affiliation; KTXS-TV of Sweetwater had been approved to build a translator to rebroadcast its ABC and local programs in San Angelo.

A decade later, Sage Broadcasting won a new channel 6 construction permit. Like SRC a decade earlier, it was unable to obtain a promised ABC affiliation, but unlike SRC, Sage was committed to building the station without a major network. KIDY went on the air as an independent station on May 12, 1984. It offered some local programming, including a local newscast, during the 1980s. KIDY added Fox programming when the network was created in 1986 and expanded its signal to Abilene for the first time in 1991, a precursor to the 2001 launch of full-power KXVA.

Sage Broadcasting sold KIDY to Bayou City Broadcasting in 2008; in turn, London Broadcasting purchased the station in 2012. London moved KIDY–KXVA to its present facilities and started a local news operation, which currently produces 90 minutes of regional news coverage each weeknight. Gannett, predecessor to Tegna, purchased the stations in 2014. Nexstar acquired Tegna in 2026.

== Channel 6 prior to KIDY ==
Channel 6 was originally assigned to San Angelo in 1952 but replaced with channel 3 when it was reassigned to Temple. It was restored to the city after Abilene Radio and Television, the owner of KRBC-TV in that city, petitioned the Federal Communications Commission (FCC) for its insertion in 1961, when it was one of three applicants seeking channel 3. After a conference relating to television channel assignments on the U.S.–Mexico border, it was reinstated in July 1962.

In 1966, the San Angelo Independent School District (SAISD) petitioned the FCC to have channel 6 reclassified as a reserved channel for educational broadcasting. This was vigorously opposed by SRC, Inc., a company majority-owned by Southwest Republic Co. (the owner of KHFI-TV in Austin) that sought to build channel 6 as an ABC affiliate. The school district preferred VHF channel 6 to the already reserved UHF channel 21 because of its wider coverage and easier accessibility on older television sets without UHF tuners. The commission denied the channel reservation request in September 1966. SAISD and SRC both filed for construction permits after the ruling, leading to a comparative hearing to select the winning applicants. SRC cited the need for a second station with local programming—KACB-TV (now KSAN-TV) merely rebroadcast KRBC-TV.

FCC hearing examiner Basil P. Cooper handed down an initial decision in favor of SRC in December 1968. He ruled that SRC's commercial station would offer more and diversified programs and that it would offer stronger diversification of media ownership, given that the SAISD proposal relied on the facilities of San Angelo's full-service local station, KCTV (channel 8, now KLST). The school district appealed the decision to the FCC's review board, which upheld it in March 1970, citing the school district's "fatally defective" lack of financial qualifications to build channel 6. SRC then announced its station could be on the air by the end of 1970, and it was granted the call letters KBUK-TV in September. By January 1971, a serious complication had emerged. KTXS-TV, the ABC affiliate in Sweetwater, applied for a translator of that station to provide San Angelo with the full ABC lineup. SRC opted not to build the proposed station as an independent station without a network affiliation.

== History ==
=== Early years ===
The topic of channel 6 in San Angelo recurred when Sage Broadcasting of Houston began preparing an application for the station in 1979, intending to construct a full-service ABC affiliate. The major shareholder in the company was Raymond Schindler, who had owned KVRL-TV/KDOG in Houston from 1971 to 1977. Sage's application came into conflict with another bidder, Morton Telecasting of Toledo, Ohio. Morton was owned by John D. Overmyer, the son of TV station owner Daniel H. Overmyer. The FCC granted the Sage application and dismissed that of Morton on January 15, 1982.

Sage purchased land for a tower in December 1982 and was approved to use revenue bonds to finance construction of studios on a riverfront site at 406 S. Irving that same month. During this time, three ethnic minority shareholders sued Sage, claiming their promises of stock in the company were false and designed to secure FCC approval of the company's application.

Though Sage discussed ABC affiliation for the new station, it was unable to secure ABC or NBC for KIDY. Unlike SRC twelve years prior, Sage pledged to put the station on the air even without a network. It missed several planned launch dates in 1983, including June 1, September 1, and October 1, but started broadcasting in May 1984, with the first scheduled programs airing on May 12. The lineup mostly consisted of syndicated programs, cartoons, and movies. Bill Carter, who was the general manager for most of the station's first 23 years on air, called KIDY's predicament as a small-market independent "not a pretty sight" in retrospect.

On June 24, 1985, KIDY began airing a local newscast at 9 p.m., having previously added several news briefs to its schedule. The newscasts initially struggled with inexperienced newscasters but improved over time. Other local programs aired by the station included Today Magazine, with various local features; Angelo State Rams football; and the Grim Reminder Theater block of hosted horror movies. The newscast, Action 6 News, moved to 6 p.m. at the start of 1986. KIDY was a charter affiliate of Fox when it launched in October 1986.

KIDY initially agreed to air NYPD Blue, controversial at the time for its content, when KTXS-TV passed on the new ABC program in 1993. The decision caused a backlash from the Christian Coalition, which threatened a boycott of KIDY's advertisers; the San Angelo–area Pizza Hut franchisee moved to cancel commercials he had purchased on the station. As a result, after a month, KIDY dropped Blue.

=== Expansion to Abilene ===
KIDY became the source of Fox programming in the Abilene market when it built a translator in February 1991. On that date, it was added to the major cable system in Abilene. Until then, some Fox programs were aired on a secondary basis by KTXS-TV. The wife of one of KIDY's owners, doing business as Star Broadcasting, then filed in 1995 to build a full-power station in Abilene on channel 15. Four applications were received in total for channel 15, but because the Telecommunications Act of 1996 and subsequent amendments shifted all new commercial broadcast stations to being awarded in auctions, the four parties then were ordered to bid on the allotment. That never came to pass, as the FCC approved a settlement agreement clearing the way for the Star Broadcasting application in 1999.

A final construction permit for channel 15 was issued on June 15, 2000, but the call letters KXVA had already been announced, as had been the programming plan: to move Fox to the new full-power station and convert the low-power outlet into a UPN affiliate. KXVA began broadcasting on January 18, 2001.

=== Bayou City, London, Tegna and Nexstar ownership ===
In 2008, Bayou City Broadcasting acquired Sage's remaining broadcast properties—KIDY, KXVA, and associated translators. Under Bayou City, KIDY and KXVA began simulcasting the 9 p.m. newscast of KABB, the Fox affiliate in San Antonio. In 2012, Bayou City sold KIDY and KXVA to London Broadcasting Company so that company president DuJuan McCoy could refocus on markets larger than Abilene and San Angelo. Under London, KIDY moved from its Irving Street location to a former bank building on Chadbourne Street. The new space was necessary to permit the expansion of KIDY–KXVA's news effort from inserts into KABB news simulcasts to separate local news programs beginning in January 2014.

KIDY and KXVA were purchased by the Gannett Company in 2014. Gannett's print and broadcast divisions split in 2015, with the latter taking the corporate name of Tegna Inc. After the split, in October 2015, the stations debuted a morning news program from 5:30 to 8 a.m., Wake Up West Texas. By late 2023, the morning newscast had been dropped, and KIDY and KXVA aired a half-hour 6 p.m. newscast and an hour-long newscast at 9 p.m., both on weeknights only. The stations fell under the same general manager as KWES-TV in Odessa.

Nexstar Media Group—which in San Angelo owned KLST and operated KSAN-TV—acquired Tegna in a deal announced in August 2025 and completed on March 19, 2026. A temporary restraining order issued one week later by the U.S. District Court for the Eastern District of California, later escalated to a preliminary injunction, has prevented KIDY from being integrated into KLST and KSAN.

== Subchannels ==
KIDY's transmitter is located in rural northwestern Tom Green County (east of Grape Creek). The station's signal is multiplexed:

Subchannels of KIDY
Subchannel	Res.	Short name	Programming
6.1	720p	KIDY-DT	Fox
6.2	480i	MyNet	Independent with MyNetworkTV
6.3	480i	COZI	Cozi TV
6.4	480i	Quest	Quest
6.5	480i	Busted	Busted
6.6	480i	Outlaw	Outlaw
6.7	480i	Crime	True Crime Network
6.8	480i	OPEN	[Blank]
6.9	480i	OPEN	[Blank]

KIDY began broadcasting a digital signal to San Angelo viewers on August 22, 2003. KIDY's broadcasts became digital-only on February 5, 2009, when a tube in the analog transmitter failed; the digital signal remained on channel 19.
