= Servette (disambiguation) =

Servette is a district in the city of Geneva, Switzerland

Servette may also refer to:

- Servette FC, a Swiss football club based in Geneva.
- Genève-Servette HC, a Geneva-based professional ice hockey team

== See also ==
- Servetto
