= KSAN-TV =

Television station in San Angelo, Texas

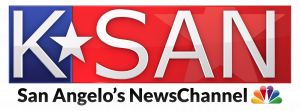
- San Angelo, Texas; United States
- Channels: Digital: 16 (UHF); Virtual: 3
- Branding: KSAN (pronounced as "K-San")

Programming
- Affiliations: 3.1: NBC; for others, see § Subchannels

Ownership
- Owner: Mission Broadcasting, Inc.
- Operator: Nexstar Media Group
- Sister stations: KLST; Tegna: KIDY

History
- First air date: February 8, 1962
- Former call signs: KACB-TV (1962–2003)
- Former channel numbers: Analog: 3 (VHF, 1962–2009)
- Call sign meaning: San Angelo

Technical information
- Licensing authority: FCC
- Facility ID: 307
- ERP: 1,000 kW
- HAAT: 159.7 m (524 ft)
- Transmitter coordinates: 31°37′23″N 100°26′15″W

Links
- Public license information: Public file; LMS
- Website: www.conchovalleyhomepage.com

KSAN-TV (channel 3) is a television station in San Angelo, Texas, United States, affiliated with NBC. It is owned by Mission Broadcasting and operated by Nexstar Media Group alongside CBS affiliate KLST (channel 8); Nexstar's Tegna subsidiary owns Fox affiliate KIDY (channel 6). KSAN-TV and KLST share studios on Armstrong Street in San Angelo; KSAN-TV's transmitter is located north of the city on SH 208.

KSAN-TV began broadcasting on February 8, 1962, as KACB-TV. It operated strictly as a satellite station of KRBC-TV, the NBC affiliate in Abilene, until 1998, when it was split off and a local news operation set up in San Angelo. The station changed its call sign to KSAN-TV in 2003 after Mission purchased the station and merged operations with KLST on June 1, 2004.

== History ==
=== Satellite of KRBC-TV ===
Channel 3 was assigned to San Angelo in August 1952 as a replacement for channel 6, an original assignment that was given to Temple. San Angelo radio station KGKL applied for and received a construction permit for the channel, but the station was soon sold. New owner Lewis O. Seibert decided against building KGKL-TV, believing San Angelo was unable to support two stations. In justifying his decision to surrender the permit, Seibert was skeptical that the San Angelo trading area, as large as Ohio, could be adequately reached by a TV station. Two applicants again sought the channel in 1956. Jane Roberts, wife of KOSA-TV owner Cecil Roberts, pulled out in October 1956, while the San Angelo Television Company (partly owned by a founder of KTXL radio) had its permit withdrawn in January 1957 for failure to build the station in a timely manner.

In January 1961, the Ackers family, owners of Abilene's KRBC-TV, filed for channel 3. They proposed to build a satellite with no San Angelo programming. Two other groups, E. C. Gunter and Dornita Enterprises, also sought the channel; to help relieve congestion, the Ackers recommended the reassignment of channel 6. Dornita and Gunter soon withdrew, construction began by October 1961, and the station signed on February 8, 1962, as KACB-TV. It originated from a facility north of San Angelo.

=== Separate operation ===
In 1997, the Ackers family agreed to sell KRBC-TV and KACB-TV to Sunrise Television Corporation, a firm backed by the private equity firm of Hicks, Muse, Tate & Furst; this was the first transfer of ownership in either station's history. Shortly after the ownership change took effect on March 31, 1998, Sunrise began planning to upgrade KACB-TV from a straight simulcast of KRBC to a locally focused NBC affiliate for San Angelo, with newscasts originating from facilities on Southwest Boulevard. This was part of an overall investment in both stations by the new owner. The first San Angelo–based newscasts aired on October 1, 1998. In 2002, Sunrise merged with another firm in which Hicks, Muse had ownership interests, LIN Television.

LIN TV sold KRBC-TV and KACB-TV to Mission Broadcasting in 2003; channel 3 changed its call sign to KSAN-TV. Mission typically contracted with Nexstar Broadcasting Group for shared services and did so in Abilene, where that company owned CBS affiliate KTAB-TV. Nexstar did not yet own a station in San Angelo, but the Mission purchase of KACB-TV accelerated its years-long pursuit of CBS affiliate KLST, which it agreed to purchase from Jewell Television Corporation. On June 1, 2004, Nexstar assumed control of KLST; KLST's news director assumed responsibility for KSAN-TV's newscasts, and Nexstar consolidated traffic—the scheduling and logging for commercials—for the San Angelo stations in Abilene at KTAB–KRBC, leading to layoffs at KLST. On February 17, 2009, both stations converted to exclusively digital broadcasts.

== Subchannels ==
The station's signal is multiplexed:

Subchannels of KSAN-TV
Subchannel	Res.	Short name	Programming
3.1	1080i	KSAN-DT	NBC
3.2	480i	Laff	Laff
3.3	480i	Bounce	Bounce TV
3.4	480i	ION	Ion
