= Killing of Jennifer Servo =

American journalist

Jennifer Servo
- Born: Jennifer Lynn Olson; September 23, 1979; Columbia Falls, Montana, U.S.
- Died: September 16, 2002 (aged 22); Abilene, Texas, U.S.
- Occupations: News anchor, reporter
- Notable credit(s): KPAX-TV, KECI-TV, KRBC-TV

On September 16, 2002, American TV journalist Jennifer Lynn Servo (born Jennifer Lynn Olson on September 23, 1979) was murdered in Abilene, Texas by an unknown perpetrator. No arrests have been made in the case, which is still being investigated as of 2020.

Servo grew up in Montana, where she worked for KPAX-TV and KECI-TV in the early 2000s. In August 2002, she moved to Abilene to work her first full-time reporting job at KRBC-TV. On September 18, after being reported missing from work, she was found dead in her apartment. She had been killed via blunt force trauma and strangulation. There were no signs of forced entry into the apartment or that she was sexually assaulted. The absence of forced entry could imply that Servo knew her attacker, but it is not known if she had any enemies in the city. Investigators investigated and cleared two men who had romantic relationships with her previously; one, who went shopping with her hours before her death, said they were being followed by another man during the trip.

== Background ==
Servo grew up in Columbia Falls, Montana. She went to Columbia Falls High School, where she was involved in cross country and cheerleading. Servo graduated in 1998. Afterwards, she enlisted in the U.S. Army Reserves. She stated that she had the ambition to be "the next Katie Couric" and to work for a large news network. She graduated from the University of Montana in May 2002, with a degree in journalism. She first worked at a local news station in Missoula, and then applied for a reporting position in Abilene, because she had a "romantic vision" of the state due to its cowboy culture. She was offered her first full-time news reporter job at KRBC-TV, and moved to Abilene in August 2002, at age 22. KRBC anchor Downing Bolls said, "You could see early on that Jennifer had the tools it was going to take to move on to bigger and better things."

== Murder ==
On September 16, 2002, Servo returned from shopping to her new apartment in Abilene sometime between 12:30am and 1:39am. She spoke to a friend on the phone at 1:39am. Two days later, after her coworkers had reported her as absent for work, either they or the apartment manager went to check on her. She was found fully clothed, "face-down and slumped over" the bathtub of her new apartment. She was pronounced dead that afternoon. She had been murdered by strangulation and blunt force trauma on September 16. There were blood marks tracking from the floor near her bed (which was in the living room) into the bathroom. She had signs of bruising around her genitals, but no signs of molestation; the investigation theorized this was pressure from the victim's knee. She was already dead before "the upper portion of her body entered the water".

== Investigation ==
=== Overview ===
The case remains unsolved and no arrests have been made. The case is still being investigated by the Abilene Police Department as of 2020. Abilene police initially took DNA from six people close to Servo. Her apartment door was locked, and the lack of forced entry into the apartment could imply that she knew her murderer beforehand. Her friend claimed that she would not open her door for a stranger, as she was nervous after moving to a new city. She had even gotten a local P.O. box so that she would not receive mail at her apartment. Previously, a neighbor heard her and somebody else arguing in the apartment for some length of time. Some reports state that after she was murdered, somebody checked out books at a library using her college library card. It is not publicly known which books were checked out. In 2014, the Abilene Police Department said they were following through with new leads in the case, though as of 2018, it is not clear what those leads were. In the 2020s, police sent old evidence to private labs for new DNA testing.

=== Persons of interest ===
There have been two persons of interest considered by police, both of whom were cleared by investigators without any charges being laid. Servo's relatives and investigators initially believed Ralph Sepulveda, her ex-boyfriend, was a person of interest. He was an Army Ranger who she had met while serving in the Army Reserves in Montana. About a month after they met, they started living together in Abilene. They lived together for a few weeks before she discovered that back in Montana, he had a child from another relationship and a fiancée whom he had broken up with to live with her. After the breakup, he moved to a different apartment in Abilene. According to Servo's friend, about three weeks after they broke up, he asked if they could start dating again, and she declined. Investigators obtained a letter that he had written to his ex-girlfriend, saying that he still loved her and no longer had any feelings for Servo. Weeks after moving apartments, he moved from Abilene and re-enlisted in the Army for active duty. He told police that he was home the night of the murder, having fallen asleep around 10:30pm. He did not ask the police any questions about the murder and seemed "guarded". His behavior and potential motive considered, investigators at one point believed that the district attorney could charge him with murder.

Brian Travers, Servo's coworker and a weatherman at KRBC, also became a person of interest, but he was cleared because investigators did not believe he was a strong candidate. He and Servo had a brief "romantic fling"; Oxygen wrote that "based on entries in her diary, it seemed he was more into her than she was into him." They ran errands together hours before her death. On September 15, they had left work at 11:30pm to go shopping, then left the store at 12:30am on September 16. He told police that a car had been following them that night. He gave his DNA to the police in the investigation. No charges have ever been brought against Travers.

== Legacy ==
Servo's murder became one of the most high-profile cold cases in Abilene. It has been covered by numerous media outlets since 2002, including Cosmopolitan, the TV shows America's Most Wanted and 48 Hours Mystery, and the podcast Cold Justice. A scholarship was established in her name at the University of Montana after her death.

== See also ==
- List of unsolved murders (2000–present)
