= Servo Robot Group =

Digital vision and sensing system company

SERVO-ROBOT Inc.
- Industry: Welding Automation
- Founded: Headquarters : SERVO-ROBOT Inc. St-Bruno-de-Montarville, Quebec, Canada (1983)
- Products: Intelligent Robotic Sensing and Laser Vision Systems
- Divisions: SERVO-ROBOT Corp. WI, USA (1993); SERVO-ROBOT Japan, Osaka (1994); SERVO-ROBOT China, Beijing (2004)); SERVO-ROBOT SHANGHAI Trading Co. Ltd., Shanghai (2015)); SERVO-ROBOT GmbH, Germany (2012); SERVO-ROBOT Mexico, Guadalajara (2014))
- Website: www.servo-robot.com

SERVO-ROBOT Group is a company that develops and creates intelligent sensing and digital vision systems to simplify manufacturing process automation such as welding. Therefore, the main activity is to build intelligent sensing systems based on precision measurement with laser beams and other intelligent sensing devices applicable to various industries such as automotive, railroad, pipe and tube, aerospace, shipbuilding, fabricated structures, windmill towers manufacturing, etc.

Founded in 1983, SERVO-ROBOT has established its world headquarters, production plant and research and development center in the St-Bruno Industrial Park, south of Montreal, Quebec, Canada. More than 95% of SERVO-ROBOT's products are exported outside of Canada every year.

== Applications ==
Innovations developed in patents mentioned in the above section resulted in concrete solutions easily applicable to markets ranging from automotive to aerospace which has helped many companies and factories to become more productive and reach their Six Sigma constant improvements goals.

Aircraft & Aerospace	Automotive	Construction
Welding automation: Jet engine exhaust turbine blades; Turbo prop engine casing Robotic measurement of wings for machining operation	Robotic joining of body components Inspection: Suspension member; Frame assembly, chassis; Laser-brazed roof-pillar junction LWB applications Tracking for complex 3D weld seam Blank palletizing/ de-palletizing	Welding automation: Pipe steel structural components; Bridge structural components; Aluminum concrete form Inspection of offshore oil-ring platform
Earth Moving Equipment	Railroad	Shipbuilding
Welding automation: Heavy machinery weldments On-Site quality control of weld bead geometry and dimensions	Welding automation: Wagon bogie; Aluminum passenger cars; Panel lines	Welding automation: Ship Stiffeners; Submarines; Panel lines
Tank & Vessel	Tube & Pipe	Windmill Tower
Welding automation: Water heater tanks; Aluminum fuel tanks; Stainless steel tanks Inspection of leak sensitive gas tanks Pressure Vessels	Welding automation: U-O pipe; Spiral pipe; High-speed pipeline welding machines Quality control of weld beads Tracking for ultrasonic testing Pipe diameter measurement	Roll formed tube longitudinal weld seam tracking Outside circumferential weld seam tracking and adaptive control Inside circumferential weld seam tracking and adaptive control
