= KTXS-TV =

Television station in Sweetwater, Texas

KTXS-TV and KTXE-LD

KTXS-TV: Sweetwater–Abilene, Texas; KTXE-LD: San Angelo, Texas; United States
- Channels for KTXS-TV: Digital: 20 (UHF); Virtual: 12
- Channels for KTXE-LD: Digital: 22 (UHF); Virtual: 38
- Branding: KTXS-TV: KTXS (pronounced "K-Texas"); The CW Abilene (12.2); KTXE-LD: ABC 38; The CW San Angelo (38.2)

Programming
- Affiliations: 12.1/38.1: ABC; 12.2/38.2: CW+; 12.3: Roar (KTES-LD)

Ownership
- Owner: Sinclair Broadcast Group; (Sinclair Media Licensee, LLC)
- Sister stations: KTES-LD

History
- First air date: KTXS-TV: January 30, 1956; KTXE-LD: July 19, 1971
- Former call signs: KTXS-TV: KPAR-TV (1956–1966); KTXE-LD: K55AA (1971–1997); KTXE-LP (1997–2014)
- Former channel number: KTXS-TV: Analog: 12 (VHF, 1956–2009); KTXE-LD: Analog: 55 (UHF, 1971–1997), 38 (UHF, 1997–2014); Digital: 38 (UHF, 2014–2021)
- Former affiliations: KTXS-TV: CBS (1956–1979); ABC (secondary, 1956–1979)
- Call sign meaning: KTXS-TV: Texas; KTXE-LD: Disambiguation of KTXS

Technical information
- Licensing authority: FCC
- Facility ID: KTXS-TV: 308; KTXE-LD: 309
- Class: KTXE-LD: LD
- ERP: KTXS-TV: 710 kW; KTXE-LD: 15 kW
- HAAT: KTXS-TV: 439.3 m (1,441 ft); KTXE-LD: 108.2 m (355 ft)
- Transmitter coordinates: KTXS-TV: 32°24′48.4″N 100°6′26.3″W; KTXE-LD: 31°29′6″N 100°27′27″W

Links
- Public license information: KTXS-TV: Public file; LMS; KTXE-LD: Public file; LMS
- Website: ktxs.com

KTXS-TV (channel 12) is a television station licensed to Sweetwater, Texas, United States, serving the Abilene area as an affiliate of ABC and The CW Plus. It is owned by Sinclair Broadcast Group alongside KTES-LD (channel 40), broadcasting the diginet Roar, and KTXE-LD (channel 38), which rebroadcasts KTXS-TV in the San Angelo area. The stations share studios on North Clack Street in Abilene; KTXS-TV's transmitter is located near Trent, Texas, and KTXE-LD is broadcast from a site on West 26th Street in San Angelo.

Channel 12 began broadcasting on January 30, 1956, as KPAR-TV, which was owned by and rebroadcast most of the programming of KDUB-TV, the CBS affiliate in Lubbock. Texas Key Broadcasting assumed operational control in 1960; the station added ABC affiliation and broke away from the Lubbock station, and the station moved its transmitter to Trent to increase coverage.

Grayson Enterprises bought KPAR-TV in 1966 and immediately changed the call sign to KTXS-TV. It built the present Abilene-area studios, which replaced facilities in Sweetwater and led to fines and a hearing by the Federal Communications Commission; the station also built the San Angelo translator at this time. As a result of multiple indiscretions, Grayson divested itself of KTXS-TV and other stations in "distress sales" to minority-controlled broadcasters in 1980. KTXS had four owners in a six-year period, all of whom tried to raise the station from a distant last place in news ratings.

Lamco Communications purchased KTXS in 1986 and raised its news department to a more competitive second place in the Abilene market. KTXS provided the local outlet of Telemundo from 2000 to 2010 and added The CW in 2006. It was purchased by Sinclair as part of its 2017 acquisition of Bonten Media Group.

== History ==
=== KPAR-TV: Early years ===
Texas Telecasting, Inc., the owner of KDUB-TV in Lubbock, filed with the Federal Communications Commission (FCC) on June 29, 1953, to build a new TV station on channel 12 in Sweetwater as well as a station at Big Spring. The FCC approved the Sweetwater application on August 26, and Texas Telecasting revealed its plans for the station, which would mostly rebroadcast KDUB-TV and its CBS programs.

Construction on KPAR-TV began in September 1955, after KDUB-TV received new equipment; items previously used in Lubbock would be transferred to the new Sweetwater station. The tower was erected in January 1956, and KPAR-TV began broadcasting on January 30, 1956, with a three-hour dedication broadcast from its studio in Sweetwater. The station also briefly affiliated with the NTA Film Network, which began in September 1956. In 1958, the station opened a second studio in downtown Abilene.

In 1960, Texas Telecasting filed to lease KPAR-TV to Texas Key Broadcasting in a 10-year, nearly $800,000 agreement. Texas Key was owned by residents of Abilene including the station's general manager, James M. Isaacs. The new operators filed to move the station's transmitter to a site south of Trent in 1961; the higher elevation would improve coverage in the Abilene market. Texas Key bought the physical assets of KPAR-TV, as well as KDUB radio and television in Lubbock and KEDY-TV in Big Spring, in 1961.

The new transmitter and 568-foot (173 m) tower at Trent were activated on February 1, 1962, by which time the station had added ABC programs to its schedule. Texas Key sued the Lubbock TV station, which had become KLBK-TV, and its new corporate parent Grayson Enterprises in 1964 for failing to maintain the microwave transmission system that brought CBS programs from Lubbock to KPAR-TV, forcing channel 12 to contract for its own network feed from CBS.

=== KTXS-TV: Grayson Enterprises ownership ===
Grayson Enterprises agreed to buy KPAR-TV from Texas Key Telecasting in January 1966; part of the sale agreement stipulated the abandonment of the microwave system lawsuit. The $625,000 sale was completed on June 23, and on July 1, the station changed its call sign to KTXS-TV ("K-Texas TV"). Grayson promised to reactivate the Sweetwater studio, which had been previously shuttered, and add new video tape and color equipment.

Grayson invested in two translators to expand KTXS-TV's reach. In 1969, it received approval to build a rebroadcaster at Brownwood. Two years later, on July 19, 1971, KTXS-TV installed translator K55AA in San Angelo, bringing that city the previously unseen ABC network; CBS programs were blacked out to protect KCTV there. In addition to providing ABC to San Angelo, the move derailed plans by SRC, Inc., to construct a new local station affiliated with the network.

The operation of Grayson's Texas stations came into question by the FCC as early as 1971, when the commission fined KTXS-TV $5,000 for moving its studio from Sweetwater to Abilene. It defended the move as necessary to compete with KRBC-TV, the only Abilene station at the time, which told the FCC that much of the operation had been relocated anyway. In 1977, the FCC designated the licenses of all four Grayson stations, including KTXS-TV, for hearing. Two of the charges specifically concerned channel 12: the commission sought to ascertain whether Grayson lacked candor in its communications about the Abilene studio move, and the FCC cited the station as having engaged in the practice of "clipping", or running local commercials over network material. Grayson got a new way out of the hearings after the commission introduced the "distress sale" policy, which permitted a station facing possible revocation of its broadcast license to be sold a group that was minority-controlled. The sale had to be made at a price substantially below the station's market value. Grayson was given time to find qualified buyers for its four TV stations.

While Grayson searched for a buyer, an ice storm collapsed the KTXS-TV tower at Trent, by this point 1,000 feet (300 m) high, on January 1, 1979. The top 650 feet (200 m) separated and landed on the adjacent transmitter building, damaging the roof. In time to air the 1978 NFC Championship Game, KTXS-TV returned to the air on January 12, broadcasting from an antenna attached to the remaining 300 feet (91 m) of the mast. The replacement tower was completed in January 1980. Also during this time, a third Abilene station, KTAB-TV (channel 32), was authorized and took the CBS affiliation, leaving KTXS-TV a sole ABC affiliate. In the time before KTAB-TV went on the air, KTXS-TV had carried little CBS programming, with the notable exception of Dallas Cowboys football, and the full CBS lineup was only available locally on cable by way of KDFW in Dallas.

=== Carousel of owners ===
In April 1979, Grayson agreed to sell KTXS-TV and KLBK-TV to Silver Star Communications, a majority-Black partnership soon renamed Prima Inc., for $15 million. The Black owners in Prima were Wayne Embry, a former professional basketball player; John Robert Lee, assistant athletic director at the University of Wisconsin; and Larry Reed, a basketball coach at the same university. Charles Woods later became an investor in the company. The sale process dragged out due to protests by another group, led by former congresswoman Barbara Jordan, that sought to purchase the stations and wanted clarity as to the then-new distress sale policy. During this time, Grayson's principal creditor, the Mercantile National Bank of Dallas, threatened foreclosure. The FCC rebuffed the objections in March and April 1980, upholding the distress sale to Prima. Final closure of the deal came three months later after several delays.

Prima set up its corporate office in Abilene and announced plans to expand the news staff and purchase new equipment. The firm showed signs of financial weakness in 1982. Former shareholders in Grayson Enterprises sued the company for $1.18 million, alleging non-payment on the note that financed the transactions, and in March 1983, syndicator Lorimar Productions sued for breach of contract.

Catclaw Communications, an Abilene-based company led by S. M. Moore, purchased KTXS-TV in 1983 from Prima. Two years later, SouthWest MultiMedia of Houston purchased the station from Catclaw.

=== Lamco, Bluestone, Bonten and Sinclair ownership ===
SouthWest MultiMedia, just over a year after agreeing to purchase KTXS-TV, sold it to Lamco Communications of Williamsport, Pennsylvania, in 1986. KTXS briefly aired Fox programs in late-night hours on Saturdays from September 1990 to February 1991, when a translator of San Angelo Fox affiliate KIDY opened in Abilene.

In 2000, Lamco acquired the former K40DX, a low-power Telemundo station started by the network in 1995, and renamed it KTES-LP, with Spanish-language local news briefs produced by the KTXS news department.

Lamco put its stations on the market in 2003. After a deal with Larry Wilson, a former Citadel Broadcasting executive, fell through, the Lamco portfolio was sold to BlueStone Television, a company led by Sandy DiPasquale, in 2004. The CW was added on a subchannel in 2006.

The BlueStone stations were sold in 2007 to Bonten Media Group, led by former Emmis Communications station group president Randy Bongarten, for $230 million. Bonten discontinued the Telemundo feed and replaced it with This TV in 2010 in response to low ratings, especially compared to The CW. Sinclair Broadcast Group acquired the Bonten portfolio in 2017 for $240 million.

On June 8, 2025, straight-line winds tore the roof off part of the studios on Clack Street and toppled a studio-transmitter link tower onto the building. Master control functions for the station had been moved to sister station WTVC in Chattanooga, Tennessee, which allowed Sinclair to send a feed through KVII-TV in Amarillo for the local cable system and to uplink KTXS for reception by a company satellite truck at the transmitter site. The news department utilized temporary facilities at Abilene Christian University.

== News operation ==
KTXS-TV was traditionally the last-place news outlet in Abilene, even when the market only had two local stations. KRBC-TV commanded viewer loyalty with ratings shares as high as 80 percent. After KTAB-TV signed on in 1979, it supplanted KRBC as the number-one station, but KTXS remained a distant third, with its evening newscasts drawing 12 to 15 percent of the Abilene-market audience. Successive owners of channel 12 attempted with little success to improve the ratings by making changes to the newscasts. When Prima acquired KTXS, its vice president assessed that "KTXS has not been doing what it should have been doing in news", and the new news director called the existing news product "a joke".

A short upturn in ratings began in 1985, during Catclaw Communications ownership, with increases of 20 to 40% in news audience and a growing viewership among adults 18–49 even as ABC's prime time ratings slumped. Catclaw had hired Len Johnson, a longtime radio newsman for KRBC, because owner S. M. Moore wanted to remedy the news image of having inexperienced reporters and anchor and bring in someone with "gray around the temples". He was replaced as main anchor in early 1985 with Pat Brown, under whom the ratings increases began. The momentum was soon lost, and KTXS fell further back of KRBC.

During the 1990s and 2000s, the station's ratings for news increased. By 1995, KTXS had pulled ahead of KRBC at 6 and 10 p.m., and in February 1999 it swept the ratings, knocking KTAB-TV out of first place. KTAB quickly retook first place in those time periods, but KTXS had increased its margin on KRBC; its newscasts continued to reach a younger audience desired by advertisers; and it led in the 6 a.m. and 5 p.m. slots.

As of 2023, the station produced 19 1/2 hours a week of local news and a weekly sports show, KTXS Sports Sunday. KTXS newscasts utilize an anchorless format.

== Technical information ==
=== Subchannels ===
KTXE-LD logo

San Angelo CW logo

KTXS-TV's transmitter is located near Trent, Texas, and KTXE-LD is broadcast from a site on West 26th Street in San Angelo. The stations' signals are multiplexed:

Subchannels of KTXS-TV and KTXE-LD
Subchannel		Res.	Short name		Programming
KTXS-TV	KTXE-LD	Res.	KTXS-TV	KTXE-LD	Programming
12.1	38.1	720p	KTXS	KTXE	ABC
12.2	38.2	720p	CW		The CW Plus
12.3	N/A	480i	ROAR	N/A	Roar (KTES-LD)

Simulcast of subchannels of another station

=== Analog-to-digital conversion ===
KTXS-TV began providing a digital signal in September 2002, making it the first Big Country television station to broadcast in digital. It shut down its analog signal, over VHF channel 12, on June 12, 2009, the official date on which full-power television stations in the United States transitioned from analog to digital broadcasts under federal mandate. The station's digital signal remained on its pre-transition UHF channel 20, using virtual channel 12.
