= KLST =

Television station in San Angelo, Texas

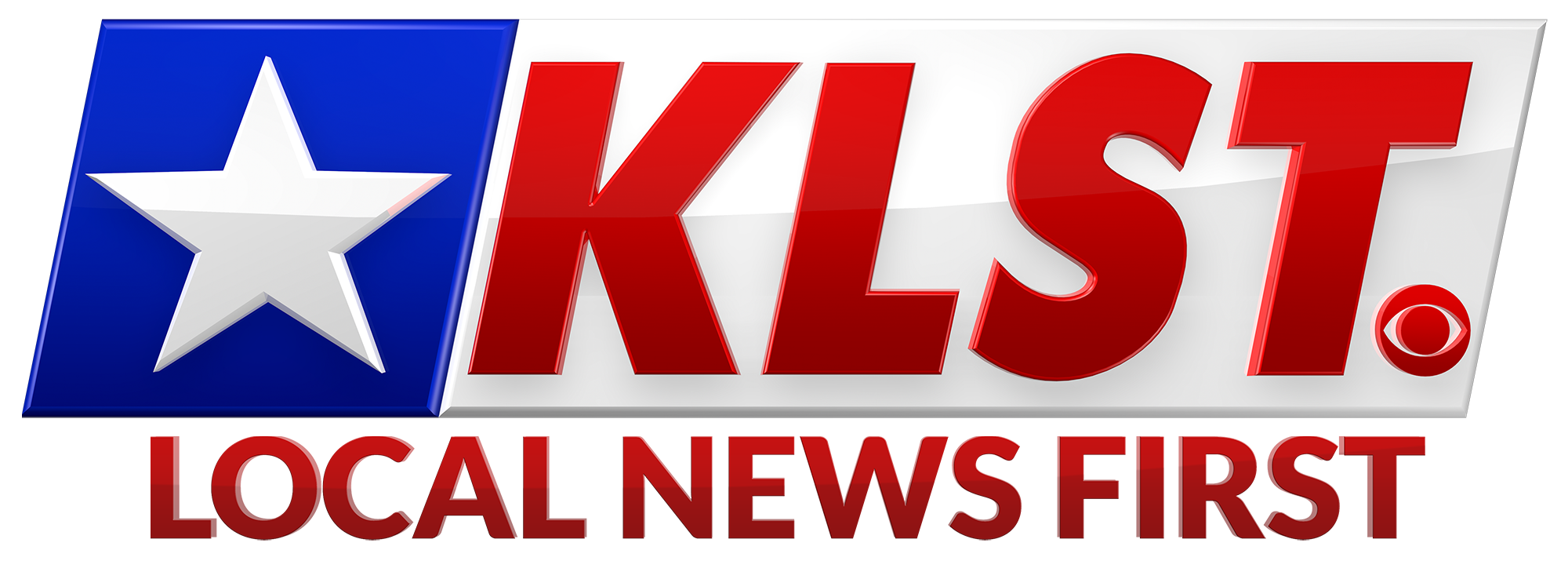
- San Angelo, Texas; United States
- Channels: Digital: 11 (VHF); Virtual: 8
- Branding: KLST

Programming
- Affiliations: 8.1: CBS; for others, see § Subchannels

Ownership
- Owner: Nexstar Media Group; (Nexstar Media Inc.)
- Sister stations: KSAN-TV; Tegna: KIDY

History
- First air date: July 6, 1953
- Former call signs: KTXL-TV (1953–1957); KCTV (1957–1983)
- Former channel numbers: Analog: 8 (VHF, 1953–2009)
- Call sign meaning: "Lone Star Television"

Technical information
- Licensing authority: FCC
- Facility ID: 31114
- ERP: 18.8 kW
- HAAT: 434.2 m (1,425 ft)
- Transmitter coordinates: 31°22′2″N 100°2′49″W

Links
- Public license information: Public file; LMS
- Website: conchovalleyhomepage.com

KLST (channel 8) is a television station in San Angelo, Texas, United States, affiliated with CBS. It is owned by Nexstar Media Group and operated alongside NBC affiliate KSAN-TV (channel 3); Nexstar's Tegna subsidiary owns Fox affiliate KIDY (channel 6). KLST and KSAN-TV share studios on Armstrong Street in San Angelo; KLST's transmitter is located near Eola, Texas.

Channel 8 is the oldest station in San Angelo, signing on as KTXL-TV in 1953 and changing call signs to KCTV in 1957. It was a CBS affiliate from its first day on air. KCTV became KLST in 1983 when its call sign was purchased by a TV station in Kansas City, Missouri. Nexstar acquired KLST in 2004 and consolidated operations with Mission Broadcasting–owned KSAN-TV.

== History ==
On October 21, 1952, Armistead D. Rust—the mayor of San Angelo—and B. P. Bludworth of Brownwood, trading as Westex Television Company, filed an application with the Federal Communications Commission (FCC) for permission to build a television station in the city on channel 8. Rust and Bludworth owned KTXL (1340 AM), the city's Mutual Broadcasting System radio affiliate. Approval was swift and came on November 26, 1952.

Channel 8 was the first television station in San Angelo, signing on the air on July 6, 1953. The station was an affiliate at launch of the CBS and DuMont networks and additionally aired national news from NBC; NBC entertainment programs were added to the schedule in August. Rust and Bludworth sold KTXL radio in 1956 and a majority stake in KTXL-TV to Roy Simmons and Angelo Broadcasting-Telecasting, the owners of radio station KGKL, in 1957; on August 4, the station changed call signs to KCTV to sever itself of any connection to KTXL radio.

In 1959, Big Spring Broadcasting, a company led by Houston Harte Jr., acquired majority control of KCTV. Houston and his brother, Edward Harte, became full owners in 1962. The station was sold once more in 1971 to T. B. Lanford, trading as the Jewell Television Corporation. Lanford owned broadcast stations in other Southern cities and in Colorado; Jewell Television was named for Lanford's wife. That same year, the station began local broadcasting in color. Lanford died in 1978, but his estate continued to own the station, with Tom Gresham as executor and later president of Jewell. Under Jewell, the station built its current transmitter site near Eola, Texas, in 1981.

In 1983, the station changed its call letters again to become KLST. The change had been induced by channel 5 in Kansas City, Missouri, which needed to change its call sign and was interested in becoming KCTV; the Missouri station paid all of channel 8's name change expenses.

The Kimbell family, related to the Lanfords, bought Jewell in 1994; the Louisiana radio stations were sold off, leaving channel 8 the company's only holding. By the turn of the millennium, the Kimbells realized changes in the television industry made it impossible to justify running KLST as a standalone property. They sold channel 8 to Nexstar Broadcasting in 2004. Nexstar was already operating KSAN-TV under joint sales and shared services agreements with Mission Broadcasting; it had made several offers to Jewell in the early 2000s and particularly after the Mission purchase. On June 1, 2004, Nexstar assumed control of KLST while the sale was finalized; KLST's news director assumed responsibility for KSAN-TV's newscasts, and Nexstar consolidated traffic—the scheduling and logging for commercials—for the San Angelo stations in Abilene at KTAB/KRBC, leading to layoffs at KLST. On February 17, 2009, both stations converted to exclusively digital broadcasts.

Nexstar acquired Tegna—owner of Fox affiliate KIDY (channel 6)—in a deal announced in August 2025 and completed on March 19, 2026. A temporary restraining order issued one week later by the U.S. District Court for the Eastern District of California, later escalated to a preliminary injunction, has prevented KIDY from being integrated into KLST and KSAN.

== News operation ==
KLST presently broadcasts 19 hours of locally produced newscasts each week (with 3 1/2 hours each weekday, one hour on Saturdays and switches between a half-hour and one hour on Sundays during sports seasons).

== Subchannels ==
The station's signal is multiplexed:

Subchannels of KLST
Subchannel	Res.	Short name	Programming
8.1	1080i	KLST-DT	CBS
8.2	480i	GRIT	Grit
8.3	480i	Escape	Ion Mystery
8.4	480i	ANTtv	Antenna TV
