= KRBC-TV =

Television station in Abilene, Texas

- Abilene, Texas; United States
- Channels: Digital: 29 (UHF); Virtual: 9
- Branding: KRBC

Programming
- Affiliations: 9.1: NBC; for others, see § Subchannels

Ownership
- Owner: Mission Broadcasting, Inc.
- Operator: Nexstar Media Group
- Sister stations: KTAB-TV; Tegna: KXVA

History
- First air date: August 30, 1953
- Former channel numbers: Analog: 9 (VHF, 1953–2009)
- Former affiliations: All secondary: CBS (1953–1956); DuMont (1953–1956); ABC (1953–1979)
- Call sign meaning: Reporter Broadcasting Company (founding owners of KRBC radio)

Technical information
- Licensing authority: FCC
- Facility ID: 306
- ERP: 1,000 kW
- HAAT: 258 m (846 ft)
- Transmitter coordinates: 32°16′38″N 99°35′52″W

Links
- Public license information: Public file; LMS
- Website: www.bigcountryhomepage.com

KRBC-TV (channel 9) is a television station in Abilene, Texas, United States, affiliated with NBC. It is owned by Mission Broadcasting and operated by Nexstar Media Group alongside CBS/Telemundo affiliate KTAB-TV (channel 32); Nexstar's Tegna subsidiary owns Fox affiliate KXVA (channel 15). KRBC-TV and KLST-TV share studios on South 14th Street in western Abilene; KRBC-TV's transmitter is located on Texas State Highway 36 in neighboring Callahan County.

== History ==
The Federal Communications Commission (FCC) first received a request for a construction permit from the Citizens Broadcasting Company, owners of KWKC radio (1340 AM) on May 1, 1952. The Reporter Broadcasting Company, owners of KRBC radio (1470 AM, now KYYW), applied for a permit to own a television station on July 14, 1952 and was granted by the FCC on April 15, 1953.

KRBC-TV began its broadcasting operations on August 30, 1953, as the first television station in Abilene. The original transmitter and tower facility was located atop Rattlesnake Mountain in Cedar Gap. KRBC originally carried a mixture of programming from all four networks of the time—NBC, CBS, ABC, and DuMont. It however was a primary NBC affiliate. It lost CBS in 1956 when KPAR-TV (now KTXS-TV) signed on. The two stations shared ABC until KTAB-TV signed on and took CBS, leaving KRBC as an NBC affiliate.

In 1962, KACB-TV signed on from San Angelo as a semi-satellite of KRBC. The Ackers family's broadcast holdings, Abilene Radio and Television Company, owned the station for 44 years until selling it to Sunrise Television in 1997. Two years later, Sunrise severed the connection between KRBC and KACB, and KACB became a full-fledged station; it is now KSAN-TV.

On September 16, 2002, KRBC reporter Jennifer Servo was murdered in Abilene by an unknown perpetrator.

In 2002, Sunrise merged with LIN Television. In 2003, LIN sold KRBC to Mission Broadcasting. Mission Broadcasting, in turn, contracted with the Nexstar Broadcasting Group, owner of KTAB, to provide news, traffic, sales, engineering, and business operations under a shared sales agreement.

In 2005, Nexstar completed the consolidation of the KTAB operations into the older, larger KRBC building at 4510 South 14th Street in Abilene. Nexstar had already taken over KRBC's operations a year earlier under a joint sales agreement with KTAB as the senior partner. The original KTAB building was sold and has subsequently been converted into an office building. The computerized and automated master control facility not only operates KRBC and KTAB in Abilene, but also sister Nexstar/Mission stations KLST and KSAN-TV in San Angelo.

KRBC's logo prior to February 2, 2013

During a January 14, 2007 ice storm, KRBC's transmission tower collapsed, taking the station's analog signal off the air for 13 hours. The collapse not only destroyed the tower and the analog antenna, but also the station's low-power digital transmission antenna. However, the falling tower missed the transmitter building and an adjacent auxiliary antenna; station engineers were able to get KRBC's analog channel 9 signal back on the air using that auxiliary antenna. The collapse also destroyed the antenna for NOAA Weather Radio station WXK29, leaving it off the air until a new antenna was installed. A microwave link on the tower which helped provide programming to KLST and KSAN in San Angelo was also destroyed in the collapse. In December 2007, Nexstar set up a dual-path fiber-optic cable link to the San Angelo broadcast facility.

The station's digital signal remained off the air until October 2007, when it returned to the air on digital channel 29 with all NBC programming presented in HD.

In 2009, following the FCC-mandated cessation of analog broadcasting, KRBC's new full-power digital transmitter was installed in a new facility at KTAB's tower site; both stations now broadcast from the same tower. The Cedar Gap facility was sold to AEP, who had already constructed a new tower at the site.

In May 2007, KTAB and KRBC's websites were combined into one, BigCountryHomepage.com. The site is maintained with content produced by both stations, and serves as a community portal to Abilene and the surrounding areas.

== News operation ==
KRBC presently broadcasts 16 1/2 hours of locally produced newscasts each week (with three hours each weekday, one hour on Saturdays and a half-hour on Sundays).

On February 2, 2013, KRBC began broadcasting its local newscasts in 16:9 widescreen standard definition with a new set, logo, and graphics, becoming the second station to make the switch. In the fourth week of August 2016, the station began broadcasting its newscasts in high definition, becoming the third station in the market to make the upgrade.

=== Notable former on-air staff ===
- John Hambrick – anchor (1960s)
- Art Rascon – anchor/reporter (1985–1987)
- Jennifer Servo – reporter

== Technical information ==
=== Subchannels ===
The station's signal is multiplexed:

Subchannels of KRBC-TV
Subchannel	Res.	Short name	Programming
9.1	1080i	KRBC-DT	NBC
9.2	480i	Grit	Grit
9.3	480i	Laff	Laff
9.4	480i	Bounce	Bounce TV

Installation of full-power digital transmitters for both KRBC-DT and KTAB-DT was completed in October 2007. The transmitters are housed in a newly constructed building at the KTAB tower site, adjacent to the former analog transmitter building on a mountaintop southeast of Potosi. Both stations share the same digital antenna on the KTAB tower. A new digital 7 GHz microwave studio-transmitter link (STL), as well as a master control update, has allowed both stations to deliver the high definition signals to the entire coverage area, as well as delivering Dolby Digital 5.1 audio. Both NBC and CBS networks use the 1080i HDTV format.

Both KTAB and KRBC operate digital microwave links in the 7 GHz and 2 GHz spectrums.

On June 15, 2016, Nexstar announced that it has entered into an affiliation agreement with Katz Broadcasting for the Escape (now Ion Mystery), Laff, Grit, and Bounce TV networks (the last one of which is owned by Bounce Media LLC, whose COO Jonathan Katz is president/CEO of Katz Broadcasting), bringing one or more of the four networks to 81 stations owned and/or operated by Nexstar, including KRBC-TV and KTAB-TV.

=== Analog-to-digital conversion ===
KRBC-TV shut down its analog signal, over VHF channel 9, on May 12, 2009. The station's digital signal remained on its pre-transition UHF channel 29, using virtual channel 9.

== 2005 cable dispute ==
On January 1, 2005, at midnight, KRBC was removed from the cable television lineup in the city of Abilene after months of dispute between the station owner(s) and Cox Communications, now Suddenlink Communications. In accordance with Federal Communications Commission (FCC) regulations, KRBC station owner Mission Broadcasting (operated by Nexstar Broadcasting) tried to make an agreement with the cable system to continue carrying KRBC's NBC programming. Cox Communications claimed KRBC wanted its cable system to pay for its transmission. The disagreement began with KRBC/Mission/Nexstar requesting 10 cents per subscriber for KRBC to be carried on the Cox Cable system in the Abilene area. The basic argument was that satellite providers pay for the right to rebroadcast local affiliates' signals, and that cable operators should, as well.

Due to the dispute, Cox eventually dropped KRBC from its system, which caused many city residents to purchase an antenna for their homes to pick up the station's analog signal for NBC programming. Later in the year, KRBC and the other local television stations were picked up by Dish Network in a local channel package, which was strongly supported and promoted by KRBC/Mission/Nexstar. During the time KRBC was off the cable system, Cox replaced what was the KRBC spot on cable channel 5 with family-oriented cable stations from its digital line-up (such as HBO Family and Noggin). The cable system also added several temporary channels to its lineup off its digital cable lineup to preview and to give disgruntled customers several new channels. After 9 1/2 months of negotiations between Nexstar and Cox Communications, the KRBC signal was returned to the Cox lineup in Abilene on October 20, 2005.
