= KTAB-TV =

Television station in Abilene, Texas

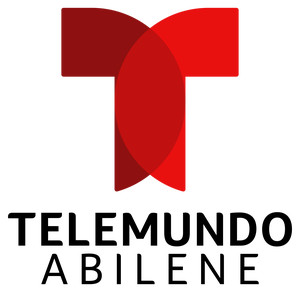
- Abilene, Texas; United States
- Channels: Digital: 30 (UHF); Virtual: 32
- Branding: KTAB News (pronounced "K-TAB"); Telemundo Abilene (32.2)

Programming
- Affiliations: 32.1: CBS; 32.2: Telemundo; for others, see § Subchannels

Ownership
- Owner: Nexstar Media Group; (Nexstar Media Inc.)
- Sister stations: KRBC-TV; Tegna: KXVA

History
- First air date: October 6, 1979
- Former channel numbers: Analog: 32 (UHF, 1979–2009); Digital: 24 (UHF, to 2020)

Technical information
- Licensing authority: FCC
- Facility ID: 59988
- ERP: 1,000 kW
- HAAT: 258 m (846 ft)
- Transmitter coordinates: 32°16′38″N 99°35′52″W

Links
- Public license information: Public file; LMS
- Website: KTAB/KRBC; Telemundo Abilene

KTAB-TV (channel 32) is a television station in Abilene, Texas, United States, affiliated with CBS and Telemundo. It is owned by Nexstar Media Group and operated alongside NBC affiliate KRBC-TV (channel 9); Nexstar's Tegna subsidiary owns Fox affiliate KXVA (channel 15). KTAB-TV and KRBC-TV share studios on South 14th Street in western Abilene; KTAB-TV's transmitter is located on Texas State Highway 36 in neighboring Callahan County.

KTAB-TV went on the air in October 1979 as Abilene's third commercial station, bringing the full CBS schedule to the Big Country. It was built by a consortium headed by Bill Terry, who had been KRBC-TV's general manager, and several of that station's on-air personalities moved to the new channel 32. The news product was immediately successful and within five years supplanted KRBC as the area's local news leader. By the mid-1980s, KTAB was the market's dominant station for local news, attracting some of the highest ratings in the country. The station was sold several times in the 1980s and 1990s, including an 11-year ownership tenure by Shamrock Broadcasting, before being purchased by Nexstar in 1999. Nexstar acquired the non-license assets of KRBC-TV in 2003 and merged the two operations together in that station's studios in 2004.

== History ==
Big Country TV Inc., a group majority-owned and led by KRBC-TV general manager Bill Terry, filed with the Federal Communications Commission (FCC) in March 1978 for a construction permit to build a new TV station on ultra high frequency (UHF) channel 32 in Abilene. The group waited a year before receiving FCC approval in March 1979, announcing it would be a CBS affiliate and bringing full network service to Abilene. At the time, KTXS-TV in Sweetwater was an affiliate of CBS and ABC, though by that time it heavily favored ABC. As such, CBS affiliation was available. Cable viewers could watch the full CBS schedule via Dallas's KDFW-TV. Picking up CBS gave the new station, which took the call letters KTAB-TV, an immediate audience draw: most Dallas Cowboys football games.

In staffing KTAB, Terry poached a number of key employees from his former employer, then the leading news station in Abilene. Larry Fitzgerald, a 25-year veteran of KRBC, left that station to become channel 32's first news director. Sportscaster Bob Bartlett joined KTAB as a news anchor; he remained with KTAB as of 2019. Meanwhile, equipment arrived at the studios and the transmitter site, 15 miles (24 km) southeast of the city; at the latter, an oil rig trailer and winch were used to haul materials up the site.

KTAB began broadcasting on October 6, 1979. It took the cable slot previously occupied by KDFW. It benefited in its first year from the Cowboys and a strong performance by the CBS network.

When KTAB signed on, KRBC had led the Abilene market's news ratings by a wide margin, obtaining as much as 80 percent of the audience, but by 1983, KTAB had edged ahead of KRBC in news viewership. The Minneapolis-based International Broadcasting Corporation, owned by businessman Thomas Scallen, acquired KTAB in 1984, netting Terry a handsome return on his investment of just five years prior. Under the new owners, KTAB's news ratings continued to grow. By 1985, KTAB had firmly established itself as the Abilene market's news leader and one of the strongest CBS affiliates in the country. Its 10 p.m. newscast was attracting a 52 percent share, among the highest in the nation, and its noon and 6 p.m. newscasts led in their time slots. Among all areas of dominant influence ranked above 100 with three network affiliates, per a Television/Radio Age analysis of Arbitron data from November 1985, only six stations posted higher news ratings.

Shamrock Broadcasting, Roy E. Disney's broadcasting company, bought the station in 1986. Under Shamrock, KTAB continued to be the news leader in Abilene, though KTXS made inroads with younger viewers and won more regional awards. In August 1995, channel 32 became a secondary affiliate of UPN.

Shamrock announced in 1990 that it intended to sell KTAB-TV, KXXV in Waco, and three radio stations, though it took years for Shamrock to sell the Abilene station. By 1996, it was Shamrock's last broadcasting property; the company put KTAB-TV on the market again because Roy E. Disney was joining the board of ABC as part of The Walt Disney Company's acquisition of the network and KTAB would thus count against ABC's ownership cap. The station was sold to ShootingStar Inc., a company controlled by Diane Sutter, who had headed the television stations division of Shamrock; Alta Communications then acquired 81 percent of KTAB from ShootingStar.

Nexstar Broadcasting Group purchased KTAB-TV from Alta Communications and ShootingStar in 1999. The station continued to lead with its newscasts, but it faced a growing challenge from KTXS in the years after the purchase. KTAB's 6 and 10 p.m. newscasts still won their time slots, but KTXS experienced growth in mornings and among younger, more desirable demographics, as well as in total-day ratings, where it managed to edge out KTAB for the first time in a non-Olympics rating period since at least 1994.

In 2003, Nexstar acquired the assets of KRBC-TV, with Mission Broadcasting assuming the license and outsourcing much of the station's operation to Nexstar under joint sales and shared services agreements for a monthly fee. The stations—along with KACB, KRBC's semi-satellite in San Angelo—came under one news director, though the stations continued to have separate anchors and reporters for their newscasts. The next year, KTAB moved up 14th Street into the KRBC-TV studios; though KRBC had the older building, it also had unused space from when KRBC radio existed. At the same time, Nexstar acquired KLST in San Angelo and consolidated traffic—the scheduling and logging for commercials—for the San Angelo stations in Abilene.

In 2014, KTAB added Telemundo to its 32.2 digital subchannel, three years after low-power station KTES-LP dropped the network in 2011 to join This TV.

Nexstar acquired Tegna—owner of Fox affiliate KXVA (channel 15)—in a deal announced in August 2025 and completed on March 19, 2026.

== Subchannels ==
KTAB-TV is broadcast from a tower in Callahan County. Its signal is multiplexed:

Subchannels of KTAB-TV
Subchannel	Res.	Short name	Programming
32.1	1080i	KTAB-DT	CBS
32.2	1080i	KTABDT2	Telemundo
32.3	480i	Escape	Ion Mystery
32.4	480i	Ion	Ion
