= KWTV-DT =

Television station in Oklahoma City

- Oklahoma City, Oklahoma; United States
- Channels: Digital: 25 (UHF); Virtual: 9
- Branding: News 9; News 9 Now (9.2)

Programming
- Affiliations: 9.1: CBS; 9.2: News 9 Now

Ownership
- Owner: Griffin Media; (Griffin Licensing, LLC)
- Sister stations: KSBI

History
- First air date: December 20, 1953
- Former call signs: KWTV (1953–2009)
- Former channel numbers: Analog: 9 (VHF, 1953–2009); Digital: 39 (UHF, 2003–2009 and 2010–2018), 9 (VHF, 2009–2010)
- Former affiliations: Paramount (secondary, 1953–1956)
- Call sign meaning: World's Tallest Video; (in reference to its former broadcast tower, which once held the record for the world's tallest transmission tower; the tower was decommissioned in 2009 and dismantled in 2014)

Technical information
- Licensing authority: FCC
- Facility ID: 25382
- ERP: 748 kW
- HAAT: 478 m (1,568 ft)
- Transmitter coordinates: 35°35′52.1″N 97°29′23.2″W
- Translator(s): see § Subchannels

Links
- Public license information: Public file; LMS
- Website: www.news9.com

KWTV-DT (channel 9) is a television station in Oklahoma City, Oklahoma, United States, affiliated with CBS. It is the flagship broadcast property of locally based Griffin Media, and is sister to KSBI (channel 52), an independent station with MyNetworkTV. The two stations share studios on West Main Street in downtown Oklahoma City; KWTV-DT's transmitter is located on the city's northeast side.

== History ==
=== Early history ===
John Toole "J. T." Griffin—the owner and president of the Griffin Grocery Company, a Muskogee-based wholesaler and manufacturer of condiments and baking products, states that he inherited from his father, John Taylor Griffin, after the elder company co-founder died in 1944—became interested in television broadcasting around 1950, after noticing during one of his commutes that many homes in the Oklahoma City area had installed outdoor antennas to receive the signal of primary NBC affiliate WKY-TV (channel 4, now KFOR-TV), the first television station ever to sign on in Oklahoma, which began operation on June 6, 1949. In an effort to secure a grant to operate a television station in Oklahoma City, Griffin—who first entered the broadcasting industry in October 1938, when he purchased local radio station KOMA (1520 AM, now KOKC) from Hearst Radio for $315,000—filed competing construction permit/license applications to the Federal Communications Commission (FCC) under two separate companies in which he held ownership interests.

On September 5, 1951, the Oklahoma Television Corporation—a consortium led by Griffin (who, along with sister Marjory Griffin Leake and brother-in-law James C. Leake, became the company's majority owners in July 1952, with a collective 92.7% controlling interest) and investors that included former Oklahoma Governor Roy J. Turner, company executive vice president Edgar T. Bell (who would later serve as channel 9's first general manager), and Video Independent Theatres president Henry Griffing (who acted as a trustee on behalf of the regional movie theater operator)—filed an application for a construction permit to build and license to operate a television station on VHF channel 9. On June 27, 1952, KOMA Inc., a licensee corporation of KOMA radio that was largely owned by Griffin and the Leakes, filed a separate application to operate channel 9. The FCC eventually granted the license to the Oklahoma Television Corporation on July 22, 1953, after the company struck an agreement with KOMA Inc. days prior to merge their respective bids, in exchange for KOMA purchasing 50% of the shares in Oklahoma Television that were owned by that group's original principal investors. (Under FCC procedure, the commission's Broadcast Bureau board decided on license proposals filed by "survivor" applicants at the next scheduled meeting following the withdrawal of a competing bid.) Instead of using the KOMA calls assigned to the radio station, the Griffin group chose instead to request KWTV (for "World's Tallest Video") as the television station's call letters, in reference to the transmission tower that was being built behind its studio facility (which was also under construction at the time) on open land near Northeast 74th Street and North Kelley Avenue; the land plot was purchased by KOMA in 1950, with the intention of developing it for a television broadcast facility. (KOMA would vacate its facilities at the now-demolished Biltmore Hotel in downtown Oklahoma City once the Kelley Avenue building was completed.)

After conducting initial test pattern transmissions beginning on December 8, KWTV officially signed on the air on December 20, 1953. The station's first broadcast was a special 30-minute ceremony inaugurating channel 9's launch at 7 p.m. that evening, respectively featuring speeches from Griffin, Bell and Turner, announcements of station policies, and an introduction of station stockholders and employees. KWTV was the third and last commercial television station to sign on in the Oklahoma City market during 1953: two UHF stations—KTVQ (channel 25, allocation now occupied by Fox affiliate KOKH-TV), an ABC affiliate that launched on October 28, and KLPR-TV (channel 19, allocation now occupied by Cornerstone Television affiliate KUOT-CD), a DuMont Television Network affiliate that debuted on November 8—would eventually cease operations within three years of their respective debuts. Originally broadcasting daily from 6 a.m. to midnight, channel 9 has been a CBS television affiliate since its debut (WKY-TV aired select CBS programming until November 14); the affiliation owed to KOMA radio's longtime partnership with the CBS Radio Network, which had been affiliated with its then-radio sister since 1929. KWTV also maintained a secondary affiliation with DuMont, from which WKY-TV had also carried selected programs, until the network discontinued operations in August 1956. On October 15, 1956, KWTV began carrying programming from the NTA Film Network; channel 9 served as the programming service's secondary Oklahoma City affiliate, offering a limited schedule of drama and comedy series. (Most of NTA other shows were shown on WKY-TV, while ABC affiliate KGEO-TV only aired its NTA Film Spectacular anthology series.) This relationship lasted until National Telefilm Associates discontinued the service in November 1961, when KWTV became exclusively affiliated with CBS.

Channel 9—which is one of the few television stations in the United States to have had the same callsign, ownership, primary network affiliation and over-the-air channel allocation throughout its history—temporarily transmitted its signal from KOMA's 300-foot (91 m) broadcast tower near the television station's Kelley Avenue studios. KWTV activated its permanent transmission facility in September 1954; at 1,572 feet (479 m), the tower—which cost $650,000 to construct and weighed 525 short tons (476 t)—became the tallest man-made structure and the tallest free-standing broadcast tower in the world at that time. (It would be surpassed for the title in December 1956, when Roswell, New Mexico-based KSWS-TV [now KOBR] activated a 1,610-foot [490 m] guy-wired tower in Caprock, New Mexico.) To commemorate the new tower, an event that KWTV management estimated had 5,000 attendees, an amateur photography competition was held in which the winning pictures of the tower (with photography equipment donated by local camera stores being awarded to the finalists) would be chosen for inclusion in station publicity advertisements. A young Johnny Carson, then the host of the CBS game show Earn Your Vacation, served as master of ceremonies for the tower's dedication. The Oklahoma Educational Television Authority (OETA)—which, per an agreement with the Oklahoma Television Corporation, was granted free use of the land near the KWTV studio and transmitter—became a tenant on the tower in April 1956, when the educational broadcaster's flagship station KETA-TV (channel 13) activated its transmitter. (The tower was decommissioned following the transition of KWTV and KETA to digital-only broadcasts in the spring of 2009, as their digital transmitters were located on a separate tower between 122nd Street and the John Kilpatrick Turnpike; the antenna and the upper half of the tower were physically disassembled by engineers and crane equipment during the summer of 2014, and its remnant sections were imploded that October.) The station relocated its operations into its new Kelley Avenue studio facility on October 17, 1954.

Some of the local programs that channel 9 produced over the years have included the children's program Miss Fran from Storyland, in which host Fran Morris—who hosted the show from 1958 to 1967, during her tenure as KWTV's director of educational programming, before moving to WKY-TV/KTVY to host the similarly formatted Sunday Morning with Miss Fran for an additional 17 years—told children's stories, conducted arts and crafts demonstrations, displayed viewer-submitted artwork on a "storyboard", and occasionally showcased Davey and Goliath animated shorts; The Gaylon Stacy Show, a half-hour morning talk-variety program—whose host had also helmed two other shows during his tenure at KWTV, the Saturday morning children's show Junior Auction and the variety-game show You Name It—that ran from 1960 to 1970, which featured live guests and on-location celebrity interviews; and Foods 'n Focus, a five-minute-long, Oklahoma Natural Gas-produced cooking show hosted by Jane Frye that ran from 1973 to 1977. The Griffin-Leake interests sold KOMA (which, as of 2019, is now owned by Oklahoma City-based Tyler Media) to Radio Oklahoma, Inc.—an investor-owned group led by radio executive Burton Levine—on November 20, 1956, for $342,500, but chose to retain ownership of KWTV.

=== Sole ownership by Griffin ===
In April 1961, Triarko Ltd.—a subsidiary of RKO General—purchased a controlling stake in Video Independent Theatres from the estate of the late Henry Griffing. On paper, the 12.5% interest in KWTV included in the deal effectively gave RKO its fifth VHF television station, putting it at the maximum then allowed under FCC ownership rules (alongside its wholly owned station properties in New York City, Los Angeles, Boston and Memphis as well as a controlling stake in a Canadian station in Windsor, Ontario, that dually served the Detroit market). This created an issue for a then-ongoing and complex transaction in which RKO was to have acquired WRC-TV and WRC-AM-FM (now WTEM and WKYS) in Washington, D.C., from NBC, trade WNAC-TV (now defunct; former channel allocation now occupied by WHDH), WNAC-AM (now WRKO) and WRKO-FM (now WBZ-FM) in Boston to NBC in exchange for the WRCV television and radio stations (now KYW-TV and KYW (AM)) in Philadelphia, and sell the Washington-based WGMS radio stations (now WWRC and WTOP-FM) to Crowell-Collier Broadcasting. Philco—which protested the 1957 license renewal of WRCV-TV-AM to NBC amid questions over the legality of its purchase of the stations from Westinghouse in exchange for WTAM-AM-FM and WNBK television (now WKYC) in Cleveland the year before—took issue with whether RKO's interest in KWTV violated FCC ownership rules. Addressing this, in August 1962, RKO agreed to sell its stake in channel 9 to minority stockholders Roy Turner and Luther Dulaney, increasing their individual interests in the station to 18.75%.

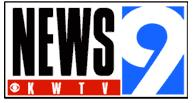
KWTV logo used from February 3, 1997, to October 24, 2010; the "9" in the logo, which resembles that used by KUSA/Denver and WSOC-TV/Charlotte, was first used (without the box framing) in 1988.

On November 29, 1963, the Griffin-Leake interests purchased Turner and Dulaney's 25% interests in KWTV for $200,000 and title rights to the equipment used by KWTV, KTUL and KATV. Turner and Dulaney would then sell the equipment, valued at $2.3 million, to First National Bank of Oklahoma City executives C.A. Voss and James Kite for $3 million. Griffin-Leake's Oklahoma stations would then be folded into KATV parent licensee KATV Inc. (subsequently rechristened as Griffin-Leake TV), which would enter into a ten-year, $4.5 million (or $37,500 per month) agreement with Voss and Kite to lease the equipment. Griffin and the Leakes would own approximately all of the common voting stock and collectively own 84% of nonvoting common shares in KATV Inc. post-merger, with 10% of the remaining nonvoting interest held by Edgar Bell (who would remain KWTV's executive vice president and general manager).

In early 1964, KWTV's Kelley Avenue facility was expanded to include a new 72-by-76-foot (22 m × 23 m) soundstage on the building's west end (which would incorporate transistorized broadcasting and recording equipment), and a separate control room and production facilities. On April 17, 1969, Griffin-Leake TV announced its intent to split its assets into two separate companies. Griffin would retain ownership of KWTV under the rechristened entity that became Griffin Television Inc. (renamed Griffin Communications in 2000 and Griffin Media in 2022), while Leake retained ownership of KATV, KTUL, Ponca City-based cable television operator Cable TV Co. of Oklahoma, and a controlling 80% interest in the construction permit for Fajardo, Puerto Rico, television station WSTE (now WORO-DT) through the spin-off entity Leake TV, Inc. In 1982, with the launch of the overnight news program CBS News Nightwatch, KWTV became the first television station in the Oklahoma City market to maintain a 24-hour programming schedule on weekdays (KTVY had begun maintaining a 24-hour schedule on Fridays and Saturdays in 1978); the station would not adopt a 24-hour schedule regularly until the launch of CBS News Up to the Minute in September 1992.

Ownership of KWTV would transfer to the familial heirs of John Griffin—widow Martha Watson Griffin (who also assumed her husband's post as KWTV board chairman), and sons John W. and David Griffin (both of whom would become KWTV executives in 1990, with David eventually taking over as President of Griffin Communications in 2001)—after he died on July 26, 1985, at the age of 62. That year, KWTV began producing Bingomania (a co-production with Dayton, Ohio–based Prijatel Productions), a half-hour bingo game show—developed as a relaunch of the local program $20,000 Jackpot Bingo, which premiered on the station in September 1985—that was briefly available in limited national syndication through licensing deals with individual stations; after a two-year run, the program was cancelled in 1987. On February 3, 1997, the station—which had branded itself as "TV-9" since 1981—modified its general branding to "KWTV 9" full-time and retitled its newscasts from Newsline 9 to simply News 9, which would be extended to a full-time generalized brand in May 2001.

On October 25, 2010, KWTV became the first television station in the Oklahoma City market to carry syndicated programming and advertisements inserted during local commercial breaks (including station and network promos) in high definition. On September 29, 2014, Griffin purchased then-MyNetworkTV affiliate KSBI (channel 52) from Oklahoma City–based Family Broadcasting Group (owned by a consortium led by former KWTV weekend evening meteorologist Brady Brus, which—under its former name, Christian Media Group—outbid Griffin to purchase KSBI in 2001) for $33.5 million. The transaction was finalized on December 1, 2014, making KWTV and KSBI became the fourth commercial television duopoly in the Oklahoma City market. KSBI subsequently migrated its operations from its studio facility on North Morgan Road in Yukon, into KWTV's Kelley Avenue studios on December 6 of that year. On March 1, 2017, in a move mirroring similar rebrandings made by Fox Television Stations for its MyNetworkTV owned-and-operated and independent stations around this timeframe, Griffin extended KWTV's branding to KSBI under the "News 9 Plus" moniker; Griffin Communications CEO David Griffin said the branding extension was designed to "help create a more inclusive and consistent identity for all of our programming".

=== Move to downtown Oklahoma City studio ===
On July 12, 2021, Griffin Communications announced that it had reached an agreement with real estate development consortium 100 Main LLC to purchase the Century Center business and retail complex in downtown Oklahoma City for $26 million, and construct a media and operations center that would house KWTV/KSBI's broadcast facilities and the company's corporate headquarters inside a vacant 6,750-square-foot (627 m^{2}) section of the space. Griffin invested $10 million to renovate the building (located near several downtown landmarks including the Devon Energy Center, the Paycom Center, the Myriad Botanical Gardens and Prairie Surf Studios), which it originally planned to move into by summer 2022. All existing tenants would continue leasing space in the building. After close to 70 years at its original location, KWTV aired its final newscast from the North Kelley Avenue facility on the morning of November 12, 2022; it resumed local production of its newscasts from the new downtown studio on West Main Street the following evening. (Most of the station's newscasts that weekend were simulcast from Tulsa sister station KOTV, with weather segments incorporating forecasts for the Oklahoma City and Tulsa markets.) The former Kelley Avenue facility was donated to the Langston University Department of Communications for its broadcast journalism program, while continuing to host the station's Doppler radar system and heliport for SkyNews9 under a lease agreement.

== Programming ==
Since its 1953 sign-on, KWTV has periodically preempted or given tape-delayed clearances to some CBS programs to air local, syndicated or special event programs. However, CBS usually did not raise objections to preemptions made by channel 9, since it has typically been one of the network's strongest affiliates. Until 1959, KWTV preempted the CBS Evening News with Douglas Edwards to air syndicated drama series. The station also preempted CBS News Sunday Morning and Face the Nation from September 1984 until August 1995, in favor of carrying an extended block of local and syndicated religious programs on Sunday mornings; from the time they regained clearance until 2005, both programs were shown on a half-hour delay to accommodate an additional half-hour of the station's Sunday morning newscast.

=== Sports programming ===
Seven years before Griffin Communications acquired the latter station, KWTV and KOTV in Tulsa partnered to simulcast three games involving the state's two Central Hockey League franchises, the Oklahoma City Blazers and the Tulsa Oilers, during the league's 1993–94 regular season; the respective sports directors of both stations at that time, Bill Teegins and John Walls, conducted play-by-play for the broadcasts, with KWTV sports anchor Ed Murray (who would later become a news anchor in 1999, and remain in that role until his retirement from television news in 2013) doing color commentary. From 2000 to 2011, KWTV served as the broadcast home for Oklahoma State Cowboys and Cowgirls basketball games under an agreement with Oklahoma State University's Cowboys Sports Network syndication service; the station typically broadcast around three regular season games each year during the run of the contract, which usually aired on a Wednesday or Saturday during prime time.

In August 2013, channel 9 obtained the local television rights to broadcast NFL preseason games involving the St. Louis Rams produced by the team's in-house syndication service, the Rams Television Network; for the 2015 season, KWTV diverted broadcasts of the team's Thursday night preseason games to sister station KSBI. (Prior to its acquisition of channel 52, the Thursday games forced KWTV to air first-run episodes of the CBS reality series Big Brother in late night to allow viewers to watch or record the affected episode on a delayed basis.) KWTV/KSBI's contract with the Rams concluded after the 2015 season as a result of the team's move to Los Angeles effective the following year. (Ironically, most Rams regular season games air on Fox affiliate KOKH-TV by way of Fox's contractual rights to the NFL's National Football Conference, while KWTV only carried regular season games featuring the team if CBS was scheduled to carry an interconference games against an opponent in the American Football Conference, or after 2014, an NFC-only matchup to which Fox passed the rights to CBS under NFL cross-flex broadcasting provisions.)

On July 24, 2015, Griffin announced an agreement with the Oklahoma Secondary School Activities Association (OSSAA) that would return high school football coverage to KSBI after a five-year sabbatical; as a byproduct of the deal, KWTV also maintained partial over-the-air rights to the OSSAA Class 5A and 6A football championships, which were split between the station's main channel, its News 9 Now subchannel and KSBI.

=== News department history ===
Channel 9's news department began operations when the station signed on the air on December 20, 1953, when it debuted a half-hour newscast at 10 p.m. (broken up, respectively, into 15-minute-long weather and news segments), anchored by Mark Weaver. Bruce Palmer, former news director at WKY and eventual national president of the Radio-Television News Editors Association, headed channel 9's news department as its director of news operations until his retirement from broadcasting in 1966. Palmer also conducted weekly editorial segments that dealt with pertinent local issues; the station's editorials, which continued for several years after Palmer's departure, would help earn KWTV several journalistic honors in subsequent years, including the Sigma Delta Chi Award and the National Headliners Club Award. To enable mobility in shooting spot news content, in 1955, KWTV staff photographer Bill Horton devised a saddle-based shoulder camera rig with a port to insert wet cell batteries on the saddle's rear and an Auricon Cine-Voice audio control panel (which was hooked to a dictaphone-style earpiece to monitor the audio recording) at front. By 1959, the station had launched a half-hour noon newscast and a 15-minute-long early evening newscast that led into the CBS Evening News. KWTV is purported to be the first television station in the Oklahoma City market to conduct consumer and investigative reporting, the first to utilize beat reporters, and was the first television station in the United States to air a consumer-investigative news program, Call for Action, which was based on a KOMA radio show of the same title.

In 1962, assignment reporter Ed Turner received accolades for a series of reports on James Meredith, who in October of that year, became the first African American to enroll into and attend the University of Mississippi and whose entry led to civil unrest and rioting at the campus. In 1968, the station hired Paul R. Lehman as a weekend anchor and assignment reporter, becoming the first African American to work as a television reporter in the Oklahoma City market; given the lingering racial climate in the southern United States after the passage of the Civil Rights Act, Lehman's appointment was not without controversy, as some viewers who were displeased with his appointment called into the station's phone switchboard to complain, some of whom went so far as to lodge death threats against him. Lehman co-created and hosted a community affairs show aimed at black audiences, Soul Talk, for the station in 1969.

Upon KWTV's rebranding of its newscasts as Newsroom 9 on September 13, 1971, as the Prime Time Access Rule (an FCC regulatory act that reduced the prime time schedules of the three major networks, which previously ran for 3 1/2 hours, by 30 minutes) was being instituted, KWTV launched Oklahoma City's first hour-long 6 p.m. newscast, adding an additional half-hour to its existing early evening newscast, predating the expansion of KFOR-TV's 6 p.m. to an hour-long broadcast by 24 years. In November 1972, urban affairs reporter Andrew Fisher—while covering a staff briefing that followed the commission's monthly meeting—interviewed Oklahoma Securities Commission chairman Charles E. McCune about a security registration requirement for Los Angeles–based commodities broker Goldstein, Samuelson, Inc. McCune made an anti-Semitic comment regarding the company's fitness for operation based on its name and, later, with full knowledge he was being recorded by Fisher, said "I think they are Jewish and I think that they are skunks—the name and what they've done," when asked what prompted the earlier remark. The interview led to his resignation (called upon by then-Governor David Hall) following the broadcast of the remark on the station's newscasts. H. Martin "Marty" Haag, who oversaw the news department at that time, left KWTV in 1973; that year, he brought over three of the station's top-tier reporters, Tracy Rowlett, Doug Fox and Byron Harris, to his new job as news director at WFAA in Dallas-Fort Worth as part of his successful effort to strengthen that station's news operation.

In 1976, Pam Olson became the first woman to anchor a local evening news program in the Oklahoma City market, when she was paired alongside Jerry Adams (who would later anchor at KTVY and KOCO-TV during the 1980s) on the 6 p.m. newscast. Olson's tenure at the station saw the airing of a documentary she wrote and produced in cooperation with the National Kidney Foundation, Gift of Life, which chronicled four kidney dialysis patients awaiting transplants; the special led to the passage of a state law that created an organ donor registry and donor ID information on Oklahoma identification cards and drivers' licenses. On September 18, 1978, the station split its early evening newscasts into two half-hour programs at 5 and 6 p.m., bookending the 5:30 p.m. airing of the CBS Evening News, the former of which was the first 5 p.m. newscast to debut in the Oklahoma City market; also on that date, KWTV launched an hour-long 11:30 a.m. newscast.

In 1979, the station began utilizing a helicopter to provide coverage of breaking news events and severe weather, with the introduction of "Hot Shot 9". A rotational camera was installed below the nose of the chopper (branded as "EagleVision") in 2000, superseding the need for an in-helicopter cameraman to film breaking news. The helicopter used for KWTV was sold to KOTV to replace its previous helicopter model in 2006, when KWTV purchased a $1.5-million Bell 407 helicopter, branded as "SkyNews9 HD" (now branded "Bob Mills SkyNews9 HD", through a sponsorship and brand licensing agreement with Oklahoma City-based regional furniture retail chain Bob Mills Furniture), which was the first in the market to be equipped with a high-definition camera that also has optical zoom capability. On April 30, 2025, N9TV had crash-landed at Wiley Post Airport, with no injuries.

Ratings for KWTV's newscasts—then branded as Big 9 News, dropped to third place in 1980, partly due to a resurgent KOCO news operation, which overtook it for second place among the market's evening newscasts with the team of Jack Bowen, Mary Ruth Carleton, chief meteorologist Fred Norman and sports director Jerry Park. The station enacted a series of staffing changes to shore up its news viewership, resulting in the firings of longtime anchors Bert Rudman and Phil Schuman, and reporter Debra Lane during the early 1980s. Replacing Adams and Faubion on the 6 and 10 p.m. newscasts were Roger Cooper and Patti Suarez, who, alongside chief meteorologist Gary England and sports director Jim Miller (later replaced by the fall of 1981 by John Snyder, who had previously served as KWTV's sports director in the mid-to-late 1970s), led channel 9 to an intense battle with and, by the mid-1980s, eventually overtake KTVY for the top ratings spot in evening news. Channel 9 also poached several former KOCO personalities in 1984, amid a massive staff restructuring at channel 5 under newly appointed vice president of news operations Gary Long. They were later followed by the arrival of another KOCO anchor, Jack Bowen, who replaced Cooper as evening co-anchor in 1987. In 1986, KWTV rolled out a satellite news-gathering unit, "Newstar 9" a transportable video uplink system that the station used to cover news and weather events around and outside of Oklahoma. The station became the third and last television station in Oklahoma City to launch a weekend morning newscast in July 1993, with the debut of a two-hour Saturday broadcast from 6 to 8 a.m.; the program was joined by a Sunday edition in September 1995.

Kelly Ogle joined KWTV as a business/investigative reporter and midday news anchor in 1990; his family has primarily been associated with KFOR-TV since his father, Jack Ogle, served as an anchor (and later, news director) at channel 4 from 1962 to 1977, although had a prior association with channel 9 through occasional commentary pieces that Jack conducted for the station into the 1980s.

On October 24, 2010, KWTV became the second television station in the Oklahoma City market to begin broadcasting its local newscasts in high definition. On January 24, 2011, KWTV expanded its weekday morning newscasts with the addition of a third hour of the program at 4 a.m.

In February 2016, KWTV launched "Drone 9", a quadcopter—the first to be used for newsgathering purposes in the Oklahoma City market—that would be used to provide aerial footage as a supplement to "Bob Mills SkyNews9 HD". Likewise, sister station KOTV subsequently deployed a quadcopter branded as "Drone 6". On July 14, 2016, KWTV announced the implementation of "StreetScope", an Augmented Reality System developed by Churchill Navigation that overlays street and building names over live footage from the station's helicopter camera during breaking news and severe weather events; it is the first television station in the United States to use this technology.

==== Weather coverage ====
KWTV places a significant emphasis on weather, and has long been considered to be a pioneer in severe weather coverage and television forecasting technology. Most of these advances were attributed to Seiling native Gary England, who was often referred to as "Oklahoma's #1 meteorologist" in station promotions and newscast introductions for most of his tenure with channel 9. England holds the record as the state's longest-serving television meteorologist, working as chief meteorologist at KWTV from October 16, 1972, until his retirement from regular broadcasting on August 28, 2013, shortly before he assumed a newly created post as Griffin Communications' vice president of corporate relations and weather development. England—who, in 1986, would become the first Oklahoma City television personality to sign a million-dollar contract package—replaced David Grant, who succeeded original chief meteorologist Harry Volkman (whose tenure also saw channel 9 become the first station in Oklahoma City to acquire a weather radar) in 1960. England's weather coverage earned him numerous awards over his 41-year career with the station (including three Heartland Emmys, National and Regional Edward R. Murrow Awards and a Silver Circle Award, most notably for KWTV's coverage of a tornado outbreak that produced an intense F5 tornado that devastated portions of Moore and Bridge Creek on May 3, 1999).

In 1973, England enlisted ham radio operators to serve as on-scene observationalists during severe weather situations, using a self-diagramed chart of central Oklahoma (divided into 1-mile [1.6 km] square diagrams) and an alphanumeric coding system he developed for the operators to relay their location. That February, Griffin purchased a World War II-era radar (similar in model to the WSR-57) from Huntsville, Alabama–based Enterprise Electronics Corporation, the first proprietary broadcast weather radar in the U.S. (four years later, KWTV became the first television station in Oklahoma to have its own color weather radar). It was first utilized to detect a violent F4 tornado that caused extensive damage in Union City on May 24, 1973 (the original film footage from the accompanying televised warning was featured in station-produced weather promos in later years). England lamented the lack of warning lead time, specifically for tornado warnings. In 1978, KWTV became the first television station in the U.S. to broadcast high-resolution weather satellite imagery.

In 1990, England, with the help of a station technician, co-developed First Warning, a software product that displays a weather alert map (which was originally updated via manual input by weather staff) during regular programming, along with a crawl showing detailed alerts issued by the NWS and the National Severe Storms Forecast Center. ("First Alert", an automated iteration of the software, was developed by KOCO that same year.) In 1991, England convinced station management to hire a software development firm to create an application, which would be dubbed "Storm Tracker", an automated computer tracking system that projected the arrival time of precipitation at a particular locale. That year also saw the hiring of Val Castor, a studio camera operator who would eventually become the station's first in-house storm spotter; KWTV gradually expanded its spotter units, employing twelve teams by 1999.

In 1998, KWTV became one of the first stations in the United States to introduce a model-based computer forecasting system with the introduction of "MAX", which compiled model data to display hour-by-hour forecasts up to 48 hours in advance.

==== Notable current on-air staff ====
- Dusty Dvoracek – football analyst
- David Payne (AMS and NWA Seals of Approval) – chief meteorologist; weekdays at 4 and weeknights at 5, 6 and 10 p.m.

==== Notable former on-air staff ====
- Dean Blevins – sports director; co-host of Oklahoma Sports Blitz (1997–2025)
- Mike Boettcher – reporter (1978–1980)
- Gary England – chief meteorologist (1972–2013)
- Shon Gables – weekend morning anchor/reporter (1998–2001)
- Chris Harrison – weekend sports anchor/reporter (1993–1999)
- Lauren Nelson – 4 p.m. anchor (2010–2013)
- Frances Rivera – reporter (1999–2001)
- Tracy Rowlett – anchor/reporter (1970–1974)
- Ed Turner – reporter/news director (1960–1966)
- Harry Volkman – chief meteorologist (1954–1960)
- Bob "Hoolihan" Wells – announcer (1957–1959)

== Technical information ==
=== Subchannels ===
The station's signal is multiplexed:

Subchannels of KWTV-DT
Subchannel	Res.	Short name	Programming
9.1	1080i	News9	CBS
9.2	720p	News9 N	News 9 Now

=== Analog-to-digital conversion and spectrum repack ===
KWTV-DT began transmitting a digital television signal on UHF channel 39 on December 23, 2003. The station ended regular programming on its analog signal, over VHF channel 9, on February 17, 2009, as part of the federally mandated transition from analog to digital television (which Congress had moved the previous month to June 12). The station's digital signal relocated from its pre-transition UHF channel 39 to VHF channel 9. Due to reception issues in parts of central Oklahoma, KWTV was granted permission by the FCC to operate a secondary signal on its former UHF digital channel 39 under special temporary authorization in October 2009, mapped to virtual channel 9.2. On March 9, 2010, the FCC issued a Report & Order, approving the station's request to move its digital signal from channel 9 to channel 39.

On April 20, 2010, KWTV filed a minor change application on its new channel 39 allotment, that was granted on June 10. Short-lived service interruptions began on July 29 to allow viewers to rescan their digital tuners to carry the UHF channel 39 signal. On August 16, 2010, the digital signal on UHF channel 39 added a virtual channel on 9.1, in addition to the 9.2 channel. KWTV terminated its digital signal on channel 9 and began to operate only on channel 39 on August 30, 2010, at 12:30 p.m.

As a part of the repacking process following the 2016–17 FCC incentive auction, KWTV-DT relocated its physical digital allocation to UHF channel 25 at noon on November 27, 2018, although it continued to display its virtual channel number as 9. In preparation for the repack, KWTV began operating test signals of their main and subchannel on channel 25 (temporarily mapped to virtual channels 9.3 and 9.4) on October 1, 2018; the UHF 25 test feed was converted into a simulcast of KWTV-DT1 and -DT2 (remapped to 9.1 and 9.2, respectively) on October 30, only for the simulcast to be embargoed from November 2 to 19 to comply with FCC regulations limiting the duration of simulcasts on transitional digital television signals.

=== Translators ===
KWTV-DT is additionally rebroadcast over a network of nine low-power digital translator stations:

- K15HL-D Cherokee & Alva*
- K31JW-D Elk City
- K35KE-D Hollis
- K25JQ-D May, etc.*
- K14NY-D Sayre
- K21MT-D Seiling*
- K27JO-D Strong City
- K14MU-D Weatherford
- K29HZ-D Woodward, etc.*

*Although it relays programming from KWTV, this translator is owned and operated by Nexstar Media Group, owner of NBC affiliate KFOR-TV and CW affiliate KAUT-TV.
