= Griffin Television Tower Oklahoma =

Tower in Oklahoma, US

Griffin Television Tower Oklahoma (also known as the KWTV mast) was a 480.5-metre-high (1,576 ft) guy-wired aerial mast for the transmission of two television stations in Oklahoma City, Oklahoma, United States (Geographical coordinates: 35°32′58″N 97°29′50″W) built during 1954. The stations which transmitted from the tower were KWTV and KETA. It was the tallest structure in the world at the time it was built, and it was the first structure to surpass the Empire State Building in height. The tower featured multiple levels of double guy wires to protect it against severe wind storms. During 1956, KOBR-TV Tower in Caprock, New Mexico, became the world's tallest structure. The tower was deconstructed during 2015.

== See also ==
- List of masts

Records
Preceded by Empire State Building	World's tallest structure 1,576.4 ft (480.5 m); 1954–1956	Succeeded by KOBR-TV Tower
Preceded by Forestport Tower	World's tallest tower 1954–1956	Succeeded by KOBR-TV Tower
