= KTAQ =

KTAQ may refer to:

- KTAQ-LP, a low-power radio station (97.7 FM) licensed to serve Sandpoint, Idaho, United States
- KTXD-TV, a television station (channel 46, virtual 47) licensed to serve Greenville, Texas, United States, which held the call sign KTAQ from 1988 to 2011
