= KTXD =

KTXD could refer to:

- KTXD-LP, a low power Television station licensed to Amarillo, Texas, United States
- KTXD-TV, a television station licensed to Greenville, Texas, United States formerly named KTAQ-TV
