= KTXD-TV =

Television station in Greenville, Texas

- Greenville–Dallas–Fort Worth, Texas; United States
- City: Greenville, Texas
- Channels: Digital: 23 (UHF); Virtual: 47

Programming
- Affiliations: 47.1: Estrella TV; for others, see § Subchannels

Ownership
- Owner: Cunningham Broadcasting; (Greenville (KTXD-TV) Licensee, Inc.)

History
- First air date: April 1, 1994
- Former call signs: KTAQ (1994–2011)
- Former channel numbers: Analog: 47 (UHF, 1994–2009); Digital: 46 (UHF, 2002–2019)
- Former affiliations: The Jewelry Network/Shop at Home (1994–2000); ACN (2000–2004); ShopNBC (2004–2006); Promiseland Television Network (2006–2010); Infomercials (2010–2012); MeTV (part-time, 2012–2013); Independent (2013–2018); Stadium (2018–2023); TBD (2023–2024, now Roar on 47.5); Merit TV (2024–March 2026); Roar (March–July 2026)
- Call sign meaning: Texas Dallas

Technical information
- Licensing authority: FCC
- Facility ID: 42359
- ERP: 1,000 kW
- HAAT: 494.2 m (1,621 ft)
- Transmitter coordinates: 32°35′22″N 96°58′12.9″W

Links
- Public license information: Public file; LMS
- Website: texas47.com

KTXD-TV (channel 47) is a television station licensed to Greenville, Texas, United States, serving the Dallas–Fort Worth metroplex as an affiliate of the Spanish-language network Estrella TV. The station is owned by Cunningham Broadcasting, a partner company of Sinclair Broadcast Group. Along with carrying programming from Estrella TV on its primary channel, it has four diginets operated by Sinclair, and religious broadcaster SonLife Broadcasting Network. KTXD's studios are located on Inwood Road in Farmers Branch, and its transmitter is located in Cedar Hill, Texas.

The station largely carried home shopping programming from 1994 until 2006, when it began broadcasting religious programming from the Promiseland network. Under the ownership of London Broadcasting, KTXD switched to an entertainment-based format, initially as an affiliate of MeTV, and later as an independent station carrying a mix of classic television series, syndicated programs, and local news and lifestyle programming. KTXD was not included in the sale of most of London Broadcasting's stations to Gannett, resulting in its sale to Cunningham in 2017. In March 2018, Cunningham then flipped KTXD's main channel to sports programming from Sinclair's Stadium network. In 2023, KTXD switched to TBD (now Roar), then to Merit TV in 2024, and then briefly back to Roar in March 2026 before flipping to Estrella TV on July 27, 2026.

== History ==
=== Early years ===
This station first signed on the air on April 1, 1994, as KTAQ. During its early years, the station carried programming from shopping networks such as The Jewelry Network and Shop at Home. In 2000, the station affiliated with the America's Collectibles Network (now Jewelry Television), though most of the shopping programming was relegated to the nighttime hours. In 2004, the station switched to ShopNBC. In late 2006, KTAQ switched to a 24-hour religious programming format as the flagship station of the Promiseland Television Network after being acquired by Promiseland founder Mike Simons (through Simons Broadcasting, LP).

It was reported in February 2007 that KTAQ was fined $10,000 for failing to place its 2005 Biennial Ownership Report, all required TV issues/programs lists, and Children's Television Programming Reports in the station's public inspection file. The station admitted in its license renewal application that during the previous term, it had failed to timely place all of the documentation required by Section 73.3526 of the rules in its public inspection file.

In November 2008, Simons Broadcasting, LP filed for Chapter 11 bankruptcy in the U.S. Bankruptcy Court for the Western District of Texas in Waco. Simons Broadcasting, LP debtor-in-possession sold the station to Platinum Equity, LLC in mid-2010. In early November 2010, KTAQ switched to an infomercial format.

=== Purchase by London Broadcasting ===
Platinum Equity later sold the station to the Addison-based London Broadcasting Company, which changed the station's call sign to KTXD-TV. London Broadcasting retained Continental Television to act as "national and local [advertising] sales" for the station, which suggested that KTXD would adopt a general entertainment format rather than a brokered, or foreign language format. The purchase was completed on January 19, 2012.

On March 16, 2012, KTXD (under the verbal "K-Tex" branding at the time) became an affiliate of MeTV (a digital broadcast network specializing in classic television series, which is nominally carried as a multicast channel in most markets, but is optionally carried as a main channel affiliation in a few cities), carrying its programming part-time on its main channel and MeTV's complete schedule on digital subchannel 47.4. Under London, the station also began to place an emphasis on locally produced lifestyle and entertainment programs.

On October 31, 2013, KTXD declined to renew its affiliation contract with MeTV and dropped the network's programming, which by association, resulted in the 47.4 subchannel going dark. Channel 47 converted to a general entertainment independent station, effectively competing with KTXA (channel 21), featuring local programs as well as a mix of recent and classic television series (including some that have been carried in recent years on MeTV and one of its chief rivals, Antenna TV). The station also acquired the local rights to a Dallas Cowboys regular season road game against the Chicago Bears on December 9, which was part of the ESPN Monday Night Football package. MeTV would return to the Dallas–Fort Worth area on KTXA in December 2013 over a new second digital subchannel.

Final KTXD logo as an independent until March 2018.

On May 14, 2014, the Gannett Company announced the purchase of KTXD's sister stations KCEN, KYTX, KIII, KBMT, KXVA, and KIDY for $215 million. London exempted KTXD and Longview sister station KCEB from the deal. In the case of KTXD, the company's retention of KTXD was decided by management; Gannett's existing ownership of ABC affiliate WFAA (channel 8), which was acquired in 2013 as part of the company's merger with Belo), did not play a factor as the Dallas–Fort Worth market has 18 full-power television stations, enough to allow a fourth duopoly (or even a true triopoly), and neither did the FCC's newspaper-broadcast cross-ownership restrictions as Gannett did not own a newspaper within the market.

=== Sale to Cunningham Broadcasting ===
On September 15, 2017, London agreed to sell KTXD-TV to Cunningham Broadcasting, a partner company of Sinclair Broadcast Group, for $9.5 million. Sinclair, which at the time was seeking to acquire KDAF (channel 33) as part of its merger with Tribune Media (which was abandoned on August 9, 2018), indicated that it intended to use KTXD as a lighthouse station during the transition to the ATSC 3.0 broadcast standard. The sale was completed on January 11, 2018.

On March 7, 2018, KTXD replaced its general entertainment format with programming from Sinclair-owned digital network Stadium. There was no formal announcement of the programming change, except on Stadium's Facebook page, welcoming viewers in the Dallas area.

On October 30, 2023, Sinclair converted Stadium's over-the-air service into The Nest, a network that currently features reruns of home improvement, true crime, reality and celebrity-driven shows. KTXD-TV, however, switched affiliations to TBD, bringing the diginet to the station's main signal from its 47.4 subchannel, swapping The Nest to that particular spot.

Sometime in April 2024, KTXD-TV affiliated with Merit TV. TBD (now Roar as of April 2025) was then relocated once again to subchannel 47.5.

In March 2026, KTXD-TV was subsequently flipped back to Roar (while still on 47.5), leaving Merit TV available on KDTX-TV (58.2).

On July 27, 2026, KTXD-DT1 would flip from Roar to Estrella TV after KFAA-DT2 affiliated with Hot 97 TV, marking the first time Estrella TV would switch its affiliation in the DFW area.

== Programming ==
Upon adopting an entertainment-based schedule, the station began carrying MeTV programming on its main channel from 9 a.m. to 11:30 p.m. weekdays, and from 1 p.m. to midnight on weekends. The network was later expanded to 7:30 a.m. to 12:30 a.m. on weekdays and noon to 11 p.m. on Sundays, and reduced to 5 to 10 p.m. on Saturdays.

From the time MeTV programming was dropped until March 7, 2018, classic television series were added to the schedule, alongside some more recent and barter syndicated programs, giving the station a format mildly similar to KFWD (channel 52, now a SonLife Broadcasting Network affiliate)'s format during its years as an English language independent station. The remainder of KTXD's schedule consisted of locally produced programs on weekdays; syndicated E/I programming on Saturday mornings as well as local interest programming, college sporting events in the afternoon hours on Saturdays; along with religious programming and infomercials. The overnight hours from 2 a.m. to 5 a.m. were occupied by programs from AMGTV.

=== Local programming ===
On July 20, 2012, KTXD announced that it would launch an hour-long news and commentary program called The Texas Daily; the program featured several veteran news anchors and reporters formerly seen on KDFW (channel 4), KXAS-TV (channel 5), WFAA (channel 8) and KTVT (channel 11) – including John Criswell, Troy Dungan, Iola Johnson and Tracy Rowlett. The Texas Daily debuted on October 1, 2012, and featured stories relevant to Dallas-Fort Worth and Texas as well as national and international news reports from CNN's affiliate news service CNN Newssource.

Originally airing at 8 a.m., the program moved to 6 p.m. the following year with a rebroadcast airing at 9:30 p.m. being added. The station canceled The Texas Daily on March 19, 2014, citing low viewership (registering ratings that were marginal or at times, too low to register a measurable ratings point) and that the program "has been difficult to sell advertising into". The last edition of the program aired two days later, and was replaced with syndicated reruns of America's Funniest Home Videos. The station also produced the weekend sports program DFW Sports Beat, hosted by Brady Tinker and Everson Walls, which featured interviews and discussions on area sports; the program was also canceled in early 2014.

In September 2012, KTXD debuted a talk and lifestyle program titled The Broadcast (originally titled D: The Broadcast until D Magazine dropped their sponsorship of the program in September 2013), which originally aired at noon; the program, which features a panel format similar to the network daytime talk shows The View and The Talk, was moved to 9 a.m. and expanded to two hours upon the cancellation of The Texas Daily in March 2014; the program, which like most of KTXD's local programs has experienced low ratings locally, received national attention in May 2014 after co-host Amy Kushnir walked off the set during a heated discussion about controversial remarks from some football players regarding a moment televised on ESPN during the 2014 NFL draft in which openly gay player Michael Sam was kissed his boyfriend on-camera after being selected by the St. Louis Rams. The Broadcast was finally canceled in March 2015. On May 6, 2013, the station began carrying a television simulcast of The Mark Davis Morning Show, from KSKY (660 AM), on weekdays from 7 to 9 a.m. It was canceled in December 2014.

==== Notable former on-air staff ====
- Troy Dungan – contributor for The Texas Daily (2012–2013)
- Iola Johnson – contributor for The Texas Daily (2012–2014)
- Tracy Rowlett – contributor for The Texas Daily (2012–2014)

== Technical information ==
=== Subchannels ===
The station's signal is multiplexed:

Subchannels of KTXD-TV
Subchannel	Res.	Short name	Programming
47.1	1080i	Estrela	Estrella TV
47.2	1080i	COMET	Comet
47.3	480i	CHARGE	Charge!
47.4	480i	NEST	The Nest
47.5	480i	ROAR	Roar
47.6	480i	SBN	SonLife

=== Analog-to-digital conversion ===
KTXD-TV shut down its analog signal, over UHF channel 47, on June 12, 2009, as part of the federally mandated transition from analog to digital television. The station's digital signal remained on its pre-transition UHF channel 46, using virtual channel 47.

KTXD's original analog transmitter was located in Greenville. After the digital transition, the station's transmitter moved to the Cedar Hill antenna farm. Because the digital transmitter site is over 63 miles (101 km) from the Greenville site, over 90,000 viewers in that area no longer receive the station. However, the new digital signal covers the entire Dallas–Fort Worth metro area, resulting in a net change in population covered from 1,364,801 persons (for its analog signal) to 5,306,750 (for its digital signal).
