= KOBR =

Television station in Roswell, New Mexico

Satellite of KOB, Albuquerque, New Mexico
- Roswell–Carlsbad, New Mexico; United States
- City: Roswell, New Mexico
- Channels: Digital: 8 (VHF); Virtual: 8
- Branding: KOBR 8

Programming
- Affiliations: 8.1: NBC; for others, see § Subchannels

Ownership
- Owner: Hubbard Broadcasting; (KOB-TV, LLC)

History
- First air date: June 24, 1953
- Former call signs: KSWS-TV (1953–1985)
- Former channel numbers: Analog: 8 (VHF, 1953–2009); Digital: 38 (UHF, until 2009)
- Former affiliations: All secondary: DuMont (1953–1955); CBS (1953–1956); ABC (1953–1966); PBS (1983–c. 1984)
- Call sign meaning: "KOB Roswell"

Technical information
- Licensing authority: FCC
- Facility ID: 62272
- ERP: 40 kW
- HAAT: 533 m (1,749 ft)
- Transmitter coordinates: 33°22′31″N 103°46′12″W
- Translator(s): see § Translators

Links
- Public license information: Public file; LMS
- Website: kob.com

KOBR (channel 8) is a television station licensed to Roswell, New Mexico, United States, affiliated with NBC. It is a satellite of Albuquerque-based KOB (channel 4) which is owned by Hubbard Broadcasting. KOBR's transmitter is located near Caprock, New Mexico.

KOBF (channel 12) in Farmington also serves as a satellite of KOB. These satellite operations provide additional news bureaus for KOB and sell advertising time to local sponsors.

== History ==
=== As a separate station ===
On March 28, 1952, oilman John A. Barnett filed an application for a new television station on channel 8 in Roswell. Barnett then became owner of radio station KSWS (1230 AM) when he purchased the station in November from Paul McEvoy. On January 28, 1953, the Federal Communications Commission (FCC) granted the TV construction permit, which matched the radio station by adopting the call letters KSWS-TV. Programs began June 24, 1953; the station held network affiliations with ABC and DuMont, though soon all of the major networks added KSWS-TV as an affiliate. The original studio and transmitter location was at Comanche Peak, east of Roswell.

After the initial facilities were constructed, Barnett was disappointed by the coverage provided from Comanche Peak. He sought a taller tower, and in 1955, the FCC granted a modification to KSWS-TV to move the tower to Caprock, 43 miles (69 km) east of Roswell, where the world's tallest structure at 1,610 feet (490 m) would be erected in late 1956 and early 1957. With the new transmitter facility, the effective radiated power was ramped up to 316 kW, the highest for a full-power VHF analog station; the antenna was 1,786 feet (544 m) above average terrain. Due to its remoteness, three homes were also built at Caprock for engineers and their families. The station moved to new studio facilities at 1717 West Second Street in 1958. The tower fell due to an ice storm in December 1960, and a new 875-foot (267 m) tower was constructed. New facilities at Caprock and Comanche Peak were built. A newer tower was built by 1962; that same year, Barnett and KSWS-TV won more than $500,000 in damages in a jury trial against four insurance firms that had refused to pay out on their policies.

In 1961, Barnett sold KSWS radio to John Burroughs; it became KRSY. A second and more powerful KSWS station, this time at 1020 kHz, went on the air in December 1965. At the same time, however, the competitive picture for the television station changed. In 1956, KSWS-TV had received its first competitor when KAVE-TV (channel 6) signed on in Carlsbad as the CBS affiliate for southeastern New Mexico; it became a regional station when the transmitter was moved to a 1,200-foot (370 m) tower near Artesia in the early 1960s. In February 1966, KBIM-TV (channel 10) signed on in Roswell as the area's new CBS affiliate, broadcasting from a studio in downtown Roswell and over a 1,839-foot (561 m) tower that was just 163 feet (50 m) short of the tallest mast, the KTHI-TV mast in North Dakota. Almost simultaneously with the debut of KBIM, KAVE was sold and became a satellite of ABC affiliate KMOM-TV in Monahans, Texas (now KWES-TV in Midland). With ABC now having a primary affiliate in the area and KBIM becoming the exclusive CBS affiliate for southeastern New Mexico (KSWS retained a secondary affiliation with CBS even after KAVE went on the air), KSWS-TV became an exclusive NBC affiliate.

=== KCBD-TV satellite ===
As KSWS became a sole NBC affiliate in the mid-to-late 1960s, economic problems were emerging in southeastern New Mexico. The potash mines near Carlsbad downscaled activity or closed, and the Walker Air Force Base at Roswell was deactivated in 1967. At the same time, KSWS now faced major competition from KAVE and KBIM, new radio stations, and an expanding cable television system that gave viewers access to TV stations from surrounding areas of New Mexico and west Texas. Added to this series of events, Barnett died on April 30, 1967; he was 59.

After Barnett's death, the station was sold to Lubbock, Texas, businessman Joe Bryant and his company, Caprock Broadcasting, for $490,000 (nearly half of that in KSWS-TV's indebtedness). Bryant turned KSWS into a full-time satellite of Lubbock's KCBD-TV. Combined, the two stations served one of the largest coverage areas in the nation. Two years later, Bryant died in 1970, and State Telecasting Company of Columbia, South Carolina, became the new owner of both KSWS and KCBD in 1971.

A private microwave system was installed between Lubbock and Roswell to link the two stations and programming. The system was very reliable, with good locations, sturdy towers, clear paths, and backup power (large lead acid batteries). The four hops went from the KCBD-TV studio/transmitter tower at 5600 Avenue "A" in Lubbock to a tower at the south edge of Levelland, Texas, to a site near Lehman, Texas (not far from Morton, Texas), to a site near Crossroads, New Mexico, to the actual tower at Caprock. Collins Radio provided the equipment and the system was considered "network grade," meaning that it was comparable to AT&T hops of the day.

During the 1970s KCBD-TV produced a separate newscast for KSWS, aired from the KCBD studios in Lubbock. The New Mexico Report was recorded between KCBD's 6 p.m. and 10 p.m. newscasts (5 p.m. and 9 p.m. on KSWS, which operated in the Mountain Time Zone while KCBD broadcast in the Central Time Zone) and consisted largely of items off the New Mexico wire services. The program aired after Tom Snyder's Tomorrow show and before sign-off on both KSWS-TV and KCBD. Often as not, the same program was repeated at sign-on the next day.

=== KOB-TV satellite ===
State Telecasting decided to sell its Texas broadcast properties in 1983. Holsum Inc., the owners of Roswell CBS affiliate KBIM-TV, made the best bid for KCBD at $10.75 million, but they could not keep KSWS-TV. The station was transferred to KCBD Associates which was headed by W. Robert McKinsey (the longtime general manager of KCBD and KSWS). A planned sale to the Hubbard interests at KOB-TV had to wait until the KSWS license was renewed: the license had been challenged by KGGM-TV, which proposed its own local television station on channel 8.

In May 1983, the sale of KCBD-TV to the KBIM-TV owners closed. KSWS-TV began to operate independently of KCBD, by way of an agreement with New Mexico public television station KENW in Portales, New Mexico. Where KCBD-TV operated as a Central Time Zone station unsuitable for broadcast in a Mountain Time market (one hour earlier than Central), KSWS began to use an NBC feed that came from KOB and was fed over NMPTV microwave to the Portales master control and from there to the Caprock tower. According to listings from the New Mexico edition of TV Guide from this era, most NBC and selected syndicated and news programming originated from KOB-TV, with most of that station's syndicated and sports programming replaced with religious and selected PBS programming (though never popular PBS shows such as Sesame Street or Masterpiece Theatre).

In 1985, a settlement agreement was reached with Western Sun, allowing the KSWS-TV sale to Hubbard to move forward. The station then became KOBR, and KOB set out to expand the station's local news offerings and build a studio. New studios and offices were eventually set up for the renamed KOBR at 124 East 4th Street in Roswell. Local news, weather and sports inserts called Eyewitness News 8 and specific to KOBR viewers were included in portions of the 6 and 10 p.m. newscasts sourced from the Albuquerque station.

KOBR reached its peak of viewership from 1995 through 1998 under the guidance of a team guided by station manager Dorrie Faubus. This group helped to lead the station to the top of the ratings in Roswell, culminating with the "news insert" format during the 6 and 10 p.m. newscasts. This gathered a boost of over 1-point share of viewership to KOB's ratings in the 18-24 demographic. Ratings waned after the inserts were shortened in 1999. The inserts were eventually discontinued at KOBR and KOBF effective March 1, 2007.

== Technical information ==
=== Subchannels ===
The station's signal is multiplexed:

Subchannels of KOBR
Subchannel	Res.	Short name	Programming
8.1	1080i	KOBR-DT	NBC
8.2	480i	KOBRDT2	Heroes & Icons
8.3	480i	KOBRDT3	MeTV
8.4	480i	KOBRDT4	Catchy Comedy
8.5	480i	KOBRDT5	Ion Plus
8.6	480i	KOBRDT6	Ion Television
8.7	480i	KOBRDT7	Start TV

=== Analog-to-digital conversion ===
KOBR ended regular programming on its analog signal, over VHF channel 8, on June 12, 2009, the official date on which full-power television stations in the United States transitioned from analog to digital broadcasts under federal mandate. The station's digital signal relocated from its pre-transition UHF channel 38 to VHF channel 8.

=== Translators ===
- K31GJ-D Alamogordo
- K33NX-D Carlsbad
- K30GM-D Capitan–Ruidoso
- K16EX-D Clovis
