= KOBR-TV Tower =

Aerial mast in New Mexico, US

Coordinates: 33°22′31.3″N 103°46′14.3″W

KOBR-TV Tower (also called KSWS-TV Tower) is a 490.7 metres (1,610 ft) high guy-wired aerial mast supporting the transmission antenna of television station KOBR in Caprock, New Mexico, United States. KOBR-TV Tower was built during 1960. The original KSWS-TV Tower was built during December 1956 and was the same height at 1,610 feet (490 m). It was the world's tallest structure, surpassing previous record-holder KWTV's tower until the completion of WGME-TV Tower in Maine during 1959 September. During 1960, the original tower reportedly fell in a gale or ice storm.

== See also ==
- List of masts

Records
| Preceded by KWTV Mast | World's tallest structure 1,610 feet (490 m); 1956–1959 | Succeeded by WGME TV Tower |
