= Iola Johnson =

American news anchor

Iola Vivian Johnson (born October 10, 1950) is an American television anchor, reporter, journalist. She was the first African-American news anchor for a Dallas television station and believed to be the first in the country.

== Career ==
Johnson was born in Texarkana, Arkansas. Her first professional position was with NBC affiliate KVOA in Tucson, Arizona, where she was a reporter, wrote for the 10 o'clock news, had a morning interview program and anchored weekends.

In 1973, she was hired at WFAA in Dallas and debuted as a weekend news anchor in May of that year. In 1975, she was teamed with a fellow reporter named Tracy Rowlett and together they began a ten-year run as co-anchors of the 6 and 10 pm weeknight newscasts. Within the first year, the new anchor team catapulted to number one in the ratings. It was the most successful news team in Dallas-Fort Worth television history. Johnson remained at WFAA-TV for more than 12 years.

In 1985, Johnson left her anchor position with WFAA-TV to start her own business. (Her last night on WFAA-TV being March 2, 1985.) Iola's second anchor stint was with KTVI in St. Louis. Her co-anchor was Kevin Cokely. After working for a short time in St. Louis, she returned to Dallas to work as the managing editor and news reporter for a morning show on KKDA AM radio.

In September 2000, Johnson chose to return to television news to help launch a new hour-long newscast at 4 pm on KTVT CBS 11 in Dallas-Fort Worth with longtime friend and former WFAA colleague Tracy Rowlett. After two years, Tracy and Iola left the 4pm newscast when itJohnson is the former host of Positively Texas (a weekly public affairs television show that aired on CBS 11 and TXA 21 KTXA, CBS 11's sister station and former UPN affiliate). was cancelled.

In 2012, television came calling again and she was hired as a television contributor for The Texas Daily news program on KTXD-TV, channel 41, an independent station in the Dallas/Ft. Worth area. There, she was teamed with former WFAA anchors Jeff Brady, Tracy Rowlett, John Criswell, Midge Hill, Debbie Denmon, and Troy Dungan.
