= Jody Dean =

American journalist and author (born 1959)

Jody Dean (born 1959) is an American journalist and author and a 2006 inductee of the Texas Radio Hall of Fame. During his career, Dean has worked with, interviewed, or performed with thousands of public figures, actors, musicians, authors, artists, and comics. Most recently, he hosted a weekly half-hour TV program for CBS-11 entitled "More Death with Jody Dean".

== Early life and education ==
Born in Fort Worth, Texas, Dean's career in broadcasting began in junior high school on WBAP-TV's Museum of Horrors. After graduating from Ft. Worth's Paschal High School, he took a shift at Abilene Christian University's campus radio station. Dean eventually left college for his first job, at KPAR in Granbury, Texas. A few months later he was hired at 1360 KXOL and has worked in Dallas-Ft. Worth ever since.

== Career ==
=== 1980-1987 ===
In 1981, Dean moved to 1190 KLIF. In 1982, he took on a three-hour Tuesday overnight shift at Dallas' KVIL. Dean was eventually promoted to evenings, but his ratings were disastrous. In 1987, he was taken off the air and moved to a behind-the-scenes job as morning show producer, a move that resulted in seven years of tutelage by Ron Chapman.

=== 1991-1999 ===
In 1991, Dean became executive producer for the Dallas Cowboys Radio Network. In 1994, he moved to KRLD to host a mid-day talk show. Again, his ratings as a solo host were disappointing, and he was reassigned as co-anchor of the KRLD Morning News in 1999. That led to a collaboration with co-anchor Jack Hines that lasted for another six years and included coverage of events such as the Oklahoma City bombing, the Fort Worth Tornado, and 9/11.

In 1995, Dean was named co-host of KTVT's Positively Texas! – an afternoon talk and variety show. After initial success, the show began languishing in the ratings, and Dean was approached about possibly switching to news. He began hosting the noon and 5 p.m. news with Rene Syler on CBS 11 – followed by co-hosting duties with Maria Arita on CBS 11 News at 4.

=== 2002-present ===
By 2005, Ron Chapman was at KLUV and seeking a successor. He turned to Dean, who became KLUV Morning Show host upon Chapman's retirement that year. For a period of time, Jody Dean and the Morning Team was also televised each weekday morning from 7 until 9 on KTXA-TV. Until January 2013, the KLUV Morning Show was co-hosted by news reporter Kathy Jones, traffic reporter Jonathan Hayes, Rebekah Black, and producer Bernie "Mac" Moreland.

Dean was the original deejay, emcee, and rodeo announcer at Billy Bob's Texas. In 2009, he became the original public address announcer for Dallas Cowboys home games at Cowboys Stadium. He was public address announcer for the Cotton Bowl in 2010. Dean was followed as the Cowboys stadium announcer by his friend and former KRLD colleague Roger Emrich.

In August 2018, the owners of 98.7 KLUV declined to renew Dean's contract. Radio veteran Jeff Miles was hired as his replacement, which Dean himself announced on the air. Both Miles and Black were also released by the station four years later. Dean's last show with KLUV was September 28, 2018. Dean ended his years at KLUV as the longest-serving and consistently highest-rated morning show host in station history. Within 5 years the station had dropped the "KLUV" call letters and rebranded itself under a different format. Dean resigned his membership in the Texas Radio Hall of Fame in August 2025, citing "personal reasons".

== Personal life ==
Married four times, Dean has three children. An adoptee, Dean reunited with his birth-family in 2002 and maintains a close relationship with them. Raised in the Church of Christ, Dean is a published author (Finding God in the Evening News) and a frequent motivational and inspirational speaker. A Christian, Dean said that he had a spiritual reawakening in 2002, but that he struggles with personal choices.

== Books ==
- Jody Dean, (2004), Finding God in the Evening News: A Broadcast Journalist Looks Beyond The Headlines, Renell, ISBN 0-8007-5972-9
