= KTVT =

Television station in Fort Worth, Texas

- Fort Worth–Dallas, Texas; United States
- City: Fort Worth, Texas
- Channels: Digital: 19 (UHF); Virtual: 11
- Branding: CBS Texas; CBS News Texas

Programming
- Affiliations: 11.1: CBS; for others, see § Subchannels

Ownership
- Owner: CBS Television Stations; (CBS Stations Group of Texas LLC)
- Sister stations: KTXA

History
- First air date: September 11, 1955
- Former call signs: KFJZ-TV (1955–1960)
- Former channel numbers: Analog: 11 (VHF, 1955–2009); Digital: 19 (UHF, 1998–2009), 11 (VHF, 2009–2012)
- Former affiliations: Independent (1955–1995)
- Call sign meaning: "Television for Texans"

Technical information
- Licensing authority: FCC
- Facility ID: 23422
- ERP: 1,000 kW
- HAAT: 533.9 m (1,752 ft)
- Transmitter coordinates: 32°32′36″N 96°57′33″W

Links
- Public license information: Public file; LMS
- Website: www.cbsnews.com/texas/

KTVT (channel 11), branded as CBS Texas, is a television station licensed to Fort Worth, Texas, United States, serving the Dallas–Fort Worth metroplex. It is owned by the CBS television network through its CBS Television Stations division alongside independent outlet KTXA (channel 21). The two stations share primary studio facilities on Bridge Street east of downtown Fort Worth; KTVT operates a secondary studio and newsroom—which also houses advertising sales offices for the stations, as well as the Dallas bureau for CBS News—at the CBS Tower on North Central Expressway in Dallas. KTVT's transmitter is located in Cedar Hill, Texas.

== History ==
=== 1955–1971: As an independent station ===
The allocation originally assigned to VHF channel 10 was contested between three groups that competed for approval by the Federal Communications Commission (FCC) to be the holder of the construction permit to build and license to operate a new television station on the second commercial VHF allocation to be assigned to Fort Worth, Texas. Lechner Television Co.—owned by oil and gas exploration and production entrepreneur Walter W. Lechner—filed the initial permit application on July 3, 1952. One week later on July 11, the Texas State Network—a broadcasting consortium owned by Sid W. Richardson (philanthropist and owner of, among other petroleum firms in the state, Fort Worth–based Sid W. Richardson Inc. and Richardson and Bass Oil Producers), media executive Gene L. Cagle, mineral rights firm owner R. K. Hanger, company president Charles B. Jordan and D. C. Homburg—filed a separate license application. The Fort Worth Television Co.—a group led by several oilmen including Raymond O. Shaffer (president and chairman of Fort Worth–based Welex Jet and part-owner of the Texas Rail Joint Co. and oil well drilling firm Monarch Manufacturing Co.), Sterling C. Holloway (a Fort Worth attorney and president/director of Continental Life Insurance Co.); M. J. Neeley (president and majority stockholder of Fort Worth–based trailer manufacturing firm Hobbs Manufacturing Co.), Arch Rowan (chairman of Fort Worth oil well drilling firm Rowan Drilling Co., and president and minority owner of local oil production firm Rowan Oil Co.) and F. Kirk Johnson (oil and gas lease purchaser and royalty collector), along with O. P. Newberry (vice president of Fort Worth National Bank)—became the third applicant for the license on December 11, 1952.

On September 3, 1953, in an approval of proposals submitted by John F. Easley (founding owner of KVSO-TV in Ardmore, Oklahoma) and Eastern TV Corp. (founding owner of KTEN in Ada, Oklahoma) to realign the two VHF channel assignments to alleviate interference issues with their proposed stations, the FCC amended its "Sixth Report and Order" assignment table to reassign channel 10 to Waco (later occupied by KWTX-TV) and move the VHF channel 11 allocation to Fort Worth. All three applicants subsequently amended their license applications to seek assignment on channel 11 instead. The FCC granted the permit to the Texas State Network on September 17, 1954, after the agency formally dismissed the applications by Lechner and the Fort Worth Television Co. The Sid Richardson-led group chose to request KFJZ-TV as the callsign for its television station, reflecting its existing ownership of KFJZ (1270 AM).

KFJZ-TV, first signed on the air at 2:30 p.m. on September 11, 1955, after a launch ceremony culminating in Fort Worth oilman Sid Richardson flipping the ceremonial switch to activate the transmitter. It was the first independent station to sign on in Texas, the fourth television station to sign on in the Dallas–Fort Worth Metroplex (after WBAP-TV (channel 5, now KXAS-TV), which signed on the air in 1948; KBTV (channel 8, now WFAA), which debuted in September 1949; and KRLD-TV (channel 4, now KDFW), which debuted in December 1949), and the first to debut in the market since the FCC's 1952 lifting of a four-year freeze on new applications for television station licenses. Originally, channel 11 maintained a 9 1/2-hour per day programming schedule, starting with its sign-on at 2:30 p.m. and concluding at its midnight sign-off. The station originally operated from facilities at 4801 West Freeway (in the present-day location of Interstate 30) in Fort Worth.

In 1964, KFJZ-TV moved its transmitter facilities to a tower at the antenna farm in Cedar Hill, which provided a signal that covered the Dallas–Fort Worth market. The transmitter relocation played a major factor in throwing channel 11 into a three-station competition for the NBC affiliation. The network had been affiliated with WBAP-TV since it signed on nine years earlier; however, the heirs of Fort Worth Star-Telegram founder Amon G. Carter chose to continue his legacy of civic boosterism of Fort Worth by refusing to move WBAP's transmitter facilities from eastern Fort Worth to an area between both cities. The lack of adequate reception throughout the entire Dallas–Fort Worth metropolitan area led NBC to simultaneously maintain an affiliation with WFAA beginning in 1950 to act as its Dallas affiliate. (Despite their close proximity, Arbitron originally designated Dallas and Fort Worth as separate markets: the Dallas market as Dallas County and surrounding counties in the area's eastern half and the Fort Worth market as neighboring Tarrant County and the counties surrounding it in the west. The two cities would be consolidated into a single television market in 1952.) WBAP-TV received a permit for Cedar Hill on March 24, 1964, and were on the air under Program Test Authority in November 1964.

The split-station arrangement frustrated NBC to the point where in early 1957, it threatened to terminate its affiliation contract with WBAP-TV if it did not agree to move its transmitter eastward to provide a signal that covered Dallas and Fort Worth. WFAA's corporate parent A.H. Belo first approached the network with an offer to become the Metroplex's exclusive NBC affiliate. The Roosevelts also submitted an offer to move the network's programming to KFJZ-TV. Neither station won out, as the Carter heirs would reluctantly agree to NBC's demands to retain the affiliation and move the WBAP-TV transmitter to an existing 1,500-foot (457 m) candelabra tower shared by WFAA and KRLD-TV, operating it at a higher effective radiated power strong enough to adequately cover central and eastern Dallas County and adjacent areas that had only rimshot signal coverage of the station. WBAP-TV became the exclusive NBC affiliate for the entire Dallas–Fort Worth market on September 1, 1957, with WFAA remaining an ABC affiliate; channel 11, meanwhile, continued as an independent station, filling its schedule with syndicated and locally produced programs. During the late 1950s, KFJZ-TV briefly maintained an affiliation with the NTA Film Network.

In 1959, Mr. Richardson, through Texas State Network gave KFJZ-TV and KFJZ (AM) an FM radio sister, when it signed on KFJZ-FM 97.1. In May 1960, the Texas State Network sold channel 11 to the NAFI Telecasting Corporation (which was also the parent company of Chris-Craft Industries at the time) for $4 million; the KFJZ radio stations were not included in the transaction, which was completed on August 1 of that year. Subsequently, the station's call letters were changed to KTVT (the last three letters meaning "Television for Texans") on September 1; the change was made due to an FCC rule in effect at the time that prohibited separately owned broadcast stations in the same market from sharing the same base call letters.

On February 23, 1962, NAFI Telecasting sold KTVT for $4 million to the WKY Television System subsidiary of the Oklahoma Publishing Company (OPUBCO), then owned by the family of Daily Oklahoman founder Edward K. Gaylord, who originally named the unit after its flagship stations—WKY and WKY-TV—in the company's headquarters of Oklahoma City. The transaction made KTVT the largest television station by market size to be owned by the media company, which OPUBCO would later rename Gaylord Broadcasting. Under the stewardship of Gaylord and James R. Terrell, whom the company appointed as the station's vice president and general manager, channel 11 became the leading independent station in the Southwestern United States; at the time, it carried a broad range of cartoons, off-network sitcoms, Westerns and drama series, movies and public affairs programming.

In July 1966, KTVT began broadcasting its programming in color, after the station acquired camera, projection and slide equipment to broadcast local and acquired programming in the format; KTVT inaugurated its color telecasts with the station's broadcast of the Miss Texas Pageant, its first local program to be produced in the format.

Like Gaylord's other independent stations, KTVT's programming was mainly aimed at rural and suburban residents in the Metroplex's outer portions. Channel 11 was further aided in its status as it was a VHF station, whereas its future competitors would transmit on the UHF band. KTVT gained its first major competitor in February 1968, when Doubleday Broadcasting signed on KMEC-TV (channel 39), which featured a broad mix of general entertainment and sports programs. The Christian Broadcasting Network (CBN) entered into the mix in January 1973, when it launched KXTX-TV (channel 33), with a schedule that featured a mix of family-oriented secular programs and religious programs. However, the former of the two would struggle, leading Doubleday to donate the UHF channel 39 license (by then, assigned the KDTV call letters) to CBN in exchange for acquiring KXTX's license for UHF channel 33; while KXTX continued to grow after the call sign and intellectual unit were transferred to channel 39 in November 1973, KDTV could not compete with either KXTX nor KTVT and shut down nine weeks later.

=== 1971–1993: Expansion into a regional superstation ===
KTVT's popularity also spread outside of the Metroplex beginning in the late 1970s, when the station began making its signal available to cable television providers throughout Texas and in surrounding states. This attained it a new status as a superstation along the lines of WTBS in Atlanta, WGN-TV in Chicago and WOR-TV in New York City; its signal was transmitted to about 400 cable systems and to C-band satellite subscribers across the country, mainly in the Southwestern U.S. At its height, KTVT was available on nearly every cable provider in Texas and Oklahoma, as well as large swaths of Louisiana, Arkansas and New Mexico.

KTVT remained the Dallas–Fort Worth market's leading independent station into the 1980s, even as it gained three additional UHF independent competitors launched over the course of six months in the early 1980s. National Business Network Inc. returned channel 33 to the air as KNBN-TV on September 29, 1980; however, that station did not begin to make any real headway against KTVT in the ratings during its tenure under local ownership. KTVT gained a fourth independent competitor six days later on October 6, when Grant Broadcasting signed on KTXA (channel 21). A fifth competitor arrived on January 26, 1981, when Liberty Television signed on KTWS-TV (channel 27, now KDFI). KTVT and KXTX—the latter of which had also expanded into a regional superstation around this time—went head to head to achieve status as the strongest independent station in North Texas, with its three younger competitors lagging behind, and were the only independents in the market that were able to turn a profit.

On July 1, 1984, Tulsa, Oklahoma–based United Video Satellite Group—which already distributed WGN-TV in Chicago and planned to uplink its New York City sister station WPIX via satellite as national superstations—uplinked the KTVT signal to the Satcom IV satellite (later relocated to the Spacenet III in December 1988) for distribution to cable and satellite subscribers throughout the Southwestern United States, in a move by Gaylord to persuade the providers that imported the station's signal by microwave relay to begin transmitting KTVT by satellite. For about six years afterward, the KTVT satellite signal carried the same programming schedule as that seen in the Metroplex. In addition to being available via cable, this signal was also distributed directly to satellite dish owners. Around that time, KTVT further cemented this status by referencing the station in continuity as "Channel 11, The Super Ones".

KTVT was one of the few long-tenured major market independents that did not align with the fledgling Fox Broadcasting Company in the run-up to the network's launch in October 1986. This was because network parent News Corporation had purchased KRLD-TV (the former KNBN-TV, which would become KDAF) as part of its merger with Metromedia in May 1985, six months prior to the Rupert Murdoch-owned media company's announcement of the formation of the Fox network. KDAF and the other five former Metromedia stations served as the nuclei for the new network as the original members of the Fox Television Stations, its group of owned-and-operated stations. However, even without the presence of KDAF, KTVT would have likely passed on the Fox affiliation in any event. Most of the smaller markets that were within KTVT's vast cable footprint—with the minor exceptions of areas such as the adjacent Ada–Sherman and, until KLMG-TV switched to the network in 1991, Tyler–Longview–Nacogdoches markets—had enough commercial television stations to allow Fox to maintain an exclusive affiliation, meaning that it would have made little sense to have KTVT as a multi-market Fox affiliate. In late 1985, the station relocated its operations to its current facility at 5233 Bridge Street, as a construction project that would widen the West Freeway into a four-lane highway forced KTVT to move from its original studios, which were torn down to make way for the additional freeway lanes.

As KTVT gained regional exposure, the station became vulnerable in the Dallas–Fort Worth area and underestimated the ability of UHF competitor KTXA to acquire top-rated syndicated programs. Out of the companies that owned the market's independents, Grant Broadcasting was particularly aggressive in its programming acquisitions by leveraging its independent stations elsewhere around the country for the strongest programs that were entering into syndication; as a result, Grant-owned KTXA edged ahead of KTVT in the ratings by the fall of 1984. Not to stay outdone, after Gaylord appointed Charles L. Edwards–who had been general manager of KSTW in Tacoma, Washington–as KTVT's executive vice president and general manager (as well as the group's corporate programming director) in 1984, the station began making its own moves in acquiring stronger first-run and off-network syndicated programming, gaining the rights to series such as The Cosby Show, Night Court and Cheers. The station's ratings improved under the stewardship of Edwards, resulting in KTVT retaking its status as the top-rated independent station in the market by the time of his retirement in 1989.

On May 19, 1988, the FCC passed the Syndication Exclusivity Rights Rule (SyndEx), a policy that required cable television providers to black out syndicated programs aired on any out-of-market stations carried on their systems (either stations from nearby markets serving as default network affiliates or superstations), if a television station has obtained the exclusive rights to air a particular program in a given market. Gaylord was not willing to create a dedicated feed that included substitute programs that would replace shows aired on KTVT locally in certain time slots that could not air outside of its primary viewing area due to market exclusivity claims by various stations (as WGN-TV and WWOR-TV did at the time the rule became official); as such, when the rule went into effect on January 1, 1990, cable providers in some areas throughout the South Central U.S. chose to drop KTVT from their lineups.

In December 1993, Gaylord engaged in discussions with Time Warner on a potential agreement to affiliate KTVT and sister independent stations KHTV in Houston, WVTV in Milwaukee and KSTW in the Seattle–Tacoma area into charter affiliates of The WB, a network announced one month earlier on November 2 and founded as a venture between Time Warner's Warner Bros. Television unit and the Tribune Company, which was one of two television networks originally proposed to launch in the fall of 1994—along with the United Paramount Network (UPN)—created to target the younger-skewing audiences courted by Fox and, to a lesser extent, to compete with ABC, NBC and CBS. (The network's launch would later be pushed back to January 1995.) Gaylord had not yet signed the proposed agreement when another planned affiliation transaction took place that resulted in the shift of two existing networks from their longtime station partners. (Note: Steve Spann, Gaylord Counsel at the time the Gaylord-CBS offer, agreement and lawsuits with The WB took place.)

=== 1994–1998: As a CBS affiliate ===
On May 23, 1994, as part of a broad deal that also saw News Corporation acquire a 20% equity interest in the company, New World Communications signed a long-term agreement to affiliate its nine CBS-, ABC- or NBC-affiliated television stations with Fox, which sought to strengthen its affiliate portfolio after the National Football League (NFL) accepted the network's $1.58 billion bid for the television rights to the National Football Conference (NFC)—a four-year contract that began with the 1994 NFL season—on December 18, 1993. At the time, Fox's owned-and-operated and affiliate stations were mostly UHF outlets that had limited to no prior history as major network affiliates, among them its existing Dallas outlet KDAF. One of the stations involved in the agreement was Dallas–Fort Worth's KDFW-TV, which had been affiliated with CBS since it signed on in December 1949. New World had included KDFW into the Fox agreement along with three of its sister stations — KTBC-TV in Austin and KTVI in St. Louis — as a byproduct of the $717-million acquisition of the four Argyle Television Holdings-owned stations announced by New World on May 26.

CBS had enough time to find another Metroplex-area station with which it could reach an agreement, as, at the time of the New World-Fox agreement, its affiliation contract with KDFW would not expire until July 1, 1995. CBS first approached KXAS-TV; however, its then-owner LIN Broadcasting subsequently signed a long-term affiliation deal renewing its contract with KXAS and its other NBC affiliates. WFAA was eliminated as an option as its owner during that time, Belo, would reach a new long-term agreement with ABC for its Dallas flagship station and other ABC-affiliated stations that the group owned. This left KTVT, an independent station, as CBS's only viable option in the Dallas–Fort Worth market for landing a VHF affiliate; it approached Gaylord with an offer to affiliate with KTVT, in exchange for also switching KSTW to the network to replace KIRO-TV as its Seattle-area affiliate. However, as Time Warner asserted that its Dallas, Houston and Seattle stations were legally bound to draft affiliation proposals for The WB, on July 22, 1994, Gaylord—which had not signed a formal agreement—asked a judge with the U.S. District Court for the Northern District of Texas to confirm that those stations were not "legally obligated to 'affiliate'" with The WB. Not pleased with Gaylord's about-face, on August 18, Time Warner filed a lawsuit seeking to block the Gaylord-CBS affiliation deal and enforce the alleged WB affiliation contract, alleging breach of contract and bad faith.

Despite the dispute, on September 14, CBS and Gaylord signed a ten-year agreement with CBS to transfer the network's Metroplex affiliation to KTVT and its Seattle affiliation to KSTW (as a result of this deal, KIRO-TV—which would later rejoin CBS in June 1997—subsequently joined the nascent UPN in March 1995). The WB later reached an agreement with KDAF, which Fox Television Stations had announced it would sell in order to affiliate KDFW with the Fox network; KXTX-TV, in the meantime, agreed to serve as The WB's Metroplex charter affiliate in a temporary arrangement until the sale of KDAF to Renaissance Broadcasting and Fox's subsequent move to KDFW was finalized. As a consequence of its conversion into a "Big Three" affiliate, Gaylord and United Video agreed to cease distributing KTVT as a regional superstation and gradually terminated KTVT's carriage agreements with cable systems located outside of the Dallas–Fort Worth market and with satellite providers by the end of 1994. Most of the markets located within KTVT's large cable footprint—with the exception of some smaller markets that had to rely on an out-of-market affiliate to receive the network's programming—already had CBS-affiliated stations, which would have resulted in CBS programming being subject to blackout restrictions under the FCC's network non-duplication rules.

At the time it signed the contract with CBS, KTVT began airing The Price Is Right and The Bold and the Beautiful within its daytime schedule, after KDFW chose to preempt them in favor of Donahue and the short-lived syndicated court show Juvenile Justice, respectively, in the respective slots of the two CBS Daytime programs as part of its transition to Fox; channel 11 also cleared select CBS prime time programs that KDFW-TV preempted in order to run locally produced specials. On the evening of July 1, 1995, at the end of their late-night newscast, anchors Jerry Jenkins and Beth McKay told viewers that KTVT would officially become a CBS affiliate, and at 10 p.m., during a break within the station's telecast of a Major League Baseball game between the Texas Rangers and the Seattle Mariners, Ed Trimble—KTVT's vice president and general manager at the time—delivered an on-air message informing viewers of the forthcoming network changes (David Whitaker, then the vice president and general manager at KDFW, also conducted a segment on the network switch that aired concurrently on channel 4; KTVT had aired a half-hour special detailing network affiliation changes involving channel 11, KDFW and KDAF, Are You Ready for This?, preceding the game earlier that evening, among multiple other airings of the special during the weeks of June 25 and July 2).

KTVT officially became a CBS affiliate on July 2, 1995, when the remainder of the network's programming lineup moved to the station; the first CBS network program to air on the station as a full-time affiliate was CBS News Sunday Morning at 8 a.m. Central Time that morning. The station also adopted "The Eye of Texas" as its slogan, in reference to both its CBS affiliation and the network's signature Eyemark logo, as well as a red and yellow boxed logo with a vertically parallelogrammed "11" inspired by the design used by eventual sister station KCBS-TV in Los Angeles at the time (adopted by that station in February 1994), which was also used by KSTW upon that station joining CBS. (During its first years as a CBS affiliate, station IDs identified the station as serving "Dallas/Ft. Worth", out of accordance with FCC regulations that required television stations to list the station's city of license—in KTVT's case, Fort Worth—first, followed by any other cities the station may serve; traditionally and since, in compliance with these rules, KTVT has listed Fort Worth, with or without abbreviating "Fort" as "Ft.", first among its cities of service in its station identifications.) As KDFW-TV took over the Fox affiliation on July 2, KDAF—whose sale to Renaissance Broadcasting was finalized the following day on July 3—formally assumed the WB affiliation from KXTX-TV, which concurrently reverted into an independent station.

Even though it was now a "Big Three" affiliate, during its first year with CBS, KTVT's lineup of syndicated shows that aired outside of local newscasts and network programs—consisting mainly of off-network sitcoms held over from its existence as an independent (such as The Cosby Show, Full House, Matlock and Roseanne) and first-run newsmagazines (such as Extra and the short-lived Day & Date)—more closely resembled an inventory normally offered by an independent or minor network-affiliated station. Much of the syndicated sitcoms, drama series and cartoons that KTVT was forced to divest because of CBS' network-dominated programming schedule were acquired by KDAF and KTXA (which had become a UPN affiliate when that network launched in January 1995).

CBS Tower in north Dallas, which houses the Dallas bureau and certain business offices for KTVT/KTXA.

Gradually throughout the late 1990s, the station began taking on the look and format of a major network affiliate, expanding its local news programming and replacing the sitcoms that initially occupied its weekday schedule with more first-run syndicated newsmagazines and game shows. For much of the next decade, KTVT's sign-on to sign-off viewership averaged in fourth place, even as CBS rebounded in the ratings nationally after the network acquired the rights to the NFL's American Football Conference (AFC) from NBC in 1998; though the station would grow into a reasonably stronger position as a CBS affiliate compared to KSTW, which terminated its agreement with CBS in March 1997. (Cox Enterprises bought KSTW two months earlier, only to trade it to the Paramount Stations Group in exchange for KIRO, resulting in KSTW becoming a UPN owned-and-operated station and KIRO rejoining CBS, to resolve an ownership conflict with rival KING-TV that was created by Belo's purchase of The Providence Journal Company.)

At the time of the network switch, Gaylord had already begun winding down its television interests, selling its network affiliates, independent stations and cable networks to other groups.

=== 1999–present: As a CBS O&O station ===
On April 12, 1999, Gaylord announced its formal exit from television when the company agreed to sell KTVT—the company's lone remaining broadcast television property—to CBS Corporation for $485 million; the sale received FCC approval on August 3, 1999. The purchase placed KTVT under common ownership with Infinity Broadcasting Corporation's six Metroplex radio properties, KRLD (1080 AM), KLUV (98.7 FM, now KSPF), KRBV (100.3 FM, now KJKK), KVIL (103.7 FM), KYNG (105.3 FM, now KRLD-FM) and KOAI (107.5 FM, now KMVK). Also in 1999, KTVT relocated its primary operations from its Stemmons Freeway facility into an existing office facility on North Central Expressway (near the Walnut Hill neighborhood) that had remained under Gaylord ownership. The move was speculated to have been coordinated between Gaylord and CBS to consolidate CBS's radio operations with KTVT to reduce overhead costs.

On September 7, 1999, Viacom announced its intent to merge with CBS Corporation for $35.6 billion; the purchase was finalized on April 26, 2000, officially placing KTVT into a duopoly with then-UPN station KTXA as a result of the integration of CBS's group of owned-and-operated stations into Viacom's Paramount Stations Group subsidiary. (That transaction also effectively reunited KTVT with KSTW under common ownership.) Subsequently, KTXA relocated from its existing facilities at the Paramount Building in downtown Dallas and integrated its business operations with KTVT at its Bridge Street facility in Fort Worth. On January 3, 2006, the original Viacom split into two companies, with the original Viacom being restructured as CBS Corporation and a new company that assumed the Viacom name; KTVT/KTXA and the remainder of the Viacom Television Stations unit (renamed CBS Television Stations), Showtime Networks and Infinity Broadcasting (renamed CBS Radio) were spun off into CBS Corporation.

On August 26, 2013, KTVT/KTXA moved its Dallas business operations to a redeveloped office building at 12001 North Central Expressway (twenty blocks north of the previous Dallas facility at 10111 North Central, near Texas Health Presbyterian Hospital, between Walnut Hill and Meadow Road). The office tower that the stations began occupying—where KTVT's Dallas newsroom and the advertising sales offices for the duopoly occupy the top floor—was renamed CBS Tower. The station's primary studio facilities, and other technical and business operations remain at the Bridge Street facility in east Fort Worth; the former 24,000 square feet (2,230 m^{2}) Dallas offices on North Central were purchased by Avial Hotels (the real estate development subsidiary of North Carolina–based Blue Star Hospitality) in November 2015, which intended to redevelop the building as a hotel.

On August 13, 2019, National Amusements announced that Viacom and CBS Corporation would recombine their assets into a singular entity to be named ViacomCBS in a deal valued at up to $15.4 billion. The acquisition was finalized on December 4, 2019. On February 16, 2022, ViacomCBS changed its name to Paramount Global.

On February 22, 2023, KTVT changed its main on-air brand to CBS Texas, and its newscast and sportscast titles to CBS News Texas and CBS Sports Texas respectively, while retaining the pre-existing "star 11" logo as a secondary icon. Station representatives explained the change as being more representative of KTVT's wide coverage area and some statewide initiatives, and research indicating that area residents consider themselves "Texans first". However, the change does not affect the status of CBS affiliates in other parts of the state.

== KTVT-DT2 ==
On May 25, 2015, KTVT launched a digital subchannel on virtual channel 11.2 to serve as a charter affiliate of Decades, a classic television network co-owned by CBS Television Stations and Weigel Broadcasting (the latter of which holds responsibility of affiliate distribution to stations not owned by CBS) that features programs from the CBS Television Distribution (now CBS Media Ventures) library, including archival footage from CBS News. The network launched on that date with most of the CBS-owned television stations as well as Weigel-owned CBS affiliate WDJT-TV in Milwaukee among its charter outlets. On September 3, 2018, KTVT replaced Decades with Start TV.

== Programming ==
KTVT is one of the few CBS stations in the Central Time Zone (alongside those such as sister stations WBBM-TV in Chicago and KCBS-TV in Los Angeles, with other affiliates such as WTVF in Nashville and KOLR in Springfield, Missouri) that airs The Young and the Restless at 11:30 a.m., having aired it on a half-hour delay since the cancellation of its noon newscast in early January 2004 (most CBS affiliates prefer to air the soap opera at 11 a.m. as a lead-in to their midday newscasts).

Like many of its CBS-owned sister stations, prior to September 2022, it aired Let's Make a Deal at 9 a.m. weekdays, instead of the 2 p.m. time slot where the program is carried nationally (this scheduling, which originated when Guiding Light occupied the final hour of CBS' daytime lineup prior to that program's discontinuance in September 2009, is more common among the network's owned-and-operated stations as well as select affiliates in the Eastern Time Zone, where Let's Make a Deal would normally air in the 3 p.m. time slot). In September 2022, KTVT launched a 9 a.m. newscast, followed by The Drew Barrymore Show (which began a new half hour format after running one hour for its first two seasons) and LMAD moved to 2 p.m. Since it joined the network, KTVT has also aired CBS' children's program blocks over both Saturdays and Sundays (currently, it airs a half-hour of the CBS Dream Team on Sunday mornings before CBS News Sunday Morning on weeks when the network is scheduled to air sports events on Saturday late mornings). On August 23, 2024, KTVT discontinued the 9 a.m. newscast and replaced it with specific programming.

=== Sports programming ===
==== Texas Rangers ====
In 1985, KTVT obtained the broadcast rights to the Texas Rangers under a ten-year agreement. The contract was included in Gaylord Broadcasting president Edward L. Gaylord's purchase of a 33% ownership stake in the Major League Baseball franchise from Eddie Chiles; the purchase initially failed to reach the two-thirds votes among American League team owners (it failed in a vote of 9–5) to reach a confirmation vote among all league owners on January 11 of that year. Many of the MLB team owners were concerned that Gaylord would utilize his interest in the Rangers to expand KTVT into a national superstation along the lines of WTBS (which carried the Atlanta Braves), WGN-TV (which aired the Chicago Cubs and White Sox) and WOR-TV (which held rights to the New York Mets). The sale and broadcast contract was approved by Major League Baseball Commissioner Peter Ueberroth in an invocation of a "best interests of baseball" clause on February 8 of that year, the terms of the contract required Gaylord/KTVT to pay retransmission fees for any games televised outside its six-state cable footprint. Gaylord was similarly stymied in his attempt to acquire Chiles's 58% interest in and majority control of the team, which instead went to a group led by eventual Texas Governor and U.S. President George W. Bush in conjunction with real estate developer H. Bert Mack and investor Frank L. Morsani in a $86-million deal struck in April 1989.

KTVT aired an average of 95 Rangers games per season over the first ten years of the contract, which consisted entirely of away games up through the 1989 season; a limited schedule of home games (which had only been available locally on cable through regional sports network Home Sports Entertainment) was added in 1990, selected on the basis of whether the games were projected to have high ticket sales and attendance. After the station agreed to affiliate with CBS, KTVT and then-independent station KXTX-TV entered into a programming arrangement for the 1995 season, in which the latter station would carry CBS programs pre-empted by KTVT on dates when Rangers game telecasts were scheduled to air, in addition to — due to network affiliation contracts that limit the number of programming preemptions on an annual basis — some Rangers broadcasts that were produced by and contracted to air on Channel 11. The team formally moved its local over-the-air game broadcasts to KXTX in the 1996 season.

==== Other sports ====
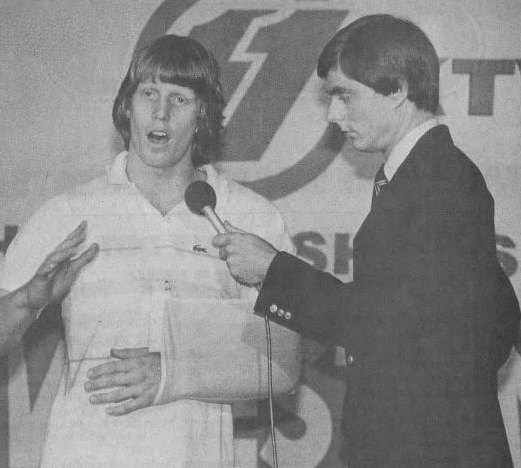
Mike Von Erich and Marc Lowrance on the interview set of Championship Sports in August 1985. The station's then-logo is visible behind the two men.

During the 1970s and 1980s, KTVT served the flagship station of the highly-popular local pro wrestling program Saturday Night Wrestling, and aired the two-hour wrestling program Championship Sports on Saturday nights. It has also broadcast college football and basketball events involving programs based around Texas; from 1984 until the conference folded after the 1995–96 season, the station aired football and men's basketball games from the now-defunct Southwestern Conference that were syndicated by Raycom Sports, including those involving the University of Texas Longhorns (it shared the broadcast rights to some of the game telecasts with KTXA).

KTVT formerly served as the television flagship for the Dallas Mavericks from 1982 to 1998; it initially shared the rights to the NBA team's game broadcasts with WFAA, with KTVT running about 30 Dallas Mavericks games per season. KTXA became the sharing partner in the team's local broadcasting contract after it assumed WFAA's end of the contract beginning with the 1986–87 season. After KTVT joined CBS in 1995, the station continued to air a significantly reduced schedule of Mavericks telecasts, at which time KTXA took over the primary over-the-air rights; KTXA would acquire the remaining telecast rights held by Channel 11 starting with the 1998–99 season. Following the relocation of the former Minnesota North Stars from Minneapolis that year, Channel 11 also held the local rights to televise National Hockey League (NHL) games featuring the Dallas Stars during the 1993–94 season (the team's first season in Dallas).

Since September 1998, KTVT has served as the official television partner of the Dallas Cowboys, holding rights to air various team-related programs during the regular season (including the Cowboys Postgame Show, Special Edition with Jerry Jones and the head coach's weekly analysis program, along with specials such as the Making of the Dallas Cowboys Cheerleaders Calendar and postseason team reviews) as well as preseason games that are not televised nationally on broadcast or cable television. Through CBS' contract with the National Football League (NFL), under which it holds primary broadcast rights to the American Football Conference, Cowboys game telecasts on KTVT during the regular season are limited to interconference games against AFC teams played at AT&T Stadium (including those held in odd-numbered years on Thanksgiving Day) and, since 2014, cross-flexed games originally scheduled to air on Fox against its fellow teams in the National Football Conference (NFC). Most other regular season games televised over-the-air locally air on KDFW, which has served as the Cowboys' primary local broadcaster since 1962 (with the exception of a one-season absence due to the transfer of NFC television rights to Fox in 1994, in the precursor to the affiliation switch), through Fox's rights to the NFC; KXAS-TV also carries certain regular season Cowboys games in which the team is a participant via NBC's rights to the Sunday Night Football package.

=== News operation ===
KTVT's "CBS News Texas" logo, used since 2023.

As of August 2024, KTVT presently broadcasts 28 hours, 55 minutes of locally produced newscasts each week (with 4 hours, 35 minutes each weekday; 3 1/2 hours on Saturdays; and 2 1/2 hours on Sundays). In addition, the station produces two sports programs that it airs on Sunday nights after the 10 p.m. newscast: the sports highlight show The Score and the football highlight program The Blitz: The Dallas Cowboys Report, which are both co-hosted by sports reporter and fill-in sports anchor Bill Jones (the latter program formerly produced a spin-off focusing on the Dallas Desperados, which was discontinued after the Arena Football League franchise folded in 2009). Currently, KTVT is the only big-four station in the market that does not produce a 6 p.m. newscast.

==== News department history ====
Channel 11 first established a news department as an independent station in 1960, when it debuted a half-hour local newscast at noon and a 15-minute newscast at 10 p.m.—the latter airing as an intermission within its late prime time movie presentations, which began at 9 p.m., and resumed until conclusion after the newscast—each weekday; the program featured anchors based in both Dallas and Fort Worth. In August 1960, the station premiered Reveille, a half-hour weekday morning newscast that was anchored by Bill Camfield (who also played Icky Twerp as host of the children's program Slam Bang Theater from September 1959 to March 1972 and as Gargon in his role as host of the horror film showcase Nightmare from 1963 to 1966, and later served as the station's program director until 1972); the program ran until 1963. In 1981, the station began producing 60-second live news updates under the title Headline News (not to be confused with the cable channel now known as HLN, which debuted the following year), that aired during commercial breaks within the station's daytime and evening programming.

Gaylord Broadcasting management eventually decided to make investments to expand the station's news operations. On August 20, 1990, KTVT began producing a long-form, hour-long prime time newscast at 7 p.m., airing only on Monday through Friday nights, which was designed to appeal to viewers whose work schedule and evening commute prevented them from watching local early evening newscasts on KDFW, KXAS and WFAA. Debuting under the umbrella title Newswatch 11, the newscasts were initially anchored by Mike Hambrick (whose brother, Judd, had previously served as anchor at KDFW from 1972 to 1973) and Midge Hill (who joined KTVT after a five-year stint as an anchor/reporter at WFAA), alongside chief meteorologist Bob Goosmann and sports director Bobby Estill. It was the first attempt in the Metroplex at a local newscast in the 7 p.m. timeslot since KRLD-TV/KDAF produced a one-hour news program at 7 p.m. from July 1984 until that station's initial news department was shut down by then-general manager Ray Schonbak in May 1986, following the completion of its purchase by News Corporation, after it struggled against prime time network programs on KDFW, KXAS and WFAA throughout that program's run.

The newscast was moved to 9 p.m. five months later on January 7, 1991, with then-general manager Ed Trimble citing frequent preemptions caused by KTVT's Texas Rangers and Dallas Mavericks game telecasts. (The move also allowed KTVT to accommodate earlier airings caused by Texas Rangers, Dallas Stars and Dallas Mavericks evening games that the station was scheduled to air between 7:30 and 9 p.m., rather than delaying it until after the game concluded.) The timeslot shift made it the first such newscast to be offered by a commercial television station in the Metroplex in the 9 p.m. time slot (predating rival KDFW's addition of its own late evening newscast in that hour when it switched from CBS to Fox in July 1995, and the formation of KDAF's news department with the debut of its own 9 p.m. newscast in 1999; PBS member station KERA-TV [channel 13] previously carried a newscast at 9 p.m. from 1970 to 1976).

The weeknight editions of the 9 p.m. newscast were expanded to one hour on February 1, 1993, at which time the late newscast was retitled The Nine O'Clock News (subtitled The Nine O'Clock News: Special Edition for editions aired in advance due to sports events). (The logo and imaging package introduced with the rebrand would be used by certain independent stations and minor network affiliates, such as KOCB [now an independent station] in Oklahoma City, during the mid-1990s.) By this time, Estill had left his position as sports director in 1992 and was replaced by Curt Menefee; Ken Malloy would take over as Hill's co-anchor following Hambrick's departure a few months after the program's title change. Hour-long Saturday and Sunday editions of the newscast were added on March 12, 1994, with co-anchors Beth McKay and Jerry Jenkins (who had been reporters at the station since the launch of the prime time newscast), meteorologist Brad Barton (a veteran news and weather anchor at KRLD radio since 1978, who continued his duties at that station after joining KTVT) and sports anchor Timm Matthews (who came from KXAS-TV and would later replace Menefee as sports director following his departure for Fox Sports) initially helming the weekend broadcasts. Matthews also hosted the half-hour sports highlight program, First Sports, which debuted the following day on March 13 as a lead-out for the abbreviated half-hour Sunday edition of the newscast. The Nine O'Clock News grew to become a strong ratings performer in the 9 p.m. timeslot, holding its own in the midst of competition from network drama series and newsmagazines that aired against it on the market's "Big Three" affiliates.

As CBS was seeking a station to replace KDFW as its Metroplex outlet, the fact that KTVT was the only English-language station in the Metroplex not affiliated with either of the "Big Three" networks that had a functioning news department played a major factor in the network's decision to approach Gaylord about negotiating a deal to move its programming to the station. Upon becoming a CBS affiliate on July 1, 1995, KTVT relaunched its news department under the 11 News brand (later re-titled CBS 11 News in January 2000, following the sale by Gaylord to CBS), and made extensive changes to its news schedule with the debut of an hour-long morning newscast at 6 a.m. and an early-evening newscast at 6 p.m. on Monday through Fridays. The existing late-evening newscast concurrently moved one hour later to 10 p.m., while the late edition of that newscast on Saturdays and Sundays was accompanied by early-evening newscasts on both days; until July 1999, the late newscast maintained the 11 on 11 format, which emphasized a nonstop rundown of the day's top local and national headlines and a "Forecast First" weather segment prior to the first commercial break in an 11-minute-long "A"-block, with an in-depth "11 News Extra" report and a sports segment filling the remaining segments of the newscast. (Seattle sister station KSTW also adopted the Eleven @ 11:00 format for its 11 p.m. newscast from March 1995 to June 1997, using the primarily numeric 11 at 11 as the title.)

In turn, the station also increased its on-air and behind-the-scenes news staff from 40 to 80 employees, hiring among others Cameron Harper (who replaced Malloy, who was moved to the daytime newscasts, as weeknight co-anchor); Hill, Goosmann, McKay (who would shift to weekend sports anchor in 1997), Jenkins and Matthews were among a handful of on-air staffers that stayed with the news department following the CBS switch (Hill was fired by the station in November 1996 and was replaced as weeknight co-anchor by Karen Borta, who remained in that role until February 2015, when Borta was moved to the weekday morning newscast; Goosmann remained chief meteorologist until he left KTVT in 2001). On that date, the station also adopted the on-air imaging that Seattle sister station KSTW implemented when that station joined CBS four months earlier on March 13, which, in addition to the aforementioned parallelogram "11" logo design, was accompanied by that station's graphics package, set design and newscast theme music.

During the station's first decade with CBS, newscasts were added and dropped from KTVT's schedule. Channel 11 would first expand news programming with the debut of half-hour weekday newscasts at noon and 5 p.m. in February 1996. In January 1999, it added a 6:30 p.m. newscast on weeknights as a replacement for Hard Copy (which had been airing on KTVT since September 1997, when the program moved to the station from KDFW); the newscast was later replaced in September 2000 by Hollywood Squares (which had previously aired on WFAA from the revival series' September 1998 premiere until June 2000). Concurrent with the discontinuance of Hard Copy following its cancellation, the station debuted an hour-long 4 p.m. newscast on September 11 of that year; after the program's initial cancellation in September 2002, KTVT restored that newscast in January 2004 (later reducing it to a half-hour broadcast in September 2005, before expanding it to an hour once more on January 11, 2010). The noon newscast returned in September 2005, but was subsequently canceled the following month after it moved Jeopardy! from its previous 4:30 p.m. timeslot to 11 a.m. (KTVT would eventually restore a midday news program, with the debut of a half-hour 11 a.m. newscast on August 12, 2013, which replaced Jeopardy! after the game show was moved to KTXA). In September 2006, due to budget cuts imposed by CBS Corporation, KTVT discontinued its morning newscasts on Saturdays and Sundays, making it the only "Big Four" network station in the Dallas-Fort Worth market that did not have a weekend morning newscast for the next eight years until KTVT launched hour-long weekend editions of CBS 11 News This Morning on both days on September 20, 2014.

For most of the time since it joined CBS, KTVT has been one of the network's weaker stations in terms of total day and local news viewership. However, it has made gains in viewership in some time periods since the late 2000s, even beating overall first place stalwart WFAA in some time periods. During the February 2011 sweeps period, the station's 6 and 10 p.m. newscasts placed first among total viewers for the first time in the station's history. That May, KTVT had placed second overall in both total viewership and in the demographic of adults ages 25–54 by small margins for the first time in its history; this is in comparison to the May sweeps period of the previous year, in which Channel 11 won in both total viewers and 25- to 54-year-olds. The 5, 6 and 10 p.m. newscasts all saw ratings increases in both demographics placing second.

On September 24, 2007, KTVT became the third television station in the Dallas–Fort Worth market (after WFAA and KXAS) to begin broadcasting its local newscasts in high definition. In May 2010, KTVT became among the first CBS O&Os to adopt the group's new standardized graphics package (which was first implemented that February by sister stations WCBS-TV in New York City and KCBS-TV in Los Angeles), and accordingly began using the "New Generation" series of The CBS Enforcer Music Collection by Gari Media Group as the theme music for its newscasts.

Unused "CBS DFW" logo.

KTVT launched a streaming news service, CBSN Dallas–Ft. Worth (now CBS News Texas) on May 18, 2020, as part of a rollout of similar services (each a localized version of the national CBSN service) across the CBS-owned stations.

==== Notable current on-air staff ====
- Steve Pickett – general assignment reporter/anchor

==== Notable former on-air staff ====
- Jim Acosta – reporter (1998–2000)
- Andy Adler – sports reporter/anchor
- Julie Bologna – meteorologist (2004–2008)
- Bill Camfield – host of horror film showcases Slam Bang Theatre and Nightmare (1955–1972)
- Dale Cardwell – reporter
- Candice Crawford – reporter/co-host of Dallas Cowboys focused show The Blitz (2007–2009)
- Jody Dean – weekday afternoon anchor/Positively Texas! co-host (1995–1999)
- Tamron Hall – reporter (1995–1997)
- Iola Johnson – anchor/host of Positively Texas (2000–2008)
- Babe Laufenberg – sports director; weeknight sports anchor (1997–2015)
- Marc Lowrance – announcer for Saturday Night Wrestling (1983–1990)
- Boyd Matson
- Curt Menefee – sports anchor (1992–1995)
- Bill Mercer – announcer for Saturday Night Wrestling (1976–1985)
- Betty Nguyen – morning anchor
- Uma Pemmaraju – reporter
- Tracy Rowlett – anchor/reporter/managing editor (1999–2008)
- Suzanne Sena – entertainment reporter (2004–2006)
- Jane Slater – sports anchor/reporter
- Rene Syler – anchor/reporter (1997–2002)
- Fredricka Whitfield – reporter (1990–1991)

== Technical information ==
=== Subchannels ===
The station's signal is multiplexed:

Subchannels of KTVT
Subchannel	Res.	Short name	Programming
11.1	1080i	KTVT-DT	CBS
11.2	480i	StartTV	Start TV
11.3	480i	DABL	Dabl
11.4	480i	Outlaw	Outlaw
11.5	480i	Charge!	Charge!

=== Analog-to-digital conversion ===
KTVT began transmitting a digital television signal on UHF channel 19 on May 1, 1999; for its first year of operation, KTVT-DT transmitted only in standard definition. The station shut down its analog signal, over VHF channel 11, on June 12, 2009, as part of the federally mandated transition from analog to digital television. The station's digital signal relocated from its transition period allocation on UHF channel 19 to VHF channel 11. Due to widespread reception problems and a resultant 57% loss of its household viewership in the Dallas–Fort Worth Designated Market Area, on July 23, 2009, the FCC granted KTVT permission via special temporary authorization to move its digital broadcast back to channel 19; concurrently, sister station KTXA was given permission via an STA to move back to channel 18, the assigned digital channel it used during the transition period. The channel change went into effect on August 4, 2009. Prior to that time, KTXA simulcast KTVT's programming on digital subchannel 21.2 (which would eventually be reinstated in December 2013 as an affiliate of MeTV). KTVT broadcast on UHF channel 19, in addition to operating its digital signal secondarily on its original analog and post-transition digital channel 11, until November 2012; both feeds were mapped to virtual channel 11.1, which caused many digital converter boxes and built-in tuners in digital-capable television sets to display that channel twice when tuning sequentially.

On September 10, 2009, the FCC issued a Report & Order statement, approving KTVT's move from channel 11 to channel 19; On October 21, 2009, it filed a minor change application for its new allotment, for which the FCC granted a construction permit the following month on November 19. concurrently, the agency granted KTXA's application to move its digital allocation from UHF channel 18 to channel 29, with the FCC granting them a construction permit on the date that KTVT received approval of its modified digital channel transfer application.

On November 26, 2012, KTVT terminated its original digital signal on VHF channel 11 and moved to its new channel 19 transmitting facilities (which operate from the same tower that KTXA's transmitter occupies).

== See also ==
- Channel 19 digital TV stations in the United States
- Channel 11 virtual TV stations in the United States
