= Ed Turner (television executive) =

American television executive

Ed Turner (September 25, 1935 – March 30, 2002) was a CNN executive vice president and one of the first people Ted Turner hired in 1980 to help make his dream of a 24/7 news network a reality.

Turner—no relation to Ted Turner—was a well-known figure throughout the industry for his approach to news. A veteran journalist, Turner served as Metromedia's corporate news director before joining United Press International Television News. After UPITN, Turner moved to CBS where he produced the CBS Morning News show. Turner served at CNN until 1998, when he left his position as vice president in charge of news-gathering. He died of cancer in 2002 at the age of 66.
