= Goldstein, Samuelson, Inc. =

American commodities options brokerage firm

Goldstein, Samuelson, Inc. was a Los Angeles based commodities options brokerage firm. It was placed in receivership in 1973 after it was discovered that the firm was a Ponzi scheme.

== History ==
The company was founded in 1971 by Harold Goldstein with an initial investment of $800. The name Samuelson was added to the firm's title, although there was no one by the name of Samuelson associated with the firm. The company grew in 18 months to have over 100 branch offices and 1800 brokers, with annual revenues of $45 million. The company was one of the first firms to mass market the selling of naked options and became the nation's largest seller of commodity options. The company operated as a Ponzi scheme with trading "gains" paid to their current customers being paid off with funds from later customers. The company told customers that they were hedging the options by trading in commodities when in actuality no trades were being executed.

== Financial fraud ==
In November 1972, the Securities and Exchange Commission sued Goldstein, Samuelson, Inc., charging fraudulent misrepresentations and omissions in the sale of some options. The suit was settled by a consent decree. However, the company was placed in receivership in February 1973 by the California Corporations Commissioner and filed bankruptcy two months later. Customer losses were estimated at up to $70 million. Goldstein reportedly took millions of dollars in customer funds and deposited them in a Swiss bank. Goldstein was arrested in May 1973 and charged with 15 counts of mail fraud and one count of perjury. He pled guilty to three counts of mail fraud and In March 1974 was sentenced to 18 months in prison.

According to law professor Jerry Markham and others, Goldstein Samuelson's fraud was a major factor in the passage of the Commodity Futures Trading Commission Act of 1974, which created the Commodity Futures Trading Commission.

Harold Goldstein was later involved in a number of illegal business schemes. In 1976, he pleaded guilty to 15 counts of mail fraud involving a gold investment venture. He was investigated in 1980 for his involvement in a company called Co Petro Marketing Group that sold gasoline futures. He was called "L.A.'s Ultimate Bunco Artist" by Los Angeles magazine. In 1983, he was sentenced to ten years in prison for his involvement in a loan fraud-swindle. In 1987, he was arrested again for defrauding a clothing manufacturer out of $903,000. In the late 1990s, he was involved in a phony certificate of deposit scam and served 30-months in prison. He was arrested in 2003 and later convicted for impersonating an attorney. He was sentenced to 12 years and served four years. In 2009, he was sent back to jail for two years for violating parole by impersonating an attorney again.
