= Tracy Rowlett =

American journalist

Charles Tracy Rowlett (/ˈraʊlɪt/; born June 16, 1942), known professionally as Tracy Rowlett, is an American journalist, formerly anchor and managing editor of the CBS owned and operated station in Dallas-Fort Worth, KTVT.

Rowlett's last broadcast with KTVT was at 5pm on July 11, 2008. He moved to a start-up web news site called Shale.TV, focusing on the development of natural gas plays across the U.S. The site was owned by Branded News of Oklahoma City, but sponsored by Chesapeake Energy. In October 2008, prior to start up, Chesapeake withdrew funding and the site folded.

Rowlett earned his bachelor's degree from Wichita State University in broadcasting and journalism, and received his master's degree from the University of Texas at Dallas.

He began his career as a sports reporter for the Wichita Beacon in Wichita, Kansas. He later served in the Air Force, where he was editor of the base newspaper. He was later transferred to Wheelus Air Base in Tripoli, where he worked for Armed Forces Radio and Television.

When John F. Kennedy was assassinated, Rowlett was still serving at Tripoli, and broke the news of the assassination to that part of the middle east. Over the next three days and nights, he reported events surrounding the assassination, Lee Harvey Oswald's murder, and President Kennedy's funeral.

After Rowlett's military discharge, he worked at KFH radio, and as news director for KAKE radio and television in Wichita. He went on to become news director at KMNS in Sioux City, Iowa, and later as the State Capitol correspondent for KTOK Radio in Oklahoma City, and the Oklahoma News Network.

In April 1974, he moved to the Dallas/Fort Worth area, working as an investigative reporter for WFAA. In August, 1975, he was teamed with Iola Johnson to anchor the 6 and 10 p.m. news. Tracy left WFAA in 1999 to become the main anchor at KTVT (CBS11), where he and Iola would team up again for the station's inaugural 4pm newscast from September 2000-September 2002.

Tracy Rowlett received more than 100 awards during his career, including two duPont-Columbia Awards, several Emmy Awards, as well as various Associated Press and United Press International awards.

He is very involved in the Dallas/Fort Worth community, serving on various boards for local organizations, and has received many community awards for his charity works.
