= Caprock, New Mexico =

Unincorporated community in New Mexico, US

Caprock
- Unincorporated community
- Location within New Mexico
- Coordinates: 33°23′31″N 103°42′45″W
- Country: United States of America
- State: New Mexico
- County: Lea County
- Established: 1913
- Founded by: Edward Crossland
- Elevation: 4,377 ft (1,334 m)
- Time zone: UTC-7:00 (MST)
  - Summer (DST): UTC-6:00 (MDT)
- Zip code: 88213
- GNIS feature ID: 898528

Caprock is an unincorporated community in Lea County, New Mexico, United States. Caprock is located on a geological formation in the high plains, approximately 47 miles (76 km) east of Roswell. U.S. Route 380 passes through the community. It was founded by Edward Crossland, who planted the cottonwoods in the area, in 1913. A post office was established in 1916. Caprock's school closed in 1927.

== Points of interest ==
- KOBR-TV Tower
