= Dave Ward (reporter) =

American television news anchor (1939–2025)

David Henry Ward
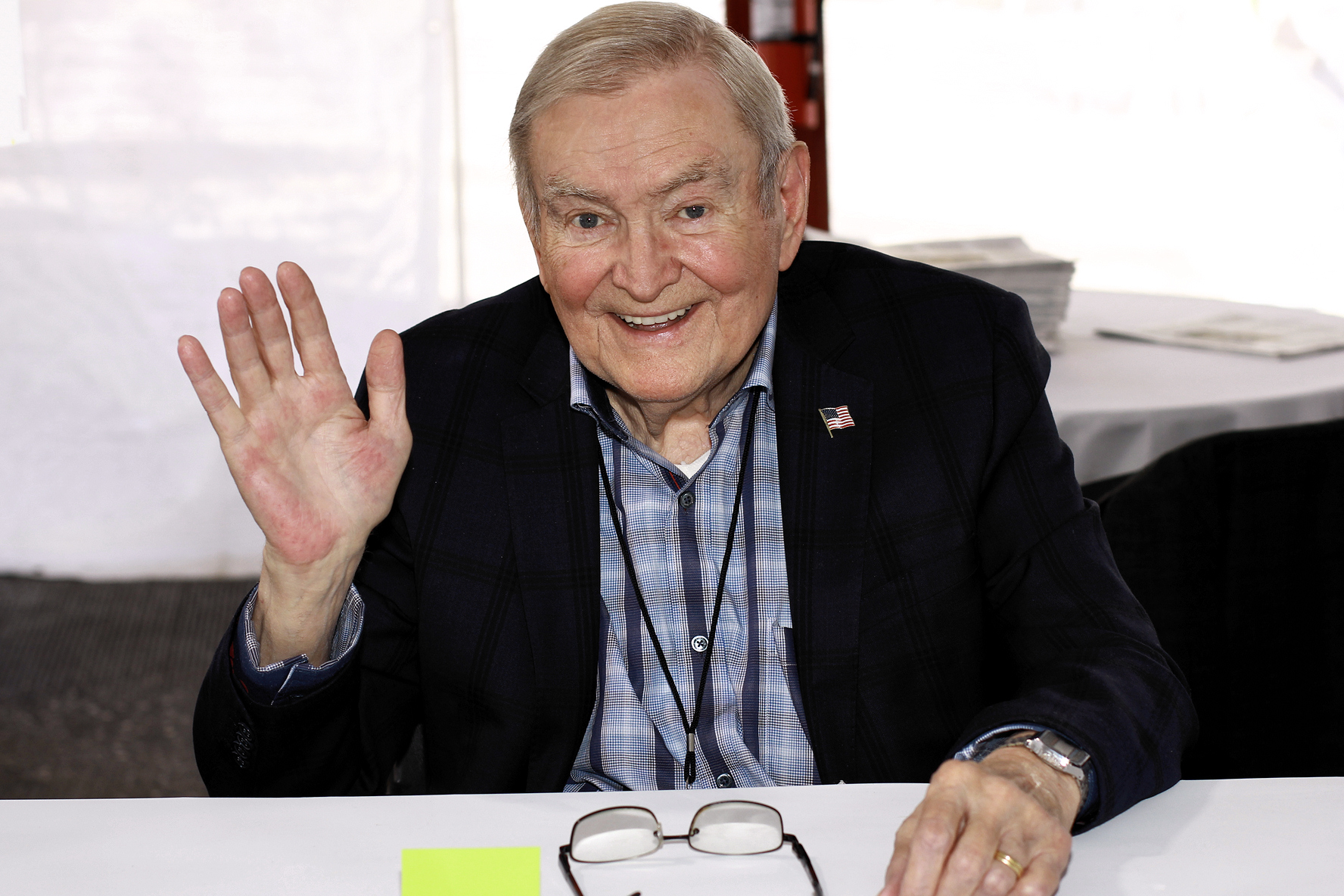
- Ward at the 2019 Texas Book Festival
- Born: David Henry Ward; May 6, 1939; Dallas, Texas, U.S.
- Died: December 13, 2025 (aged 86)
- Occupation: Television newscaster
- Notable credit: KTRK-TV Newscaster 1966–2017
- Spouse: Laura Ward
- Children: Jonathan Ward, Chris Ward, Linda Ann Ward-Heatley, David Henry Ward, Jr.

David Henry Ward (May 6, 1939 – December 13, 2025) was an American broadcast journalist in Houston, Texas. He was an anchor of the weekday 6pm newscast on KTRK-TV's Eyewitness News in Houston for more than 50 years. He joined KTRK-TV in 1966 as reporter and photographer and was promoted to his final position as weekday evening anchor in 1968, which he held until 2017.

== Early life ==
Ward was born on May 6, 1939, in Dallas, Texas, even though his family lived in Huntsville.

== Career ==
Ward began his career at KGKB radio while attending Tyler Junior College (class of 1960). Three years later, he began working at WACO-FM as a staff announcer. Later in 1963, Ward became the first full-time reporter at KNUZ radio, located in Houston. In 1966, he was hired on the spot at KTRK-TV:

...I met with the top people at the station, General Manager Willard Walbridge, Program Manager Howard Finch and News Director Ray Conaway at Le Que, a pool hall, where they went for lunch several days a week and to shoot some pool. I was hired then and there.

He was hired as an on the street reporter and photographer in November 1966 and in 1967 was assigned to anchor KTRK's 7 a.m. newscast and a year later, he was promoted to co-anchor of the weekday 6 p.m. and 10 p.m. weekday newscasts. In December 2014, Ward announced he was leaving the weeknight 10 p.m. broadcast, but would still continue to co-anchor the weekday 6 p.m. newscast with Gina Gaston. In June 2016, Ward was recognized by the Guinness Book of World Records for having the longest tenure of any news anchor in the world at the same station in the same market. On August 4, 2016, Ward announced on the 6 p.m. news that he would be leaving KTRK at the end of the year. Soon after, Ward told the Houston Chronicle he was leaving against his will and did not want to retire, even after multiple falls in the newsroom left his health capricious. Ultimately, the station and Ward agreed to not renew his contract and that he would leave in December 2016. Prior to that date, another health scare delayed his departure. Ward underwent an open heart surgery in December, and the managers at the station decided to let Ward have a final newscast appearance on May 2, 2017.

Ward, a personal friend of Marvin Zindler, helped Zindler obtain his position at Channel 13, by urging the station to hire him after Zindler had been fired from his job at the sheriff's department.

In May 2019, Ward published his memoir, “Good Evening, Friends.” The title reflects the salutation he used to begin each newscast at KTRK. The City of Houston honored Ward's 50 years at KTRK with an honorary street sign outside the ABC 13 studios. The marker says "Honorary Dave Ward Place."

== Positions and achievements ==
In addition to his television and radio career, he played an active role in establishing Houston Crime Stoppers, having served as President of the local Easter Seals Society, and chairing the Public Affairs Advisory Board of the Houston Business Council.

== Death ==
Ward died on December 13, 2025, at the age of 86.

== Video ==
- 1972 Commercial: "Move Closer To Your World" on YouTube
