= KHOU =

Television station in Houston

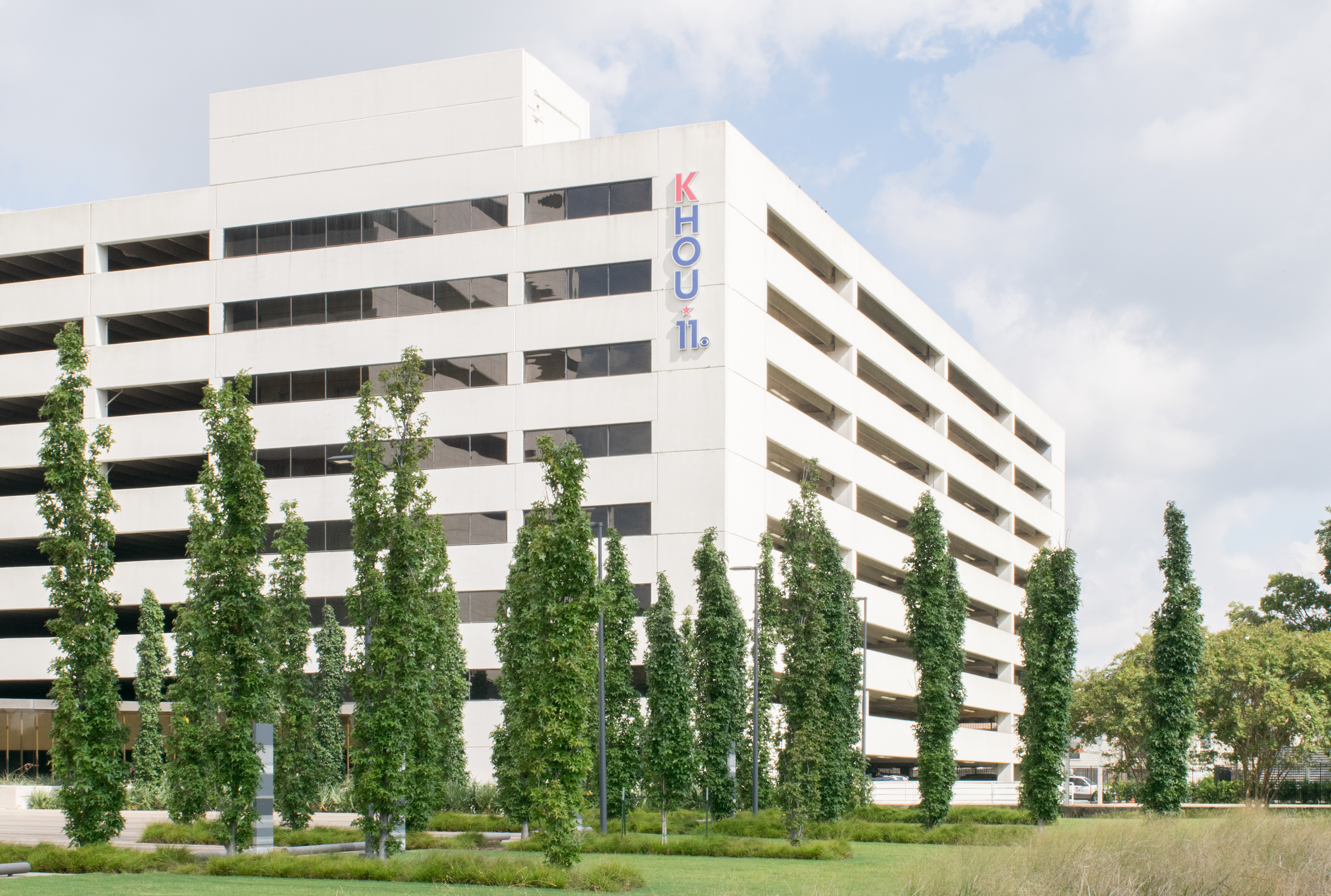
- KHOU moved into the Westheimer Road studios in 2019.
- Houston, Texas; United States
- Channels: Digital: 11 (VHF); Virtual: 11
- Branding: KHOU 11

Programming
- Affiliations: 11.1: CBS; for others, see § Technical information and subchannels

Ownership
- Owner: Tegna Inc., a subsidiary of Nexstar Media Group; (KHOU-TV, Inc.)
- Sister stations: KTBU, Nexstar: KIAH

History
- First air date: March 22, 1953 (Note: Originally licensed to Galveston, Texas; license moved to Houston in 1959.)
- Former call signs: KGUL-TV (1953–1959); KHOU-TV (1959–2009)
- Former channel numbers: Analog: 11 (VHF, 1953–2009); Digital: 31 (UHF, 1998–2009)
- Call sign meaning: Houston (also the ICAO airport code for the William P. Hobby Airport)

Technical information
- Licensing authority: FCC
- Facility ID: 34529
- ERP: 60 kW
- HAAT: 593 m (1,946 ft)
- Transmitter coordinates: 29°33′40″N 95°30′4″W
- Translator(s): KTBU 11.11 (33 UHF) Conroe

Links
- Public license information: Public file; LMS
- Website: www.khou.com

KHOU (channel 11) is a television station in Houston, Texas, United States, affiliated with CBS. It is owned by the Tegna subsidiary of Nexstar Media Group alongside KTBU (channel 55); Nexstar also owns CW station KIAH (channel 39). KHOU and KTBU share studios on Westheimer Road near Uptown Houston; KHOU's transmitter is located near Missouri City, in unincorporated northeastern Fort Bend County. Houston is the largest television market where the CBS station is not owned and operated by the network.

== History ==
The station first signed on the air on March 22, 1953, as KGUL-TV (either Gulf of Mexico or seagull). It was founded by Paul Taft of the Taft Broadcasting Co. (no relation to the Cincinnati-based company of the same name nor its associated Taft family). Originally licensed to Galveston, it was the second television station to debut in the Houston market (after KPRC-TV, channel 2), taking the secondary CBS affiliation from KPRC-TV as the network's new primary affiliate, and has stayed aligned with the network ever since. One of the original investors in the station was actor James Stewart, along with a small group of other Galveston investors. The studio was located at 2002 45th Street in Galveston.

In 1956, the original owners sold the station to the Indianapolis-based Whitney Corporation (later Corinthian Broadcasting), which became a subsidiary of Dun & Bradstreet in 1971. In June 1959, the station changed its callsign to KHOU-TV (the "-TV" suffix was dropped from the call letters the week following the June 12, 2009, digital transition, as most Belo stations did at the time) and had its city of license relocated to Houston. The Federal Communications Commission (FCC) license listed both the Houston and Galveston service areas for a time. On April 24, 1960, the station moved to its first Houston facilities at 1945 Allen Parkway, along Buffalo Bayou in the Neartown neighborhood west of downtown Houston.

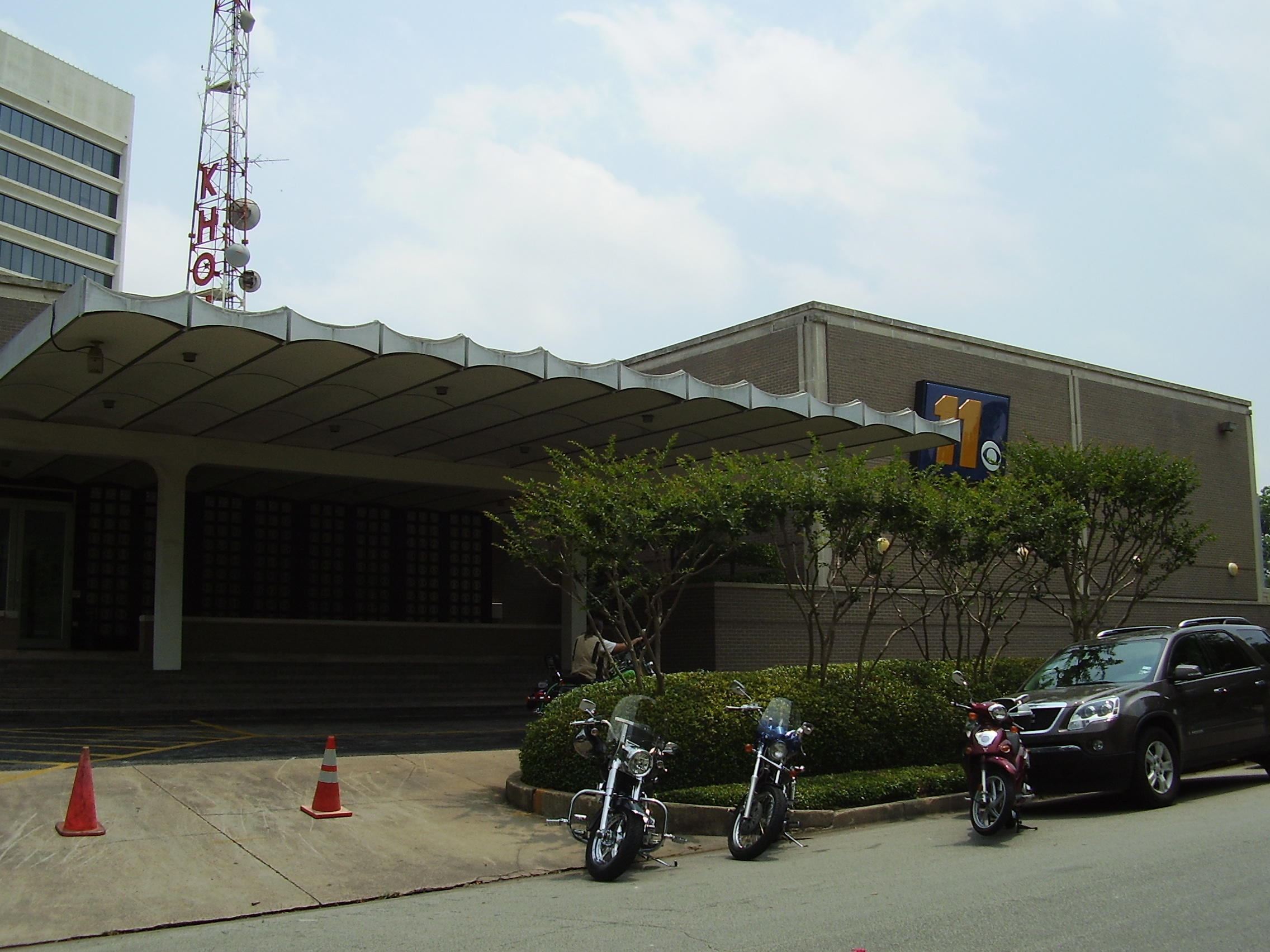
KHOU's former studios and offices in Neartown Houston.

=== Belo ownership ===
In 1984, Dun & Bradstreet sold its entire broadcasting division, including KHOU, to the Belo Corporation, who spun off its Beaumont station, KFDM-TV (channel 6) in order to comply with FCC regulations at the time. KFDM provided at least grade B coverage to much of the eastern portion of the Houston market, with portions of Liberty County getting a city-grade signal. In those days, the FCC normally did not allow common ownership of two stations with overlapping signals, and would not even consider a waiver for a city-grade overlap.

Known for its ownership of The Dallas Morning News and its flagship TV station in its home city of Dallas, WFAA (historically one of ABC's strongest affiliates and a local news powerhouse in that city), Belo began to make significant investments into KHOU, which had become one of CBS' weakest affiliates during the 1980s under the final years of Dun & Bradstreet ownership. With the addition of stronger syndicated programming including the popular game shows Wheel of Fortune and Jeopardy! (both of which were picked up from KPRC-TV) and The Oprah Winfrey Show (which KTRK-TV turned down), the revamping of its news department, and the carrying over of both its Dallas flagship's theme music and popular image branding, The Spirit of Texas, KHOU began to challenge KTRK and KPRC in the local ratings, and eventually became one of CBS' strongest affiliates by the 1990s during a very challenging period for the network. In 1998, KHOU became the first television station in the market to begin broadcasting a high definition digital signal.

On June 13, 2013, the Gannett Company announced that it would acquire Belo for $1.5 billion and the assumption of debt, marking the company's entry into the Texas market and ending KHOU's nearly three decades of ownership by Belo. The sale was completed on December 23. Two years later, on June 29, 2015, the Gannett Company split in two, with one side specializing in print media and the other side specializing in broadcast and digital media. KHOU was retained by the latter company, which would be named Tegna.

=== Hurricane Harvey ===
Being situated near Buffalo Bayou in an area that had become prone to flooding, KHOU's longtime studios had become vulnerable to damage from major hurricanes and severe weather as the Houston area grew exponentially over the last six decades. On the night of June 8, 2001, the station's studios flooded during Tropical Storm Allison, resulting in damage to much of the station's offices including its newsroom. The damage was so severe that the station had to cease its ongoing coverage of the ensuing flash flood emergency (which itself had interrupted regular programming that night) and instead broadcast a West Coast feed of the Late Show with David Letterman, followed by a feed from the station's doppler radar for roughly 90 minutes until the station could resume its breaking news coverage which lasted the entire weekend. During Hurricane Ike, which hit the Texas Gulf Coast in mid-September 2008, KHOU's storm coverage was distributed nationwide via DirecTV and XM Satellite Radio, as well as through a live feed on the station's website.

On August 21, 2017, KHOU began covering Hurricane Harvey as the storm was projected to hit the Texas Gulf Coast with extensive rainfall expected in the Greater Houston area. The station began wall-to-wall coverage on August 25, 2017, with extensive coverage of the storm's landfall in Rockport (near Corpus Christi). While initial coverage focused on storm damage and cleanup in parts of KHOU's viewing area, by the following Saturday, August 26, massive and continuous rain bands from the Gulf of Mexico led to catastrophic flooding throughout the metropolitan area, with much of the flooding being unprecedented in many places.

On the early morning of Sunday, August 27, KHOU was forced to evacuate its studios due to rising floodwaters from the nearby Buffalo Bayou. Around 6 a.m., the first floor of the building became inundated with floodwaters, forcing station employees to completely abandon its facility nearly three hours later after a move to a second floor conference room proved to only be a short-term option, though critical equipment (such as the studio's robotic cameras) was also moved up to the second floor before the flooding became worse. The station's brand-new news set (which had debuted in November 2016), weather center, newsroom and master control were destroyed by the floodwaters, which rose up to five feet (2 m) within the building. Additionally, the station's over the air signal, including its CBS and diginet feeds, were knocked off the air as computers and other equipment became submerged by floodwaters, with staff relegated to providing updates on social media.

After KHOU's signal was knocked off the air, sister station WFAA began providing live news coverage for KHOU by live-streaming on both station's websites and social media profiles until the station was able to resume broadcasting on its own. Seven hours of news were anchored by WFAA's David Schechter and Jason Wheeler. KHOU's staff then evacuated to the nearby Federal Reserve Bank of Dallas Houston Branch building on higher ground while a new contingency plan was drafted.

With the assistance of PBS member station KUHT (channel 8) and master control from WFAA, KHOU eventually resumed live broadcasting later that night from temporary facilities at the LeRoy and Lucile Melcher Center for Public Broadcasting on the campus of the University of Houston. At various times, WFAA, along with Tegna NBC affiliate KUSA in Denver, provided assistance with weather graphics and master control. Due to technical difficulties, WFAA originated the August 27 edition of the 10 p.m. news that was simulcast in both cities. Eventually a reliable signal was established an hour later from KUHT's studios at the Melcher Center and storm coverage continued. KHOU is the third commercial station in Houston to utilize a part of the UH campus for its facilities, after ill-fated KNUZ-TV (channel 39) from 1953 to 1954 and KTRK-TV (channel 13) from its 1954 launch until its 1961 move to its current studios in the Upper Kirby district.

On the evening of August 31, the station resumed CBS programming with its prime time lineup. For the first month, the station only broadcast its main HD channel while its two subchannels (at the time Bounce TV and Justice Network) remained shut down. The following week, on September 4, KHOU began to reuse parts of its previous 2011–2016 news set in the temporary studio. On October 4, the subchannels returned as widescreen SD simulcasts of the main channel in preparation for the eventual return of the diginets, which would finally return on October 12. Around the same time, the station's on-air look returned to normal with full news and weather graphics restored and program guide listings on the terrestrial signal. A temporary news set, similar in design to its previous news set destroyed in the Harvey floods with additional brick accents, would eventually be constructed for the station at the Houston Public Media facilities.

=== Move to Westheimer studios ===
On November 16, 2017, KHOU officially announced it would not return to the Allen Parkway facility; the building would eventually be sold to an affiliate of Service Corporation International (whose headquarters are located in an office building adjacent to the former KHOU studios) and was eventually demolished the following May. In December 2017, KHOU announced that it would open a secondary street-side studio at the George R. Brown Convention Center along Avenida Houston. The studio opened in the fall of 2018, and is primarily used for its weekday newscasts. This setup is similar to that of Dallas sister station WFAA's Victory Park studio, which opened a decade earlier in January 2007.

On March 29, 2018, KHOU announced that it had signed a lease for 43,000 square feet (3,995 m^{2}) of space at 5718 Westheimer Road near Uptown Houston (Galleria area). The station occupies three floors of the high-rise in facilities that include two studios, two control rooms, an open collaboration space for all content producing departments, technical operations, sales and executive offices. The station began its operations from its new facility on Sunday, February 17, 2019, during its 10 p.m. newscast.

On January 21, 2020, KHOU would gain a sister station when Tegna acquired KTBU (channel 55) from Spanish Broadcasting System which had been airing its Mega TV service over that station; the sale was completed on March 24 with KTBU moving its operations three days later into KHOU's Westheimer facilities and dropping Mega TV in favor of Tegna's digital multicast network, Quest, which had previously been airing on KHOU's fourth digital subchannel. While KTBU may serve as an alternate CBS affiliate should KHOU need its main signal for long-form breaking news and severe weather coverage, its primary role has been to serve as a UHF rebroadcaster of KHOU's digital signal (which remains on VHF channel 11).

On February 22, 2022, Tegna announced that it would be acquired by Standard General and Apollo Global Management for $5.4 billion. As a part of the deal, KHOU and KTBU, along with their Austin sister station KVUE and Dallas sister stations WFAA and KMPX, would be resold to Cox Media Group. The sale was canceled on May 22, 2023.

Nexstar Media Group, owner of KIAH (channel 39), acquired Tegna in a deal announced in August 2025 and completed on March 19, 2026. A temporary restraining order issued one week later by the U.S. District Court for the Eastern District of California, later escalated to a preliminary injunction, has prevented Nexstar from integrating the stations.

== Programming ==
Since its inception, KHOU has been a CBS affiliate, and has largely cleared the entire CBS network lineup without interruption. In addition to its newscasts, KHOU also airs Great Day Houston, a local talk show hosted by Deborah Duncan with paid segments from local businesses in Houston, following CBS Mornings. The talk show, which has aired on the station since 2005, is taped at KHOU's studios on Westheimer Road west of the Galleria. KHOU also serves as the local television broadcaster of Houston's annual Thanksgiving Day parade, the H-E-B Holiday Parade.

Despite being in a market with an ABC-owned station (KTRK-TV), Jeopardy! aired on KHOU from 1986 to 2015 and Wheel of Fortune has aired on that station since 1986 despite their presence on ABC's other network-owned stations along with another ABC O&O syndication staple, The Oprah Winfrey Show, which KHOU carried for its entire run from 1986 to 2011. Jeopardy! moved to KTRK on September 14, 2015, making it the last ABC-owned station to carry the quiz show. However, KHOU continues to carry Wheel of Fortune at 6:30 p.m., making Houston one of the few markets in the United States where both game shows air on separate stations; in most markets, both game shows are sold as a package, often airing next to one another on the same station in prime time access. Both shows rarely air next to each other in most markets in the Central and Mountain time zones, as most network affiliates often program a 6 p.m. newscast during the traditional access hour (7 p.m. ET/6 p.m. CT) before prime time, with KTRK itself having aired an hourlong 6 p.m. newscast in this hour since September 1982.

In 1987, KHOU refused to air a television adaptation of the then-popular Garbage Pail Kids trading card series on Saturday mornings, owing to concerns regarding the show's ridicule of the disabled and its abundance of heavy violence; as a result of these decisions and concerns, CBS decided to remove the series from their Saturday morning schedule for the 1987–88 television season, and the series, to date, has never been telecast in the United States.

Like most CBS affiliates prior to 1993, KHOU often carried syndicated programming (including Entertainment Tonight and reruns of M*A*S*H) in late night following its 10 p.m. newscast, as the network's late night offerings of the era were considered to be less lucrative compared to syndicated offerings. Beginning in 1993, KHOU (like most CBS affiliates) began carrying the Late Show (then hosted by David Letterman) at 11:05 p.m. CT, eventually moving it to immediately following its 10 p.m. newscast (at 10:35 p.m. CT) by 1995. However, the station had always aired The Late Late Show on a 30-minute delay (beginning at 12:07 a.m. CT) since the show first premiered in 1995, fitting a syndicated sitcom, game show or tabloid news program between the two shows. Because the latter program's original host, Tom Snyder, had a simulcast with the CBS Radio Network (which aired locally on KPRC-AM) and took calls from viewers during his stint as host, KHOU asked via disclaimer for Houston area viewers to not call the toll-free call-in number due to the tape-delay. This practice would continue under later hosts Craig Kilborn and Craig Ferguson, as well as the first few months of James Corden's tenure as host.

On September 8, 2015, it began airing The Late Late Show at its network-approved time (11:37 p.m. CT) following Stephen Colbert's debut as host of The Late Show; leaving the station's only CBS preemption being that of the second half-hour of the Sunday morning talk show Face the Nation, which had been tape-delayed to 2:30 a.m. the following Monday morning due to KHOU's longstanding broadcasts of religious programs from Houston-based Lakewood Church and Second Baptist Church, with the former also airing on Sunday night following its 10 p.m. newscast and KHOU 11 Sports Extra (see below). After Lakewood's broadcasts moved to KTRK in 2020 (only to return to KHOU at 11 p.m. only on Sunday nights the following year), Face the Nation began airing its full hour at 9:30 a.m., where the first half-hour had already been airing for years, with the religious broadcast from Second Baptist Church continuing to air at 10:30 a.m.

=== Sports programming ===
In 2002, the Houston Texans joined the NFL as the league's 32nd franchise, as part of the American Football Conference's newly formed South Division. Being part of the AFC, most Texans games—including all road games against NFC opponents—are aired on CBS (which has held the contract to carry AFC games since the 1998 season), and are therefore aired locally on KHOU. The station also served as the over-the-air outlet for all of the Texans' appearances on Thursday Night Football until 2018 (when Fox picked up the full rights to the Thursday night package that lasted until 2021, thus moving those telecasts locally to KRIV), and have aired simulcasts of ESPN's Monday Night Football in the past (due to ABC's live broadcast of Dancing with the Stars on KTRK conflicting with the games). The Texans are one of two teams never to have been blacked out at home, the other being the Baltimore Ravens; this stands in contrast to the city's previous NFL team, the Houston Oilers, who were often blacked out at home in their twilight years in Houston before moving to Nashville in 1997 for reasons related to the team's controversial management under owner Bud Adams. Beginning in 2014, with the institution of 'cross-flex' rules, games in which the Texans play an NFC opponent at home can be moved from Fox O&O KRIV (channel 26) to KHOU, with the same standard also applying for AFC road games at NRG Stadium being moved over to KRIV.

Other notable appearances by Houston sports teams on KHOU have included the Houston Rockets' 1981 and 1986 appearances in the NBA Finals (both losses to the Boston Celtics; all Rockets games broadcast through CBS' NBA broadcast contract were aired on KHOU from 1973 to 1990) and the University of Houston men's basketball team's three NCAA National Championship appearances in 1983, 1984, and 2025, and their other Final Four appearance in 2021—all via their national coverage by CBS Sports. KHOU also carried Southwest Conference football and men's basketball games (with an emphasis on games involving the University of Houston and Rice University) on Saturday afternoons before the conference folded in 1996, as well as CBS' broadcasts of the 2011 and the 2023 NCAA Final Fours and Super Bowls VIII (1974) and XXXVIII (2004)—all of which took place in Houston. Presently, KHOU may also carry select games from the National Women's Soccer League's Houston Dash.

On October 22, 2026, Tegna announced a multi-year deal with the WNBA's Houston Comets to air the team's non-national exclusive games on KTBU and Space City Home Network (with select contests simulcast on KHOU) beginning in the 2027 season.

=== News operation ===
KHOU presently broadcasts 36 hours, 25 minutes of locally produced newscasts each week (with 6 hours, 5 minutes each weekday and three hours each on Saturdays and Sundays). On weekdays, this includes a two-hour morning newscast from 5 to 7 a.m., a full hour at 4 p.m., and half-hours at noon, 5 p.m., 6 p.m. and 10 p.m. Its weekend newscasts include a one-hour morning newscast on Saturday morning, hour-long newscasts at 10 p.m. on Saturday and on Sunday morning, and half-hours at 6 p.m. on Saturday and 5:30 p.m. and 10 p.m. on Sunday. The station also airs KHOU 11 Sports Extra, which features extensive Sunday night sports coverage and commentary, following its 10 p.m. newscast on Sunday night.

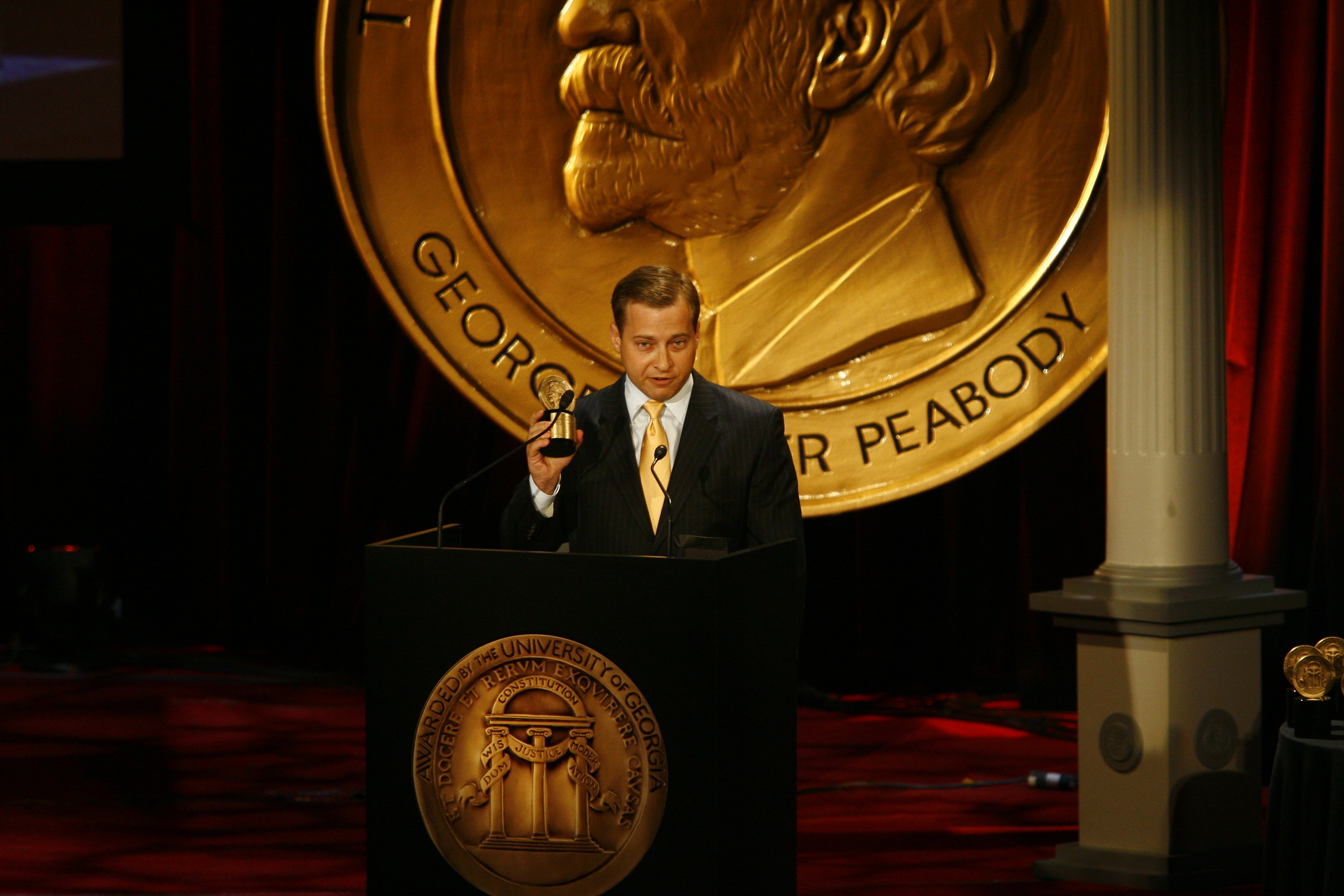
Mark Greenblatt at the 69th Annual Peabody Awards for "Under Fire: Discrimination and Corruption in the Texas National Guard"

Throughout its existence, KHOU has been widely regarded as a stepping stone for many well-known television news personalities, as many of its reporters have gone on to work for national networks. KHOU's best known former on-air staffers include former CBS Evening News anchor Dan Rather, NBC News correspondent Dennis Murphy, newswomen Linda Ellerbee and Jessica Savitch, and sports anchors Jim Nantz (now the lead announcer for CBS Sports), Harry Kalas (later a legendary broadcaster for Major League Baseball and NFL Films) and Ron Franklin (later with ESPN). Outside of broadcasting, one of its former sports anchors, Dan Patrick, eventually became Lieutenant Governor of Texas.

KHOU also has gained a reputation for its investigative reporting staff (currently known as KHOU 11 Investigates), whose most notable stories include its 2000 investigation into defective tire designs by Firestone – which led to the mandatory recall of Wilderness AT, Firestone ATX and ATX II tires, as well as numerous lawsuits (the defective tires resulted in a number of deaths, including that of KTRK reporter Stephen Gauvain), a story in the early 2000s that led to the shutdown of the Houston Police Department's crime lab, and allegations of dropout rate fraud in the Houston Independent School District, which resulted in the dismissal of several HISD officials. All of these stories were initially reported by investigative reporter Anna Werner, who eventually went on to become the chief investigative reporter for CBS News.

==== History ====
Despite not being historically associated with a major newspaper, and being based in Galveston for most of the 1950s, news has always played an integral role in the history of KHOU. The station gained notoriety in 1961 when then-anchor Dan Rather showed what was believed to be the first radar image of a hurricane broadcast on television during Hurricane Carla; this report, which was credited for saving thousands of lives that otherwise would have been lost, would later become a catalyst in his eventual hiring by CBS News. In 1970, KHOU had boasted of the top-rated news team in Houston, led by anchorman Ron Stone (who had been discovered by Rather in 1961), weatherman Sid Lasher and sports director Ron Franklin.

The station entered a tumultuous period during the early 1970s, when Stone departed for a radio reporter role with NBC News in New York and Lasher died from a fatal heart attack in a station breakroom shortly after KHOU's 6 p.m. newscast concluded one night. Stone would eventually return to Houston in 1972 to become the lead anchor at KPRC-TV, and helped that station to overtake KHOU as the leading news station in Houston; both stations would eventually be overtaken by KTRK-TV, whose Eyewitness News came to dominate the Houston market for the next several decades and which had become one of ABC's strongest affiliates by the end of the decade, eventually becoming one of the network's owned-and-operated stations in 1986.

While the station did hire former KPRC-TV lead anchor Steve Smith away from KDKA-TV in Pittsburgh to become its lead anchor in 1975 (a role he maintained for the next 24 years at the station), KHOU continued to trail its rivals as the decade progressed. A string of notable departures also did not help the station's cause, including the 1976 departure of chief meteorologist Doug Brown (who himself succeeded Lasher) to KTRK where he became that station's longtime morning meteorologist, and the subsequent departures to KPRC of news anchors Bob Nicholas (one of Houston's first African-American news anchors) in 1979 and Bill Balleza in 1980, with the latter also joined that year by the aforementioned Ron Franklin, who moved to KHOU to fill the same role of sports director at KPRC. As a result, channel 11 crashed to last place, and would largely remain entrenched in this position throughout the 1980s.

When Belo acquired KHOU in 1984, the station continued to trail behind dominant KTRK and NBC affiliate KPRC, which usually placed a strong second and would further benefit in the decade from NBC's strong prime time programming of the 1980s. Its newscasts fared even worse than CBS' own floundering network programming itself at the time, occasionally even placing behind syndicated reruns on independent stations in the Houston market. Having achieved considerable success with the news department of its flagship station in Dallas, WFAA, since the 1970s, Belo sought to seek similar results for KHOU, and beginning in the late 1980s hired several high-profile people to its news team. The most notable was former National Hurricane Center director Dr. Neil Frank, who was hired as the station's chief meteorologist in July 1987. In another key move, KHOU also hired former KTRK morning anchor Sylvan Rodriguez (then a correspondent with ABC News' West Coast bureau) to anchor the station's early evening newscasts.

During this time, KHOU also commissioned an image rebrand using the "Spirit of Texas" slogan and (initially) TM Productions' "Spirit" music package that originated at its Dallas sister station WFAA. In January 1989, KHOU revamped the appearance of its newscasts, with an image campaign that included full-page ads in the Houston Chronicle and Post, as well as an on-air promotional campaign that focused more on ordinary citizens throughout Greater Houston than on its news team. With a main team consisting of anchors Steve Smith and Marlene McClinton (who the station hired from WMAQ-TV in Chicago), chief meteorologist Dr. Neil Frank and sports director Giff Nielsen (a former Houston Oilers quarterback who became KHOU's lead sports anchor following his retirement from the NFL in 1984), along with a new set, graphics and theme music, KHOU began to mount a serious challenge to its longtime competitors, evolving into a competitive ratings race during the 1990s. Its resurgent newscasts, combined with a strong syndicated programming lineup, helped to sustain the station through what would be a turbulent ratings period for CBS, which lost broadcast rights to NFL games in addition to several of its largest affiliates (including its longtime affiliates in Dallas and Austin) during this time.

1999 proved to be a breakout year for KHOU, with its newscasts reaching #1 in viewership in several timeslots during the May sweeps period, unseating KTRK during the midday hours, and at 5 p.m. (it debuted in May 1974) and 6 p.m., which also coincided with CBS' resurgence to number one in prime time by that year. The station's ratings boost, aided by its continuously strong syndicated lineup and a series of high-profile investigative reports by the station, also included an exclusive interview with Serbian and Yugoslavian President Slobodan Milosevic during the Kosovo War, just a month before his indictment, that drew international news coverage.

This news came despite the station losing three of its core anchors key to the station's resurgence: longtime anchor Steve Smith, who retired from broadcasting in May 1999 to pursue other interests, his fellow anchor Marlene McClinton, who abruptly resigned during one of the station's newscasts in September 1999, and 6 p.m. anchor Sylvan Rodriguez, who had been diagnosed with pancreatic cancer and eventually succumbed to the disease in April 2000. Two former local newscasters in New York City, Greg Hurst of ABC flagship WABC-TV and Len Cannon of Fox flagship WNYW (the latter also a former NBC News correspondent and substitute anchor), would respectively join the station, with Hurst succeeding Smith as lead anchor in 1999 and Cannon joining the station in 2006 to replace longtime anchor Jerome Gray, who went to rival KPRC-TV. Cannon himself became lead anchor in 2017 after Hurst left the station (with Hurst eventually joining fellow CBS affiliate WREG-TV in Memphis).

On February 4, 2007, following CBS' coverage of Super Bowl XLI, KHOU began broadcasting its local newscasts in high definition, becoming the first station in the market to do so. On September 7, 2009, KHOU-TV expanded its weekday morning newscast with the addition of the 4:30 a.m. program First Look; despite being the last station in the Houston market to launch a 4:30 a.m. newscast, KHOU was the only station in the market to announce its intentions to do so (three of Houston's major network affiliates – KHOU, KTRK-TV and KPRC-TV – launched 4:30 a.m. newscasts within three weeks of each other in the late summer of 2009 with little fanfare). On August 1, 2011, KHOU debuted a new half-hour newscast at 4 p.m. on weekdays to replace The Oprah Winfrey Show; this would expand to a full hour in 2015 after losing the Houston rights to Jeopardy! to KTRK. Like many CBS and ABC stations in other markets, KHOU has also expanded its weekend 10 p.m. news broadcast to a full hour, including the aforementioned KHOU 11 Sports Extra on Sunday nights.

In 2018, the station rebranded its weekday morning newscasts as HTownRush, with a format emphasizing social media interaction including its own namesake hashtag, a summary of top stories during the first five minutes of each half-hour, and special segments including in-house features exclusive to Tegna stations such as Deal Boss, one-minute business/technology news briefs from Cheddar, and consumer reporter John Matarese's Don't Waste Your Money consumer segments (which usually air on stations owned by the E. W. Scripps Company). In June 2019, KHOU engaged in a similar rebranding process for its 4 p.m. newscast, rebranded as The 411, emphasizing a conceptual format and on-air graphics style similar to that of its morning newscast. KHOU has since dropped the HTownRush branding for its morning newscast as of 2022, instead rebranding as KHOU 11 Morning News.

Unlike most CBS affiliates, the station did not air a Sunday morning newscast until January 5, 2020, with the hour before CBS Sunday Morning instead being filled by one of CBS's three hours of E/I programming which KHOU preempted to carry a Saturday morning newscast in between the two hours of CBS This Morning Saturday. Following the launch of the Sunday morning newscast and subsequent changes in federal regulations on children's television programming, KHOU has since aired two of CBS's three hours of E/I programming from 5 a.m. to 7 a.m. on Saturday morning, followed by the full broadcast of CBS Saturday Morning leading into KHOU's Saturday morning newscast from 9 a.m. to 10:30 a.m.

On August 29, 2026, KHOU began airing a 9 p.m. edition of KHOU 11 News on Nexstar-owned CW station KIAH. This debut came the day after KTRK ended a six-year agreement with KIAH to air 9 p.m. editions of KTRK newscasts.

==== Notable current on-air staff ====
- Jacob Rascon – anchor/reporter

==== Notable former on-air staff ====
- Steve Edwards – anchor/talk show host (1972–1975)
- Linda Ellerbee – reporter (1972–1973)
- Dr. Neil Frank – chief meteorologist (1987–2008)
- Ron Franklin – sports director (1971–1980)
- John Hambrick – anchor/reporter (1960s)
- Joanne Herring – host of The Joanne King Show (1950s–1974)
- Dennis Murphy – reporter/assignment editor (1975–1978)
- Jim Nantz – sports anchor/reporter (early 1980s)
- Chau Nguyen – anchor/reporter (2003–2007)
- Giff Nielsen – sports director (1984–2009)
- Dan Patrick – sports director (1979–1984)
- Dan Rather – anchor/reporter (early 1960s)
- Rick Sanchez – reporter (1986–1988)
- Jessica Savitch – anchor/reporter (1971–1972)
- Janet Shamlian – anchor/reporter (1987–1995)
- Ron Stone – anchor (1961–1972)

=== Criticism ===
On November 24, 2022, KHOU was criticized for interrupting a Thanksgiving Day game between the Buffalo Bills and the Detroit Lions for a tornado warning with 23 seconds left in the game, which caused viewers to miss a last second game-winning field goal by the Bills. The station did not incorporate a picture-in-picture treatment or split-screen format for viewers in Houston to continue watching the game when the weather report was issued. KHOU did not make a public apology after the interruption incident.

== Technical information and subchannels ==
KHOU's transmitter is located near Missouri City, in unincorporated northeastern Fort Bend County. The station's signal is multiplexed:

Subchannels of KHOU
Subchannel	Res.	Short name	Programming
11.1	1080i	KHOU-HD	CBS
11.2	480i	ShopLC	Shop LC
11.3	480i	Crime	True Crime Network
11.4	480i	COMET	Comet
11.5	480i	Roar	Roar
39.2	480i	Ant TV	Antenna TV (KIAH)
39.4	480i	HSN2	HSN2 (KIAH)

Broadcast on behalf of another station

On September 26, 2011, KHOU began broadcasting Bounce TV on its second digital subchannel (which originally launched as a quasi-independent station) upon the network's launch. The station had previously signed on to carry the .2 Network on one of its digital subchannels, although .2 Network never debuted. In 2015, the station began carrying programming from the Justice Network on its third digital subchannel. Quest was added to the fourth digital subchannel on January 16, 2018, and was changed to a simulcast of sister station KTBU after that station switched to the network on March 27, 2020; in February 2021, the fourth digital subchannel became an affiliate of Twist. The fifth digital subchannel, Circle, which was 50 percent owned by Gray Television with the other half owned by a subsidiary of Ryman Hospitality Properties' Opry Entertainment Group, debuted with the network on January 1, 2020. Bounce TV moved to KPXB-DT2 in January 2022. Twist and Circle were both removed on December 31, 2023; the former was discontinued by Tegna, while the latter transitioned into a free ad-supported streaming television (FAST) operation. The fourth digital subchannel became an affiliate of Sinclair Broadcast Group's Comet network in February 2024.

=== Analog-to-digital conversion ===
KHOU ended regular programming on its analog signal, over VHF channel 11, on the morning of June 12, 2009, as part of the federally mandated transition from analog to digital television. The station's digital signal relocated from its pre-transition UHF channel 31 to VHF channel 11.
