= Art Rascon =

American news correspondent born 1962

- Born: 4 December 1962 (age 63); El Paso, Texas
- Education: Brigham Young University
- Awards: Edward R. Murrow award
- Presenting career
- Stations: KTRK-TV, Houston (1998-2022); CBS News (1994-98); KABC-TV, Los Angeles (1989-94)

Art Rascon (born December 4, 1962) is an American former news anchor for Disney-owned KTRK in Houston, Texas. Prior to joining KTRK, he worked as a CBS News correspondent on assignments that included international reporting for the CBS Evening News with Dan Rather and 48 Hours. He also reported for CBS Radio, which earned him a national Edward R. Murrow award for his spot coverage of Hurricane Opal in 1995. Rascon has reported on major events all over the world, covering everything from natural disasters, civil unrest to wars, conflicts throughout the Middle East, Central America and elsewhere. He has traveled to more than 75 countries on five continents and reported from nearly every state in the union. He has been nominated for national and regional Emmy Awards, and by the end of 2016, had earned more than 20 Emmy awards.

Rascon was recognized in 1997 as being one of only five Latino correspondents appearing on national television networks in the U.S., reporting major events for the evening news. He is a former vice president of the National Association of Hispanic Journalists, and was named one of the one-hundred most influential Hispanics in America by Hispanic Business Magazine.

== Early years ==
Rascon was born in El Paso, Texas. While he was still a young boy, Rascon and his family moved to Santa Fe, New Mexico, and later to Albuquerque, but most of his youth was spent growing up in Denver, Colorado. He graduated from Green Mountain High School just outside Denver and began his college studies at Ricks College in 1980. Rascon served a mission for his faith, The Church of Jesus Christ of Latter-day Saints (LDS Church) and then returned to his studies at Brigham Young University (BYU) in Utah. He also spent six months in Madrid, Spain studying European political science, History, Humanities and the Arts. He graduated from BYU in 1985. While in college, Rascon worked as a reporter for KBYU-FM and KBYU-TV.

== Career ==
Rascon began his television career in 1983 in Utah, where he was an associate producer and reporter for then-PBS member station KBYU-TV in Provo, Utah and then for ABC affiliate KTVX-TV in Salt Lake City. In 1985, Rascon moved to Texas where he was a producer, reporter, and anchor for NBC affiliate, KRBC-TV, in Abilene until August 1987, then for ABC affiliate KVIA-TV in El Paso until 1988, and for NBC affiliate KMOL-TV (now WOAI-TV) in San Antonio until he moved to KABC-TV in Los Angeles in August 1989 as a reporter and anchor. There, Rascon reported on natural disasters in California and highly publicized events such as the O. J. Simpson, Rodney King, and Lyle and Erik Menendez trials, the Branch Davidian stand-off, and the 1992 Los Angeles riots among a host of other stories, including brush fires, riots and other natural disasters.

In 1994, Rascon moved to Miami as a CBS Evening News correspondent. While there, he reported on major events that occurred in the southeastern U.S., Mexico, the Caribbean, including reporting on a host of stories out of Cuba and South and Central America. Rascon also covered the Oklahoma City bombing, conflicts and unrest in Haiti, Peru, Mexico, and hurricanes in the region. He interviewed both Manuel Noriega and Daniel Ortega. His spot coverage of Hurricane Opal on CBS Radio and CBS News earned him a national Edward R. Murrow award. He and the 48 Hours team also received an Emmy nomination from The National Academy of Television Arts and Sciences for their coverage of Hurricane Fran.

In 1998, Rascon moved to Houston's ABC-owned station, KTRK-TV where he anchored many newscasts, including a long stint as co-anchor of the 11 a.m. and 5 p.m. editions of 13 Eyewitness News. He has reported on domestic and international events and conflicts, including events in the Middle East, Iraq, Serbia, Kosovo, Bosnia and Central America. He also covered three Papal conclaves. He has reported extensively on the immigration issue, following children, teen and adult immigrants from El Salvador, Honduras, and Guatemala all the way to the U.S. border. Rascon has covered everything from earthquakes to tsunamis and has executive produced and reported numerous half-hour special reports on a variety of subjects and reported from the scene of more than a dozen major hurricanes, including Katrina, Ike, and a host of other storms. He was one of the first to report from Haiti the morning after the quake.

In 2020, Rascon became an area seventy of the LDS Church, which like most other positions in the church is a non-paid position that is conducted while employed in other lines of work. Rascon was president of the church's Houston Texas Summerwood Stake from 2017 to 2020. When the stake was formed in 2012 Rascon was second counselor in the stake presidency. In the LDS Church he has also served as a bishop, bishop's counselor, mission president's counselor, stake mission president, and stake high councilor.

In October 2021, Rascon announced he would step down from his position at KTRK effective January 2022. It was reported that his son, Jacob Rascon, would be joining the station as his replacement. Jacob Rascon, who had left NBC affiliated rival station KPRC-TV prior to the announcement, became one of three hosts for the station’s early morning programming. On January 3, 2022, Art and Jacob co-anchored the 11 a.m. edition of ABC 13 Eyewitness News together, marking the end of the father’s run at the station and beginning of the son’s.

Rascon is also the founder of Rascon Media Group, whose mission is to help individuals and organizations have clear and powerful communication. Two of his five sons, Jacob and Matt (former newscaster with Cleveland NBC affiliate WKYC), respectively serve as consultant and president with Rascon Media Group.

== Honors ==
Rascon has been nominated for and has received many awards, including two national Edward R. Murrow awards, one for his spot coverage of Hurricane Opal in 1995, and 19 Emmy Awards out of 25 nominations. He has also received an RTNDA Award for Continuing Coverage, 18 Associated Press Reporting awards, three National Association of Hispanic Journalists' awards, two National Headliner Awards, and a Rotary International award.

Rascon was once named by The National Hispanic Business Magazine as one of the '100 Most Influential Hispanics in America'. He is an active participant in several local and national charities and has served, or is currently serving on, several notable national and international Boards, including: Executive Board Member of Interfaith of The Woodlands, YMCA International, and the BYU School of Communications Board of Advisors. He has served twice as president of the Houston Association of Hispanic Media Professionals (HAHMP), and is a former board member of the Radio Television News Directors Association (RTNDA).

== Family life ==
In addition to aforementioned sons Jacob (now at Houston CBS affiliate KHOU) and Matt, Art's brother, Dan Rascon, also works in television news as a newscaster with Salt Lake City NBC affiliate KSL-TV.

== Books ==
- Rascon, Art (October 17, 2007). The Heart of the News (1st ed.). RMG Press. ISBN 9789798370052.
- Rascon, Art (August 1998). On Assignment: The Stories Behind The Stories: Inspiring Experiences of an LDS Broadcast Journalist. Covenant Communications Inc. ISBN 9781577342946.
