= Green Mountain High School =

Public school in Colorado, United States

Location
- 13175 West Green Mountain Drive; Lakewood, Colorado 80228; United States
- Coordinates: 39°41′36″N 105°08′42″W

Information
- Type: Public
- Motto: Learning Is Rampant
- Established: 1973 (53 years ago)
- School district: Jefferson County Public Schools
- CEEB code: 060883
- Principal: Josh Shellard
- Faculty: 55.74 (FTE)
- Grades: 9–12
- Enrollment: 1,081 (2023–2024)
- Student to teacher ratio: 19.39
- Campus type: Open campus
- Colors: Black and gold
- Athletics conference: 4A
- Mascot: Ram
- Website: greenmountainhs.jeffcopublicschools.org

Green Mountain High School is a public high school in the western part of the city of Lakewood in Jefferson County, Colorado, United States. It is administered by Jefferson County Public Schools.

== Athletics ==
Green Mountain High School offers the following athletic programs:

- Fall Programs
  - Cross Country
  - Football
  - Gymnastics
  - Golf (Boys')
  - Soccer (Boys')
  - Softball
  - Tennis (Boys')
  - Volleyball
  - Cheer
- Winter Programs
  - Basketball
  - Swim and Dive (Girls')
- Spring Programs
  - Baseball
  - Golf (Girls')
  - Lacrosse
  - Soccer (Girls')
  - Swim and Dive (Boys')
  - Tennis (Girls')
  - Track and Field

== History ==
Green Mountain High School opened in 1973 and graduated its first class of students in 1975. There were no seniors the first year it operated as the school system felt it would be unfair to transfer students from Bear Creek High School to a new school for their senior year.

The Second Wind Fund, a suicide prevention program, was founded in response to the suicide cluster involving four Green Mountain High School students.

== Notable alumni ==
- Guillermo Alvarez, gymnast
- Michelle Beisner-Buck, NFL reporter, host
- Kathleen Belew, Author, historian, television commentator
- Derek Cianfrance, Film director, cinematographer, screenwriter, and editor
- Nicole Hensley, Professional Ice Hockey Player, US Women's National Team Member
- Paul Ray Ramsey, vlogger, YouTube personality and public speaker
- Art Rascon, TV news anchor and correspondent.
