= Second Wind =

Second Wind may refer to:

- Second wind, an exercise phenomenon
- Second wind (sleep), a sleep phenomenon

== Film ==
- Second Wind (1966 film) or Le deuxième souffle, a French film directed by Jean-Pierre Melville
- Second Wind (1976 film), a Canadian film directed by Donald Shebib
- Second Wind (1978 film) or Un second souffle, a French film directed by Gérard Blain
- The Second Wind or Le deuxième souffle, a 2007 French remake of the 1966 film, directed by Alain Corneau

== Music ==
- Second Wind (band), a band formed by former Minor Threat bassist Steve Hansgen

=== Albums ===
- 2nd Wind or the title song, "Second Wind", by Todd Rundgren, 1991
- Second Wind (single album), by BSS, 2023
- Second Wind, by Delbert McClinton, 1978
- Second Wind, by Herb Alpert, 1996
- Second Wind, by Brian Auger's Oblivion Express, 1972

=== Songs ===
- "Second Wind" (song), by Darryl Worley, 2001
- "You're Only Human (Second Wind)", by Billy Joel, 1985
- "Second Wind", by Kelly Clarkson from Piece by Piece, 2015
- "Second Wind", by Little River Band from Get Lucky, 1990
- "Second Wind", by Tracy Bonham from Down Here, 2000

== Other ==
- Second Wind Fund, a youth suicide prevention program in Denver, Colorado, US
- Second Wind Systems Inc., a maker of wind-energy instrumentation, a subsidiary of Vaisala
