= Elita Loresca =

Filipino-American newscaster (born 1977)

- Born: June 28, 1977 (age 49); Manila, Philippines
- Education: Cal State Fullerton; Mississippi State University
- Occupation: Weather presenter
- Years active: 2000–present
- Employer(s): KNBC; 2007–14; KTRK-TV; 2015–present
- Spouse: Ryan Nuveman
- Children: Ryan Nuveman, Jr. Emery Rylee Nuveman

Elita A. Loresca (born June 28, 1977), is a Filipino-American newscaster. She has worked for KGET-TV, the NBC affiliate in Bakersfield, California, WSVN 7 in Miami, Florida, and KNBC in Los Angeles, California. Loresca currently works at KTRK-TV in Houston, Texas.

== Career ==
Loresca began her career as a news associate at KCBS-TV in Los Angeles, where she was responsible for the assembly of scripts and teleprompter operation during the newscasts. From January 2001 to August 2002, she was the noon weather anchor and assignment editor for KGET-TV in Bakersfield, California. In 2002, she moved to KGPE-TV in Fresno, California where she served as the morning and noon weather anchor.

She covered two of the most devastating hurricane seasons in recent history. Starting on her first day at WSVN Miami in 2004, she began forecasting the 2004 hurricane season with Hurricane Frances. In 2005, she contributed reports for her station from the National Hurricane Center during Hurricane Katrina, Hurricane Rita, and Hurricane Wilma.

Loresca is a graduate of the Broadcast Journalism Program at Cal State Fullerton and earned the Certificate of Broadcast Meteorology at Mississippi State University. Born in the Philippines, she moved to Southern California when she was ten months old and grew up in both downtown Los Angeles and Chino. She is a volunteer for Habitat for Humanity and The National Alliance to Nurture the Aged and the Youth (NANAY), a non-profit Filipino organization.

While working at WSVN, Loresca won the title "America's Sexiest Newscaster" in an online vote by readers of FHM magazine. She was featured in the October 2006 issue.

== Personal ==
Loresca graduated in 1995 from Chino High School, in Chino California. She was an avid basketball player throughout her high school career. On September 4, 2010, she married Ryan Nuveman, who is a brother of USA Softball Olympic gold medalist, Stacey Nuveman. Her first child was born in September 2011.
