= KTRK-TV =

Television station in Houston

- Houston, Texas; United States
- Channels: Digital: 13 (VHF); Virtual: 13
- Branding: ABC 13; ABC 13 Eyewitness News

Programming
- Affiliations: 13.1: ABC; for others, see § Technical information and subchannels

Ownership
- Owner: ABC Owned Television Stations; (KTRK Television, Inc.)

History
- First air date: November 20, 1954
- Former channel numbers: Analog: 13 (VHF, 1954–2009); Digital: 32 (UHF, 2000–2009)
- Call sign meaning: Variant derived from former radio partner KTRH

Technical information
- Licensing authority: FCC
- Facility ID: 35675
- ERP: 32.4 kW
- HAAT: 588 m (1,929 ft)
- Transmitter coordinates: 29°34′27″N 95°29′37″W

Links
- Public license information: Public file; LMS
- Website: abc13.com

KTRK-TV (channel 13) is a television station in Houston, Texas, United States. It is owned and operated by the ABC network via its ABC Owned Television Stations division, and maintains studio facilities on Bissonnet Street in Houston's Upper Kirby district. Its transmitter is located near Missouri City, in unincorporated northeastern Fort Bend County.

== History ==
=== Early years ===
After the Federal Communications Commission (FCC) lifted its freeze on new television station applications, multiple groups expressed interest in channel 13, which became the last VHF assignment to be adjudicated in Houston. By June 1953, six different firms had filed, including the Houston Television Company, featuring a number of prominent local businessmen; the Houston Chronicle via the KTRH Broadcasting Company (which had filed in 1948); South Texas Television Company; Houston Area Television Company; W. W. Lechner; and the TV Broadcasting Co. of Houston, owned by Roy Hofheinz. Lechner dropped out, as did South Texas Television, and the four remaining bidders combined their applications in January 1954 into Houston Consolidated Television, in which KTRH and Houston Area Television each owned 32 percent, Houston Television Company owned 20 percent, and Hofheinz owned 16 percent. Houston Consolidated was then granted the construction permit. The combined company, with its 34 stockholders, was hailed by Houston Chronicle president John T. Jones, Jr. as "the greatest civic achievement in Houston in many years".

Construction on the transmitter in Fort Bend County, southwest of Almeda, began in July. For studios, the new KTRK-TV leased the former studios of KNUZ-TV (channel 39), a DuMont affiliate which had gone dark that June, and the call letters KTRK-TV were selected after the FCC denied use of KTRH-TV because the radio station did not have controlling interest in Houston Consolidated Television.

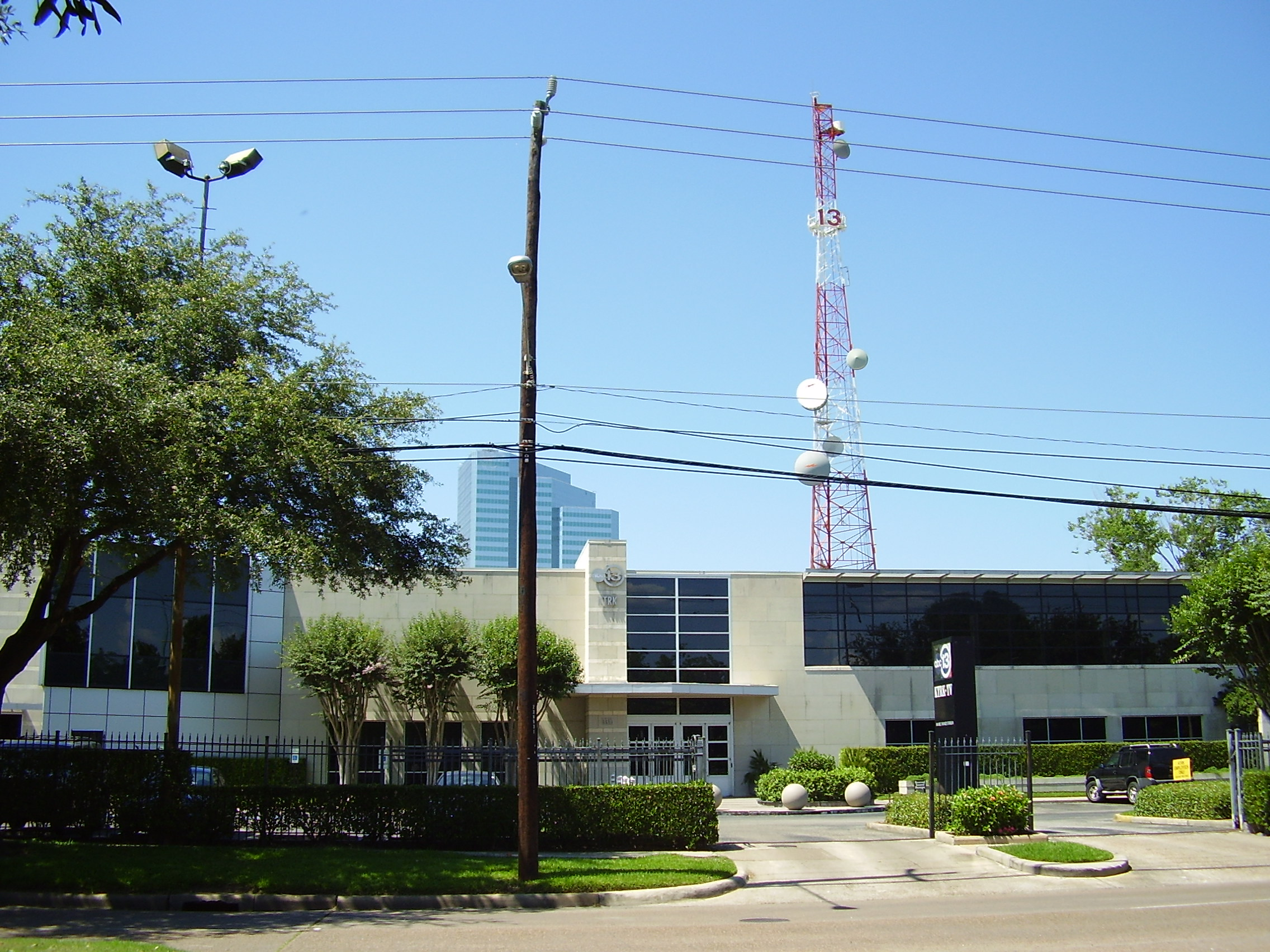
KTRK-TV's studios in the Upper Kirby district.

KTRK-TV began broadcasting November 20, 1954. It was the first full ABC affiliate for Houston. In its early years, it sought to block the move of a third station into Houston proper by opposing efforts by KGUL-TV (channel 11) to move in from Galveston, which were approved by the FCC in 1956. The present Bissonnet Street studios were inaugurated in November 1961; designed by Hermon Lloyd (later architect of the Astrodome), the facility features a dome that enclosed two studios, which was boasted to be the first such round studio building in the United States.

Early local programs included the children's show Kitirik, which featured the station's mascot, a black cat named after the call letters. This was a deliberate play on the station being located on "unlucky" channel 13. The show remained on the air until 1970.

=== Capital Cities ownership ===
In late 1966, Houston Consolidated Television announced it was selling KTRK-TV to the Capital Cities Broadcasting Company. The nearly $21.3 million purchase fell just behind the acquisition of WIIC-TV in Pittsburgh, making it the second-highest price paid at a time for a single TV station. Cap Cities already owned five VHF television stations and had to sell one of them to acquire the Houston outlet, which resulted in the company disposing itself of WPRO-TV in Providence, Rhode Island, in a deal that closed simultaneously with its purchase of KTRK-TV in July 1967.

Capital Cities made major investments in news and other programming, and by 1978, KTRK-TV was rumored to be the most profitable station in the entire company. In February 1985, it captured an unprecedented 47 percent of the network audience in Houston.

=== An ABC-owned station ===
Capital Cities bought ABC in 1985, making KTRK an ABC owned-and-operated station; it was the first television O&O in Houston, but not the first broadcast property in the market for ABC, as they previously owned KXYZ and KXYZ-FM (now KHMX) from 1968 to 1980. Investment continued; the studio facility was expanded in 1993 with a new, 20,000-square-foot (1,900 m^{2}) addition that changed the appearance of the street frontage. Capital Cities/ABC was sold to The Walt Disney Company in early 1996.

== News operation ==
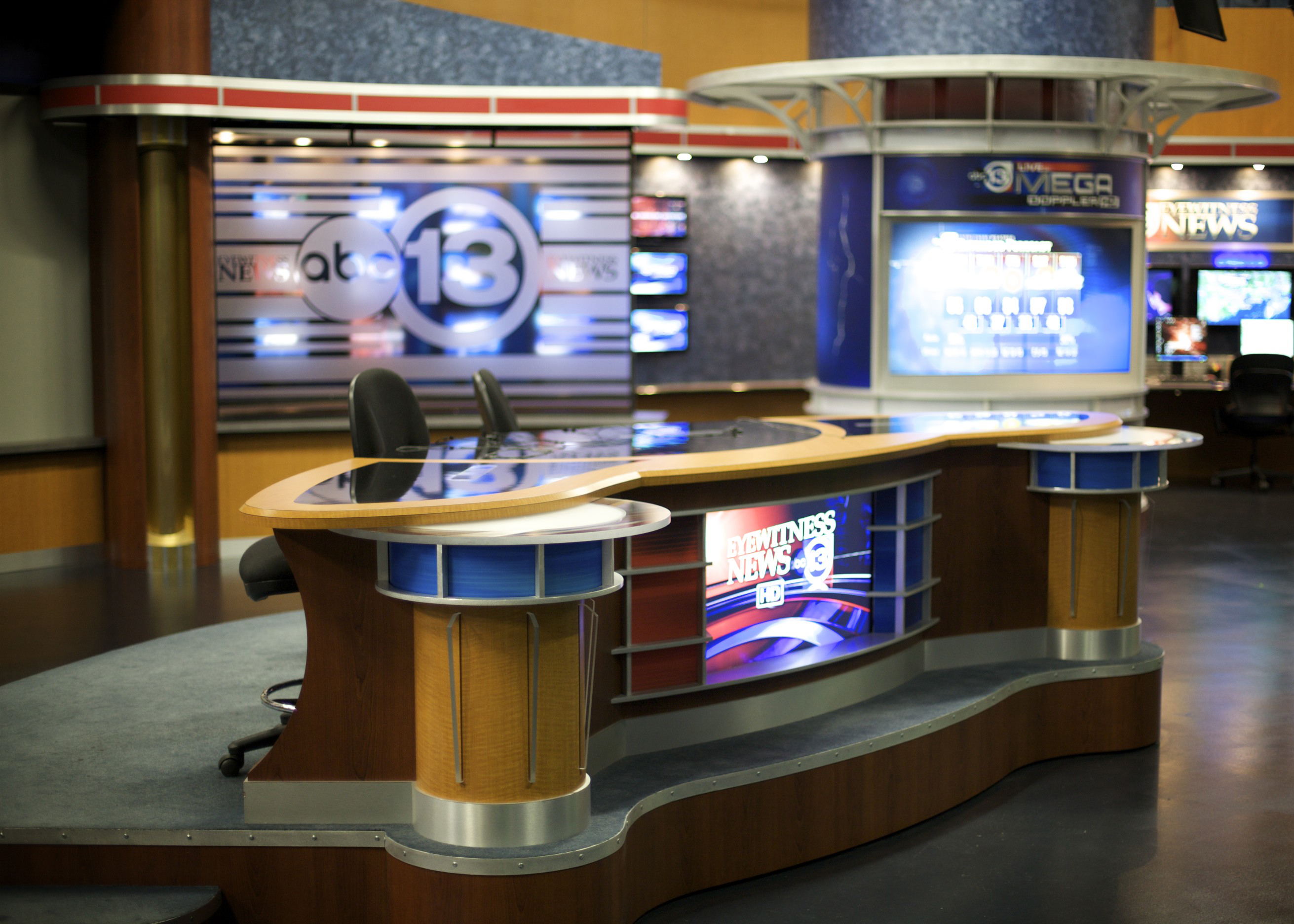
13 Eyewitness News set in December 2009.

Under Capital Cities, KTRK increased its focus on local news programming. After channel 13 expanded its local newscasts to 30 minutes in January 1967, in the final months under Houston Consolidated, in 1969, the station adopted the Eyewitness News name for its newscasts; at the time, it was a distant third place behind KPRC and KHOU. At the same time that the newscasts were expanded in 1967, Dave Ward, who had joined the station a year earlier as a reporter, became anchor of the station's 7 a.m. newscast. He was promoted to anchor the 6 p.m. weeknight newscast a year later, a post he held until his retirement in 2017. His 50-year tenure as channel 13's main anchor is the longest in American television history. In the 1970s, as a result of the investments made by Capital Cities, KTRK became the news leader in the Houston market; by the start of 1973, it was in second place, and it was the news leader in every ratings book from 1973 to 1993.

Channel 13's formula may have worked because of what was happening in Houston during the years of its ascendance. ... As the city grew exponentially and boomed economically, fast-paced newscasts stressing spot news, laced with presentations by distinctive, assertive characters, mirrored the impression many residents had of their town by the end of the day: a hectic, chaotic, goofy place.

— D.J. Wilson, describing the ingredients of KTRK's rise in a 1994 Houston Press article

KTRK also became known for its legendary consumer and investigative reporter, Marvin Zindler, whose week-long reports on a La Grange brothel in 1973 led to the closing of the Chicken Ranch, a bordello that was later immortalized in the musical and film, The Best Little Whorehouse in Texas and ZZ Top's hit song "La Grange". Zindler, who joined KTRK in 1973 at Ward's suggestion after being pushed out of the Harris County sheriff's office, and whose arrival was noted as marking the start of a two-decade "broadcast dynasty" for the station, was also widely noted in the Houston market for his Friday night Rat and Roach Report focusing on Houston restaurants that have failed health inspections, which ended with his trademark line "Slime in the Ice Machine". After becoming the first Houston TV personality to sign a contract paying him more than $1 million in 1984, Zindler signed a lifetime contract with KTRK in 1988, making him the first person offered such a contract by Capital Cities, which had a reputation for being a financially frugal company. Zindler continued to work for the station until his death from pancreatic cancer in 2007, even filing reports from his hospital bed during treatment.

Another long-running program was in the mornings. Good Morning Houston, which had evolved from a local Dialing for Dollars program, remained on the air at 9 a.m. from 1967 until it was axed in 1993 to improve KTRK's morning ratings and make more room for syndicated talk shows.

During the 1970s and 1980s, Ward and co-anchor Jan Carson, along with Zindler, sports director Bob Allen and weatherman Ed Brandon, led KTRK to the No. 1 position at 6 and 10 p.m. In mid-April 1977 the station also debuted its 5 p.m. newscast, Live at Five, which also grew to become the top-rated program in its timeslot, and saw its 6 p.m. newscast expand to a full hour by September 1982, replacing the syndicated version of Family Feud which had moved to KPRC-TV. Later in the 1980s, Ward was joined on the anchor desk by Live at Five anchor Shara Fryer (Carson left KTRK in 1979 for ABC O&O KGO-TV in San Francisco before returning to Houston to anchor at KPRC-TV in 1983). While the newscasts (and ABC's prime time lineup) came to dominate the Houston ratings during the 1980s well into the 1990s, KTRK also had to face spirited competition from KPRC-TV, which became one of the most respected NBC affiliates in the country during the 1980s as NBC came to lead the national prime time ratings, as well as a resurgent KHOU by the dawn of the 1990s and new competition from charter Fox owned-and-operated station KRIV and independent stations KHTV on channel 39 (now CW owned-and-operated station KIAH) and then-24-hour "all news" channel KNWS-TV on channel 51 (now MeTV owned-and-operated station KYAZ) during this period, even though the latter two eventually shut down their news operations later in the 1990s due to poor ratings.

On October 7, 2002, new chief meteorologist Tim Heller (who joined from Fox O&O KDFW in Dallas) would succeed Brandon as the station's lead weatherman, presiding over the station's 10 p.m. and Live at Five weather reports while Brandon would continue to preside over the station's 6 p.m. weather reports until his retirement in 2007 after a 35-year career (with occasional appearances as a fill-in weather anchor afterwards), while Fryer would be succeeded by former MSNBC anchor (and former KTRK morning anchor) Gina Gaston the prior year, with Gaston settling into the position during KTRK's wall-to-wall coverage of Tropical Storm Allison. On August 13, 2007, KTRK became the second television station in the Houston market to begin broadcasting portions of its local newscasts in high definition, becoming the seventh ABC-owned station to make the transition.

In January 2013, sports director Bob Allen left KTRK after a 38-year career with the station, having been succeeded by Greg Bailey (who held the same position at WCNC-TV in Charlotte) four months prior on September 4, 2012. (Allen would later join KHOU as their lead sports anchor, remaining in that position until his death in 2016.) On January 11, 2019, chief meteorologist Tim Heller retired from KTRK after a 17-year career, and was replaced by current chief meteorologist Travis Herzog on the following Monday, January 14.

In recent years, KTRK has expanded its news offerings to include a 4 p.m. newscast that launched in the late summer of 2001. On August 17, 2009, KTRK became the first station in the market to expand its weekday morning newscast to 4:30 a.m., with all of KTRK's competitors following suit later in the year. On August 26, 2013, KTRK-TV split its hourlong 6 p.m. newscast into two separate half hours, with the 6 p.m. half-hour continuing with Dave Ward and Gina Gaston, while Erik Barajas and Ilona Carson would take over as anchors of the newly rechristened 6:30 p.m. newscast; following Ward's retirement in 2017, Live at Five anchor Art Rascon would take Ward's place at 6 p.m., with the station expanding its 10 p.m. newscast to one hour on weekends beginning January 4, 2014. On September 10, 2018, KTRK became the first television station in Texas to air a 3 p.m. newscast.

KTRK's Eyewitness News logo.

In August 2019, news director Wendy Granato was promoted to general manager for the station. She was the first woman to lead the newsroom and became the first woman to take the reins of the entire station.

Through an agreement with Nexstar Media Group, KTRK produced an hour-long 9 p.m. newscast for Nexstar-owned CW outlet KIAH from May 11, 2020, to August 28, 2026. The following day, KHOU took over production of the 9 p.m. newscast on KIAH; KTRK continues to air its 9 p.m. newscast on its streaming platforms.

=== Sports coverage ===
KTRK has been the official television home of the Houston Texans since the team began play in 2002, telecasting any preseason games that are not aired nationally. The station also airs three Texans programs that, like the games, are aired by a network of stations covering most of Texas:

- Texans Extra Points, a game preview show aired on Saturdays at 10:30 p.m. during the season;
- Texans 360, a weekly recap of highlights and news coverage of the Texans, aired on Saturdays at 11 p.m. throughout the year;
- Houston Texans Inside the Game, a game recap hosted by KTRK sports director Greg Bailey and Spencer Tillman) on Sundays at 10:35 p.m.

KTRK also serves as the official local television home of the Houston Marathon.

=== Notable on-air staff ===
==== Current staff ====
- Gina Gaston – anchor
- Elita Loresca – meteorologist

==== Former staff ====
- Troy Dungan – meteorologist (1964–1976)
- Van Hackett – reporter/anchor (1980–1987)
- Art Rascon – anchor (1998–2022)
- Jacob Rascon – anchor/reporter (2022–2024)
- Dan Rather – sportscaster (late 1950s)
- Steven Romo – anchor (2016–2021)
- Jim Rosenfield – reporter/anchor (1983–1989)
- Dave Ward – anchor/reporter (1966–2017)
- Marvin Zindler – Action 13 consumer reporter (1973–2007)

== Technical information and subchannels ==
KTRK-TV's transmitter is located near Missouri City, in unincorporated northeastern Fort Bend County. The station's signal is multiplexed:

Subchannels of KTRK-TV
Subchannel	Res.	Short name	Programming
13.1	720p	KTRK-HD	ABC
13.2	720p	LOCLish	Localish
13.3	480i	Charge!	Charge!
13.4	480i	QVC	QVC
20.4	480i	Buzzer	Buzzr (KTXH)

Broadcast on behalf of another station

=== Analog-to-digital conversion ===
KTRK-TV ended regular programming on its analog signal, over VHF channel 13, on June 12, 2009, as part of the federally mandated transition from analog to digital television. As most of ABC's owned-and-operated stations moved their digital channels to their former analog allocation for post-transition operations, the station's digital signal relocated from its pre-transition UHF channel 32 to VHF channel 13. KPXB-TV currently operates its digital signal on KTRK's pre-transition channel position.

The station's two digital subchannels, which originally featured additional news coverage and features programming on 13.2 and The Local AccuWeather Channel on 13.3, would eventually take on their current subchannel affiliations upon their respective launches (2009 in the case of Live Well Network; 2015 in the case of Laff). In 2015, Live Well no longer produced original programming and was moribund. On February 17, 2020, the ABC Owned Television Stations division launched the rebranded Localish subchannel.
