= Marvin Zindler =

American journalist

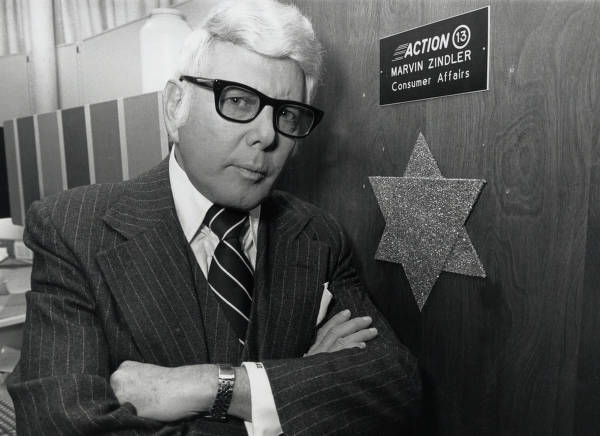
- Born: Marvin Harold Zindler; August 10, 1921; Houston, Texas
- Died: July 29, 2007 (aged 85); Houston, Texas
- Resting place: Woodlawn Cemetery; Houston, Texas
- Occupation: Television journalist
- Spouses: Gertrude Zindler, Niki Zindler
- Children: 4 sons, 1 daughter

Marvin Harold Zindler (August 10, 1921 – July 29, 2007) was a news reporter for television station KTRK-TV in Houston, Texas, United States. His investigative journalism, through which he mostly represented the city's elderly and working class, made him one of the city's most influential and well-known media personalities.

== Early life ==
Zindler attended Pershing Middle School and Lamar High School in Houston before graduating from San Jacinto High School in Houston. He went on to John Tarleton Agricultural College (now Tarleton State University) in Stephenville, Texas. In 1941, when the United States entered World War II, Zindler joined the United States Marine Corps and later received an honorable discharge for medical reasons.

Zindler's father, Abe Zindler, who founded and owned a successful clothing store in Houston, was disappointed in Marvin, whom Abe considered frivolous and irresponsible. Abe wanted his sons to inherit the store, a career course that Marvin was reluctant to take because of his father's sometimes angry behavior. When Abe died in 1963, Marvin's inheritance was instead allocated to a trust for Zindler's children.

== Early career ==
Zindler began his broadcasting career in 1943 as a part-time night radio disc jockey and spot news reporter at Houston radio station KATL (the current-day KMIC (1590)) while working for his family's clothing store. Beginning in 1951, when he worked for KATL, he hosted The Roving Mike, a 30-minute radio program airing on Sundays that documented crime and the people involved in Houston. In 1950 Zindler became a reporter and cameraman for Southwest Film Production Company which produced the 6 p.m. news for KPRC-TV, but in 1954, he was fired by an executive who said he was "too ugly" to work in TV. Two years later, Zindler joined the Scripps Howard Houston Press to work part-time as a crime reporter and photographer. While working for the newspaper and his father's store, Zindler became dissatisfied with the retail business and in 1962 took a career detour to join the Harris County Sheriff's Office. He handled Civil Process for two years and then joined the Fugitive Squad where his work took him all over the world to extradite fugitives.

Two years before joining KTRK-TV, Zindler was assigned by the Sheriff and District Attorney to establish a Consumer Fraud Division with the Harris County District Attorney's Office. This division is still in operation today. It was during this time of his career that he got his first taste of working on behalf of people. After Jack Heard was elected Sheriff of Harris County in 1972, Zindler was unceremoniously let go, a move that Zindler blamed on agitated car dealers who were alleged to have been rolling back odometers.

== At KTRK-TV ==
Upon news of Zindler's departure from the Harris County Sheriff's Department, KTRK anchor Dave Ward recommended Zindler to the station's assistant news director. On January 1, 1973, Marvin Zindler joined KTRK, a station with a news program languishing in third place.

=== The "Chicken Ranch" story ===
Zindler made local and national headlines when he and fellow journalist Larry Conners reported on a long-lived brothel known as the Chicken Ranch in Fayette County, Texas, near La Grange, which led to its closure in 1973. The Chicken Ranch story was featured in a 1973 edition of Texas Monthly magazine, two 1974 issues of Playboy magazine, was the basis for the Broadway and film musical The Best Little Whorehouse in Texas, in which the character of Melvin P. Thorpe was based on Zindler. It also served as the basis of the song "La Grange" by ZZ Top. The closing did not go well with the sheriff of Fayette County, Jim T. Flournoy, who later attacked Zindler in a fight that left Zindler with two fractured ribs, along with a snatched toupee. Reportedly, Flournoy waved the hairpiece in the air as if it were a prized enemy scalp and threw it in the street.

Governor Dolph Briscoe closed the operation, only to have it open again after a few months. Then Zindler stepped in to shed more light on the operation, which led to its being closed for good.

=== Lifetime contract ===
The story, along with his trademark reporting style, was instrumental in Zindler signing an unprecedented lifetime contract with Capital Cities/ABC, Inc. and KTRK-TV in September 1988, which he honored. The last story filed was to help an American citizen obtain a Social Security card. Zindler had been a primary factor in KTRK's rise from a perennial third in the ratings to its usual number one position.

=== "Rat and Roach Report" ===
Zindler was also famed in Houston for his self-described Rat and Roach Report, where he read details from his controversial City of Houston Food Inspection Program restaurant reports on the air. These reports soon became famous for Zindler's enthusiastic reports of "sliiiiime in the ice machine!", which quickly became a catchphrase of his, and eventually given their own subsection at the end of the reports. Hundreds, if not thousands, of restaurants in Greater Houston have made at least one appearance on his reports. KTRK-TV's own commissary was cited on one occasion.

Zindler's Rat and Roach Reports were traditionally broadcast on Friday nights live during KTRK's 6 p.m. newscast and rebroadcast later during the station's 10 p.m. newscast.

Two spin-off segments resulted from these reports:

- In the first spin-off, Marvin Zindler also rewarded restaurants for operating clean kitchens continuously with his "Blue Ribbon Awards," which was done in his final years with local beauty pageant contestants giving the envelopes of the winning restaurants to Zindler.
- The other spin-off showcased places where Zindler preferred to dine, called "Where Marvin Likes to Eat...". Most of these restaurants were locally based restaurants, while a handful of them were national chains, including McDonald's and Ruth's Chris Steak House. But Zindler's favorite place to eat, which was seen in the last segment of this spin-off feature, was his home.

On Friday nights, Zindler also gave viewers additional good wishes just before his traditional sign-off: "Have a good weekend – good golf, good tennis, or whatever makes you happy."

=== Other stories ===
Zindler's reports on KTRK also included international stories, many involving trips to various third-world countries; segments in which local business owners (known as Marvin's Angels) provided services to people in dire financial or physical health; and stories focused on the elderly, including nursing home abuse investigations. On his Friday reports, Zindler had also reported birthday and wedding anniversary greetings on air, usually involving those celebrating their 100th birthday or at least a 50th wedding anniversary. The station has stated that over 100,000 requests for help from Zindler were received yearly. In choosing stories, Zindler focused on two factors – neediness and chance of success. While low income was a key factor, being selected for a story had more to do with an injustice than with income.

Marvin Zindler's trademark signoff at the end of each report was, nearly shouting: "Marvin Zindler... Eyewitness News."

== Honors ==
Zindler was the recipient of hundreds of awards from news organizations, charity groups, and medical professionals. The Plastic Surgeons of America honored Zindler for his openness and honesty in talking about his cosmetic surgeries and for the help he obtained for charity patients who desperately needed reconstructive surgery. He was a Freemason, a member of Temple Lodge #4 in Houston and was particularly proud of the 33rd Degree that was conferred upon him by the Scottish Rite.

== Personal life ==
Zindler was Jewish. In 1941, he married his first wife, the former Gertrude S. Kugler (May 30, 1921 – November 28, 1997). They had five children together; Marvin Jr., Donny, Danny, Mark and Helen. When Gertrude died, Zindler vowed he would never marry again, yet he fell in love with Niki Devine and married her in 2006. Before his death, Marvin and Niki Zindler lived in the Houston neighborhood of Maplewood, where Zindler had lived continuously for forty-eight years. They were the owners of a dog, Magic, a Bichon Frisé. Additionally, Zindler owned a cat, Sugar, who died in 2006. At the time of his death, Zindler had five children, nine grandchildren, and one great-grandchild.

At one point in the 1970s, Zindler considered running for Congress as a Republican, and the local GOP commissioned surveys that predicted he would win. However, Gertrude was hesitant to leave Houston, and the plans were dropped. Also, Zindler described himself as a social liberal who supported universal health care and the feminist movement. He had initially been a Democrat and a Lyndon B. Johnson supporter. Zindler's father was a four-term mayor of suburban Bellaire and was also a liberal; he was a card-carrying member of the NAACP and opponent of the Ku Klux Klan and his clothing store was among a handful of Houston businesses that advertised in African-American newspapers.

Zindler was known for wearing makeup continually, loved cigars, and was a frequent golfer. He had his own producer and cameraman as well as his own editing suite at KTRK. Zindler was also noted for his seventeen cosmetic surgeries, the first of which took place in 1954 after the KPRC-TV firing. KTRK's longtime investigative reporter, Wayne Dolcefino, has described Zindler's eccentric behavior in the office, including loud phone conversations (which Dolcefino attributed to his poor hearing) and trademark zealous pursuit of reports.

On November 10, 1999, Zindler appeared on KTRK's locally produced mid-morning talk show at the time, Debra Duncan as the show paid tribute to him as well as talking about his life and legacy.

=== Illness and death ===
On July 5, 2007, it was announced on KTRK's 6:00 p.m. newscast that Zindler was diagnosed with inoperable pancreatic cancer that had also spread to his liver. In a news conference, Zindler said he would continue to work. Zindler stated that he planned to stay on the air as his illness was treated, even doing restaurant reports and greetings from his bedside. Zindler died from the cancer at The University of Texas M. D. Anderson Cancer Center in the Texas Medical Center in Houston on July 29, 2007, two nights after what would turn out to be his final newscast.

Zindler's funeral took place on Wednesday, August 1, 2007 at Congregation Beth Israel of Houston. ABC-13 staff members and Houston-area religious figures, such as Joel Osteen, Archbishop Joseph Fiorenza, Reverend Bill Lawson (anchor Melanie Lawson's father), and Reverend Kirbyjon Caldwell were among those presenting tributes to Zindler at the funeral. He was interred at Woodlawn Cemetery, Houston, Texas.

== Legacy ==
The role of Melvin P. Thorpe, as played by Clinton Allmon in the original Broadway production of The Best Little Whorehouse in Texas and Dom DeLuise in the 1982 film version, is based on Zindler.

In November 2007, Bellaire Park in Bellaire, Texas was renamed "Bellaire Zindler Park."

== See also ==
- History of the Jews in Houston
