= Jacob Rascon =

American journalist

Jacob Rascon is an American journalist and morning news anchor for CBS affiliate KHOU in Houston. He also worked as a news anchor and journalist at Houston news stations KTRK-TV and NBC affiliate KPRC-TV. Rascon is the son of former news anchor Art Rascon who worked for KTRK-TV from 1998 to 2022. The pair co-anchored a newscast together before Art retired and Jacob began working on air full time the following day.

Rascon previously worked as a Los Angeles and Dallas-based correspondent for NBC News and before that, a reporter for KNBC in Los Angeles and at Fox affiliate KFOX-TV in El Paso. Rascon is a member of the Church of Jesus Christ of Latter-day Saints, and he served an LDS Mission in Uruguay after finishing high school. Rascon attended Brigham Young University and Brigham Young University–Idaho. His uncle, Dan Rascon, and his younger brother, Matt Rascon, are also news broadcasters: the former is currently in Salt Lake City at NBC affiliate KSL-TV and the latter was recently at Cleveland NBC affiliate WKYC.

Jacob Rascon, along with his brother Matt, also serve respectively as consultant and president with Rascon Media Group. The group, which was founded by Art Rascon, specializes in media training, storytelling, and communication.
