= Dennis Murphy (journalist) =

American journalist

- Education: Williams College
- Occupation: NBC News Correspondent

Dennis Murphy is an American television journalist and winner of four national Emmy Awards for excellence in news reporting, known for regular contributions to Dateline NBC, NBC Nightly News, The Today Show and NBC News at Sunrise.

Murphy began his career as an NBC News correspondent in 1982 at the Burbank, California bureau. In 1988 he covered the Democratic presidential primaries and was NBC's traveling correspondent on the Bush campaign.

Since May 1994, Murphy has been a correspondent with Dateline NBC. He won an Emmy for a report on revolution in Romania in 1989.
