= Gina Gaston =

American journalist

Gina Gaston (born January 14, 1966, in Oxnard, CA) is a television journalist and currently the lead anchor for KTRK-TV in Houston, Texas.

== Career ==
She joined channel 13 in 1992 to anchor the morning newscast with Tom Koch. She then left in 1999 to co-anchor HomePage, an afternoon show on MSNBC, with Ashleigh Banfield and Mika Brzezinski. Entertainment Weekly described the trio as "the Powerpuff Girls of journalism". Gaston left MSNBC in 2000. In 2001, she returned to channel 13 to anchor and report the 6 and 10pm newscast, replacing long-time anchor Shara Fryer. Prior to joining KTRK-TV, she worked at WTSP in Tampa, Florida, WHTM-TV in Harrisburg, Pennsylvania, and KLTV in Tyler, Texas.

== Awards and honors ==
Gaston won a 2007 Lone Star Emmy Award for Outstanding Achievement for a documentary. She won a 2007 National Headliner Award as well for a documentary titled Soulful Stitches. She has also won several Associated Press awards. Gaston is a 1987 graduate of the University of Southern California.

== Personal life ==
Gaston is married to former Houston Rockets player Mario Elie. In 2003, Gina gave birth to triplets—two boys and one girl.
