= Avenida Houston =

Neighborhood in Houston, Texas

Coordinates: 29.7524°N 95.3586°W

Avenida Houston (ah-veh-NEE-duh) is the name of the neighborhood generally surrounding the George R. Brown Convention Center in Houston, Texas. It is the finished product of the initial phase of Houston First Corporation’s 2025 GRB Master Plan for redeveloping the eastern edge of downtown.

Houston First is a local government corporation that operates Houston’s convention and performing arts facilities. A local government corporation formed in 2011, Houston First manages more than 10 city-owned buildings and properties and underground and surface parking for nearly 7,000 vehicles. In addition to the George R. Brown, other prominent facilities under HFC management include the Hilton Americas-Houston Hotel, Jones Hall for the Performing Arts, Wortham Theater Center an Miller Outdoor Theatre.

Central to the Avenida Houston campus is the newly designed Avenida Plaza in front of the George R. Brown that favors pedestrians over vehicle traffic and allows visitors easy access to Discovery Green Park and two convention headquarter-size hotels, the Hilton Americas-Houston (1,200 rooms) and the new Marriott Marquis (1,000 rooms).

A wave of diverse restaurants is being developed in the area, including Grotto Downtown, Bud's Pitmaster BBQ, McAlister's Deli, Pappadeaux Seafood Kitchen and Kulture.

In addition, Avenida Houston features unique art installations and programmed events. The most prominent works are Ed Wilson's Soaring in the Clouds and Joe O'Connell and Creative Machine's Wings Over Water.

At the north end of Avenida Houston is Partnership Tower, a 10-story office building that opened on September 12, 2016. HFC maintains its corporate offices in Partnership Tower. Other organizations with employees in the building are Greater Houston Partnership, Harris County-Houston Sports Authority and the Hotel Lodging Association of Greater Houston.

Nearby, sporting and concert venues Daikin Park, Toyota Center and Shell Energy Stadium are additional attractions for those visiting Avenida Houston.
