= Second Wind Fund =

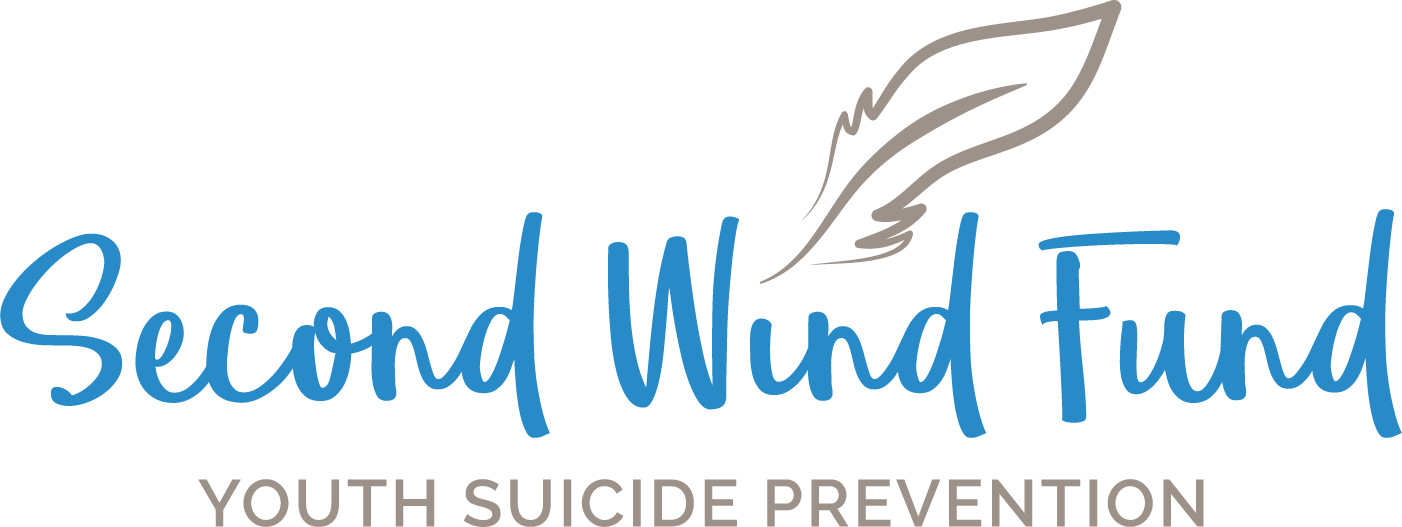
Logo

The Second Wind Fund is a youth suicide prevention program in Colorado with a headquarters located in Denver.

Second Wind Fund provides access to mental health support for people under 20 who are possibly suicidal. Over 7,000 youth have been referred from approximately 400 schools and other agencies and organizations throughout 30 different counties in Colorado.

While other suicide prevention organizations offer broad suicide prevention education and awareness, Second Wind Fund offers actual treatment services to at-risk children and youth. Second Wind Fund has built an innovative program to match children and youth ages 19 and younger, who are at risk of suicide, with a licensed therapist in their local community.

Referrals are typically made by school mental health staff (School Counselors, Social Workers or Psychologists) and sometimes by other mental health professionals. Home schooled youth or those no longer attending school are also eligible. If the referred youth is at risk for suicide and does not have adequate insurance or the means to pay for the necessary mental health treatment, the cost of therapy for up to 12 individual sessions is paid for by Second Wind Fund.

Second Wind Fund believes that all communities and people are affected by suicide and that open, honest communication about the pervasiveness of suicide is critical to reducing its incidence.

== See also ==
- American Foundation for Suicide Prevention
- National Suicide Prevention Lifeline
- Suicide Prevention Action Network USA
